= Șoimuș (disambiguation) =

Șoimuș may refer to several places in Romania:

- Șoimuș, a commune in Hunedoara County
- Șoimuș, a village in Rădeşti Commune, Alba County
- Șoimuș, a village administered by Lipova town, Arad County
- Șoimuș, a village in Remetea Commune, Bihor County
- Șoimuș, a village in Șieu Commune, Bistriţa-Năsăud County
- Șoimuș, a village in Coroisânmărtin Commune, Mureș County
- Șoimuș, a village in Someș-Odorhei Commune, Sălaj County
- Buceava-Șoimuș, a village in Brazii Commune, Arad County
- Șoimușu Mare and Șoimușu Mic, villages in Săcel Commune, Harghita County
- Șoimușeni, a village in Letca Commune, Sălaj County
- Șoimuș (Someș), a tributary of the Someș in Sălaj County
- Șoimuș (Crișul Negru), a tributary of the Valea Roșie in Bihor County
- Șoimuș, a tributary of the Sighișoara in Arad County
- Șoimuș, a tributary of the Dunărița in Alba County

== See also ==
- Șoimeni (disambiguation)
- Șoimu (disambiguation)
