= Poclușa =

Poclușa may refer to several places in Bihor County, Romania:

- Poclușa de Barcău, a village in Chișlaz Commune
- Poclușa de Beiuș, a village in Șoimi Commune
- Poclușa (river), a tributary of the Crișul Negru
