= Șoimu =

Șoimu or Șoimul may refer to the following places in Romania:

- Șoimu, a village in the commune Smârdioasa in Teleorman County
- Șoimul, a tributary of the Cracăul Negru in Neamț County
- Șoimul (Crișul Negru), a tributary of the Poclușa in Bihor County
- Șoimul (Iara), a tributary of the Iara in Cluj County
- Șoimul (Putna), a tributary of the Putna in Vrancea County

== See also ==
- Șoimuș (disambiguation)
