= Géza Szávai =

Hungarian novelist

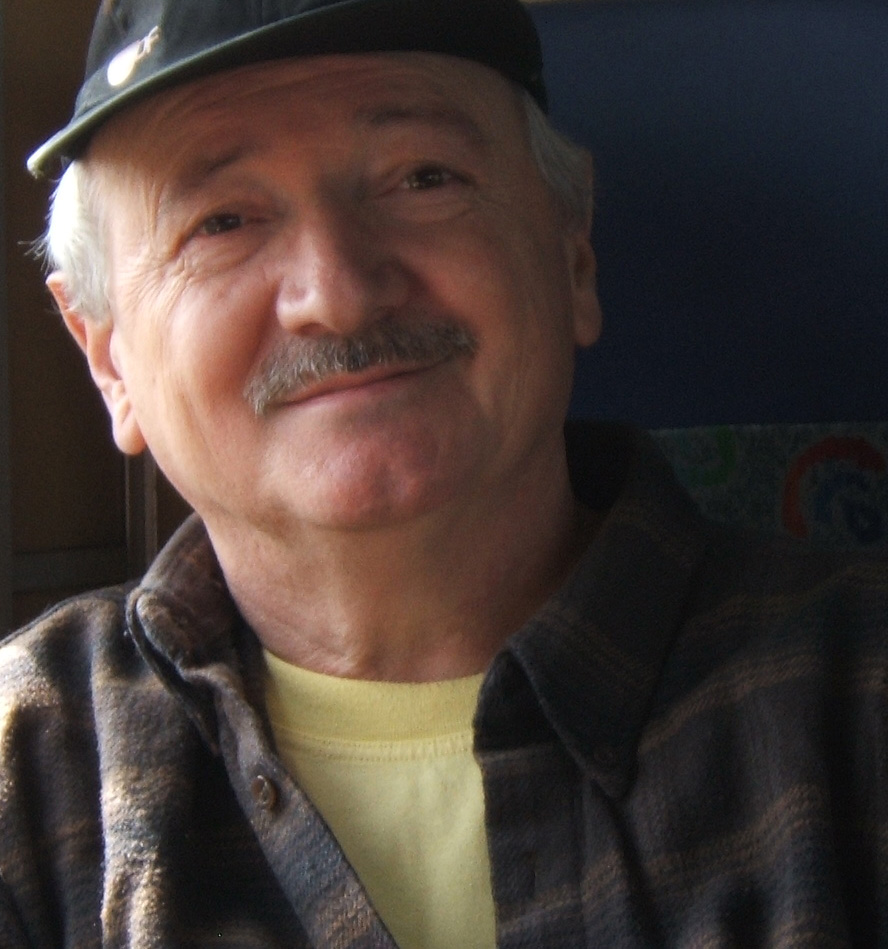
Géza Szávai

Géza Szávai (born 4 December 1950) is a Hungarian novelist.

== Life ==
Szávai was born in 1950 in Szeklerland. (Szeklerland is inhabited by Hungarians and is a specific, autonomous part of the Transylvania, cradle of the history and culture of several nations – Romanians, Germans etc. –, now belonging to Romania.) Having taken a university degree, he taught for a short period of time, then worked as a journalist and editor. He has been living in Budapest since 1988. In 1994 he founded the PONT Publishing House, which publishes books (and periodicals) in several languages. He started an international program called CONFLUX (the opposite of conflict) together with his friends living in Europe and overseas. He writes prose and essays. His most known book, the Szekler Jerusalem is an exciting “essay-novel” containing historical documents, reflections, memoirs and personal confessions, presenting the tragic story of Hungarian Sabbatarians or “spiritual Jews”.

Variety and experiment characterize his work as a novelist. The Past Millenium in Marienbad, a novel described as “monumental” by critics, discusses the personal and collective crises experienced in post-communist Hungary. His novel entitled Aletta’s Ark takes place in 17th century Japan and describes the massacre of Christians that occurred at this time.

Thoroughly enthralled by diversity’s possibilities, Szávai professes that each of his novels comprises a different genre. He believes a few pages can sufficiently convey the depth of an entire novel. In his series, Great Novels and Smaller Ones, he experiments with this unique technique to writing novels. The first volume in this series, Tracks in the Snow, was published in 2008. In an interview about his latest work, Carrying You to Lands of Wonder (2013), Szávai stated that, “It’s fashionable these days to refer to the phrase, ’world music.’ In my opinion, world novels are emerging from the same kinds of depths.” This work also brings world novels to the surface. As far as the author’s interpretation of “wonder” is concerned, he says the following:

There’s naturally a good deal of self-irony and a shade of bitterness in my usage of this word—but I still use it with passionate seriousness…

== Works ==
=== Novels ===
- Séta gramofonzenére (Walking With the Music of a Gramophone; first edition: 1985, published also in German, Romanian and Russian, in preparation in Polish, Spanish and Czech)
- Oszlik a bál (The Ball is Breaking Up; written in 1986, first edition: 1990, published also in Romanian, in preparation in German and Russian)
- Utóvéd (Arriere-gard, first edition: 1987, in preparation in English)
- Ki látott minket meztelenül? (Who Saw Us Naked? first edition: 1998, in preparation in French)
- Székely Jeruzsálem (Szekler Jerusalem; first edition: 2000, fourth Hungarian edition: 2011, published also in French and Romanian)
- Aletta bárkája (Aletta’s Ark, first edition: 2006)
- Múlt évezred Marienbadban (Last Millennium in Marienbad, first edition: 2009)
- Valaki átment a havon – Kisregények és nagyregények (Somebody pass into snow – Great Novels and Novelettes; first edition: 2008)
- Csodálatos országokba hoztalak (Brought You in Wonderful Countries, first edition: 2013)

=== Collections of short stories ===
- Progéria (1982)
- Kivégzősdi (Playing Execution, 1994)

=== Major collections of essays ===
- Helyzettudat és irodalom (Awareness of State and Literature; first edition: 1980);
- Lánc, lánc, Eszterlánc – Vázlat a gyermek világáról (Outline of the Child’s World; first edition: 1983, second, enlarged edition in three volumes:

A hazugság forradalma – A kisgyermek és a valóság: Revolution of Lies – The Child and Reality (Lánc, lánc, Eszterlánc I., 1997); Kétszemélyes költészet – A nyelv és a vers születése (Twohanded Poetry – The Birth of Language and Poetry (Lánc, lánc, Eszterlánc II., 1998); The third volume is in preparation: Láss csodát – A rajzoló kisgyermek lélektana (The Psychology of the Drawing Child).

=== Collections of tales ===
- A Zöld Sivatag vőlegénye (The Groom of the Green Desert; first edition: 1981, second, revised edition: 1994);
- Szávai is writing a seven-volume series of detective stories for children: Burgum Bélus, a mesterdetektív (Burgum Bélus, the Superdetective). Four volumes have been published up to now:

1. Burgum Bélus, a mesterdetektív (Burgum Bélus, the Superdetective), 2. Égi elefántok, avagy B.B. nyomozásai a világűrben (Elephants in the Sky or B.B’s Investigations in Space), 3. A rettenthetetlen vizimedve, avagy B.B. nyomozásai az óceánban (The Fearless Water Bear or B.B’s Investigations in the Ocean), 4. Burgum Bélus az Ezeregyéjben (Burgum Bélus in the 1001 Nights) Foreign language editions of the Burgum Bélus series is also in progress.
