= Újlak =

- Săcel, Harghita, Hungarian name of a village in Romania
- Újlak (Budapest), a part of Budapest, Hungary, now divided between districts II. and III. of the city
- Ilok, Hungarian name of a town in Croatia
- Újlaki family, medieval nobility from the Kingdom of Hungary
- Csák (genus)#Újlak branch, medieval nobility from the Kingdom of Hungary
