= Marasca (disambiguation) =

The marasca is a type of cherry native to Croatia. It may also refer to:

- Enrica Marasca (born 1983), Italian rower
- Mărasca River
- Măreasca River, also known as the Măraşca River
