= Șoimeni =

Șoimeni may refer to several places in Romania:

- Șoimeni, a village in Vultureni Commune, Cluj County
- Șoimeni, a village in Păuleni-Ciuc Commune, Harghita County
- Șoimeni (river), a tributary of the Borșa in Cluj County

== See also ==
- Șoimuș (disambiguation)
