= Honțiș =

- Location within Romania

Location
- Country: Romania
- Counties: Arad County

Physical characteristics
- Mouth: Sighișoara
  - coordinates: 46.2550°N 22.3360°E
- Length: 14 km (8.7 mi)
- Basin size: 28 km^{2} (11 sq mi)

Basin features
- Progression: Sighișoara→ Crișul Alb→ Körös→ Tisza→ Danube→ Black Sea

The Honțiș is a right tributary of the river Sighișoara in Romania. It flows into the Sighișoara in Honțișor. Its length is 14 km (8.7 mi) and its basin size is 28 km^{2} (11 sq mi).
