= Șoimul (Crișul Negru) =

- Location within Romania

Location
- Country: Romania
- Counties: Bihor County
- Villages: Șoimi

Physical characteristics
- Source: Codru-Moma Mountains
- Mouth: Poclușa
  - location: Șoimi
  - coordinates: 46.6849°N 22.1072°E

Basin features
- Progression: Poclușa→ Crișul Negru→ Körös→ Tisza→ Danube→ Black Sea
- Tributaries
  - right: Zărzag

The Șoimul is a right tributary of the Poclușa in Romania. It flows into the Poclușa near Șoimi. Its length is 13 km (8.1 mi) and its basin size is 37 km^{2} (14 sq mi).
