= Măreasca =

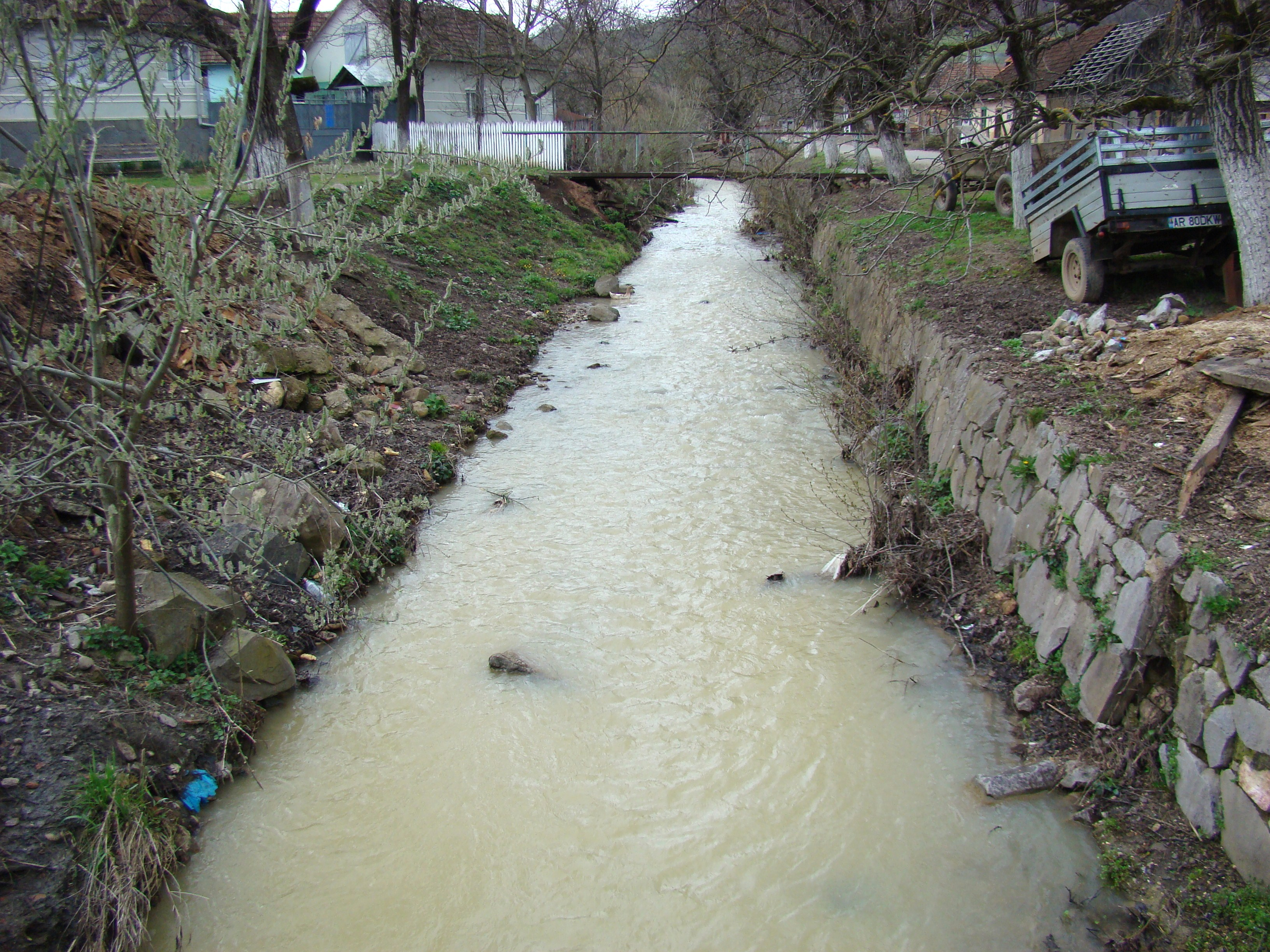
- The Măreasca in Secaș

- Location within Romania

Location
- Country: Romania
- Counties: Arad County
- Villages: Secaș

Physical characteristics
- Mouth: Sighișoara
  - location: Brazii
  - coordinates: 46.2398°N 22.3308°E
- Length: 11 km (6.8 mi)
- Basin size: 25 km^{2} (9.7 sq mi)

Basin features
- Progression: Sighișoara→ Crișul Alb→ Körös→ Tisza→ Danube→ Black Sea

The Măreasca is a left tributary of the river Sighișoara in Romania. It flows into the Sighișoara in Brazii. Its length is 11 km (6.8 mi) and its basin size is 25 km^{2} (9.7 sq mi).
