= Poclușa (river) =

- Location within Romania

Location
- Country: Romania
- Counties: Bihor County
- Villages: Ursad

Physical characteristics
- Mouth: Crișul Negru
  - coordinates: 46.6893°N 22.1098°E
- Length: 7 km (4.3 mi)
- Basin size: 48 km^{2} (19 sq mi)

Basin features
- Progression: Crișul Negru→ Körös→ Tisza→ Danube→ Black Sea
- Tributaries
  - right: Șoimul
- River code: 3.1.42.20

The Poclușa is a left tributary of the Crișul Negru in western Romania. It flows into the Crișul Negru near Șoimi. Its length is 7 km (4.3 mi) and its basin size is 48 km^{2} (19 sq mi).
