= Sighișoara (river) =

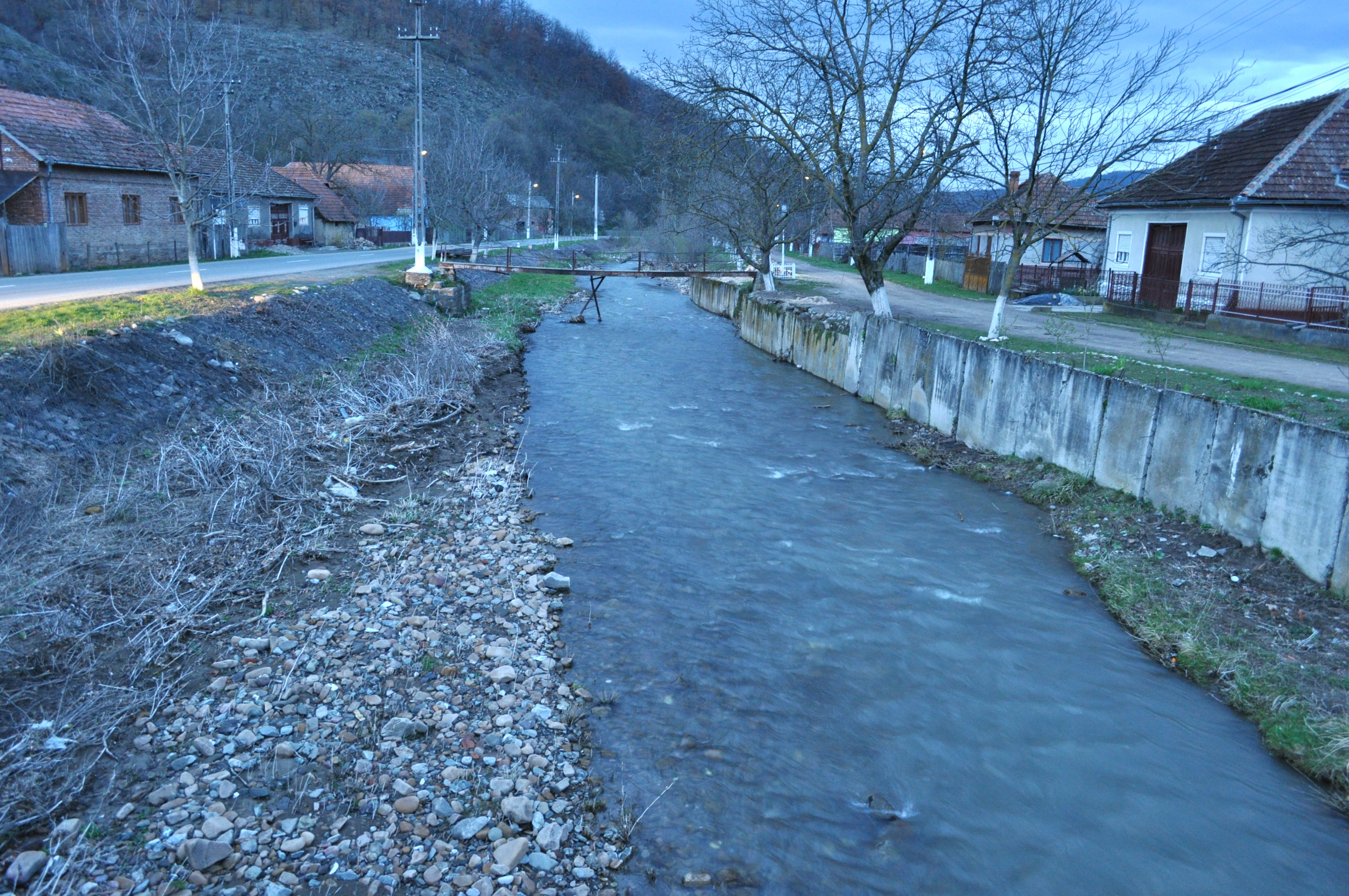

- Location within Romania

Location
- Country: Romania
- Counties: Arad County
- Villages: Mădrigești, Brazii, Honțișor, Gurahonț

Physical characteristics
- Mouth: Crișul Alb
  - location: Gurahonț
  - coordinates: 46.2689°N 22.3501°E
- Length: 18 km (11 mi)
- Basin size: 153 km^{2} (59 sq mi)

Basin features
- Progression: Crișul Alb→ Körös→ Tisza→ Danube→ Black Sea
- Tributaries
  - left: Măreasca
  - right: Șoimuș, Zeldiș, Honțiș

The Sighișoara is a left tributary of the river Crișul Alb in Romania. It discharges into the Crișul Alb in Gurahonț. Its length is 18 km (11 mi) and its basin size is 153 km^{2} (59 sq mi).
