= Erdély TV =

- Country: Romania
- Headquarters: Târgu Mureș

History
- Launched: September 15, 2008; 16 years ago

Links
- Website: ETV - Site oficial

Erdély TV is a Hungarian-language generalist television channel, from Romania, launched in 2008.
