= Székely Land =

Historical and ethnographic region of Transylvania

Székely Land Székelyföld (Hungarian) Ținutul Secuiesc (Romanian)
- Ethnographic area in Romania
- Flag Coat of arms

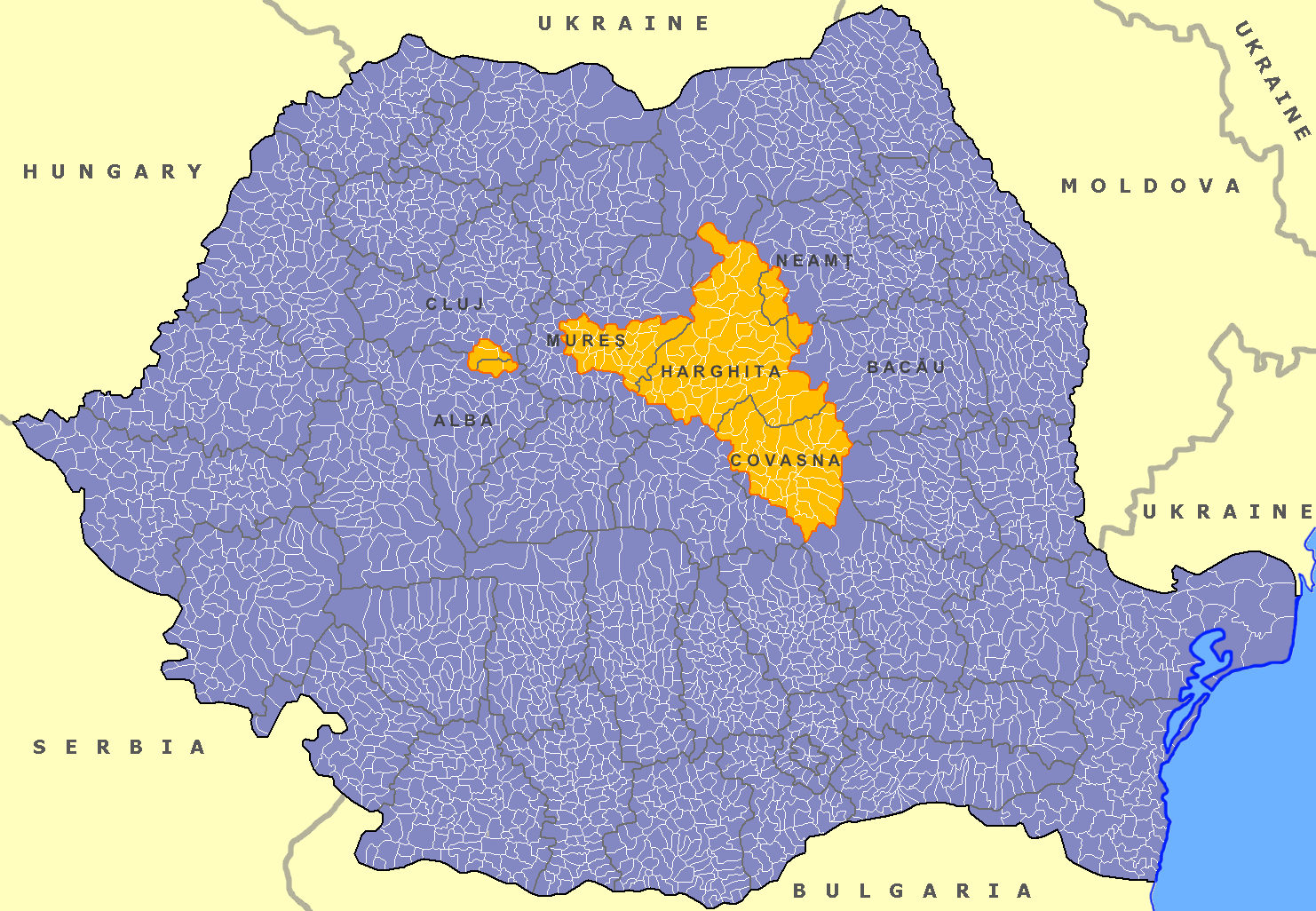
- The historical Székely seats on the map of present-day Romania
- Largest city: Târgu Mureș (Marosvásárhely)
- Common languages: Hungarian; Romanian
- Ethnic groups (2021): 57.63% Hungarians; 35.71% Romanians; 6.44% Roma; 0.22% others
- Religion (2011): 97–98% Christianity; 41–43% Catholicism; 28–30% Protestantism; 26–28% Romanian Orthodoxy; 1–2% other Christian; 2–3% undeclared / no religion

Area
  - Total: 16,943 km^{2} (6,542 sq mi)

Population
  - Estimate: 918,716
- Currency: Romanian leu (RON)
- Time zone: UTC+2 (EET)
  - Summer (DST): UTC+3 (EEST)
- Date format: dd.mm.yyyy (AD)
- Calling code: +40
- ISO 3166 code: RO
- Internet TLD: .ro

The Székely Land or Szeklerland (Hungarian: Székelyföld; Romanian: Ținutul Secuiesc) is a historical and ethnographic region of eastern Transylvania, in present-day Romania, traditionally associated with the Székelys, a subgroup of Hungarians. Its historical extent does not correspond exactly to Romania's modern administrative boundaries, but most of the region lies in present-day Harghita, Covasna, and Mureș counties. Hungarians form majorities in Harghita and Covasna, while Romanians form a majority in Mureș.

Historically, the Székely Land was organized into self-governing territorial units known as Székely seats. Their autonomy ended in 1876, when the seats were replaced by counties as part of an administrative reform in the Kingdom of Hungary. Following the Treaty of Trianon in 1920, the region became part of Romania. Most of the historical Székely areas returned to Hungary under the Second Vienna Award in 1940 and were restored to Romania after World War II. During Hungarian rule, Jews in the region were subjected to forced labour, ghettoization, and deportation to Auschwitz. In communist Romania, the Magyar Autonomous Region, created in 1952, encompassed most of the territory inhabited by Székelys; it was reorganized in 1960 and abolished in 1968.

Since 1968, the area has been administered through Romania's county system. Székely autonomy initiatives continue to seek territorial self-government for the region within Romania. The proposals remain politically contentious, and Romania's Supreme Council of National Defence has declared territorial autonomy for the Székely Land unconstitutional.

== Geography ==
Szekely Land is located in the middle of modern-day Romania, in eastern Transylvania. Its historical extent and present-day boundaries—set by the administrative divisions of Romania—are dissimilar.

The exact territory of the present-day Székely Land is not disputed. According to Minahan its territory is approximately 16,943 square kilometres (6,542 sq mi), though the autonomy proposal of the Szekler National Council consists of about 13,000 km^{2}. This size is close to the extent of the historical Székely Land, though it does not contain Aranyos Seat. The UDMR's autonomy project covers a slightly bigger territory. It includes the whole territories of Mureș, Harghita, and Covasna counties.

== History ==
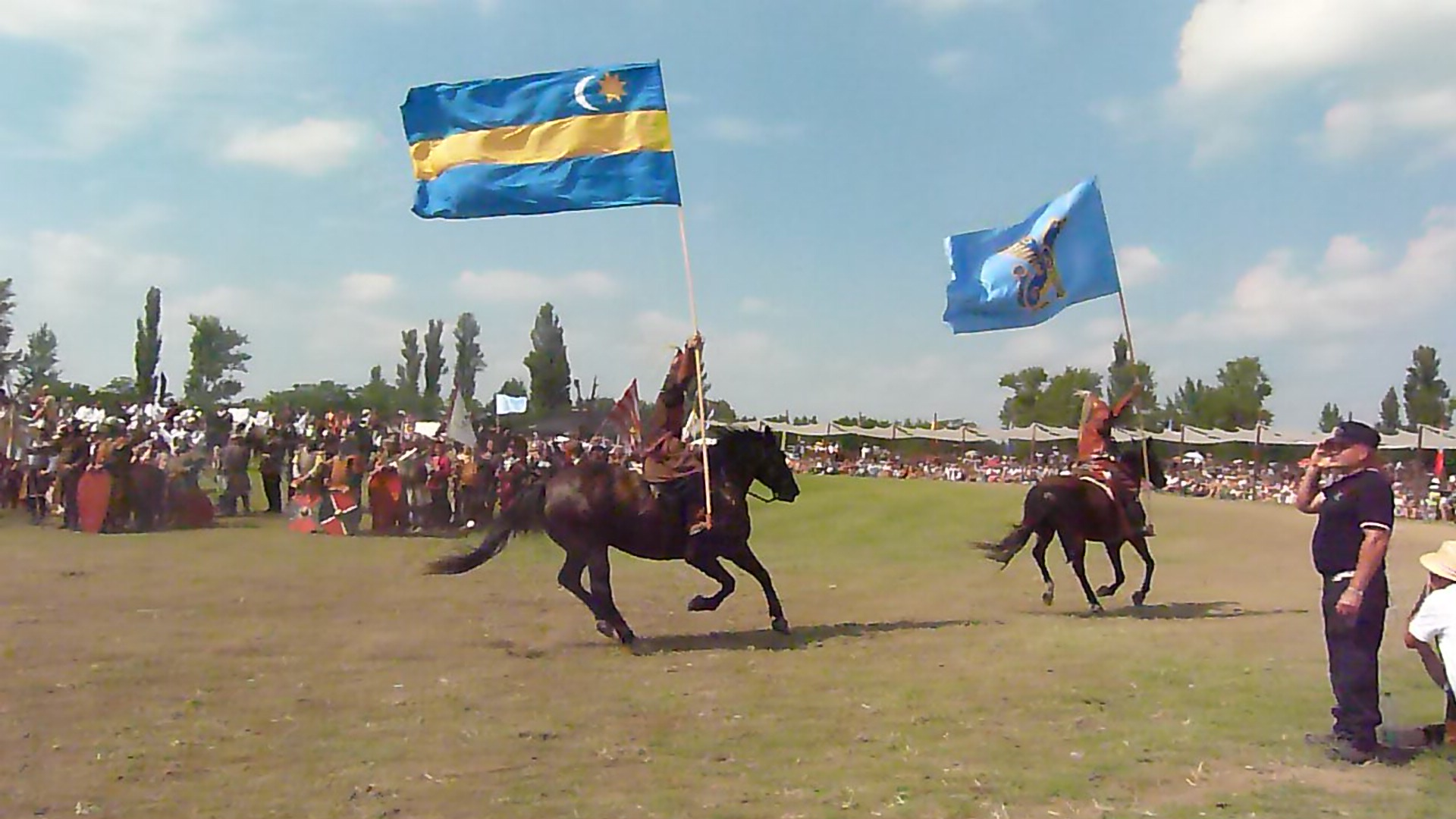
The Székely flag flown in Kurultáj in 2014

=== The ancient period ===
Transylvania was populated by Thracian peoples in the First Iron Age. The area received a large influx of Scythians from the East in the first half of the first millennium BC. The Celts appeared in Transylvania in the La Tène period (c. 4th century BC).

Dacian culture presence in southeastern Transylvania is marked by discoveries such as the flagship hoard Sâncrăieni (Harghita county) or Dacian fortresses in Covasna county (Cetatea Zânelor) or Jigodin (Harghita county).

Dacian Kingdom led by Decebal, was taken after two wars, in 106 AD by the Roman Empire under the emperor Trajan, who began organizing the new Roman province of Dacia. Southeastern Transylvania was included in the provinces of Dacia Porolissensis, Dacia Apulensis and Meuse and fortified with numerous camps such as those at Inlăceni ( Praetoria Augusta) and Sânpaul (Harghita county) Breţcu (Angustia) and Oltenia (Covasna county) or Brâncoveneşti and Călugăreni (Mureș county).

After the fall of Roman Dacia, the present-day territory of the Székely Land became part of the Thervingi kingdom "Gutthiuda". The migration of the Huns from the east pressured most of the German tribes to leave. In the Battle of Nedao the East Germanic Gepids defeated the Huns and founded Gepidia in the territory of present-day Transylvania. This marked the end of the Hunnic Empire.

=== The medieval period ===
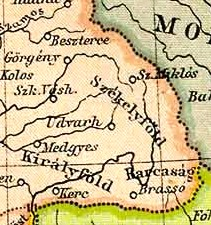
Székely Land in the 1370s

The territory of the Székely Land was part of the Avar Khaganate. During this period, Avar and Slavic groups migrated into Transylvania. From around 900 to 1526 the area was under the direct control of the Hungarian state. The Székelys presumably settled in Transylvania in the 12th century from present day Bihar and Bihor counties.

Ancient Hungarian legends suggest a connection between the Székelys and Attila's Huns. The origin of the Székely people is still debated. The Székely seats were the traditional self-governing territorial units of the Transylvanian Székelys during medieval times. (Saxons were also organised in seats.) The Seats were not part of the traditional Hungarian county system, and their inhabitants enjoyed a higher level of freedom (especially until the 18th century) than those living in the counties.

From the 12th and 13th centuries, the Székely Land enjoyed a considerable but varying amount of autonomy, first as a part of the Kingdom of Hungary, then inside the Principality of Transylvania. The autonomy was largely due to the military service the Székely provided until the beginning of the 18th century. The medieval Székely Land was an alliance of the seven autonomous Székely seats of Udvarhely, Csík, Maros, Sepsi, Kézdi, Orbai and Aranyos. The number of seats later decreased to five, when Sepsi, Kézdi and Orbai seats were united into one territorial unit called Háromszék (literally Three seats).

The main seat was Udvarhely seat, which was also called the Principal seat (Latin: Capitalis Sedes) At Székelyudvarhely (Odorheiu Secuiesc) were held many national assemblies of the Székelys A known exception is the 1554 assembly, which took place at Marosvásárhely (Târgu Mureș)

=== Modern era ===
Autonomy Statute of Szeklerland

Due to the Ottoman conquest Transylvania became a semi-independent polity. From the end of the 17th century, Transylvania became part of the Habsburg monarchy (later Austrian Empire), and governed by imperial governors. In 1848 during the Hungarian revolution and freedom war it was declared the reunion of Hungary proper and Transylvania. The Austrian emperor incited the Romanians and Serbians living in Hungary and Transylvania against the Hungarians, promising them some kind of autonomy. In 1867, as a result of the Austro-Hungarian Compromise, Transylvania become again an integral part of the Kingdom of Hungary, within Austria-Hungary.

In 1876, a general administrative reform abolished all the autonomous areas in the Kingdom of Hungary and created a unified system of counties. As a result, the autonomy of the Székely Land came to an end as well. Four counties were created in its place: Udvarhely, Háromszék, Csík, and Maros-Torda. (Only half of the territory of Maros-Torda originally belonged to the Székely Land.) The isolated Aranyosszék became a district of Torda-Aranyos county.

In December 1918, in the wake of the First World War, Romanian delegates from throughout Transylvania voted to join the Kingdom of Romania. There was an attempt in Udvarhely to found a "Székely republic" on 9 January 1919; however, its creation was unsuccessful. In 1920, by the Treaty of Trianon, Transylvania along with further territories was officially ceded to the Kingdom of Romania. The Romanian language officially replaced Hungarian in the Székely Land, but Székely county boundaries were preserved, and Székely districts were able to elect their own officials at local level and to preserve Hungarian-language education.

After 1930, the Romanian authorities began to Romanianize the Hungarian population of the Székely Land, with the presence of minorities in political life being repressed. The election of Hungarians was consistently nullified. The place-names were subjected to Romanianization. The minority languages were excised from official life and the local authorities were mostly led by appointed ethnic Romanians.

In 1940, as a result of the Second Vienna Award, Northern Transylvania became part of Hungary again; this territory included most of the historical Székely areas. Hungarian authorities subsequently restored the pre-Trianon structure with slight modifications. Ion Gigurtu's antisemitic laws, the Romanian version of Nuremberg Laws, were replaced by Hungarian ones. The Jews of the Székely Land were subjected to particularly harsh treatment. These individuals had their citizenship status reviewed, many of them being detained. In Csíkszereda (Miercurea Ciuc), dozens of families were rounded up and expelled. The men in the area were drafted into forced labor battalions. For example, 1,200 Jewish males of Marosvásárhely (Târgu Mureș) were conscripted between 1941 and 1944; over half died in Ukraine, Poland and Hungary.

However, despite discrimination and many casualties, most of the community lived in relative safety until the March 1944 occupation of Hungary by Nazi Germany. A conference devoted to the concentration of Jews in the Székely Land was held on 28 April 1944; it covered the counties of Csík, Háromszék, Maros-Torda and Udvarhely. The area's Jews were ghettoized in Szászrégen (Reghin), Sepsiszentgyörgy (Sfântu Gheorghe) and Marosvásárhely. Roundups began on 3 May 1944 and were completed within a week. The Hungarian authorities actively participated in the crimes of the Nazis. The Jews ghettoized at Sepsiszentgyörgy were later sent to Szászrégen, whence on 4 June 1944, 3,149 were boarded on a train bound for the Auschwitz concentration camp. Three transports left Marosvásáhely for Auschwitz: on 27 May, 30 May and 8 June 1944; altogether, they carried 7,549 Jews.

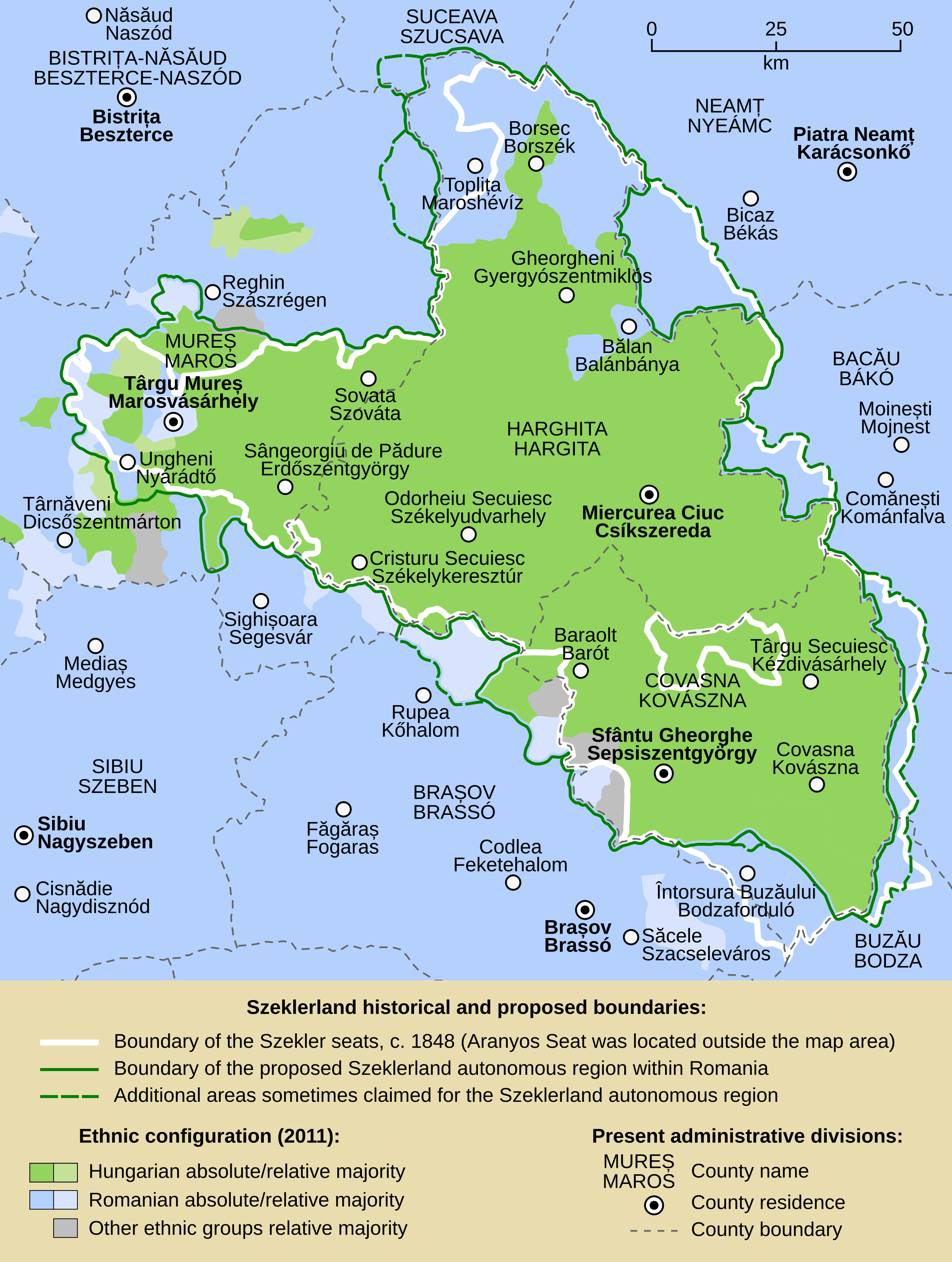
The Székely Land as envisaged by the autonomy supporters based on the historical Székely seats

On 12 September 1944, the Second Vienna Award was voided by the Allied Commission through the Armistice Agreement with Romania, and the Romanian-Soviet forces seized the area in Autumn 1944; however, the Romanian administration was expelled from these territories in October due to the activities of the Romanian paramilitary groups created in the area to avenge the atrocities committed by the Hungarians against the Romanians during the Hungarian rule in Northern Transylvania. For instance, the so-called Iuliu Maniu Guards terrorized the Székely villages, butchered the local Hungarians by axe and hatchet and operated a death camp in Feldioara. This paramilitary group was described as "a band of terrorist-chauvinistic criminals" by the Soviets. The USSR let the Romanian authorities back to the area in March 1945, and the Paris Peace Treaties officially returned Northern Transylvania to Romania.

Following the return of Northern Transylvania to Romania after World War II, the Magyar Autonomous Region, with Târgu Mureș as its capital, was created in 1952 under Soviet pressure. It encompassed most of the land inhabited by the Székelys. In 1960, the region was renamed to Mureș-Magyar Autonomous Region. It was abolished in 1968, when Romania, following an administrative reform, returned to its traditional local administrative system based on counties. Roughly speaking, present-day Harghita County encompasses the former Udvarhely and Csík, the latter including Gyergyószék; Covasna County covers more or less the territory of the former Háromszék; and what was once Maros-Torda is mostly part of present-day Mureș County. The former Aranyosszék is today divided between Cluj and Alba counties.

Nicolae Ceaușescu came to power in 1965. For the next couple of decades, due to the Romanianization efforts, a large number of ethnic Romanians settled in the Székely Land. Those Székely Hungarians who possessed degrees were subjected to resettlement. In March 1990, the city of Târgu Mureș witnessed violent clashes between ethnic Romanian and Hungarian groups.

After the fall of communism, many hoped that the former Magyar Autonomous Region, abolished by Nicolae Ceauşescu's regime, would soon be restored. This did not happen; however, there are Székely autonomy initiatives and further efforts from Székely organisations to reach a higher level of self-governance for the Székely Land within Romania.

On 4 June 2005, the Civic Forum of the Romanians of Covasna, Harghita and Mureș was founded in Miercurea Ciuc. It is an organization aimed at organizing the ethnic Romanian population in the counties that compose Székely Land.

On 2 February 2009, Romanian President Traian Băsescu met the Hungarian President László Sólyom in Budapest and discussed the issues of minority rights and regional autonomy. Băsescu stated "The Hungarian minority will never be given territorial autonomy."

In 2014, the UDMR and the Hungarian Civic Party had a joint autonomy proposal for the Székely Land, but the Szekler National Council also possessed its own suggestion.

In 2016, Hans G. Klemm, the United States Ambassador to Romania, together with other local officials, were pictured with a Székely flag during his visit to the Székely Land. The photo was posted by the mayor of Sfântu Gheorghe on Facebook. The reactions of the politicians in Bucharest were turbulent. In a response Klemm affirmed that the only two flags that are important to him, as a diplomat, are the U.S. and the Romanian ones.

Traditional Székely Land (19th century)

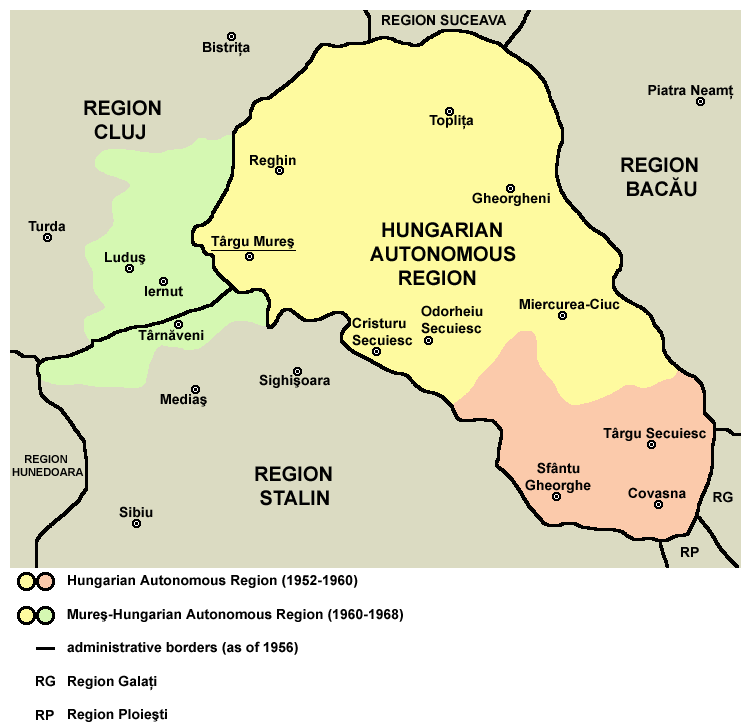
Hungarian autonomous provinces under the Communist era

Present-day counties of Harghita, Covasna, and Mureș within Romania

=== Constitutional issues ===
Article 1 of the Romanian Constitution defines the country as a "sovereign, independent, unitary and indivisible national state." It has often been argued that, as a result of this provision, any ethnic-based territorial autonomy, including that of the Székely Land, would be unconstitutional.

The Supreme Council of National Defence of Romania declared that an autonomy of the so-called Székely Land would be unconstitutional.

== Population ==
In 2002 the estimated ethnic composition of the Székely Land (Mureș, Covasna and Harghita counties) consisted of Hungarians (66%), Romanians (29%), Germans (1%) and Roma (4%). The area forms a Hungarian ethnic enclave within present-day Romania.

The population of the historical Székely Land (according to the 2002 census) is 409,000, 312,043 of them Hungarians, accounting for 76.65% of the total. The Hungarians represent 59% of the populations of Harghita, Covasna and Mureș counties. The percentage of Hungarians is higher in Harghita and Covasna (84.8% and 73.58% respectively), and lower in Mureș County, (38.82%).

According to the 2011 official census, 570,033 Hungarians (53.22%) live in the counties of Covasna, Harghita and Mureș (out of a total population of 1,071,890 inhabitants). In Mureș county the Romanians have a slight majority (52.6%), while in the counties of Covasna and Harghita, the Hungarians make up the majority (79.6% and 85.9%). The 2011 census compared to the data of the previous census (2002) also shows that the Romanian ethnic ratio in the Székely Land has been decreasing (due to emigration).

Târgu Mureș is the home for the largest community of Hungarians in Romania (60,669 in 2011), but the town itself has a Romanian majority (69,702 out of 134,290 inhabitants).

Important centers of the Székely Land are Târgu-Mureș (Marosvásárhely), Miercurea Ciuc (Csíkszereda), Sfântu Gheorghe (Sepsiszentgyörgy), and Odorheiu Secuiesc (Székelyudvarhely).

Romania according to ethnic group in Harghita, Covasna and Mureș (Censuses 1930–2021); Source: National Institute of Statistics - INS Romania
Ethnic group			1930			1956			1966			1977			1992			2002			2011			2021		
Ethnic group			Harghita	Covasna	Mureș	Harghita	Covasna	Mureș	Harghita	Covasna	Mureș	Harghita	Covasna	Mureș	Harghita	Covasna	Mureș	Harghita	Covasna	Mureș	Harghita	Covasna	Mureș	Harghita	Covasna	Mureș
Hungarians	%		86.61	76.69	41.59	89.55	79.07	45.18	88.14	79.43	44.46	85.07	78.45	44.31	84.72	75.24	41.42	84.65	73.82	39.31	85.21	73.74	38.09	85.67	71.77	35.58
Hungarians	Pop		216,615	116,961	176,990	245,300	136,388	231,875	248,886	140,472	249,675	277,587	156,120	268,251	295,104	175,502	252,651	276,038	164,158	228,275	257,707	150,468	200,858	232,157	133,444	165,014
Hungarians	Total	%	61.65			63.94			62.60			62.08			60.70			59.20			58.91			57.63		
Hungarians	Total	Pop	510,566			613,563			639,033			701,958			723,257			668,471			609,033			530,615		
Romanians	%		9.99	19.94	43.55	9.38	18.21	47.49	11.07	19.28	49.57	13.73	19.57	49.10	14.05	23.40	52.05	14.07	23.29	53.27	12.96	22.06	52.60	12.41	22.99	54.42
Romanians	Pop		24,996	30,405	185,367	25,694	31,416	243,720	31,272	34,099	278,386	44,794	38,948	297,205	48,948	54,586	317,541	45,870	51,790	309,375	39,196	45,021	277,372	33,634	42,752	252,400
Romanians	Total	%	29.07			31.35			33.68			33.69			35.34			36.05			34.98			35.71		
Romanians	Total	Pop	240,768			300,830			343,757			380,947			421,075			407,035			361,589			328,786		
Romani	%		1.08	2.02	4.10	0.55	2.00	2.69	0.49	0.83	2.03	0.99	1.77	3.31	1.10	1.13	5.70	1.18	2.69	6.96	1.76	4.05	8.90	1.82	5.11	9.68
Romani	Pop		2,702	3,080	17,444	1,514	3,450	13,804	1,390	1,465	11,402	3,228	3,522	20,019	3,827	2,641	34,798	3,835	5,973	40,425	5,326	8,267	46,947	4,928	9,507	44,880
Romani	Total	%	2.80			1.96			1.40			2.37			3.46			4.45			5.86			6.44		
Romani	Total	Pop	23,226			18,768			14,257			26,769			41,266			50,233			60,540			59,315		

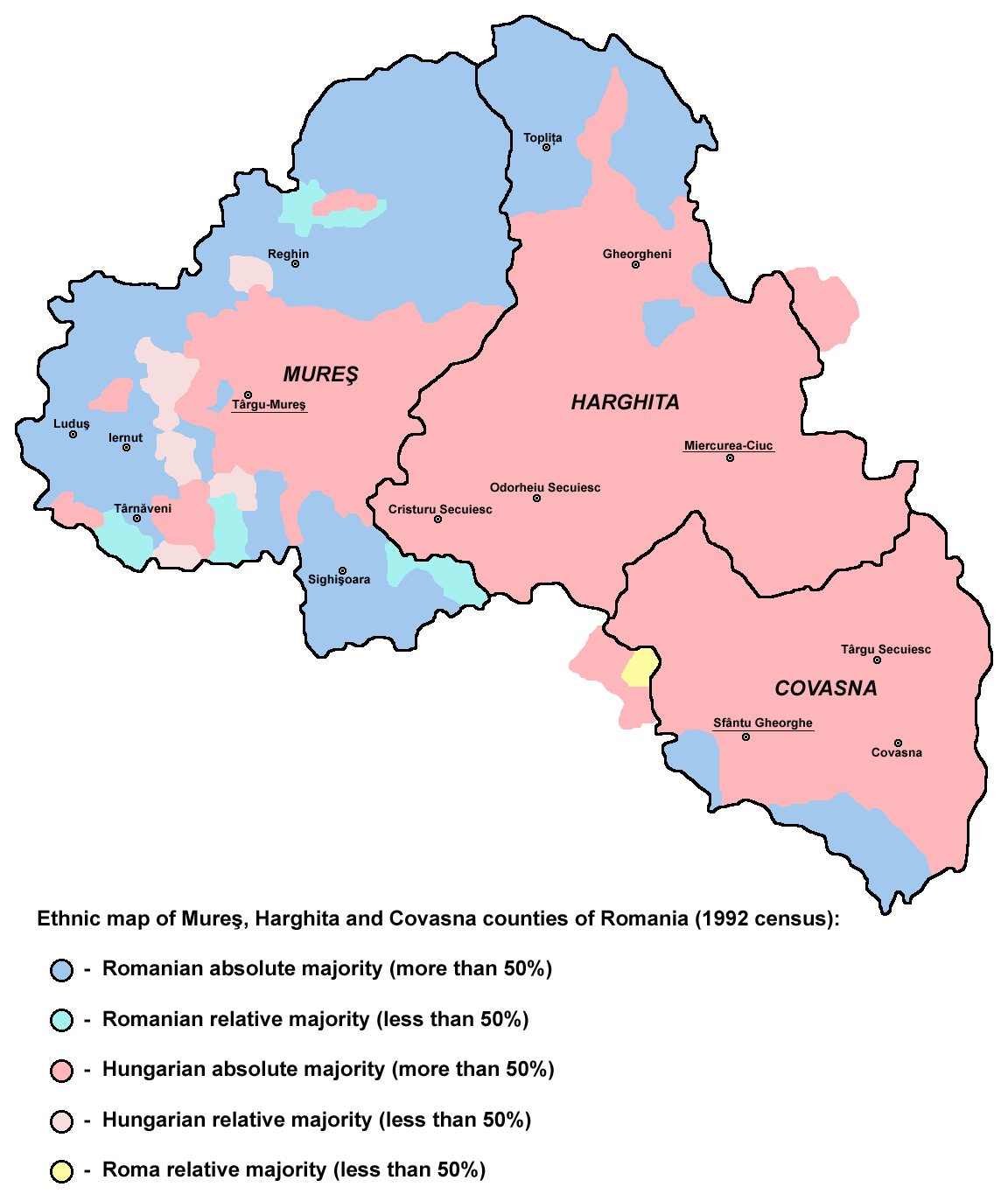
Ethnic map of Harghita, Covasna, and Mureș based on the 1992 data, showing areas with Hungarian majority

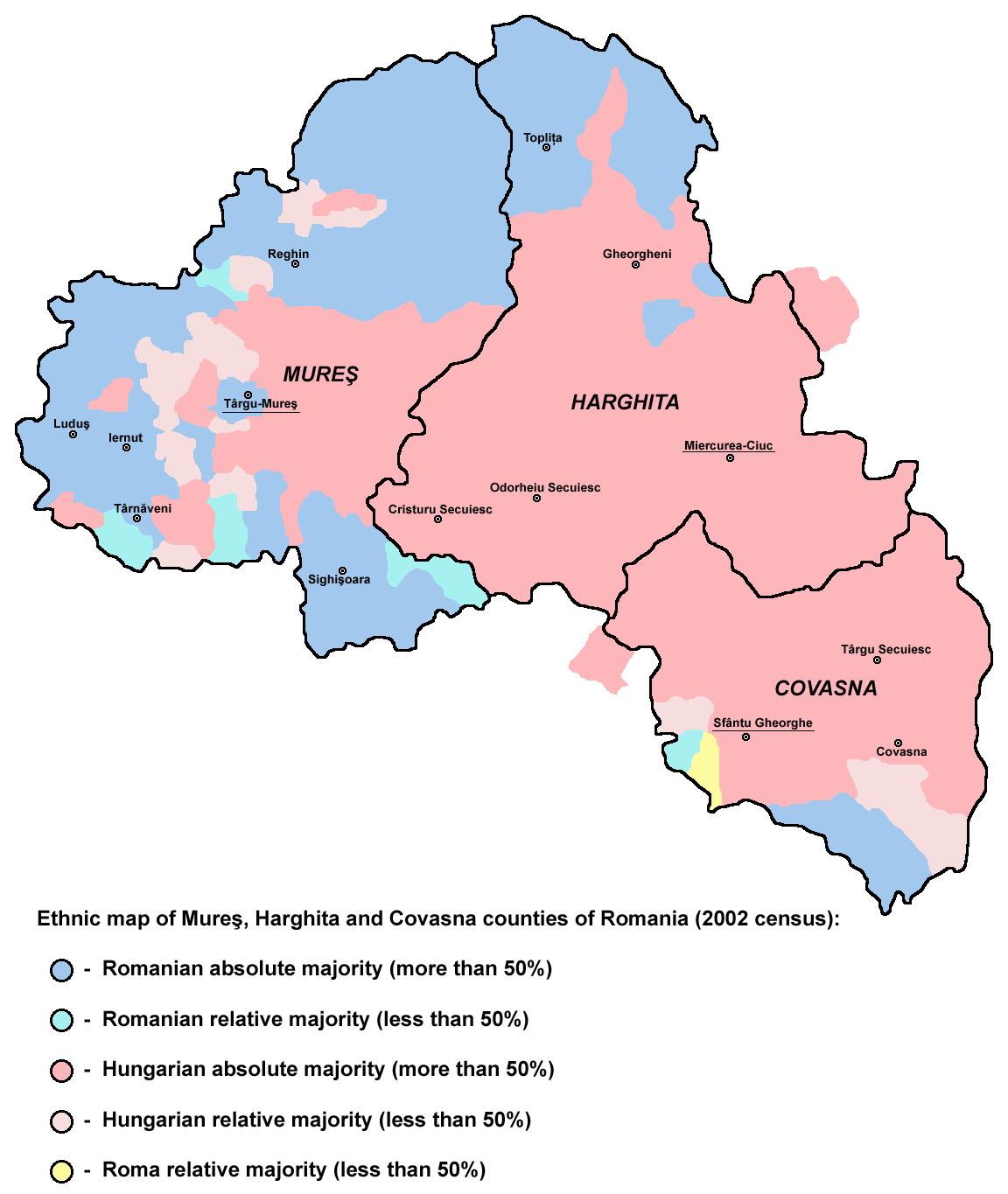
Ethnic map of Harghita, Covasna, and Mureș based on the 2002 data, showing areas with Hungarian majority

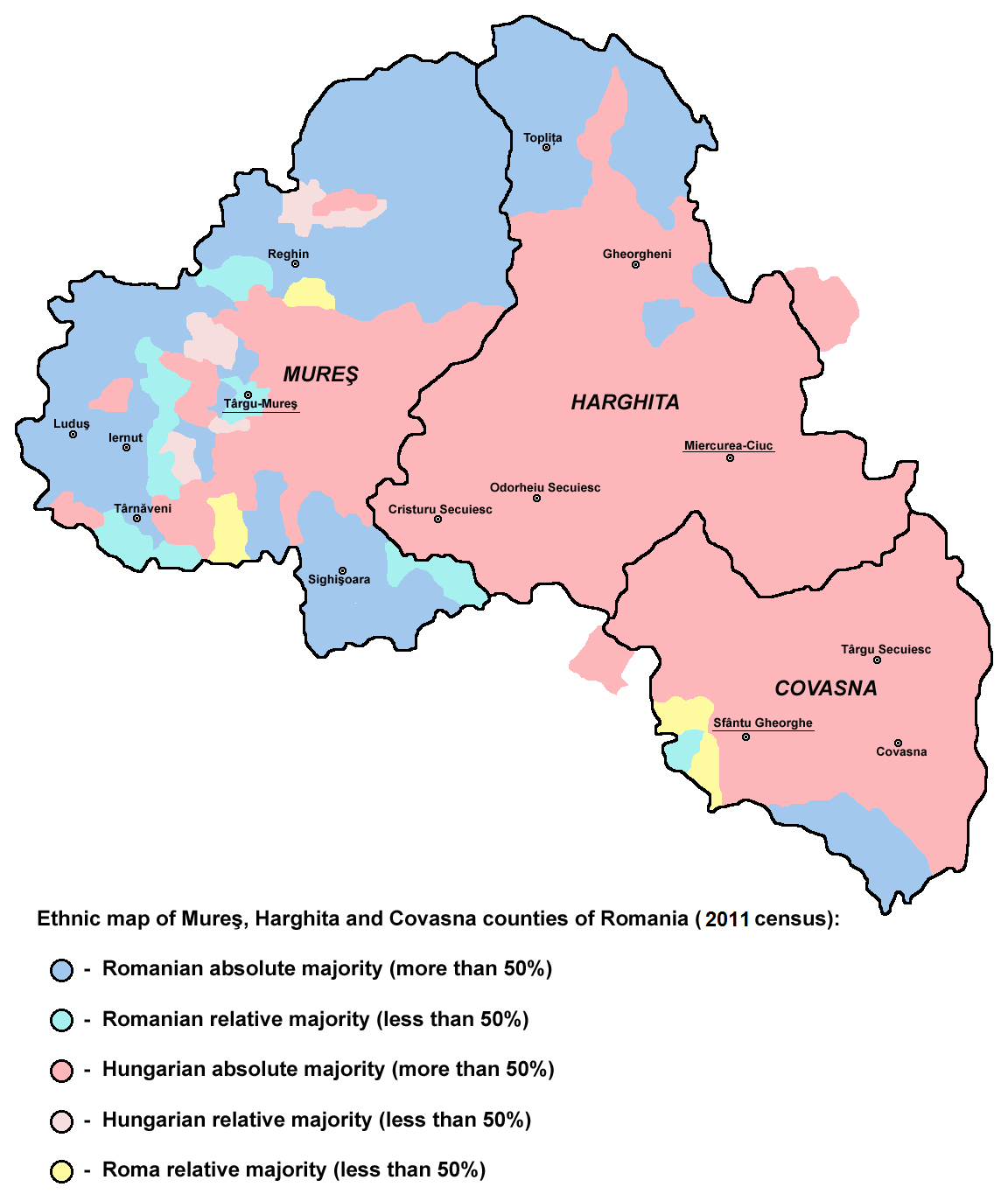
Ethnic map of Harghita, Covasna, and Mureș based on the 2011 data, showing areas with Hungarian majority

== Culture ==
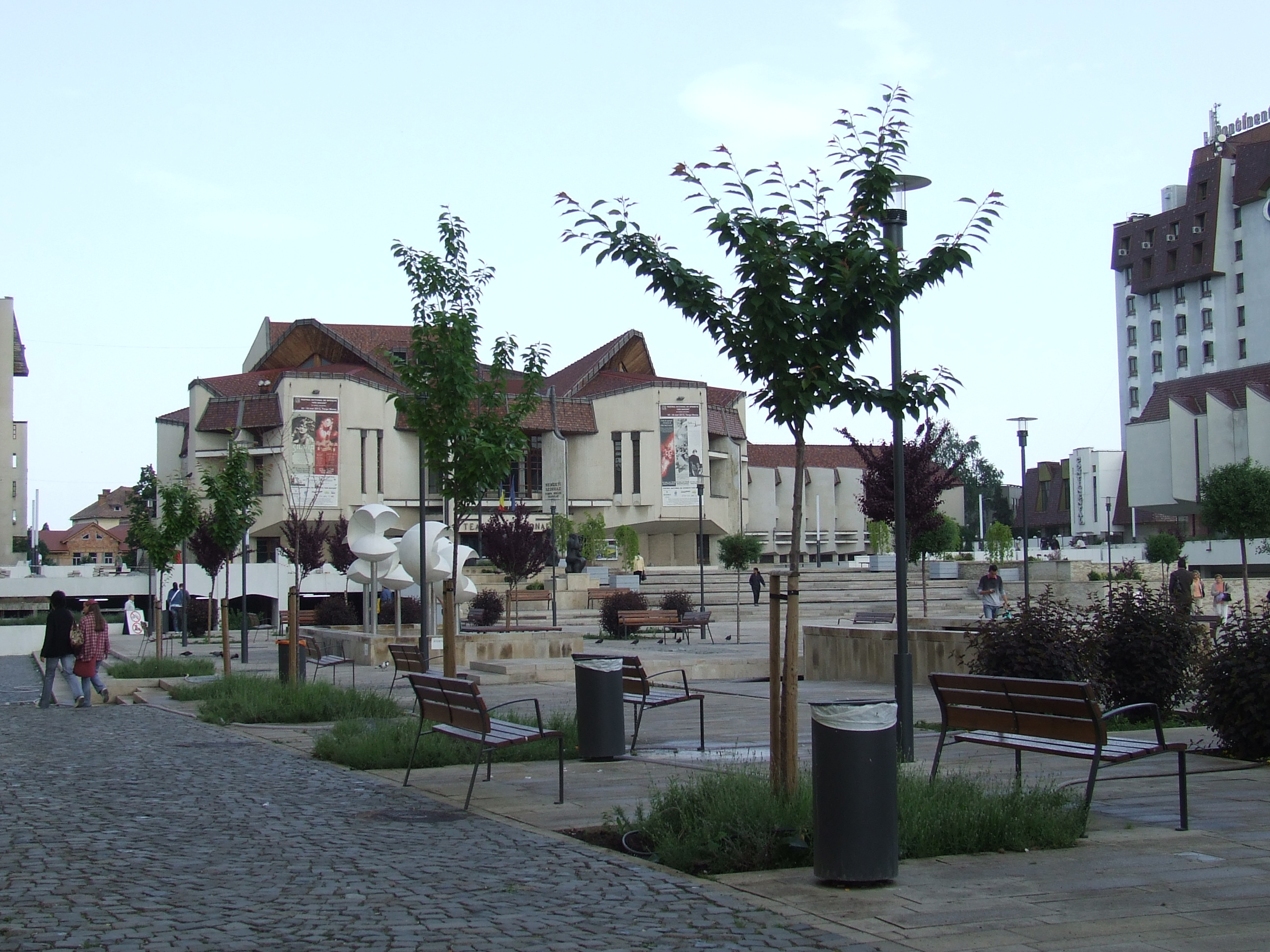
The contemporary building of the Târgu Mureș National Theatre inaugurated in 1973

Târgu Mureș (Marosvásárhely), the largest settlement in the region, is regarded as the cultural centre of the Székely Land.

=== Theatres and orchestras ===
- Târgu Mureș National Theatre is the continuator of the Székely Theater established in 1946 by Miklós Tompa; it has two language sections, Hungarian and Romanian
- Tamási Áron Theatre in Sfântu Gheorghe, established in 1948
- Ariel Theatre for Children and Youth in Târgu Mureș, established in 1949 (Hungarian and Romanian sections)
- Târgu Mureș State Philharmonic Orchestra, established in 1950
- Figura Stúdió Theatre in Gheorgheni (1990)
- Csíki Játékszín Municipal Theatre in Miercurea Ciuc (1998)
- Tomcsa Sándor Theatre in Odorheiu Secuiesc (1998)

=== Mass media ===
==== Public ====
- TVR Târgu Mureș (Hungarian and Romanian sections)
- Radio Târgu Mureș (Hungarian and Romanian sections)

==== Private ====
- Erdély TV (Târgu Mureș)
- Erdély FM (Târgu Mureș)
- Radio GaGa (Târgu Mureș)
- Sepsi Rádió (Sfântu Gheorghe)
- Siculus Rádió (Târgu Secuiesc)

== Education ==
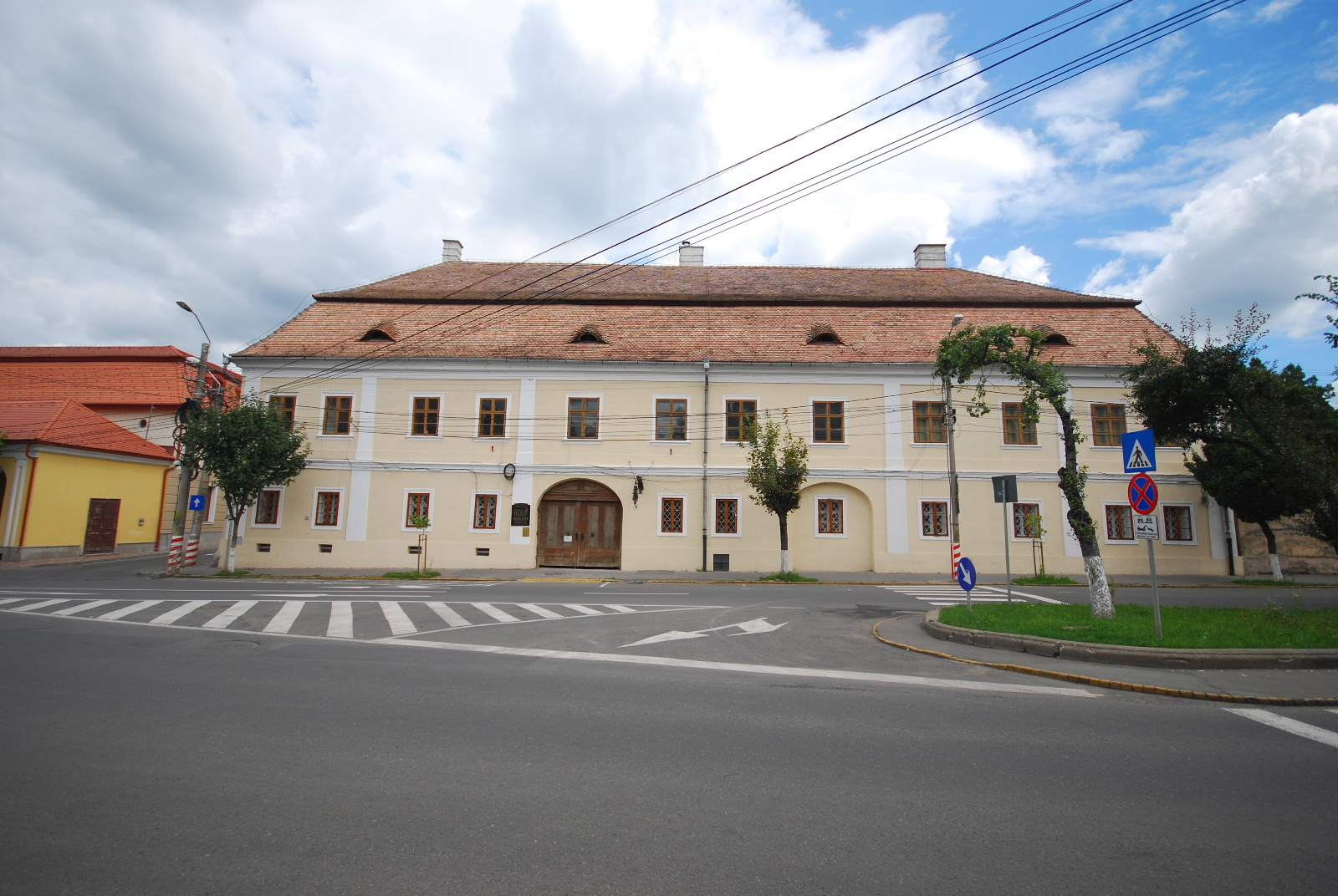
Teleki-Bolyai Library

- Teleki Library in Târgu Mureș (1802)
- University of Medicine, Pharmacy, Science and Technology of Târgu Mureș (1945)
- University of Arts Târgu Mureș (1946)
- Sapientia University (2001) (in Târgu Mureș and Miercurea Ciuc)

The following is a list of the most known high schools of each city:

- Târgu-Mureș/Marosvásárhely: Bolyai Farkas, Unirea, Alexandru Papiu Ilirian
- Sovata/Szováta:Domokos Kázmér
- Odorheiu-Secuiesc/Székelyudvarhely: Tamási Áron, Benedek Elek
- Cristuru-Secuiesc/Székelykeresztúr: Orbán Balázs
- Miercurea Ciuc/Csíkszereda: Márton Áron, Octavian Goga
- Gheorgheni/Gyergyószentmiklós: Salamon Ernő
- Toplița/Maroshévíz: O. C. Tăslăuanu
- Sfântu-Gheorghe/Sepsiszentgyörgy: Székely Mikó, Mihai Viteazul, Mikes Kelemen
- Târgu-Secuiesc/Kézdivásárhely: Nagy Mózes
- Covasna/Kovászna: Kőrösi Csoma Sándor

Those in italic have the Romanian language as their medium of instruction.

== Sport ==
The Székely ice hockey team Sport Club of Csíkszereda, with mainly home trained, local players (Székelys), plays simultaneously in the Erste League (Hungarian League) and in the Romanian Ice Hockey Championship. Starting with the 2010/2011 season, the Sport Club ice hockey team participated at the championships under the name HSC Csíkszereda and that year it won its first Erste League title as well.

The team's main achievements so far: The Romanian Championship (fifteen times winner): 1949, 1952, 1957, 1960, 1963, 1997, 2000, 2004, 2007, 2008, 2009, 2010, 2011, 2012, 2013. The Romanian Cup (ten times winner): 1950, 1952, 1995, 2001, 2003, 2006, 2007, 2010, 2011, 2014. Pannonian League (one-time winner): 2004. Erste League (one-time winner): 2011.

The majority of the Romanian men's national ice hockey team consist of Székely players. The national team are ranked 28th in the 2010 IIHF World Rankings and currently compete in Division IIA.

The Székely Land football team represents the Székely Land in ConIFA competitions.

== Tourist attractions ==
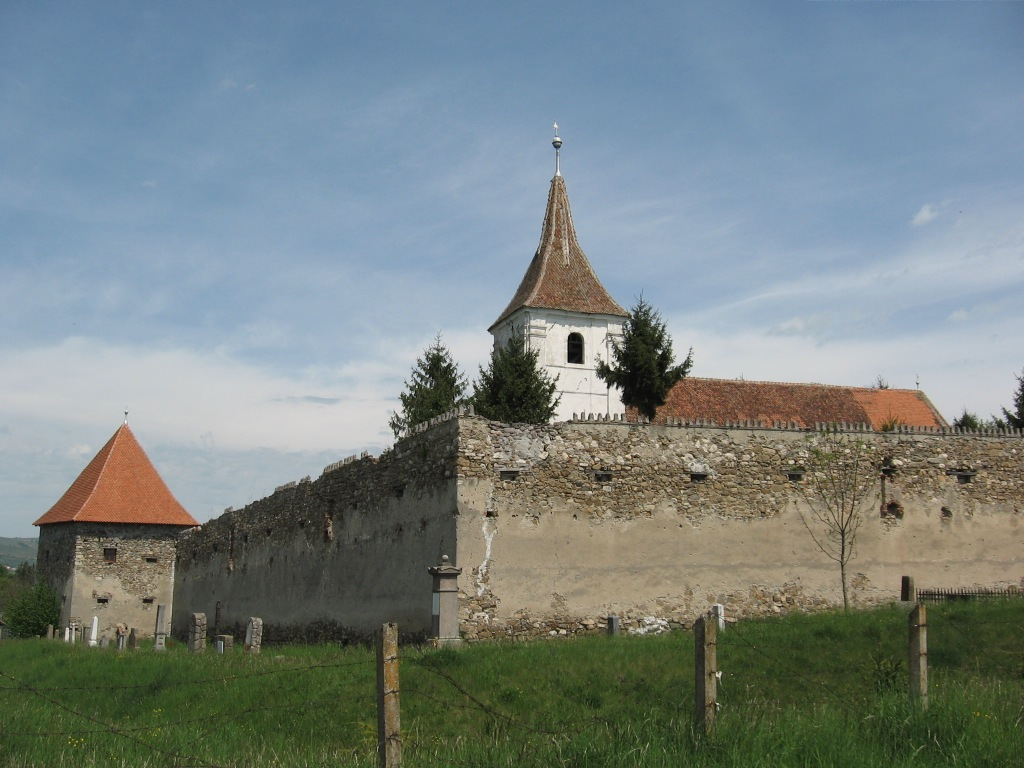
Fortified church of Aita Mare

- Székely fortified churches – more than 20 Székely villages count fortified churches
- Baroque church at Șumuleu Ciuc (Csíksomlyó), a major Roman Catholic pilgrimage site
- Rural tourism
- Hiking in the Carpathians
- Mofette, spas
- Mineral springs, thermal baths
- Salt mines (treatment against allergy and asthma)
- Traditional Székely handicrafts (pottery, wood carving)
- Mikó Castle
- Kálnoky Castle
- Teleki Library
- Székely National Museum (Muzeul Național Secuiesc/Székely Nemzeti Múzeum), Sfântu Gheorghe/Sepsiszentgyörgy
- Székely Museum of Ciuc (Muzeul Secuiesc al Ciucului/Csíki Székely Múzeum), Miercurea-Ciuc/Csíkszereda
- The Former Seat of the County Council (Fostul Sediu al Scaunelor / Vármegyeháza), Sfântu Gheorghe/Sepsiszentgyörgy

== Image gallery ==
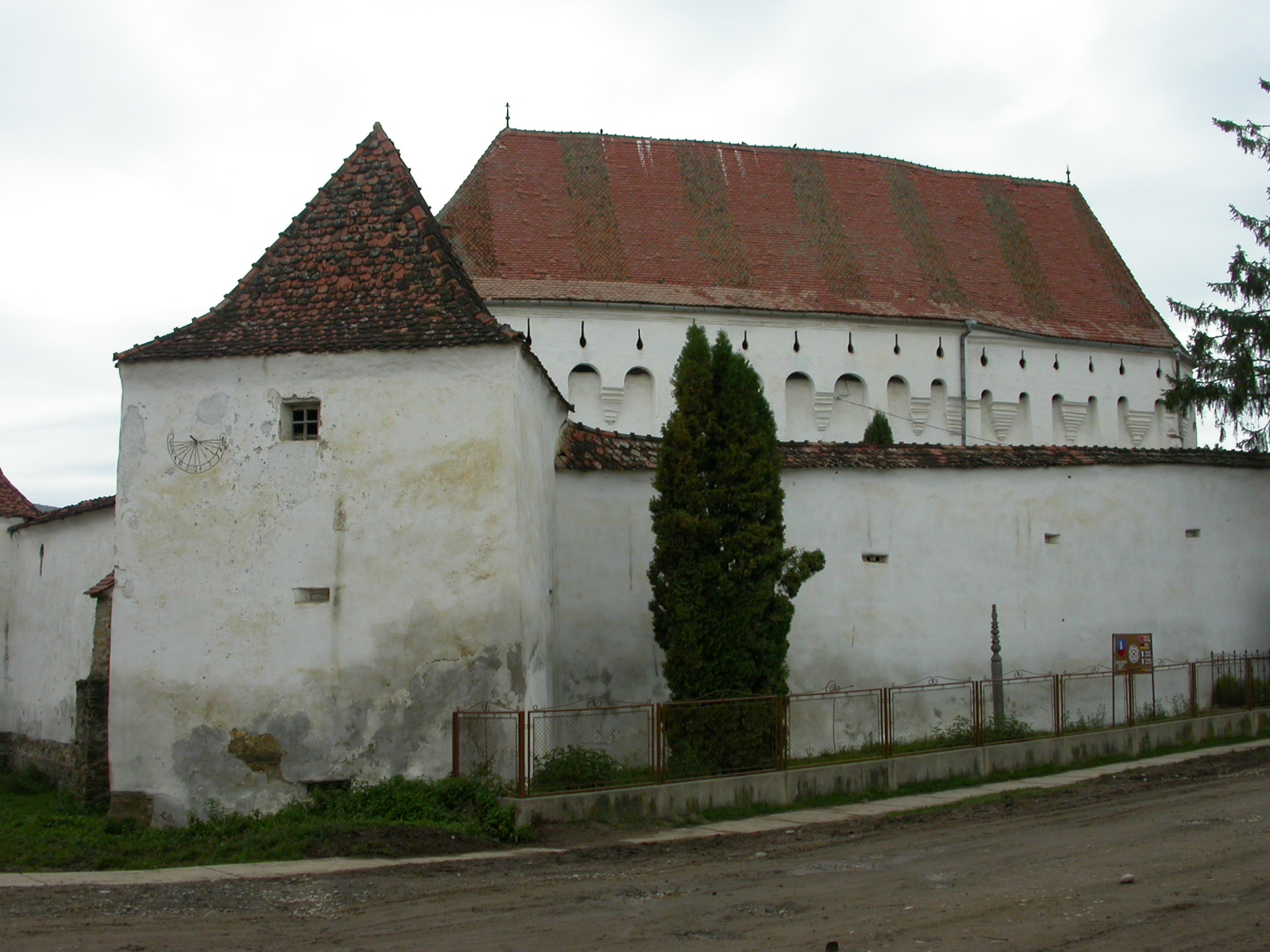
The fortified church of Dârjiu (Székelyderzs) is on UNESCO's World Heritage List

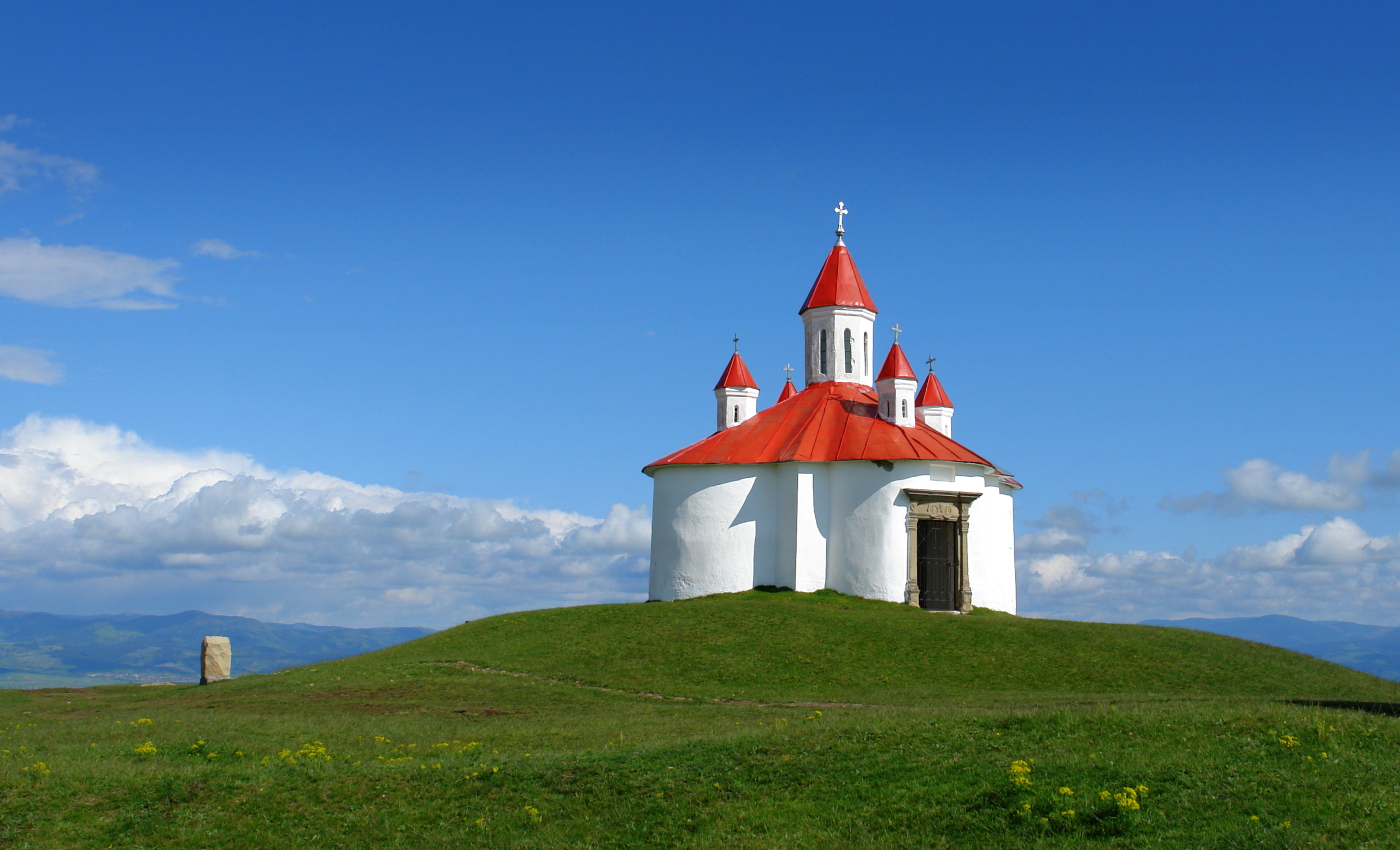
St. Stephen chapel of Sânzieni (Kézdiszentlélek), originally built in the 12th century

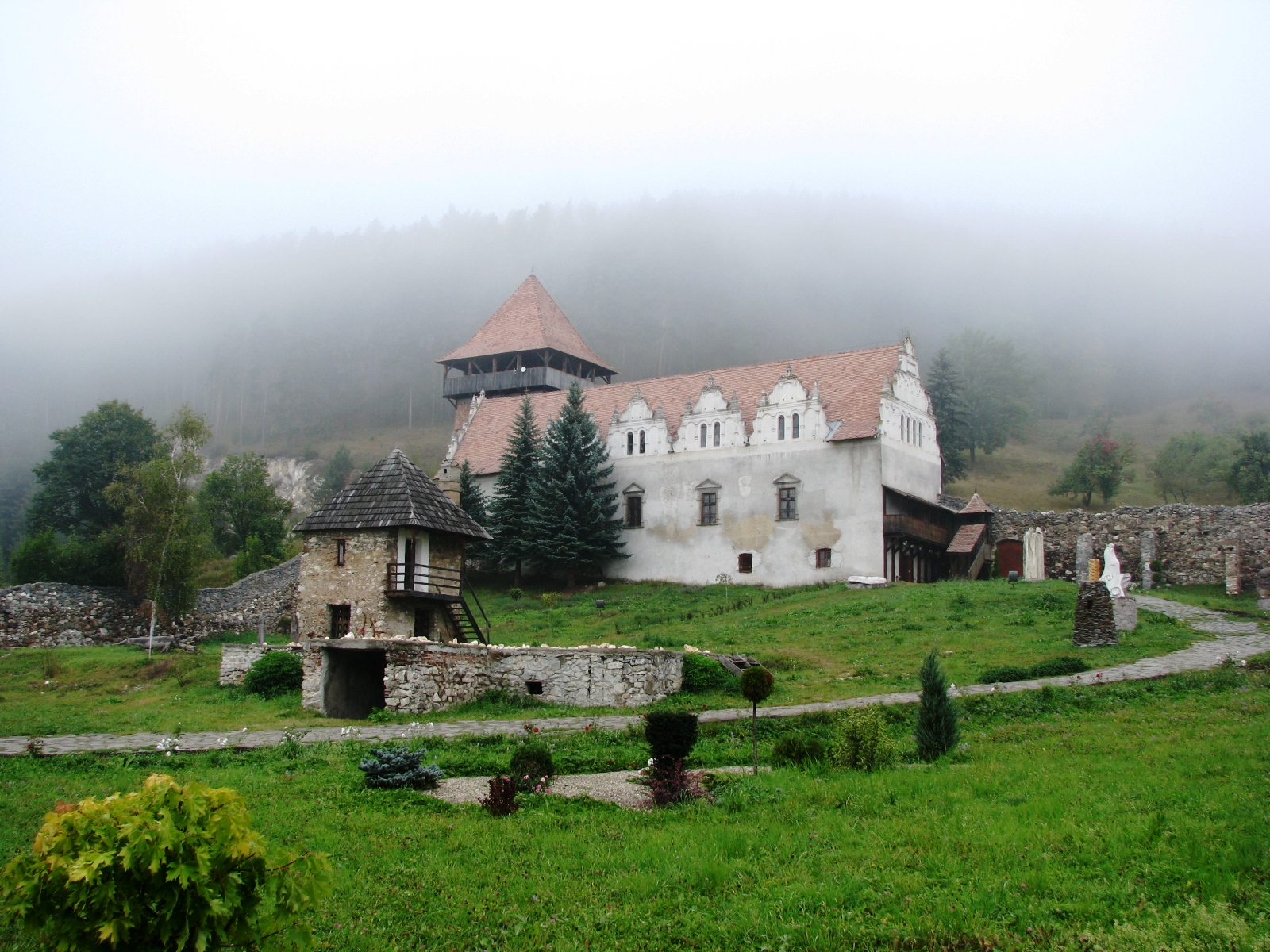
Lázár Castle

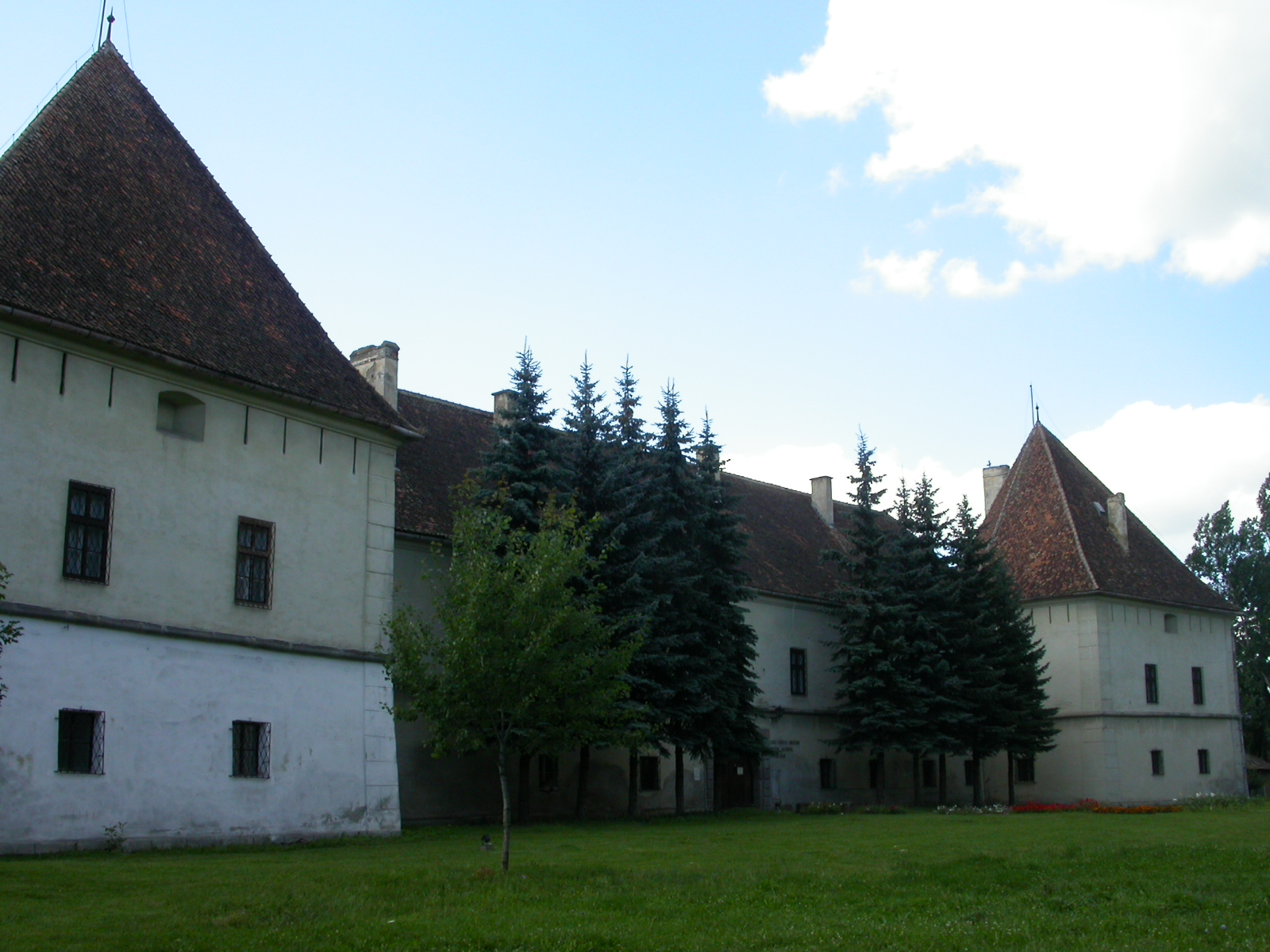
Mikó Castle

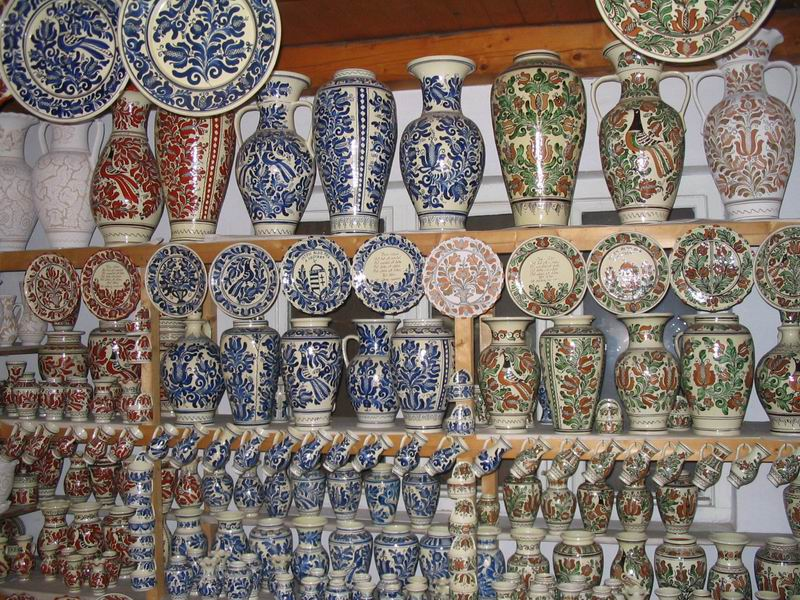
Pottery shop in Corund (Korond)

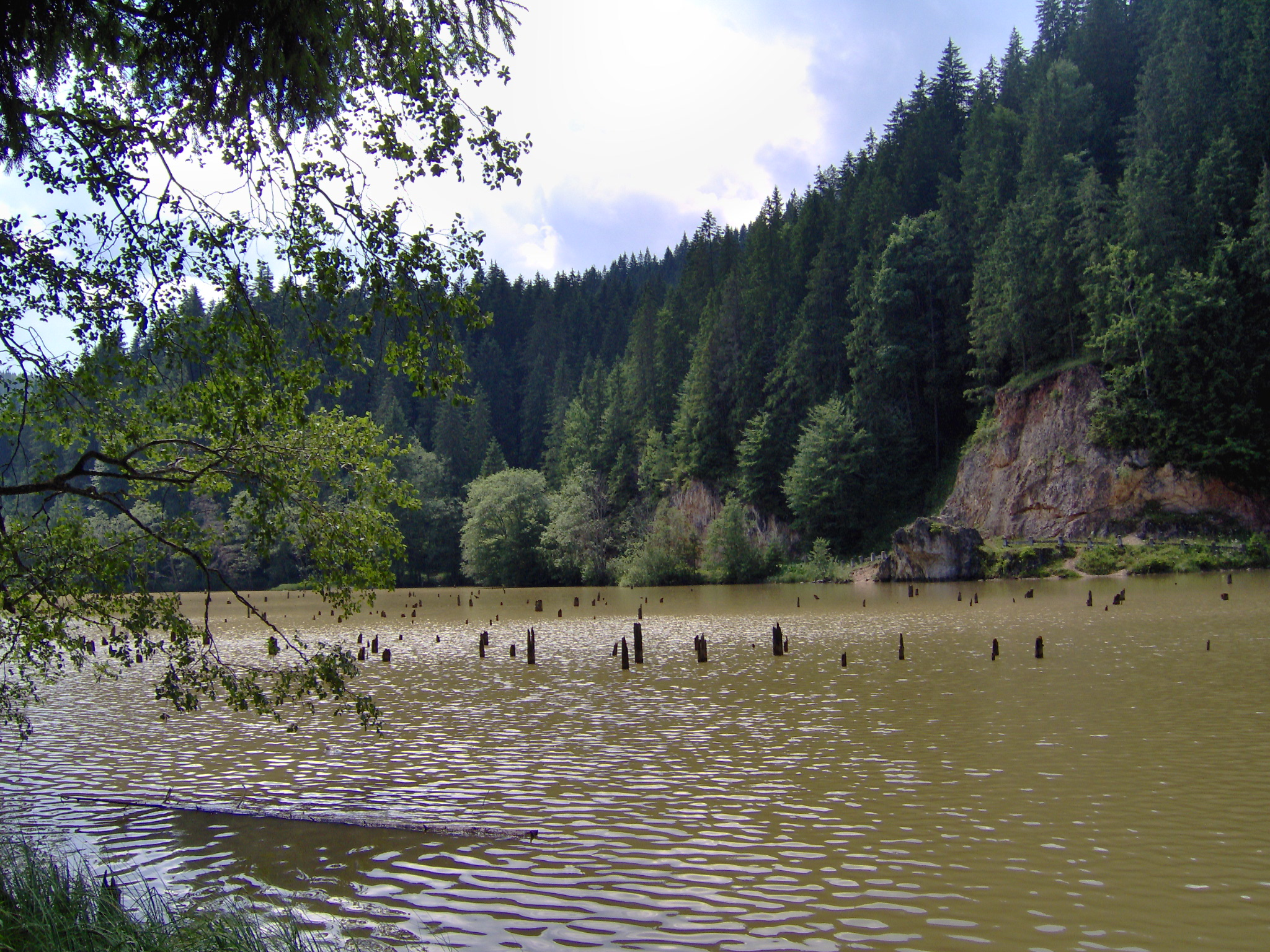
Mountains surrounding the Red Lake

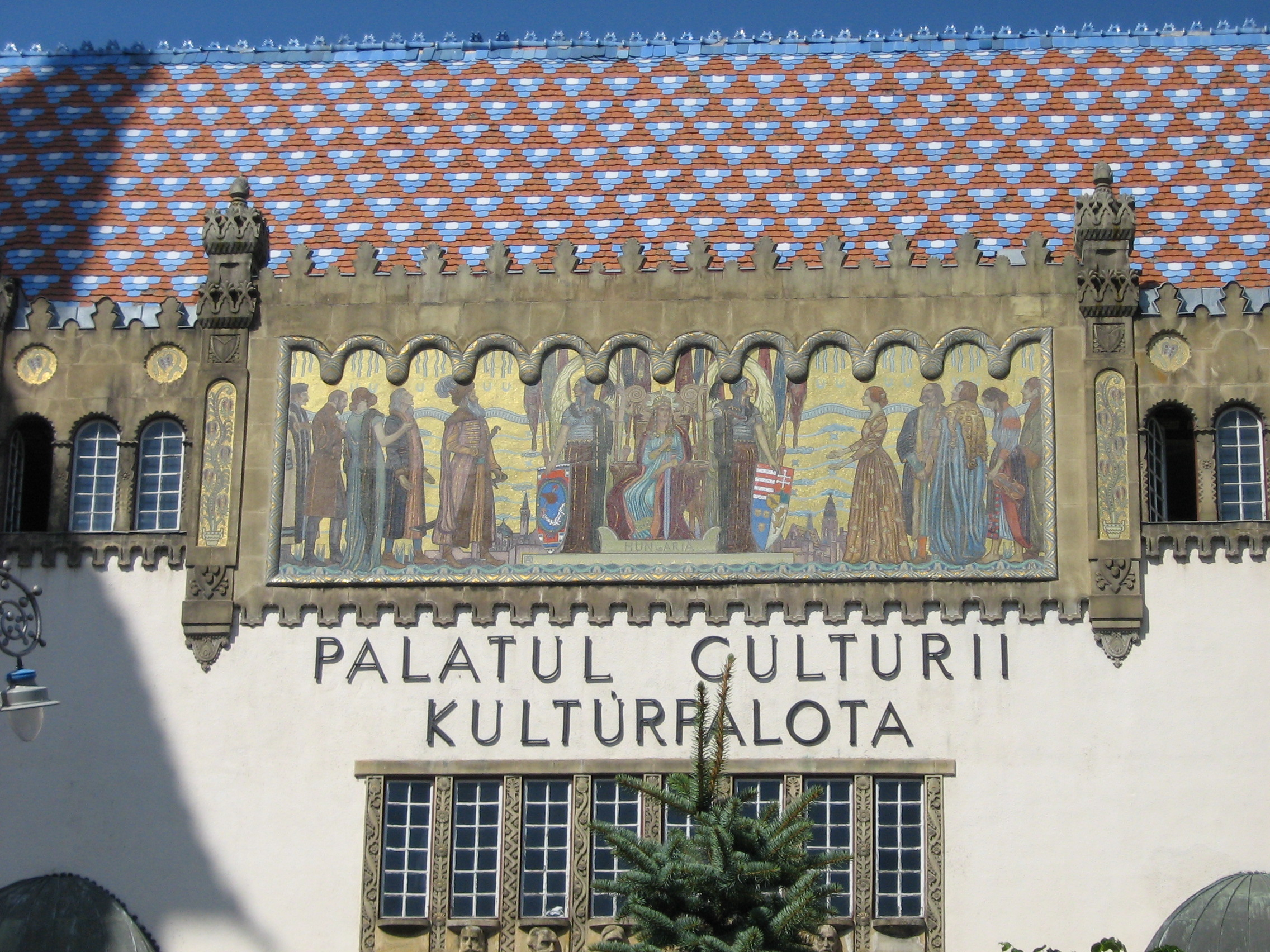
Palace of Culture, Târgu Mureș (Marosvásárhely)

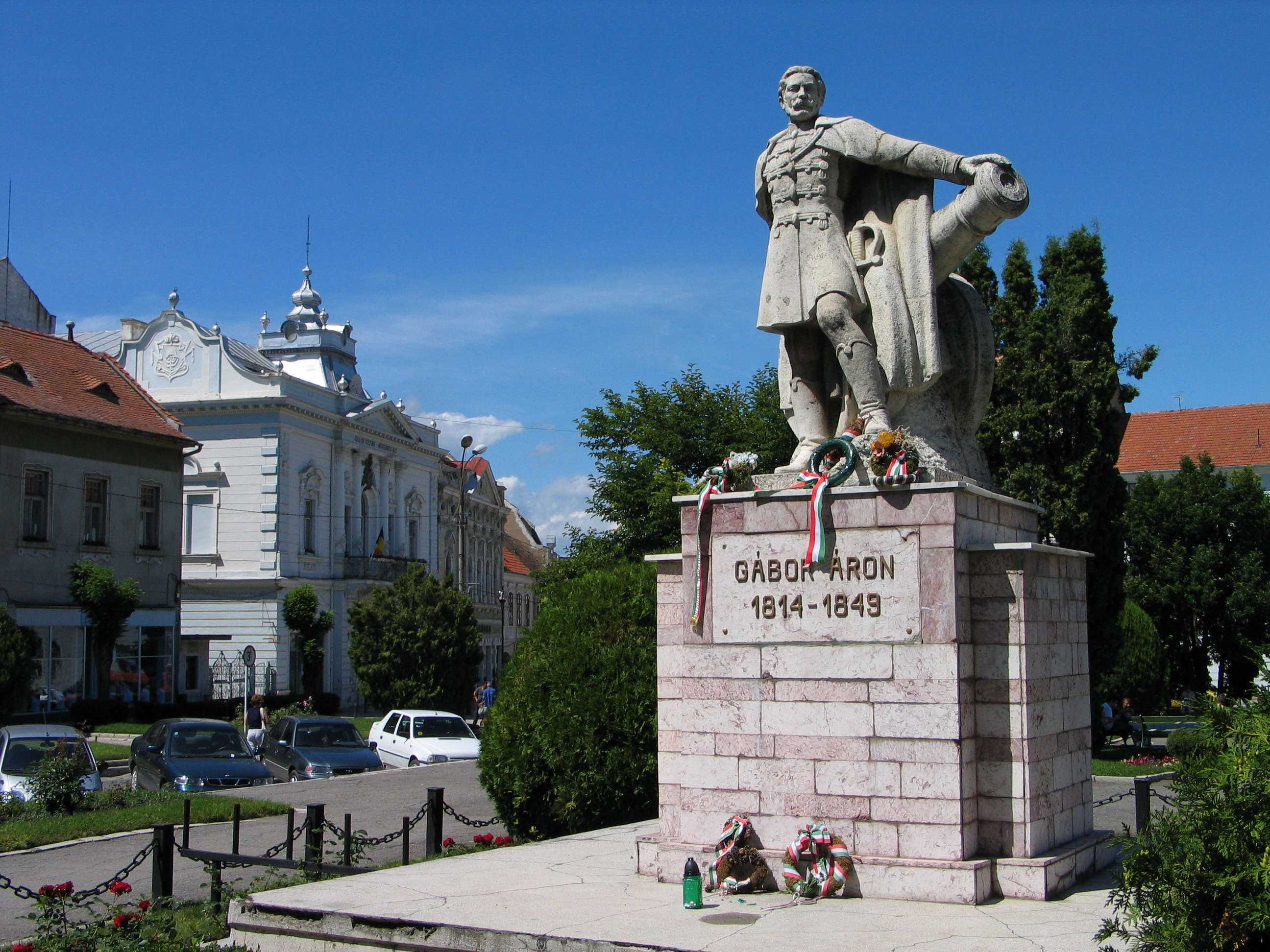
Târgu Secuiesc (Kézdivásárhely), town in the Székely Land

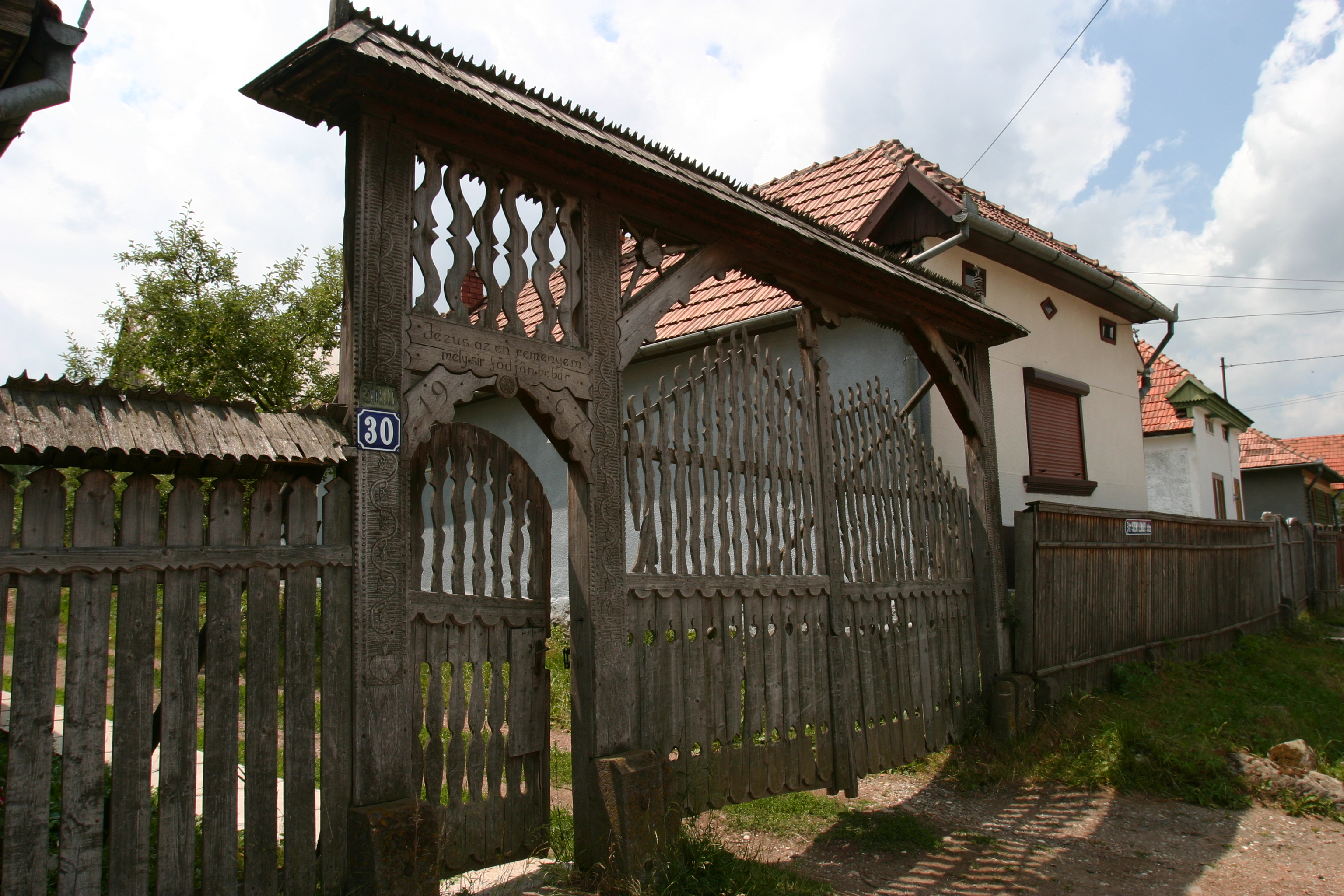
A typical Székely gate in Remetea (Gyergyóremete)

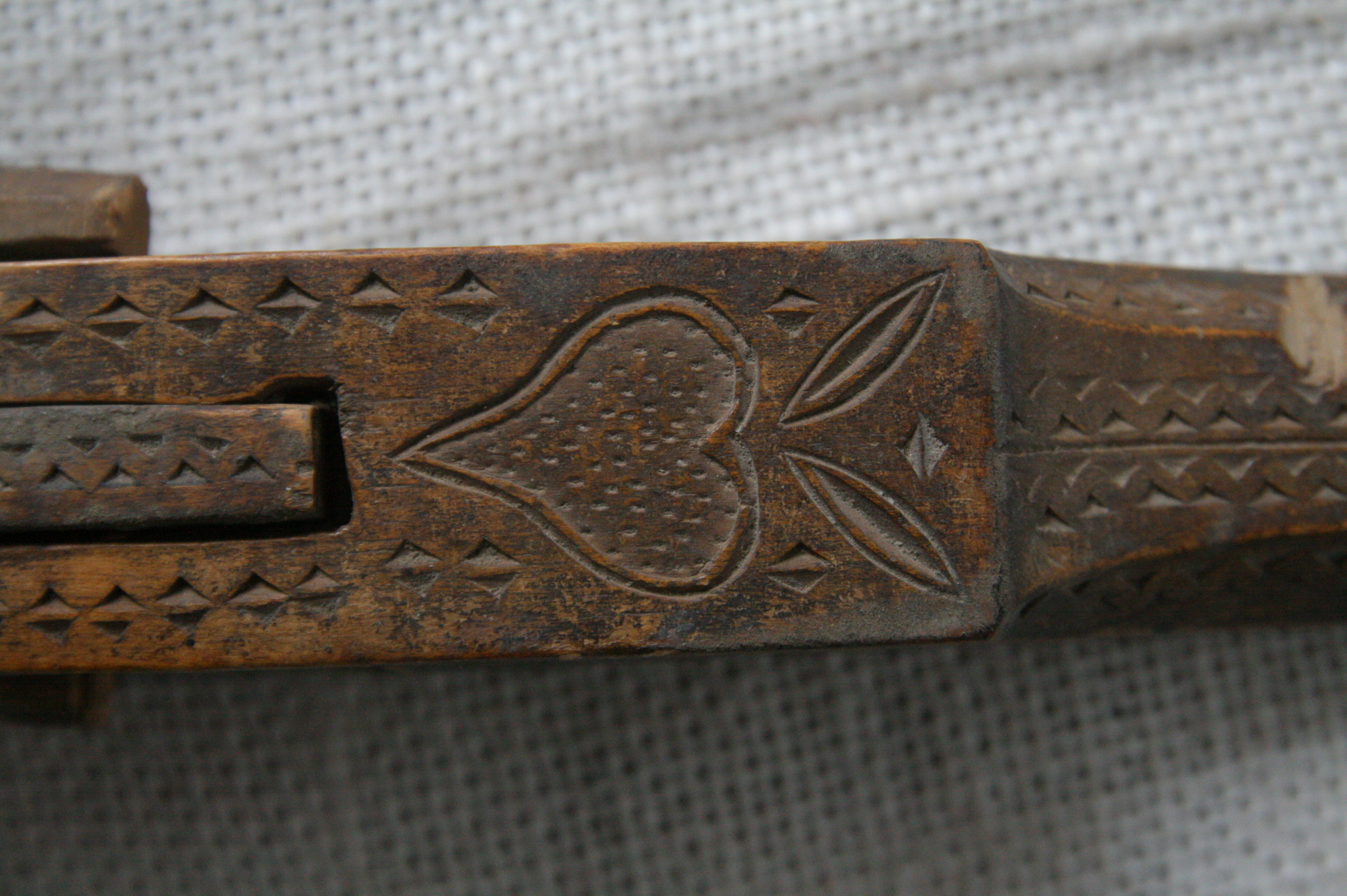
Decorated wooden weaving tool from the Székely Land

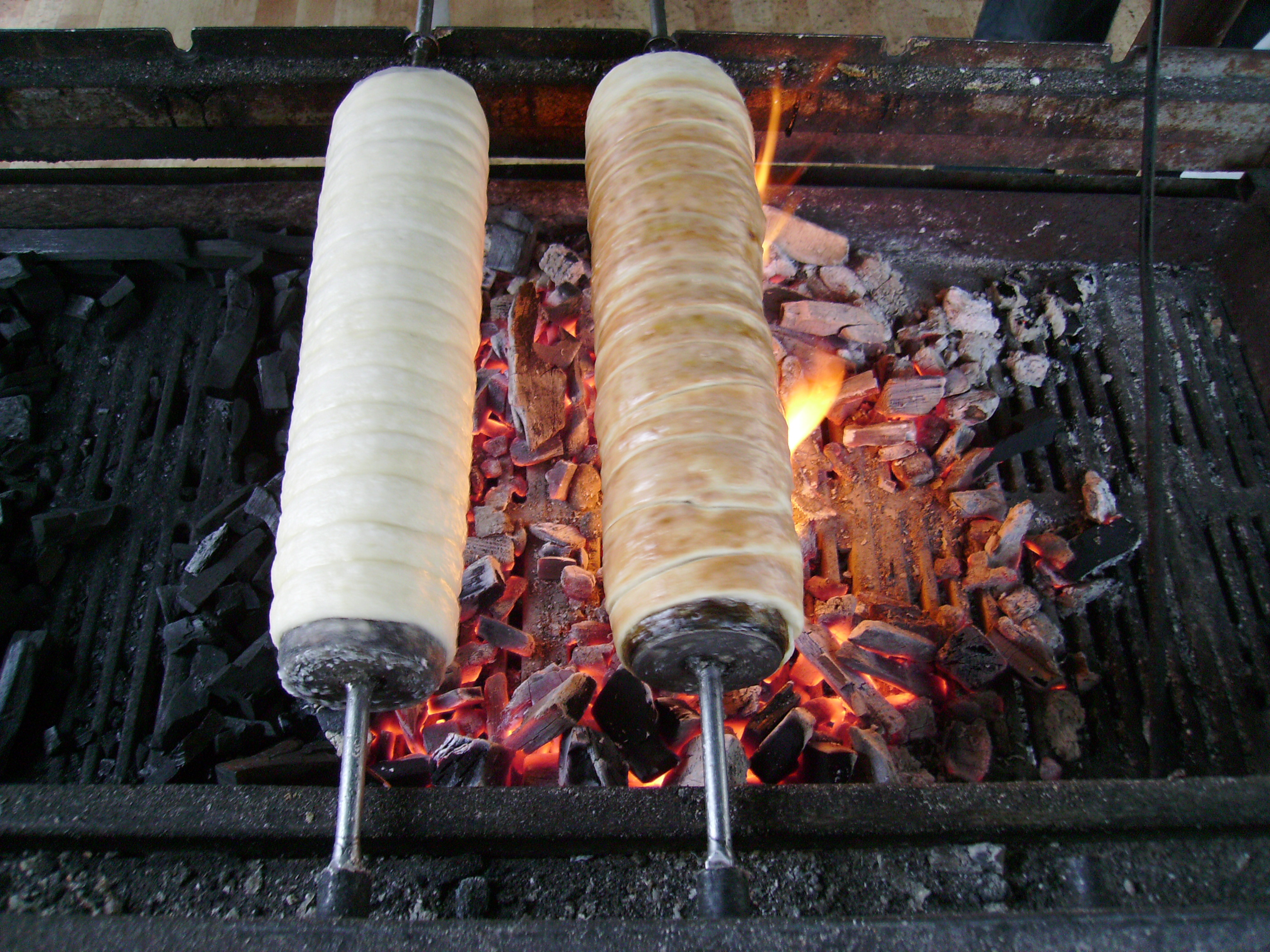
Kürtőskalács, a local treat

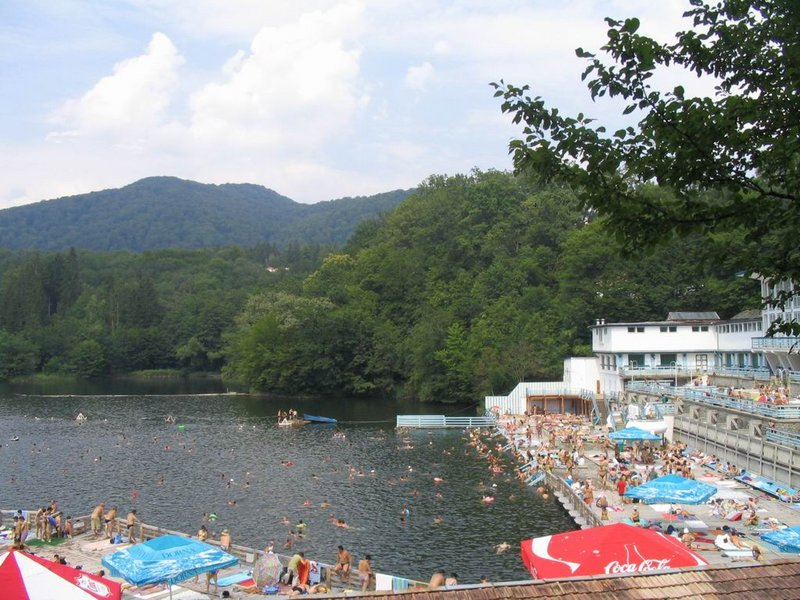
Salt-water lake in Sovata (Szováta)

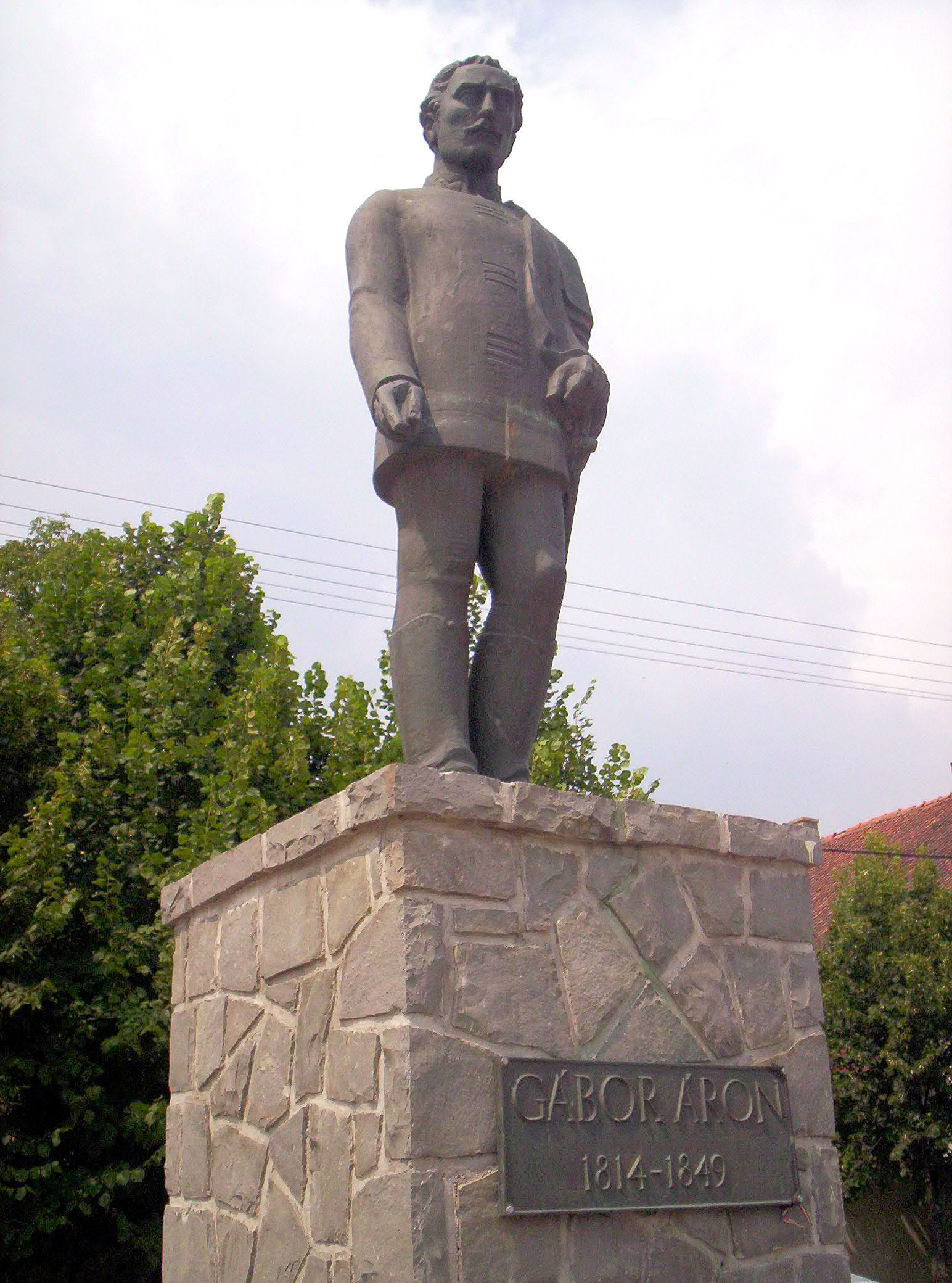
Áron Gábor's sculpture in Brețcu (Bereck)

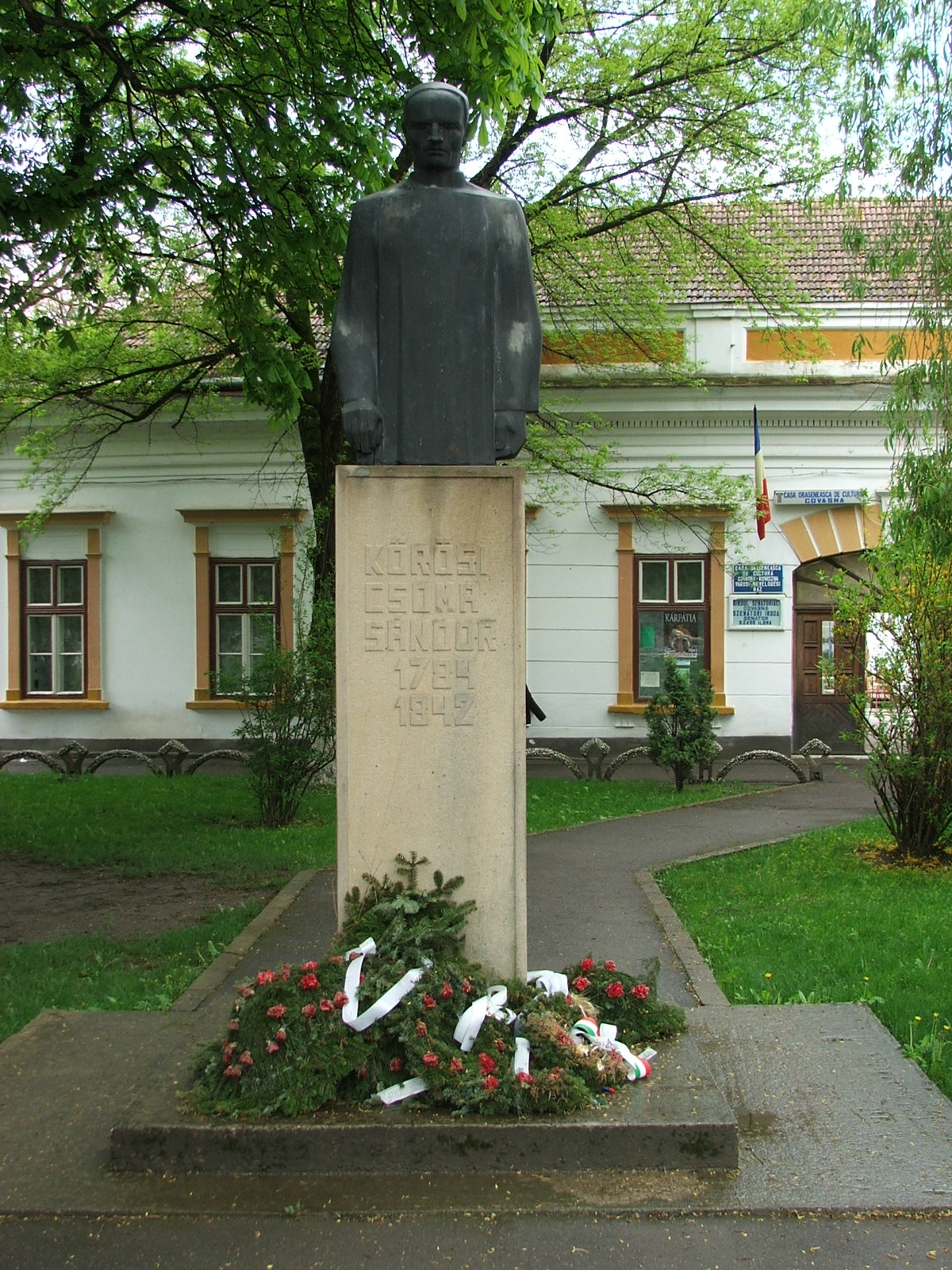
Sándor Kőrösi Csoma' statue in Covasna (Kovászna)

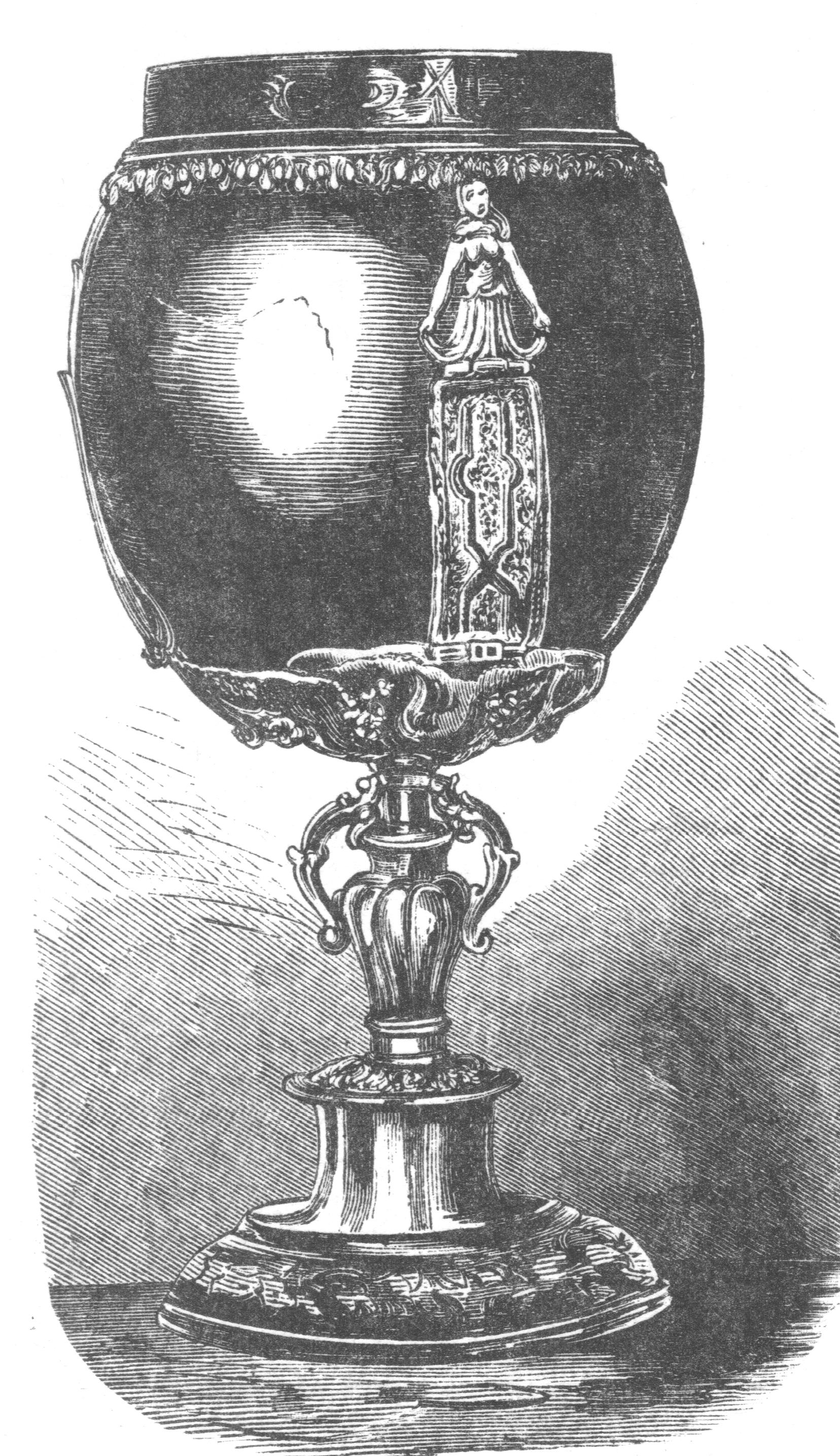
Sacrifice cup – Csíkszentmihályi Sándor family

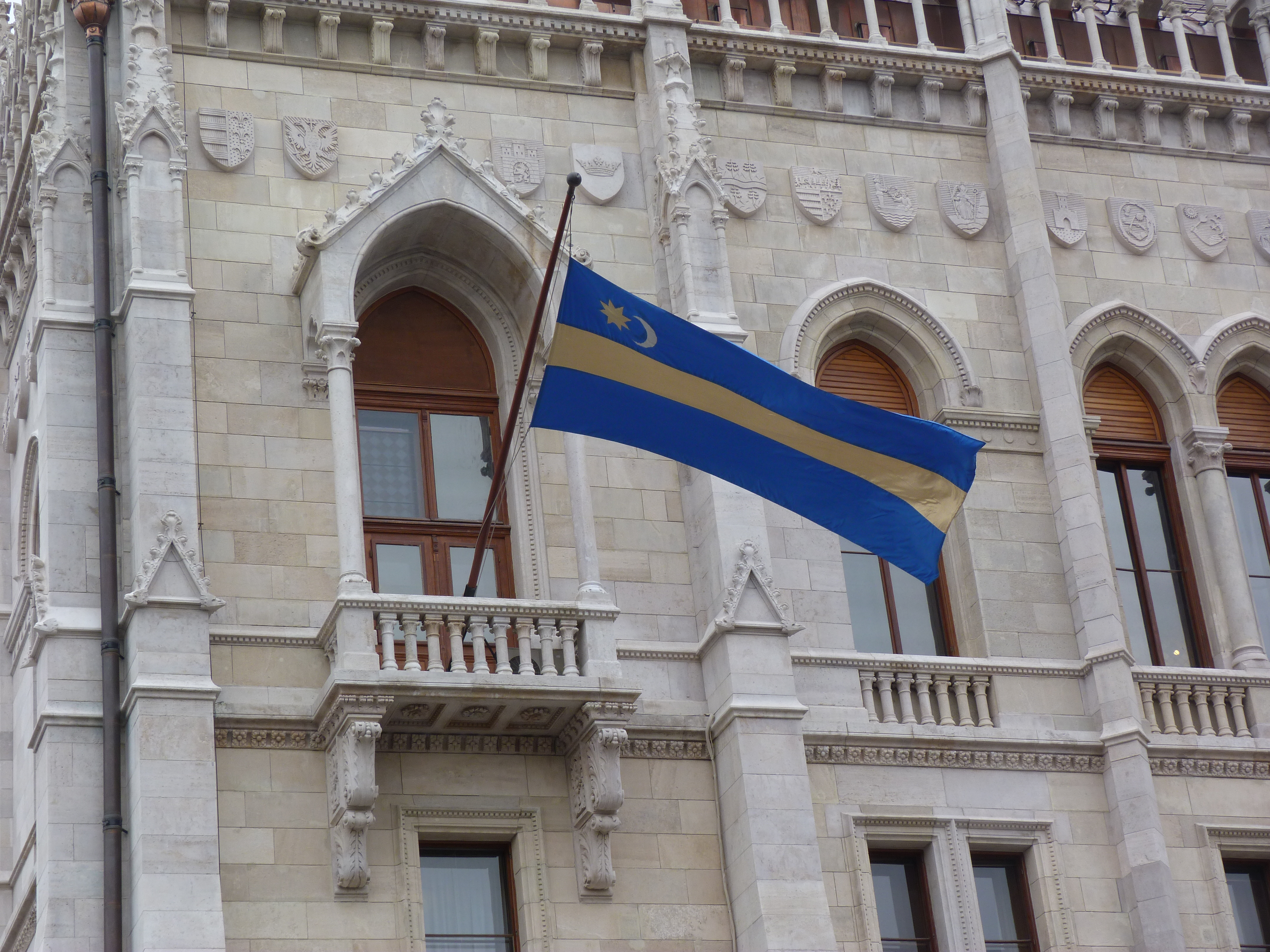
Székely flag flying above the Hungarian Parliament Building, Budapest

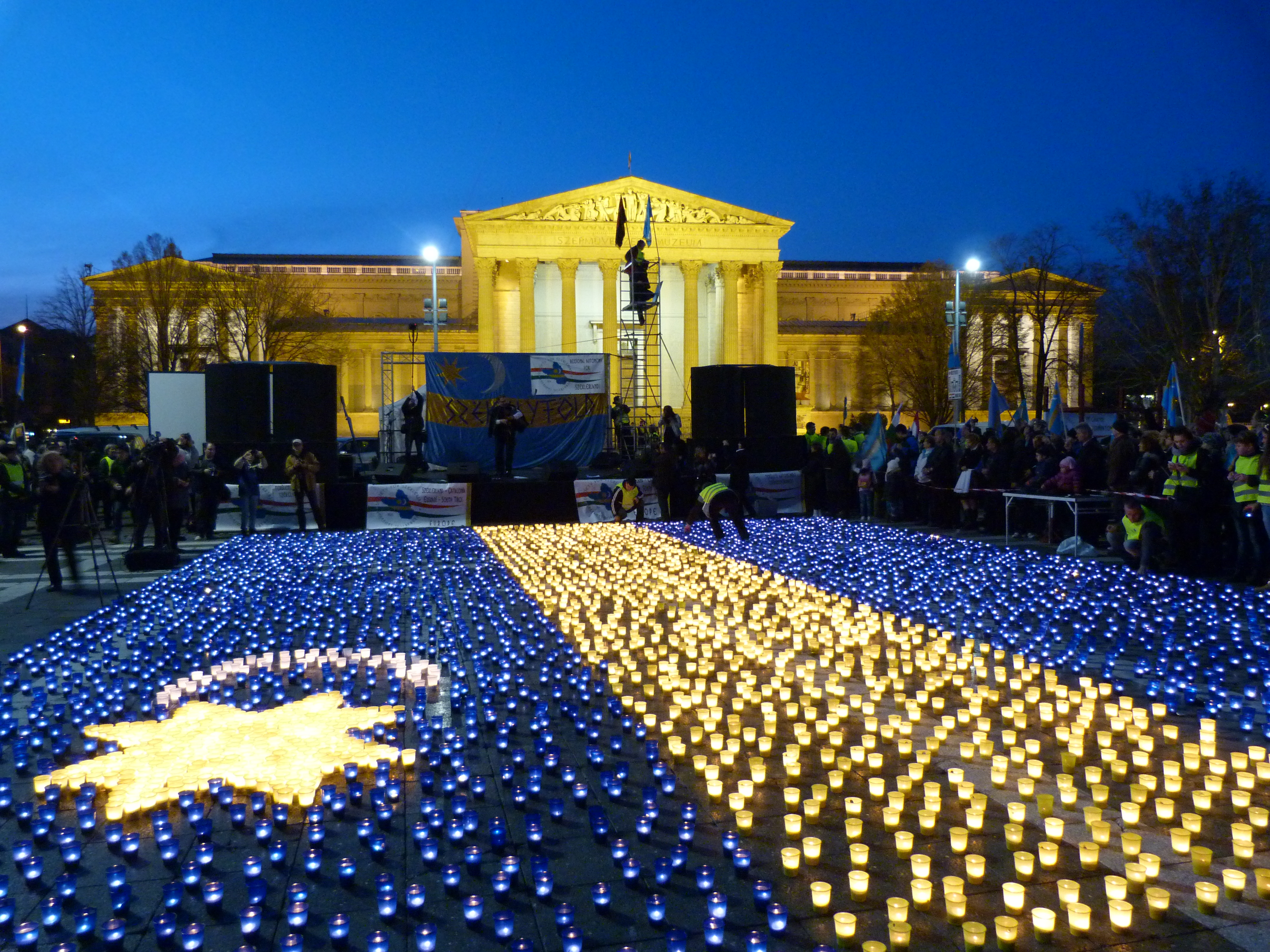
Demonstration in Budapest on the Székely Freedom Day

== See also ==
- Hungarians in Romania
- Magyar Autonomous Region
- Székely autonomy movement
- Csángó Land
- Partium
- Szekler National Council
- Székely himnusz
- Székely Land football team

== Notes ==
1."The Romanian hatred of Hungarians reminds us of the Croatian hatred of Serbs. Olteanu's method was to decapitate the men "by the use of axes" or impale them in front of their families" (Eric Markusen, David Kopf, The Holocaust and strategic bombing: genocide and total war in the twentieth century, Westview Press, 1995, p. 116)
