= Săcel, Harghita =

Săcel Székelyandrásfalva
- Commune
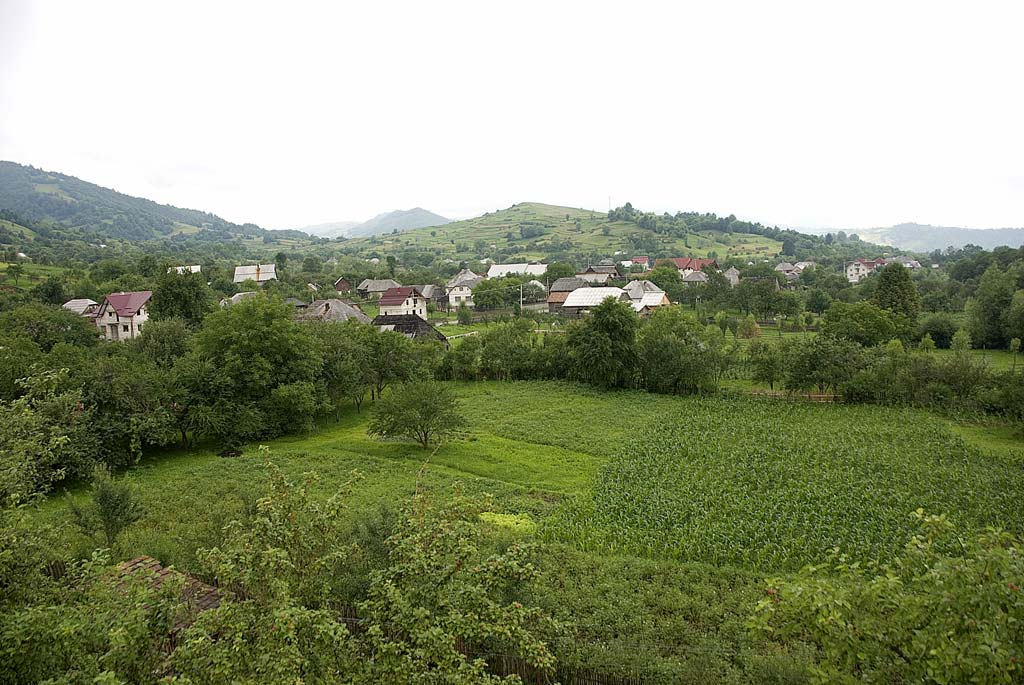

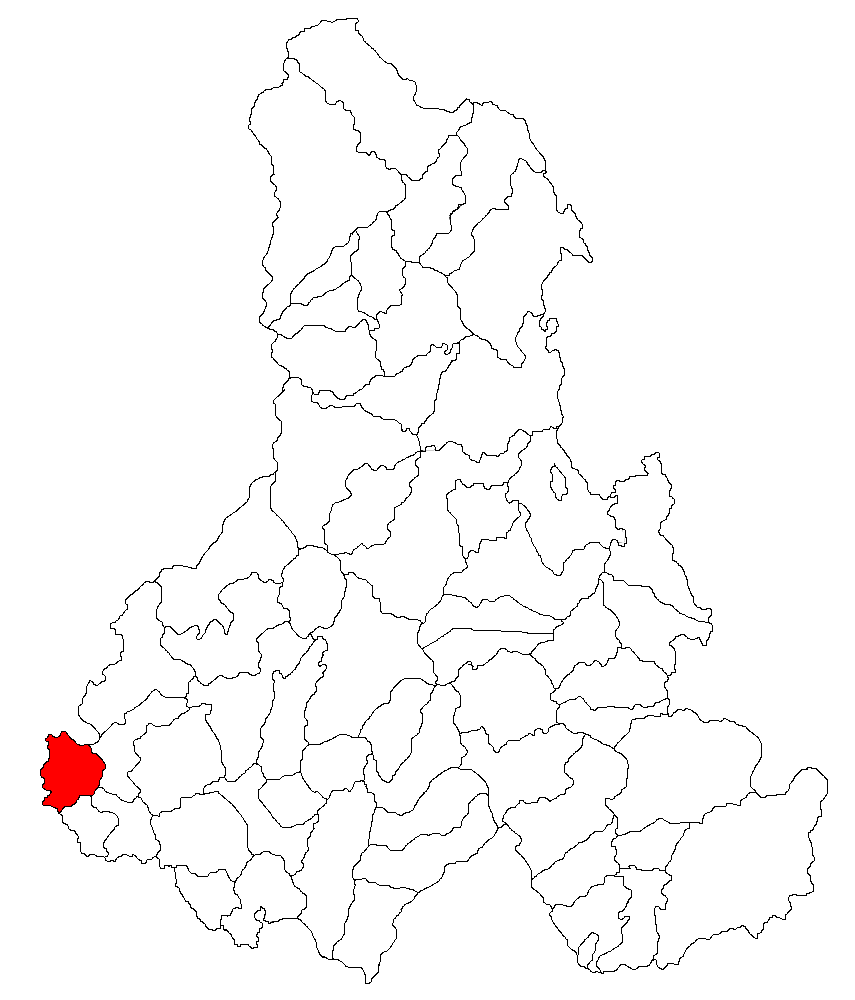
- Location in Harghita County

- Location in Romania
- Coordinates: 46°19′N 24°56′E
- Country: Romania
- County: Harghita

Government
  - Mayor (2024–2028): Lajos Nagy (UDMR)
- Area: 77.30 km^{2} (29.85 sq mi)
- Population (2021-12-01): 1,140
  - Density: 14.7/km^{2} (38.2/sq mi)
- Time zone: UTC+02:00 (EET)
  - Summer (DST): UTC+03:00 (EEST)
- Postal code: 537310
- Area code: +40 266
- Vehicle reg.: HR

Săcel (Hungarian: Székelyandrásfalva, Hungarian pronunciation: [ˈseːkɛjɒndraːʃfɒlvɒ]) is a commune in Harghita County, Romania. It lies in the Székely Land, an ethno-cultural region in eastern Transylvania.

The commune lies on the Transylvanian Plateau. It is located in the southwestern extremity of the county, on the border with Mureș County.

== Component villages ==
The commune is composed of five villages:

In Romanian	In Hungarian	Population^{(2002)}	Ethnic majority
Săcel	Székelyandrásfalva	144	Romanians
Șoimușu Mare	Nagysolymos	346	Hungarians
Șoimușu Mic	Kissolymos	451	Hungarians
Uilac	Újlak	27	Romanians
Vidăcut	Hidegkút	352	Mixed

== History ==
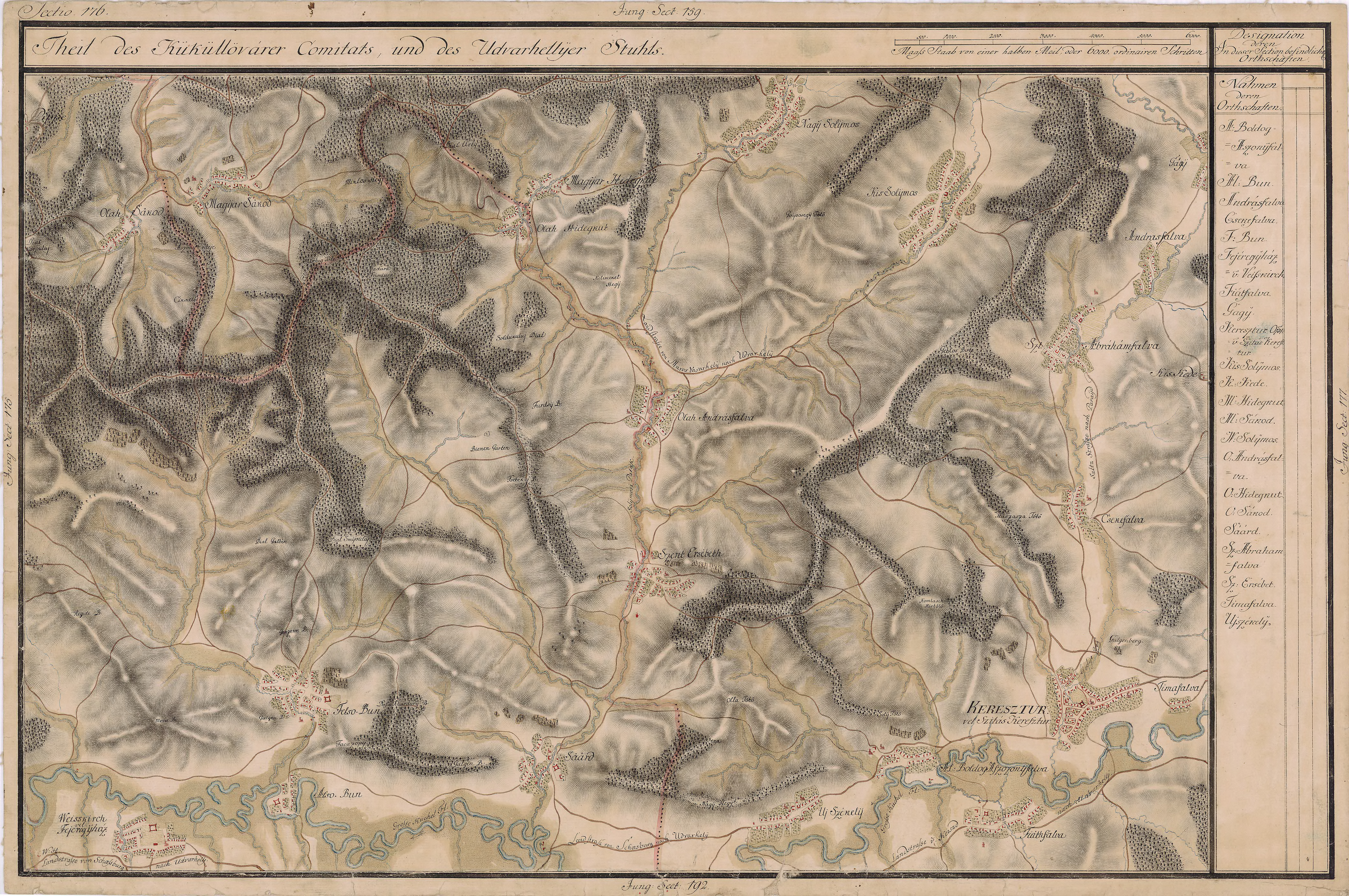
The villages on 18th century Josephinische Landesaufnahme

The villages were part of the Székely Land region of the historical Transylvania province. They belonged to Udvarhelyszék district until the administrative reform of Transylvania in 1876, when they fell within the Udvarhely County in the Kingdom of Hungary. After the Treaty of Trianon of 1920, they became part of Romania and fell within Odorhei County during the interwar period. In 1940, the second Vienna Award granted the Northern Transylvania to Hungary and the villages were held by Hungary until 1944. After Soviet occupation, the Romanian administration returned and the commune became officially part of Romania in 1947. Between 1952 and 1960, the commune fell within the Magyar Autonomous Region, between 1960 and 1968 the Mureș-Magyar Autonomous Region. In 1968, the province was abolished, and since then, the commune has been part of Harghita County.

== Demographics ==
At the 2011 census, the commune had a population of 1,253; out of them, 60% were Hungarian, 19% were Romanian and 18% were Roma. 67% had Hungarian as first language, 27% Romanian, and 2.6% Romani. 32% of the commune population are Orthodox, 31% are Unitarian and 28% are Reformed.

In the villages of Săcel (Székelyandrásfalva) and Uilac (Újlak) there is an absolute Romanian majority. As to Vidăcut (Hidegkút), in the hamlet Vidacutul Român (Székelyhidegkút) Romanians, while in Vidacutul Unguresc (Magyarhidegkút) Hungarians form the majority. Șoimușu Mic (Kissolymos) and Șoimușu Mare (Nagysolymos) have an absolute Hungarian majority.
