= Brazii =

- Commune
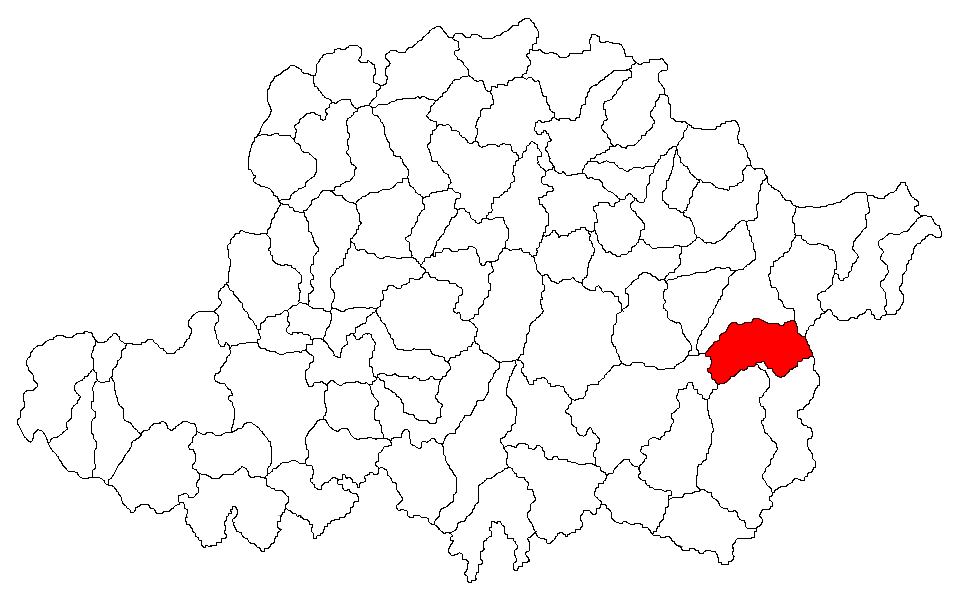
- Location in Arad County

- Location in Romania
- Coordinates: 46°14′N 22°20′E
- Country: Romania
- County: Arad
- Population (2021-12-01): 1,108
- Time zone: EET/EEST (UTC+2/+3)
- Vehicle reg.: AR

Brazii (Hungarian: Raj) is a commune in Arad County, Romania. It is situated in the southern part of the Gurahonț Basin, at the western foot of Măgura Ciungani Mountains and at the northern foot of Husu Massif, in the hydrographical basin of the Sighișoara River. It is composed of five villages: Brazii (situated at 111 km from Arad), Buceava-Șoimuș (Solymosbucsa), Iacobini (Zöldes), Mădrigești (Madarsák) and Secaș (Alsószakács).

== Population ==
According to the last census, the population of the commune counts 1417 inhabitants, out of which 99.2% are Romanians, 0.7% Roma and 0.1% are of other or undeclared nationalities.

== History ==
The first documentary record of the locality Brazii dates back to 1553. Buceava-Șoimuș, Secaș and Iacobini were mentioned in documents in 1439 and Mădrigești in 1441.

== Economy ==
Besides agriculture, the industry of building materials, timber and woodworking industry are present in great proportion in the commune's economy.

== Tourism ==
In addition to the mountainous landscapes, Brazii has cultural draws. Among these are the wooden church "Sfântul Mucenic Dimitrie" in Buceava-Șoimuș, being a historical and architectural monument from the 18th century, and the wooden church "Sfântul Mucenic Gheorghe" in Mădrigești.

== Twin towns ==
Brazii is twinned with:

- Lavelanet-de-Comminges, France
