= Șoimi =

- Commune
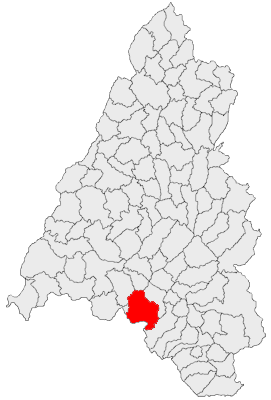
- Location in Bihor County

- Location in Romania
- Coordinates: 46°41′N 22°7′E
- Country: Romania
- County: Bihor
- Population (2021-12-01): 2,321
- Time zone: EET/EEST (UTC+2/+3)
- Vehicle reg.: BH

Șoimi (Hungarian: Sólyom) is a commune in Bihor County, Crișana, Romania, with a population of 2,543 people. It is composed of eight villages: Borz, Codru, Dumbrăvița de Codru (Havasdombró), Poclușa de Beiuș (Havaspoklos), Sânnicolau de Beiuș (Belényesszentmiklós), Șoimi, Ursad (Urszád) and Urviș de Beiuș (Belényesörvényes).
