= Civic Forum of the Romanians of Covasna, Harghita and Mureș =

Ethnic Romanian organization in Transylvania

The Civic Forum of the Romanians of Covasna, Harghita and Mureș (Romanian: Forumul Civic al Românilor din Covasna, Harghita și Mureș, FCRCHM) is a forum grouping some 45 organizations of Covasna, Harghita and Mureș counties in Romania as of 2022. These counties have a large ethnically Hungarian population made up of the Székely subgroup, although ethnic Romanians also live in them. The FCRCHM was founded on 4 June 2005 and aims to organize the ethnic Romanian population in these counties to prevent its disappearance; for this purpose, it has organized various events and initiatives.

The FCRCHM opposes the Székely autonomy movement and sees the adoption of national symbols by the Székely minority as proof of a closed and separatist attitude by the Hungarians. It has also become involved in controversies after suing the Government of Romania for the approval of a flag for Covasna County and for the city of Sfântu Gheorghe with Székely symbolry and without any type of representation for their Romanian population within the flags. The forum has been accused of being a Romanian nationalist and anti-Hungarian organization by Hungarian-language media.

== History ==
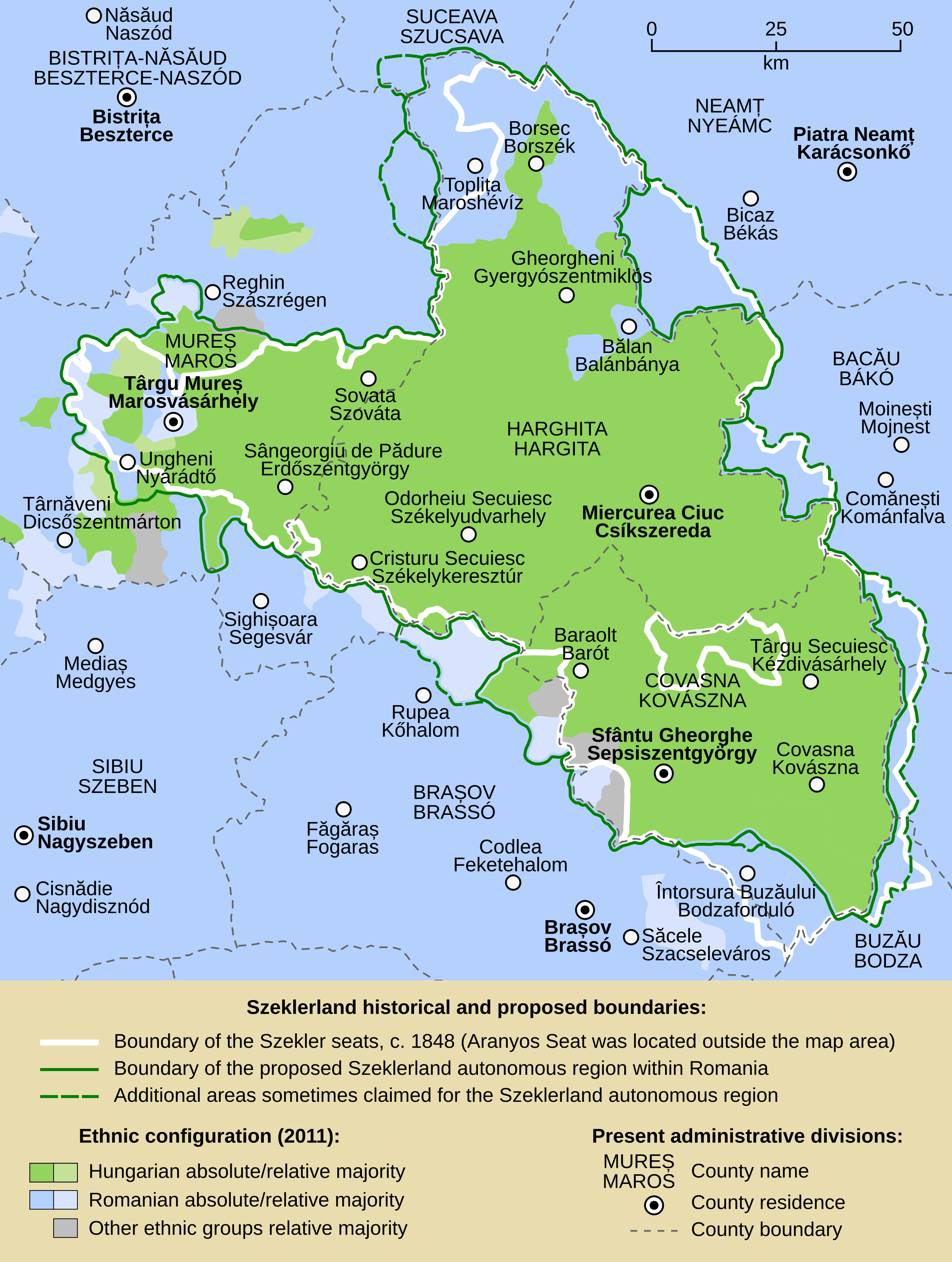
Map of Székely Land including the region's traditional borders in white, within which there are several Romanian-majority localities. The FCRCHM claims to support the Romanians of Székely Land.

The FCRCHM was founded on 4 June 2005 in Miercurea Ciuc at the Eparchial Center of the Diocese of Covasna and Harghita of the Romanian Orthodox Church. It encompassed at the time 12 organizations of the counties of Covasna and Harghita and was known as the Civic Forum of the Romanians of Harghita and Covasna (Romanian: Forumul Civic al Românilor din Covasna și Harghita, FCRCH). The event had the participation of Ioan Selejan, the diocese's bishop, who was declared honorary president and said that the establishment of such an organization was necessary. Covasna and Harghita counties, as well as Mureș County, are home to the Székelys, an ethnic subgroup of the Hungarians of around 600,000 people who form the majority, though not the only population, in the set of these three counties, often referred to as Székely Land. The Székelys have sought autonomy within Romania, but this has always been met with strong opposition within the country.

The forum claims that its objective is to coordinate Romanian civil society in these counties in order to preserve Romanian identity in the area and ensure a successful interethnic coexistence with other local communities. The FCRCHM opposes the Székely autonomy movement, which it argues is aimed at the oppression and assimilation of the local Romanians. As of 2022, the FCRCHM comprised some 45 organizations from the three counties. Hungarian journalists and Hungarian-language media have accused the forum of being Romanian nationalist and engaging into anti-Hungarian rhetoric. As of 2014, the FCRCHM included some 25 organizations from Covasna and Harghita but also from Mureș counties; by this point it was already known as the Civic Forum of the Romanians of Covasna, Harghita and Mureș (Romanian: Forumul Civic al Românilor din Covasna, Harghita și Mureș, FCRCHM).

In a 2010 memorandum, the forum declared that the ethnic Romanians at Covasna, Harghita and Mureș counties were "fighting" for the survival of their identity. The memorandum added that the Hungarian community "is turning into a closed ethnic mass, stuck between its own obsessively segregationist mental boundaries"; the adoption of an anthem, coat of arms and flag of their own would be evidence of this according to the memorandum. It made an appeal to state authorities, national institutions and to Romanian society in general to take steps for the adoption of legislative measures that would ensure the situation of ethnic Romanians in these counties. This memorandum was adopted during a meeting in Toplița which counted with the participation of the then president of the Social Democratic Party (PSD), Victor Ponta, who expressed his opposition for Székely autonomy.

On 10 July 2018, during the Centenary March, members of the FCRCHM among several other organizations received the participants of the march at Târgu Mureș.

On 14 March 2021, the FCRCHM organized a meeting under the motto Români pentru români ("Romanians for Romanians") at the Museum of Romanian Spirituality at the St. Nicholas and Great Martyr St. George Orthodox Cathedral at Sfântu Gheorghe in which there was a debate discussing the situation of the Romanian community in the three counties and in which the Pr. Prof. Dr. Ilie Moldovan Prizes were delivered. The FCRCHM gives these awards annually to all those who support the activity of Romanian Orthodox churches, Romanian-language schools and Romanian cultural institutions in the three counties; to those researchers distinguished for their research works on the Romanian communities on the Carpathians, their situation and their coexistence and interethnic relations with the local ethnic Hungarians; to those who support the organization of Romanian cultural and scientific events in the three counties; and to the leaders of organizations aimed at improving Romanian community life in them.

In late 2021, after the officialization by the Government of Romania of flags for Covasna County and for Sfântu Gheorghe, the FCRCHM announced it would start a lawsuit against the government for this decision. This would because both symbols do not include any type of representation for the Romanian population of both places and because of the use of colors similar to those of the flag of the Székelys.

In 2022, the FCRCHM requested some land to the town hall of Sfântu Gheorghe for the placement of a bust of the Romanian poet Mihai Eminescu after it was announced by local authorities that a statue of the Hungarian poet Sándor Petőfi would be erected in the city. The mayor of the municipality, Árpád András Antal, said that he had no problem with this but that he would only sit down to discuss the proposal if the FCRCHM withdrew the lawsuit it had started regarding Sfântu Gheorghe's flag; due to this request, the FCRCHM accused Árpád of blackmail and of anti-Romanian discrimination.

== See also ==
- Hungarians in Romania
- Hungary–Romania relations
- Magyarization
- Romanianization
