= Coat of arms of the Székelys =

Ethnic coat of arms

- Armiger: Civic
- Adopted: 17 January 2004; 21 years ago
- Shield: An azure field with a golden "sun-star" and a silver crescent moon

The coat of arms of the Székelys (Hungarian: Székely címer; Romanian: Stema secuilor) is the coat of arms used by the Hungarian Székely community of Romania. It is a blue coat of arms with a golden eight-pointed "sun-star" and a silver crescent moon, both perceived as ancient Székely symbols. Being designed by Ádám Kónya, the Szekler National Council adopted it in 2004 and is since then a symbol for the Székely people.

It is argued that the symbols of the coat of arms are traditional symbols of the Székelys. The crescent moon and sun have been used since at least the 15th century in Transylvania. However, the use of a "sun-star" as Kónya has defined it is controversial as it does not comply with heraldic rules.

== Design ==
The coat of arms of the Székelys was designed by Ádám Kónya and officially adopted in 2004. It consists of a blue background with an eight-pointed star and a crescent moon. According to Kónya, the eight-pointed "sun-star" symbolizes the eight historical Székely seats (Bardóc-Miklósvárszék, Csíkszék, Gyergyószék, Kézdiszék, Marosszék, Orbaiszék, Sepsiszék and Udvarhelyszék).

The crescent moon and the sun were already considered Székely symbols as early as in the 16th century. In fact, in 1580, they appeared as components of the coat of arms of the Principality of Transylvania and the Transylvanian Diet adopted them as official Székely symbols in 1659. Subsequently, the crescent moon and the sun started to appear on flags and coats of arms of the Székely seats.

Experts have criticized that the sun represented in the Székely coat of arms and flag does not comply with heraldic rules, not being a heraldic sun but in fact not even a star either, but rather a reminiscence of the Székely woven fabric patterns.

== History ==
Flag based on a 15th-century Székely coat of arms

One of the first symbols of the Székelys is a 15th-century coat of arms consisting on an armored arm holding a sword on a red background; the sword pierces a golden crown, a heart and the head of a bear, with on either side of the latter being a rising moon and a six-pointed star. This possibly influenced other Székely military flags of the time, popularizing these colors and symbols as well.

However, allegedly, the modern coat of arms with the sun and the crescent moon was given to the Székelys by the Holy Roman Emperor Sigismund in 1437 as a reward for their loyalty and military labors.

In 2003, the Szekler National Council was established. It adopted the Székely coat of arms and flag by Kónya, based on old Székely emblems, as its own symbols.

Posteriorly, as this council is the main advocate of the Székely autonomy movement, these symbols soon became expressions of Székely cohesion, cooperation and self-identity. While the popularity of the coat of arms started gradually increasing, the press and people began to refer to it as the "Székely coat of arms". On 5 September 2009, a Székely organization declared the symbols as the coat of arms and flag of Székely Land.

== See also ==
- Flag of the Székelys
- Székely himnusz
- Coat of arms of Hungary
