= Flag of the Székelys =

Ethnic flag

- Use: Civil
- Proportion: 2:3
- Adopted: 17 January 2004; 22 years ago
- Design: Azure rectangular flag with a golden horizontal band on its middle and a golden "sun-star" and a silver crescent moon at its upper left corner
- Designed by: Ádám Kónya

The flag of the Székelys (Hungarian: Székely zászló; Romanian: Drapelul secuilor) is the flag used by the ethnically Hungarian Székely community of Romania. It is a blue flag with a golden strip and a "sun-star" and crescent moon, both perceived as ancient Székely symbols. Being designed by Ádám Kónya, the Szekler National Council adopted it in 2004 and has since been a symbol for the Székely people. The Romanian authorities have imposed some restrictions on the conditions under which the flag can be displayed, which has allegedly fostered its popularity.

It is argued that both the symbols of the flag and its colors are traditional symbols of the Székelys. Regarding the latter, there is no fixed evidence, but the crescent moon and sun have been used since at least the 15th century in Transylvania. However, the use of a "sun-star" as Kónya has defined it is controversial as it does not comply with heraldic rules. Apart from the blue and golden one, there is another unofficial version of the Székely flag, a red and black one used by some Székely groups and organizations.

== Design ==
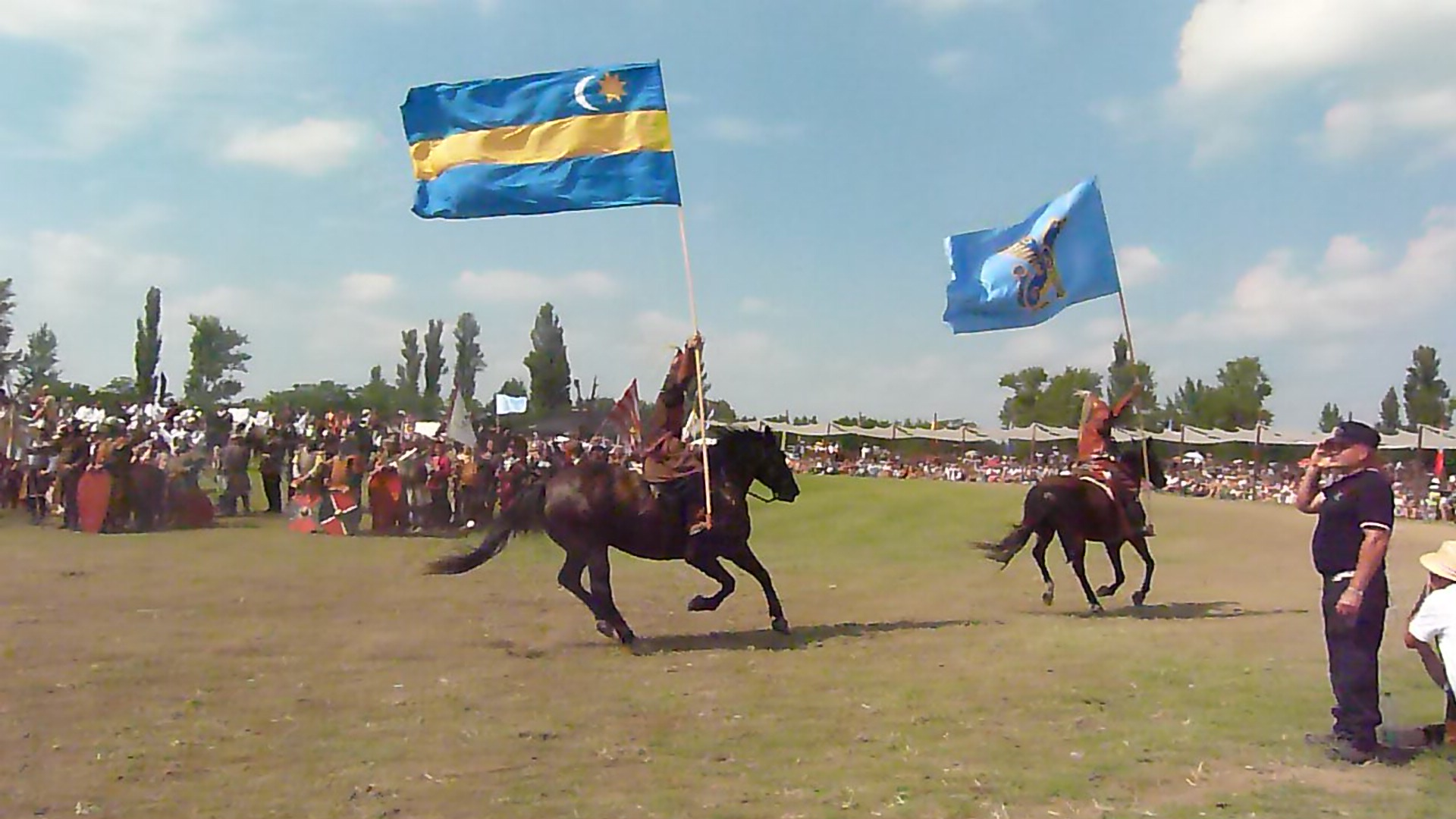
The Székely flag being flown at the Great Kurultáj of 2014 in Bugac, Hungary

The flag of the Székelys was designed by Ádám Kónya and was officially adopted in 2004. It is a blue rectangular flag with a ratio of 2:3. The azure (blue) background is cut by a horizontal golden bar in a 2:1:2 ratio. On the side of the flagpole within the upper blue bar is an eight-pointed golden star and a silver crescent moon.

According to Kónya's original description of the flag, the eight-pointed "sun-star" symbolizes the eight historical Székely seats (Bardóc-Miklósvárszék, Csíkszék, Gyergyószék, Kézdiszék, Marosszék, Orbaiszék, Sepsiszék and Udvarhelyszék). The crescent moon and the sun were already considered Székely symbols as early as the 16th century. In fact, in 1580, they appeared as components of the coat of arms of the Principality of Transylvania and the Transylvanian Diet adopted them as official Székely symbols in 1659. Subsequently, the crescent moon and the sun started to appear on flags and coats of arms of the Székely seats.

It has been claimed that the colors of the flag, blue and golden, were used in military flags of the Prince of Transylvania Moses Székely and that the blue and golden colors used in the coat of arms of the Maros-Torda County are proof of the colors' antiquity as Székely symbols, but this is not confirmed. Also, Moses Székely's flag was not blue and golden, but blue and white.

Experts have also criticized that the sun represented in the Székely flag does not comply with heraldic rules, not being a heraldic sun but in fact not even a star either, but rather a reminiscence of the Székely woven fabric patterns.

=== Red-black version ===
Red-and-black version of the Székely flag

There also is another unofficial version of the Székely flag known by some people as the "old" or "battle flag" of the Székelys. In reality, this version has no historical precedent, as it was created in the second half of the 20th century in the area of Csíkszék using the basic colors of the typical Székely female folk costume as a "revolt" against the Romanian authorities. Today, it is mainly used by the people of Csíkszék, with some mistakenly considering it an old, traditional Székely flag.

The black-and-red version is used by the Székely's World Alliance, registered in the United States; and it is also preferred by motorcyclists and rockers.

== History ==
=== First Székely symbols and military flags ===
Székely flag used at the Battle of Guruslău

One of the oldest Székely symbols is a 15th-century coat of arms consisting on an armored arm holding a sword on a red background; the sword pierces a golden crown, a heart and the head of a bear, the latter being surrounded by a rising moon and a six-pointed golden star. The other Székely military flags of the time probably also carried these colors and symbols as well.

Possibly, today's official flag can be traced back to the times of the Transylvanian prince Moses Székely. His military flags led the Székely soldiers in the Battle of Guruslău on 3 August 1601, but after their defeat, the flags were captured and sent to the then Habsburg-ruled city of Prague. The Transylvanian flags that were captured were published in a study from 1893 by Sándor Mika named Erdélyi hadizászlók 1601-ből ("Transylvanian war flags from 1601").

Before the 21st century, there was not any uniform flag for the Székelys. Until 1876, each Székely seat used its own symbols as an independent political unit, and then up to the Treaty of Trianon, the Hungarian state symbols. In modern times, the ethnic Hungarians in Romania started using the Hungarian flag, placing it on buildings. However, a Romanian law passed in 1994 and supplemented in 2001 prohibited the display of the flag of "foreign states", including Hungary, on unofficial occasions, making it impossible to use the Hungarian flag.

=== Modern flag ===
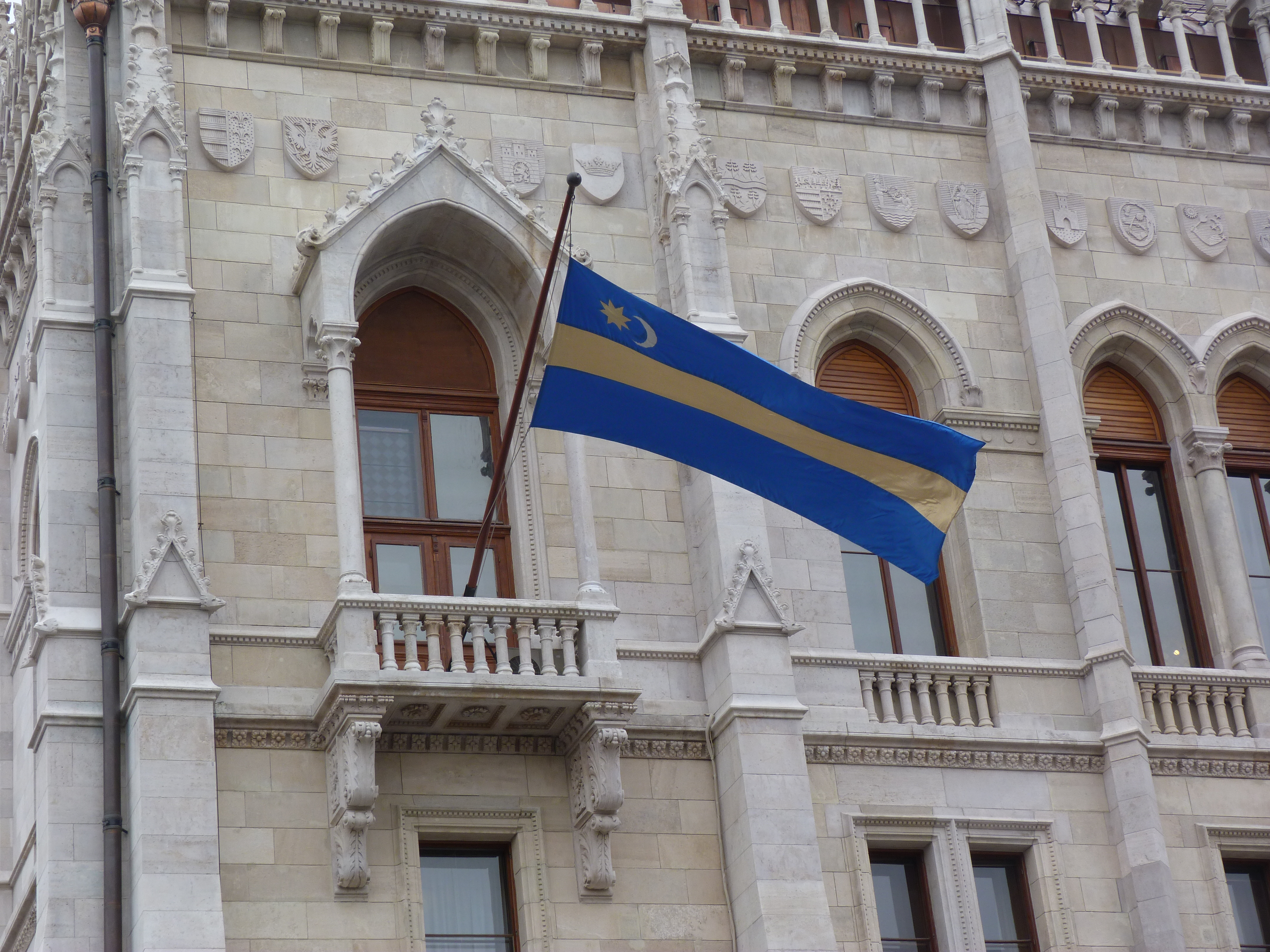
Székely flag flying on the Hungarian Parliament Building in Budapest

In 2003, the Szekler National Council was established. It adopted the blue and golden Székely flag and coat of arms by Ádám Kónya, based on old Székely emblems, as its own symbols.

As this council is the main advocate of the Székely autonomy movement, these symbols soon became expressions of Székely cohesion, cooperation and self-identity. While the popularity of the flag started gradually increasing, the press and people began to refer to it as the "Székely flag". On 5 September 2009, a Székely organization declared the symbols as the flag and coat of arms of Székely Land. It has been claimed that the Romanians can not relate the Székely claims for autonomy with Hungarian irredentist ideas through the use of the Székely flag since not even a single Hungarian state symbol is on it.

On the following years, the Székely flag would start to appear on several public buildings and also on Székely populated places such as Ciumani (Gyergyócsomafalva) in 2005, in Sfântu Gheorghe (Sepsiszentgyörgy) in 2009, and other ones posteriorly. The Romanian authorities responded to this with numerous final judgments issued since 2013, according to which the Székely symbols must be removed from all public buildings and spaces, including their interior. To strengthen this, a new law was adopted in 2015, which further restricted the use of Székely flags.

According to Hungarian Romanian heraldist Attila István Szekeres, the popularity and significance of the Székely flag can be attributed in part due to the persecution and campaign against it of the Romanian authorities. According to Hungarian journalist Levente Balogh, "if they did not start a campaign against it, not many people apart from its inventor would be interested in it. In this way, however, it has also been burned into the minds of those who have little to do with the Székelys anyway, and today it is seen everywhere as a minority symbol persecuted by chauvinist authorities".

It is also used in some places of Hungary. In fact, it started to be hoisted on the Hungarian Parliament Building in Budapest on 15 February 2013, as well as on several municipal buildings in the country.

== The ban on Hungarian and Székely flags in Romania ==
Since the early 1990s and especially after 2000, Romanian authorities have repeatedly ordered local councils, mayor's offices and other public institutions in Hungarian-majority areas to remove Hungarian and Székely flags from public buildings and flagpoles. For example, in Civic Association for Dignity in Europe (ADEC), founded by the known Romanian right wing politician Dan Tanasă-led cases local courts ordered the removal of Hungarian flags from the city-hall in Székelyudvarhely/Odorheiu Secuiesc in 2021. In one case the Covasna County Council building flew US, Israeli, German, Hungarian and Székely flags, yet the court ordered only the Hungarian and Székely flags to be removed — leaving the other national flags intact; critics argue this demonstrates discriminatory treatment of the Hungarian community and its national symbols. According to Romanian state commentary, the region called “Székely Land” is not an administrative unit and hence the flag has no legal basis for display on public buildings, a position used to justify such removals. In sport, the Romanian Football Federation warned and fined the club FK Csíkszereda in 2025 for use of Hungarian and Székely flags and symbols at a match, citing ethnic sensitivity and violation of disciplinary rules. While Romanian law (Law 75/1994 and later 141/2015) regulates the Romanian national flag and the flags of counties/municipalities, it is ambiguous or silent on the flags of traditional regions or national minorities — critics say this ambiguity is used to suppress Hungarian/Székely symbols while allowing other foreign national flags freely, hence reflecting a double standard. The mentioned Romanian law only prohibits the use of other countries' flags, but the Székely flag is not the flag of any other country, so Romanian law does not apply to it. Nevertheless, Romanian authorities refer to this law when they order the Székely flags to be removed. In contrast, there are no known similar enforcement actions in Hungary against Romanian flags displayed in Hungarian municipalities or public buildings, illustrating the asymmetry in how minority versus majority symbols are treated in these countries.

The Székely flag was torn down from the Turul statue from Sâncrăieni (Csíkszentkirály) by supporters of a Bucharest football team in April 2025; described as a violent anti-Hungarian act.

== See also ==
- Coat of arms of the Székelys
- Székely himnusz
- Flag of Hungary
