= Szekler National Council =

Romanian political organization

- Székely Nemzeti Tanács (Hungarian); Consiliul Național Secuiesc (Romanian)
- Coat of arms
- Type: NGO
- Headquarters: Sfântu Gheorghe (Sepsiszentgyörgy)
- Region served: Székely Land
- Leader: Balázs Izsák
- Website: https://www.sznt.org/en/

The Szekler National Council (Hungarian: Székely Nemzeti Tanács, [ˈseːkɛj ˈnɛmzɛti ˈtɒnaːt͡ʃ] SZNT; Romanian: Consiliul Național Secuiesc, CNS) is a NGO civic organization representing the Székelys of Romania. The organisation serves as a platform to promote Szekler autonomy.

== History ==
The Council was founded on October 16, 2003. Its first president was József Csapó, who served until late 2006, when he resigned. Until the Council held a new presidential election in February 2008, in which Balázs Izsák emerged victorious, the president ad interim had been Imre Fodor, the former mayor of Târgu Mureş.

== Doctrine ==
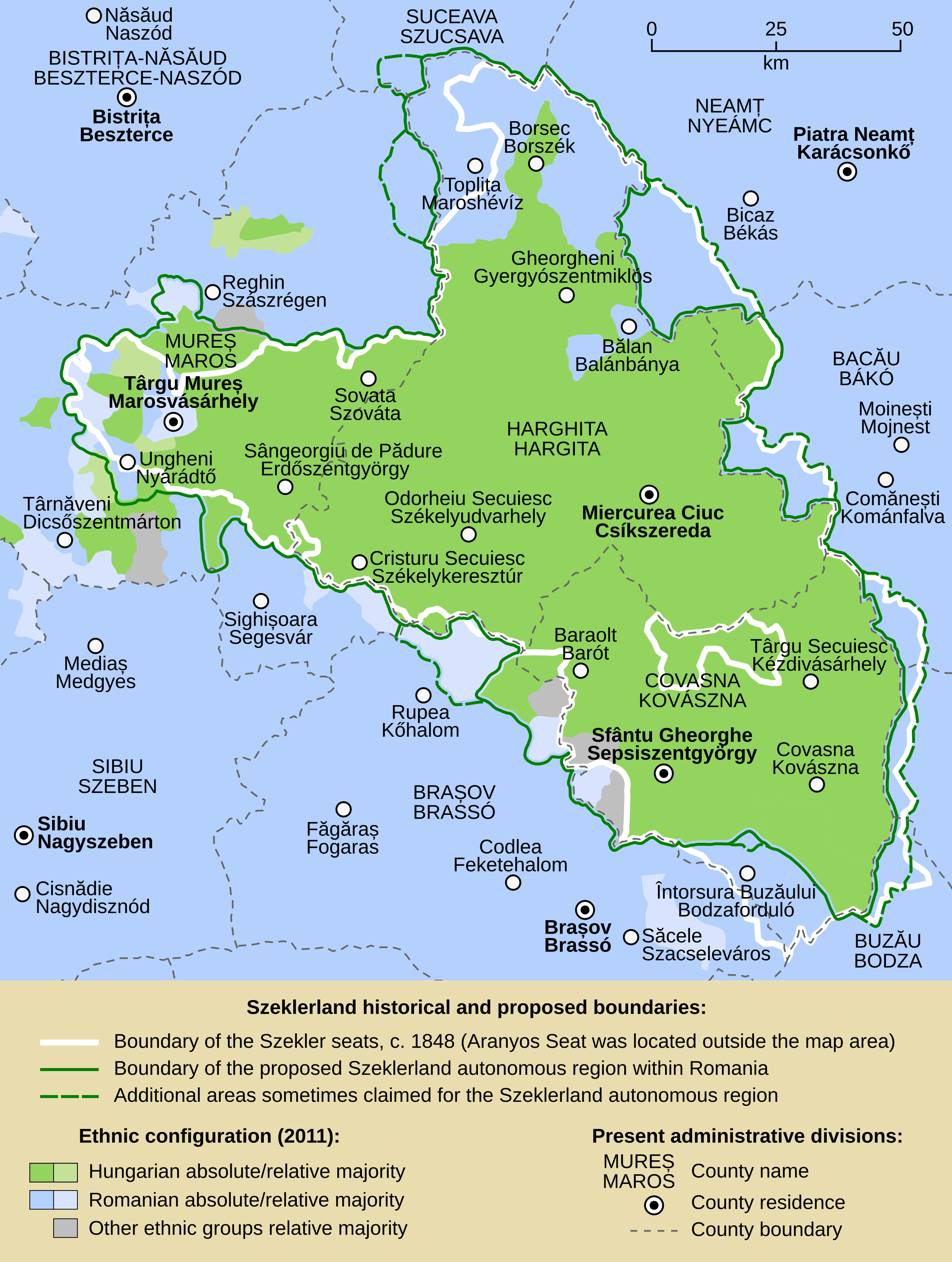
Szekely Land as envisaged by the Szekler National Council

Flag of the Szekler National Council

The Council wants to obtain self-government for the Székely Land, a historic region in Transylvania. It looks to the historical fact that the Székely Seats were the traditional self-governing territorial units of the Transylvanian Székelys during medieval times. (Saxons were also organised in Seats.) The Seats were not part of the traditional Hungarian county system, and their inhabitants enjoyed a higher level of freedom (especially until the 18th century) than those living in the counties. Their autonomy was granted in return for the military services they provided to the Hungarian Kings.

The Council also claims the rights of Székelys to self-determination, as guaranteed by the Treaty of Trianon. Officially, the treaty was intended to be a confirmation of the concept of the right for self-determination of nations.

The SZNC hopes to obtain self-determination for the Székely Land on the Catalan model.

== Structure ==
Presidents of Székely Seats and the members of the Standing Committee (SC):

=== Presidents of Seats ===
- Marosszék: Imre Fodor
- Udvarhelyszék: Béla Incze
- Csíkszék: Csaba Ferencz
- Gyergyószék: Károly Czirják
- Bardoc-Miklósvárszék: Miklós Szabó
- Sepsiszék: Barna Benedek
- Orbaiszék: Botond Ferencz
- Kézdiszék: László Bakk

=== Members of SC ===
- President: Balázs Izsák
- Vice presidents: Emőke Benkő, Géza Borsos, Csaba Ferencz, Imre Fodor, József Gazda, Ádám Kónya, Jenő Szász, Attila Tulit, Csaba Farkas, Imre Fazakas
- Rapporteurs: Pál Nagy, Árpád Andrássy, Lajos Dancs, Aladár Bod, Dávid Veress, Imre András

The Szekler National Council has 156 members and is a member of the Hungarian National Council of Transylvania. To guarantee the representation of every Székely settlement, every settlement which has under 1500 Székely inhabitants can nominate one deputy. The Székely settlements which have over 1500 Székely inhabitants can nominate one deputy for every 3000 Székely inhabitants.

== .sic ==
.sic was a proposed top-level domain for the Domain Name System of the Internet. It is as an abbreviation of Siculitas (Székely), and was requested in 2009 by an initiative of the Council for presenting Szeklerland on the Internet. The application was accepted by ICANN on May 13, 2009. This procedure, however, was not completed because of a lack of funds, and the Szekler National Council subsequently registered the sic.hu domain-name. This domain was eventually abandoned in turn by the Szekler National Council, but is still in use by other organizations.

== See also ==
- Székely autonomy movement
- Székely Land
- List of Székely settlements
