= Székely Freedom Day =

Holiday held to protest for the Székely autonomy initiative

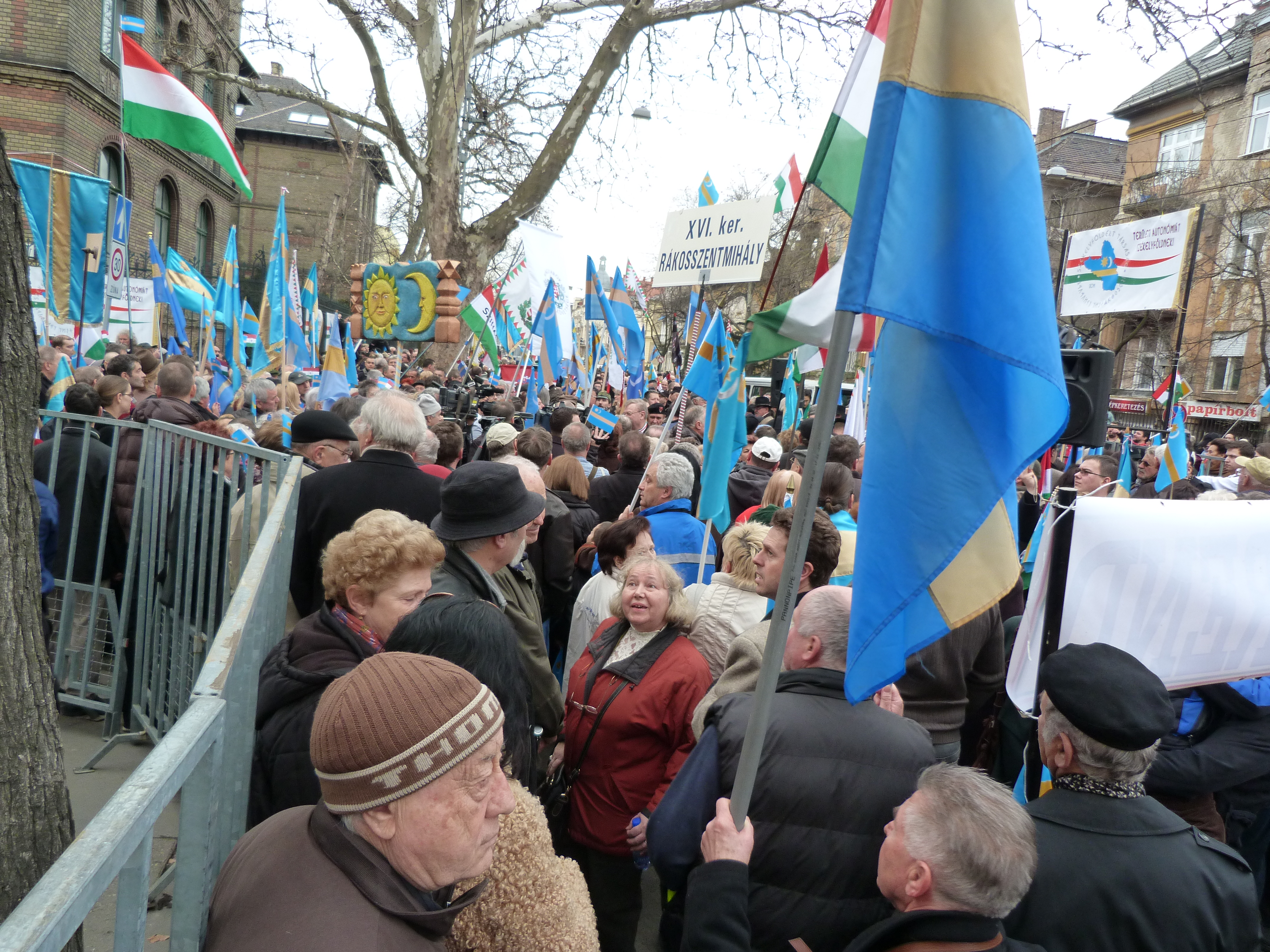
- Protesters in Budapest (Hungary) calling for Székely autonomy on the Székely Freedom Day
- Observed by: Székelys
- Type: Local
- Significance: Commemoration of the execution of three Székely revolutionaries in 1854
- Celebrations: Protests for the Székely autonomy movement
- Date: 10 March
- Next time: 10 March 2026
- Frequency: Annual

The Székely Freedom Day (Hungarian: Székely Szabadság Napja, [ˈseːkɛj ˈsɒbɒt͡ʃːaːɡ ˈnɒpjɒ]; Romanian: Ziua Libertății Secuilor) is a day celebrated by the Székely Hungarian minority of Romania. It is celebrated every 10 March in Târgu Mureș, but also in other parts of Székely Land and internationally. The holiday was created according to a decision of the Szekler National Council on 6 January 2012.

The same council said that this day (10 March) was chosen to commemorate the execution of Mihály Gálffy, Károly Horváth and János Török in 1854 at Târgu Mureș. They were Székely revolutionaries who, after the defeat in 1848, reorganized in Bucharest but were later caught and executed by the Austrian Empire's authorities.

There have been complaints as, on this day, there are often protests for the autonomy of the Székelys, which have caused conflicts between the protesters and the Romanian authorities. In addition, the holiday has been attended earlier as well by Hungarian far-right parties and groups such as Jobbik and the Sixty-Four Counties Youth Movement. Protests for the autonomy of the Székelys have also occurred in Hungary as a sign of support.

In 2020, due to the COVID-19 pandemic, events related to the Székely Freedom Day suffered restrictions. The same year, a collection of signatures that were to be sent to the European Citizens' Initiative was carried out. This was done mainly with the intention that the European Union (EU) would provide support to the Hungarian regional communities in Romania.

== See also ==
- Public holidays in Romania
- Székely Autonomy Day
- Hungarians in Romania
