= Székely Autonomy Day =

Holiday celebrated to protest for the establishment of a Székely autonomy in Romania

- Observed by: Romania (Hungarian minority)
- Type: Local
- Celebrations: Fires are lit on Székely-inhabited places
- Date: Every last Sunday of October
- 2024 date: 27 October 2024
- Frequency: Annual

The Székely Autonomy Day (Hungarian: Székely Autonómia Napja; Romanian: Ziua Autonomiei Ținutului Secuiesc) is a day celebrated by the Székely (Hungarian) minority of Romania. It is celebrated every last Sunday of October. On it, candles, torches and fires are lit on Székely cities, villages and settlements to demand the autonomy of Székely Land within Romania.

The Székely Autonomy Day was first celebrated on 2015. The next year, the Szekler National Council announced that the day would be celebrated on every last Sunday of October. The holiday has also been celebrated in Hungary.

== See also ==
- Public holidays in Romania
- Székely Freedom Day
- Hungarians in Romania
