= Székely autonomy movement =

Political movement in the Székely region of Romania

Flag and coat of arms of the Székelys

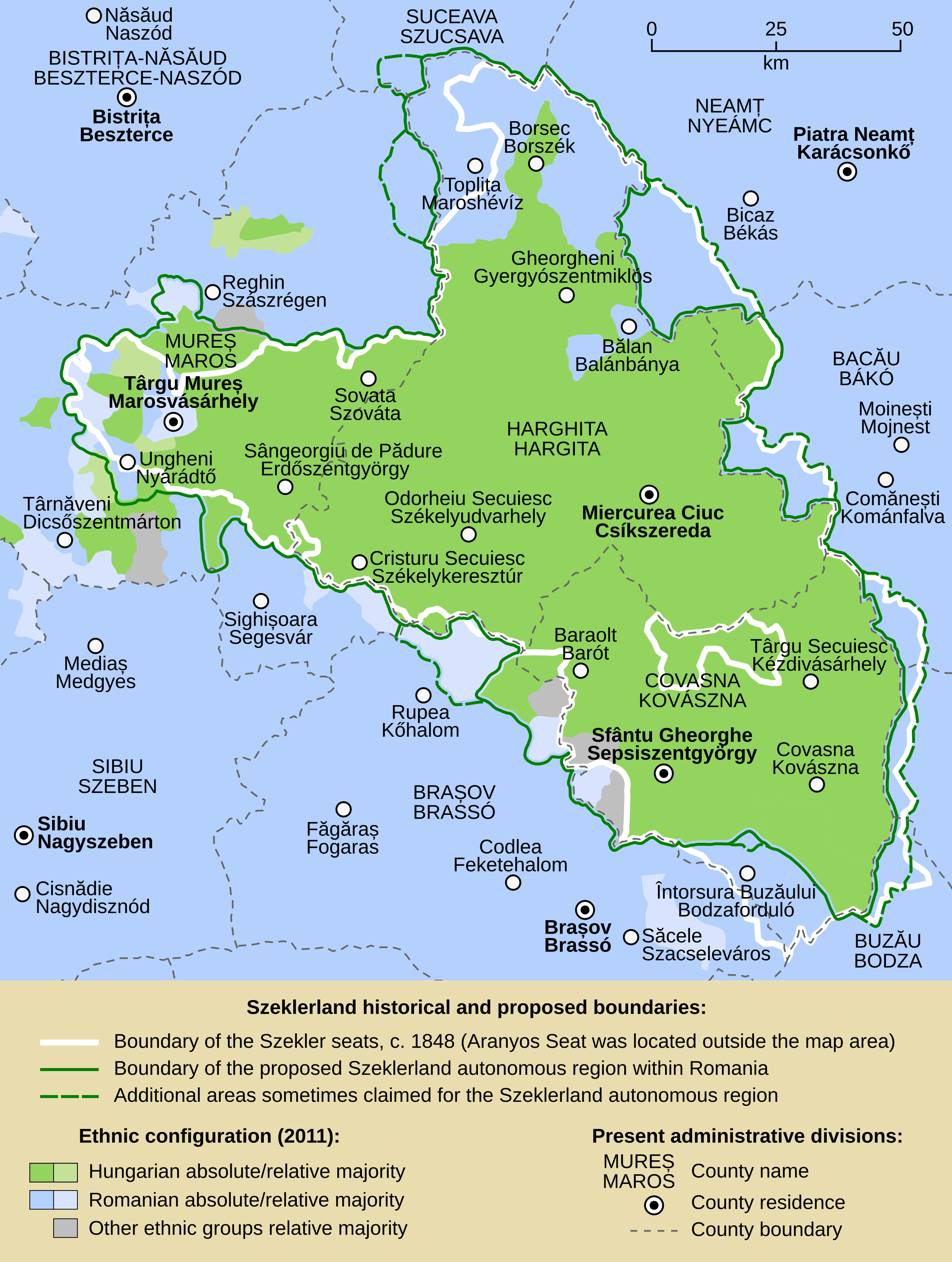
Székely Land as envisaged by the autonomy supporters

The Székely Land (Szeklerland) is a historic and ethnographic region in Eastern Transylvania, in the center of Romania. The primary goal for the Hungarian political organisations in Romania is to achieve Székely autonomy. The Szeklers make up about half of the Hungarians in Romania and live in a compact ethnic bloc. According to official data from Romania's 2011 census, 609,033 persons in Mureș, Harghita, and Covasna counties consider themselves Hungarian (56.8% of total population of the three counties). The Székelys (Szeklers), a Hungarian sub-group, are mainly concentrated in these three counties.

== Political organizations ==
The most important political organisation of ethnic Hungarians in Romania is the Democratic Alliance of Hungarians in Romania, which undertakes to represent all Hungarians in Romania (not only those living in the Székely Land). The demand for Hungarian autonomy has been part of their program since 1993.

In 2014, the Hungarian Civic Party signed a settlement with the Democratic Union of Hungarians in Romania regarding cooperation and joint support for Hungarian autonomy.

In 2014 September, the Democratic Union of Hungarians presented its draft project (written jointly with the Hungarian Civic Party) for the autonomy of the Székely Land (Ținutul Secuiesc). The Hungarian People's Party of Transylvania also supports this.

== Events ==
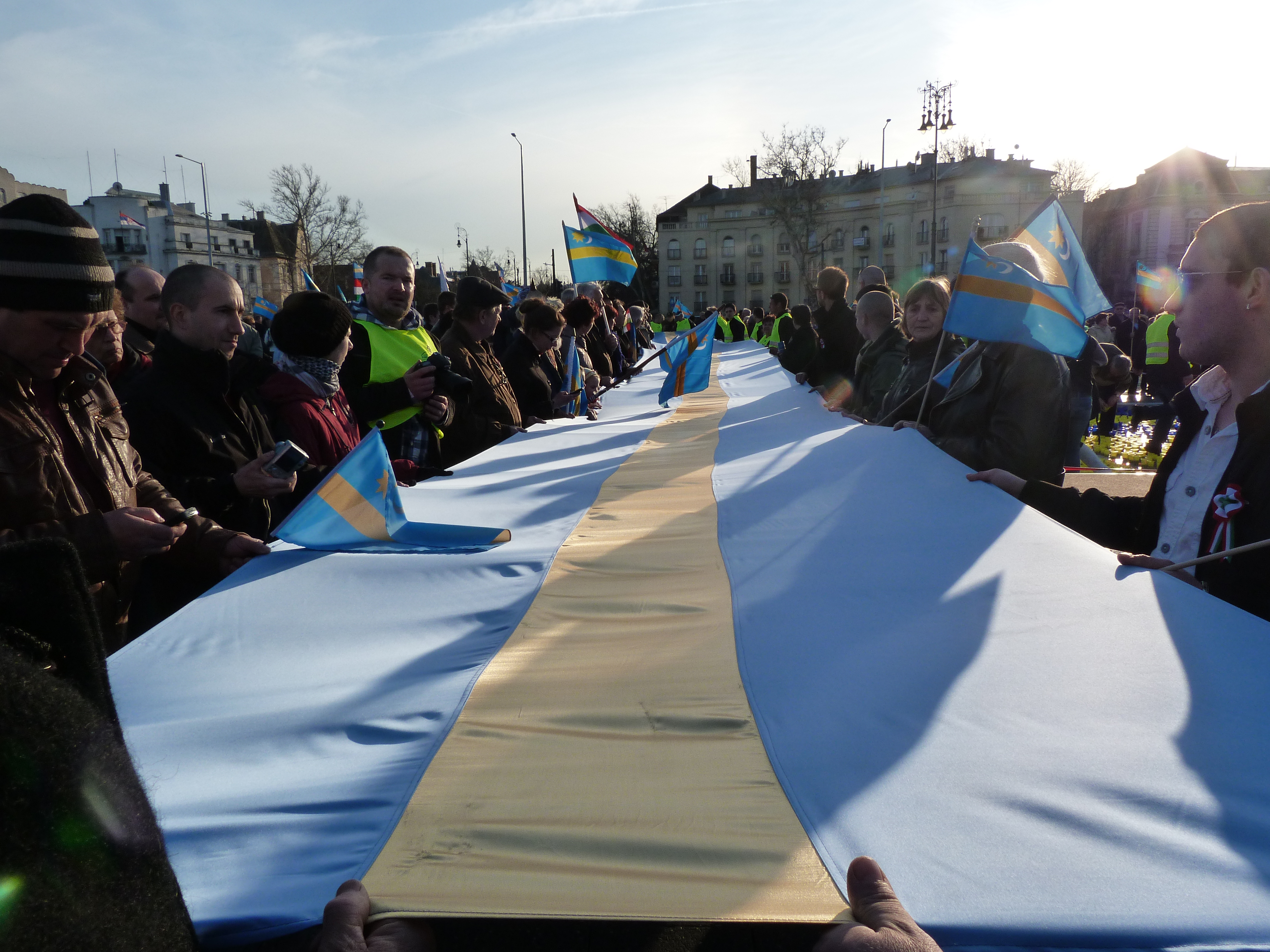
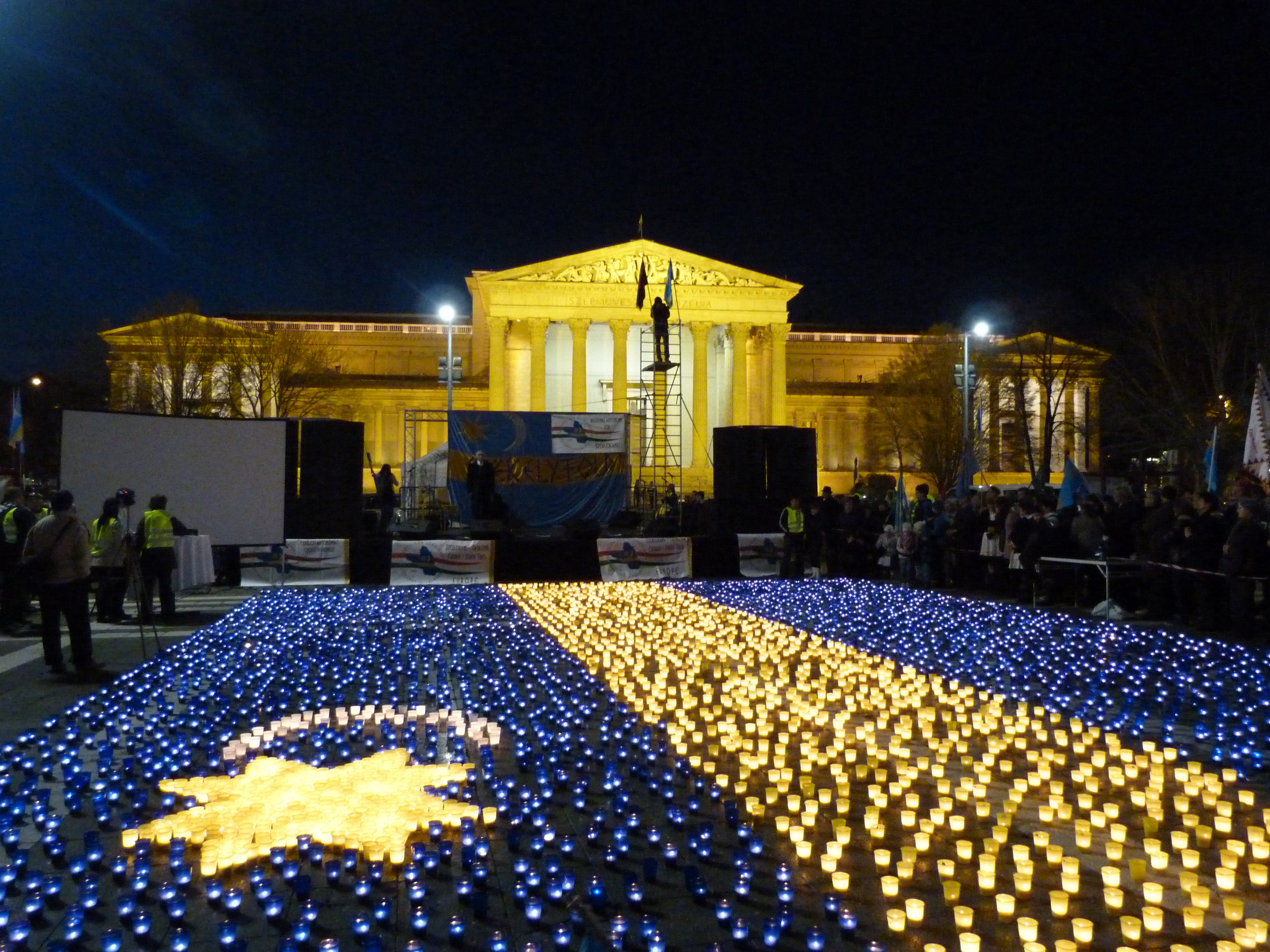
Demonstrations in support of Székely autonomy in Budapest on 10 March 2013 (the Székely Freedom Day) with the Székely flag

A Székely Land-based organization, the Szekler National Council held a peaceful demonstration in Odorheiu Secuiesc on March 15, 2006, in favor of autonomy where 4,000 to 10,000 people took part. Five days before this, President Traian Băsescu met with Jenő Szász (the mayor of Odorheiu Secuiesc and president of the Hungarian Civic Union), who assured the President of the peaceful character of the March 15 ceremonies, and also briefly presented the UCM's vision on autonomy. On March 16, Băsescu visited the town and met with local and county officials. Băsescu declared that the Romanian administrative system should be more decentralized, but only in a symmetrical way, with no more autonomy given to the Székely Land than to any other region in Romania.

On February 12, 2007, Hungarian President László Sólyom visited Romania and met with Băsescu. The discussions included the controversial topics of minority rights and autonomy. Băsescu pointed out that the situation of the Székely in Romania is in full compliance with the standards of the European Union. He also mentioned that a referendum for territorial autonomy would be illegal, and characterized the Székely initiative not as a test of the public opinion, but as a test of Romanian laws. Romania's Interior Ministry has said that organizing an informal poll is not illegal.

On 10 March 2013, thousands gathered to demonstrate for Székely autonomy. László Tőkés also participated on the march. The protest was performed in the Székely Freedom Day (Székely szabadság napja). This holiday had been established earlier on 6 January 2012 by the Szekler National Council.

In Autumn 2013, the "Great Székely's March for Autonomy" was held with tens of thousands of people forming a 53 km (33 mi) long human chain in Székely Land.

On 10 March 2014, again on the Székely Freedom Day, thousands demonstrated for Székely autonomy in Târgu Mureș.

In 2015, the Székely Autonomy Day was declared. It started being celebrated every last Sunday of October in 2016.

In December 2019, two deputies of the Democratic Alliance of Hungarians submitted a draft legislation favoring the autonomy of Székely Land. It was tacitly adopted by the Chamber of Deputies (the lower house of the Parliament of Romania), where the Social Democratic Party (PSD) held most seats, on 28 April 2020. After the draft bill exceeded the 45-day deadline for debate, it was automatically adopted. However, Romanian President Klaus Iohannis criticized the adoption of the draft on April 29 in a television speech in which he stated "as we ... fight the coronavirus pandemic, ... the PSD ... fights in the secret offices of parliament to give Transylvania to the Hungarians". He also used the Hungarian language in a mocking manner: "Bună ziua ("good day" in Romanian), dear Romanians; jó napot kívánok ("good day" in Hungarian), PSD". The same day, the Senate rejected the draft bill.

Iohannis' speech caused controversy, with Hungarian and Romanian officials and politicians criticizing him for it. In the end, Iohannis was fined RON 5,000 by the National Council for Combating Discrimination, but this was annulled by the High Court of Cassation and Justice.

== Constitutional issues ==
According to one of the arguments against autonomy in Romania, the initiative would be unconstitutional, as Article 1 of the Constitution of Romania states "Romania is a nation state, sovereign and independent, unitary and indivisible" which makes the autonomy of any part of Romania unconstitutional. Such a view point has been adopted by the Romanian Academy, lawyers in Romania and many Romanian politicians, including the Mayor of Cluj-Napoca, Emil Boc.

Others, including the SZNT argue that it is not against the constitution of Romania.

== Views of political parties ==
Territorial autonomy for the Székely Land was supported by the former People's Action party, headed by former president Emil Constantinescu.

In January 2018, Romanian Prime Minister Mihai Tudose threatened the Székely community in a television interview by saying that "If they hang the Székely flag [on institutions in Székely Land], they [the people who fly these flags] will hang alongside it. Autonomy for Székelys is out of the question." He also declared that "As a Romanian and as prime minister, I refuse any dialogue related to the autonomy of a part of Romania. It is a violation of the Constitution of this country, which guarantees, from the first paragraph, the unity and indivisibility of the Romanian state " 7 days later, Tudose was forced to resign from his position, partly due to the comments and infighting and lack of confidence via his party. He was also sanctioned by the National Council for Combating Discrimination in February 2018 for his remark.

The Civic Forum of the Romanians of Covasna, Harghita and Mureș is an organization operating within the territory of Székely Land which opposes Székely autonomy, as it sees the movement as a disguised attempt at oppressing and assimilating the Romanian minority of the region.
