= Ugron de Ábránfalva =

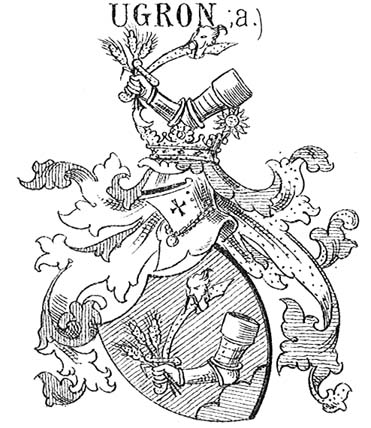
Coat of arms of the Hungarian Ugron d'Abránfalva family.

Ugron de Ábránfalva is one of the most ancient "Szekler" families, bearing the title "primor" (leader of the Szekler tribe).

The oldest settlement of the Ugron's was in Ábránfalva (Romanian: Obrăneşti, now a part of Ulieș), the family having owned the surrounding territory "jure primae occupationis" for more than a thousand years. Ábránfalva is in Hargita county, Transylvania, now Romania. The Ugron's are first mentioned in documents around the 13th century; some sources suggest that they are related to the Árpád dynasty the first Hungarian royal house. The uninterrupted documentation of the family begins with László Ugron who lived in the early 14th century.

Pál Ugron – 'dictus magnus' - living in the early 17th century, was the legal guardian of Gábor Bethlen, Prince of Transylvania, who created "the Golden Age of Transylvania" during his rule by building a strong and independent state which protected the borders of Europe from the Ottoman Empire.

The members of the Ugron family played an important role through the centuries in Transylvanian and later in Hungarian history and public life, as landlords, soldiers, politicians, ambassadors etc.

== Family members ==
- Gábor Ugron ab Abranfalva
- Stephan von Ugron zu Abranfalva
  - Castelul din Zau de Câmpie
