= Seat (administrative division) =

Division of medieval Hungary

Seats (Latin: sedes, Hungarian: szék, German: stuhl, Romanian: scaun) were administrative divisions in the medieval Kingdom of Hungary. The seats were autonomous regions within the Kingdom, and were independent from the feudal county system. Their autonomy was granted in return for the military services they provided to the Hungarian Kings.

The following divisions were at one point Székely seats:

- Marosszék
- Udvarhelyszék
- Csíkszék
- Gyergyószék
- Bardóc-Miklósvárszék
- Sepsiszék
- Orbaiszék
- Kézdiszék
- Aranyosszék

Seats were formed by the:

- Székelys
- Transylvanian Saxons
- Cumans, with six Cumanian seats
- Jassic people, with one Jazygian seat
- Ten Lance Bearers

Most seats gave up their autonomous status and military traditions in late medieval times and paid tax instead.
