= Udvarhelyszék =

Seat in the Székely Land

- Seat of the Székely Land
- 12th century–1876
- Coat of arms
- Capital: Székelyudvarhely
- Population
  - 1867: 96,929
- History
  - Hungarian conquest of the Carpathian Basin: 10–11th century
  - Settlement of the Székelys: 12th century
  - Administrative reform of the Kingdom of Hungary: 1876
- Today part of: Romania
- Odorheiu Secuiesc is the current name of the capital.

Udvarhelyszék (Hungarian pronunciation: [ˈudvɒrhɛjseːk]; formerly called Telegdiszék) was one of the Székely seats in the historical Székely Land.

Situated on the western part of the Székely Land, it was the main seat (Hungarian: anyaszék, Latin: sedes principalis, sedes capitalis) for a significant period, being the home of the Count of the Székelys and the Székely National Assembly; it also fulfilled the main administrative and judiciary functions.

It administered two sub-seats (Hungarian: fiúszék, Latin: sedes filialis): Bardócszék and Keresztúrszék.

== Population ==
The religious make-up of Udvarhelyszék in 1867 was the following:

- Calvinist: 35,759
- Roman Catholic: 34,282
- Unitarian: 22,263
- Greek Catholic: 2,054
- Greek Orthodox: 1,847
- Jewish: 115
- Lutheran: 113
- Foreigner: 496
- Total: 96,929

== Gallery ==
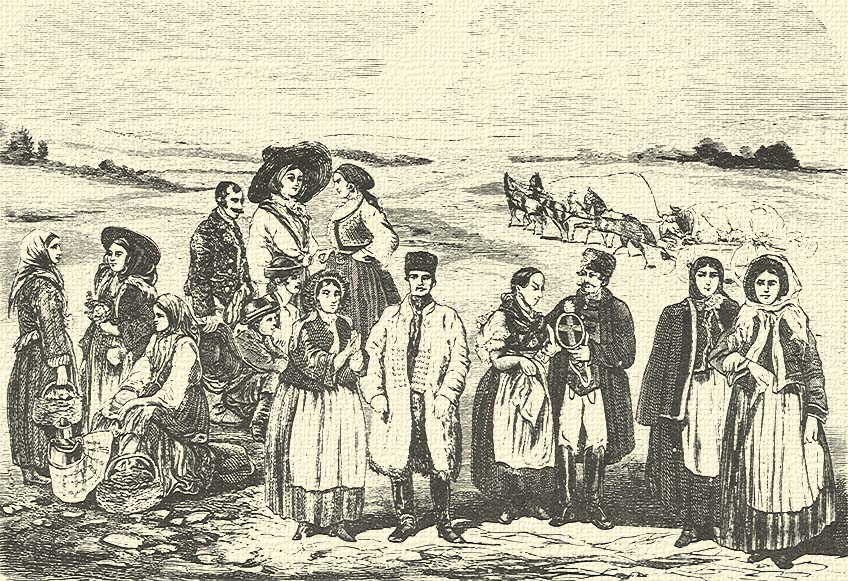
People of Udvarhelyszék wearing traditional costumes

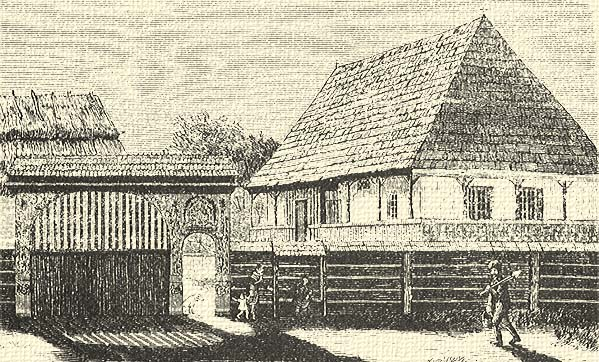
A typical Székely house in Udvarhelyszék

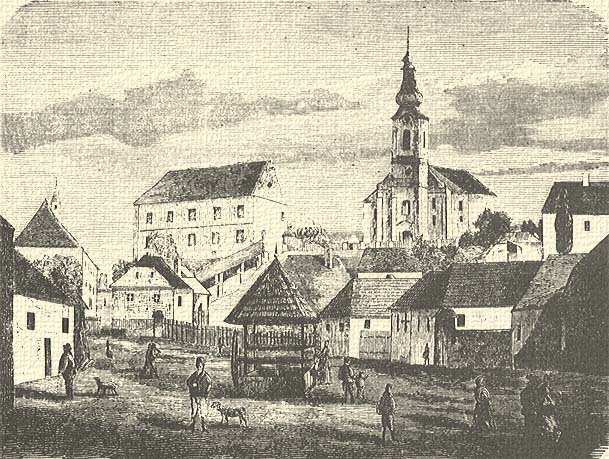
The Catholic Church of Székelyudvarhely with the Catholic Gymnasium

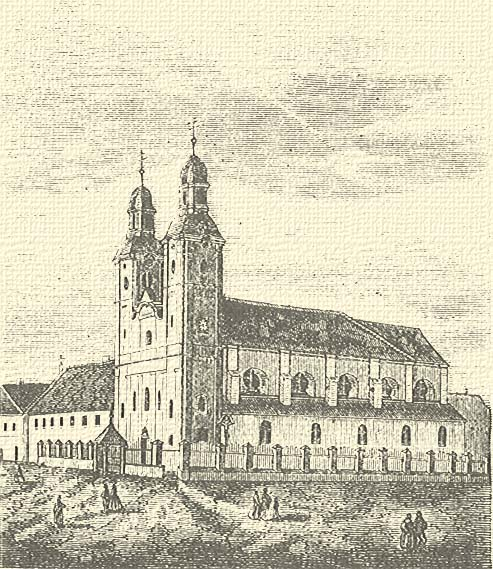
The Franciscan Monastery of Székelyudvarhely

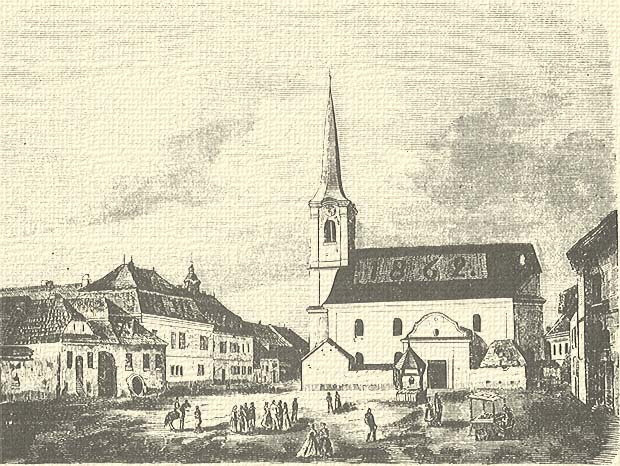
Reformed (Calvinist) Church of Székelyudvarhely with the Reformed High School
