= Háromszék County =

County of the Kingdom of Hungary

Háromszék County Comitatus Trisediensis (Latin) Háromszék vármegye (Hungarian) Komitat Háromszék (German) Comitatul Trei Scaune (Romanian)
- County of the Kingdom of Hungary (1876-1920, 1940-1945)
- Coat of arms

- Capital: Sepsiszentgyörgy
- Area
  - Coordinates: 45°52′N 25°47′E
  - 1910: 3,889 km^{2} (1,502 sq mi)
- Population
  - 1910: 148,100
- History
  - Established: 1876
  - Treaty of Trianon: 4 June 1920
  - County recreated (Second Vienna Award): 30 August 1940
  - Disestablished: 20 January 1945
- Today part of: Romania
- Sfântu Gheorghe is the current name of the capital.

Háromszék (Three Seats; Romanian: Trei Scaune) was an administrative county (comitatus) of the Kingdom of Hungary. Situated in south-eastern Transylvania, its territory is now in central Romania (in the counties of Covasna and Brașov. The capital of the county was Sepsiszentgyörgy (now Sfântu Gheorghe).

== Geography ==
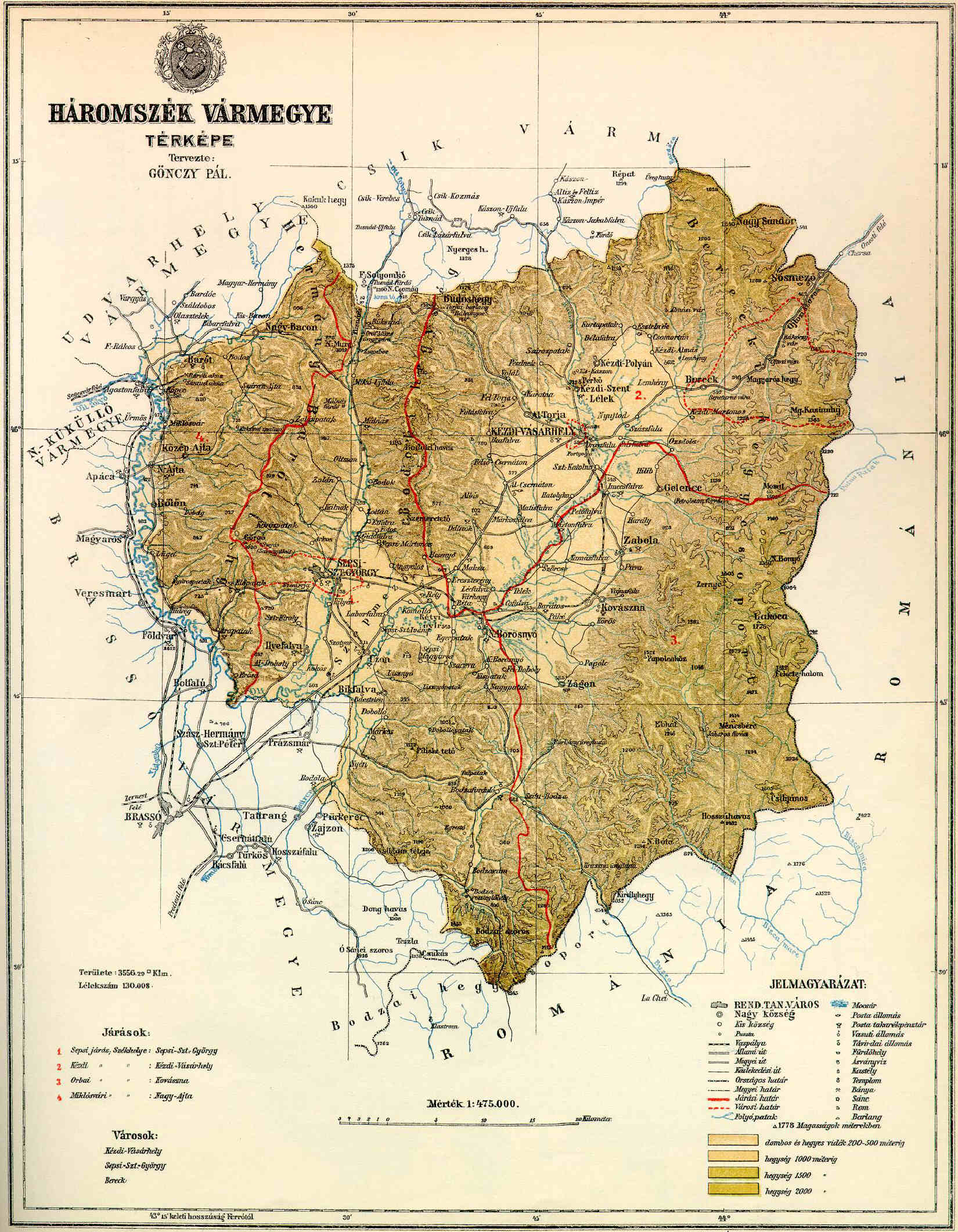
Map of Háromszék, 1891.

Háromszék county shared borders with Romania and the Hungarian counties Csík, Udvarhely, Nagy-Küküllő, and Brassó. The river Olt flowed through the county. The Carpathian Mountains formed its southern and eastern border. Its area was 3,889 km^{2} (1,502 sq mi) around 1910.

== History ==
Háromszék means "three seats". Háromszék County was a combination of three seats of the Székelys: Kézdiszék, Orbaiszék, and Sepsiszék (plus some villages of the former Felső-Fehér County). The county was formed in 1876, when the administrative structure of Transylvania was changed.

In 1920, under the Treaty of Trianon, the county became part of the Kingdom of Romania under the name Trei Scaune. After the Second Vienna Award of August 1940, the county was recreated with most of its historic territory as it became part of the Northern Transylvania territory of Hungary again until October 1944, towards the end of World War II.

Afterward, it became part of Romania again; its territory lies mainly in the present Romanian county of Covasna, with a small part in the south being part of Brașov County.

== Demographics ==
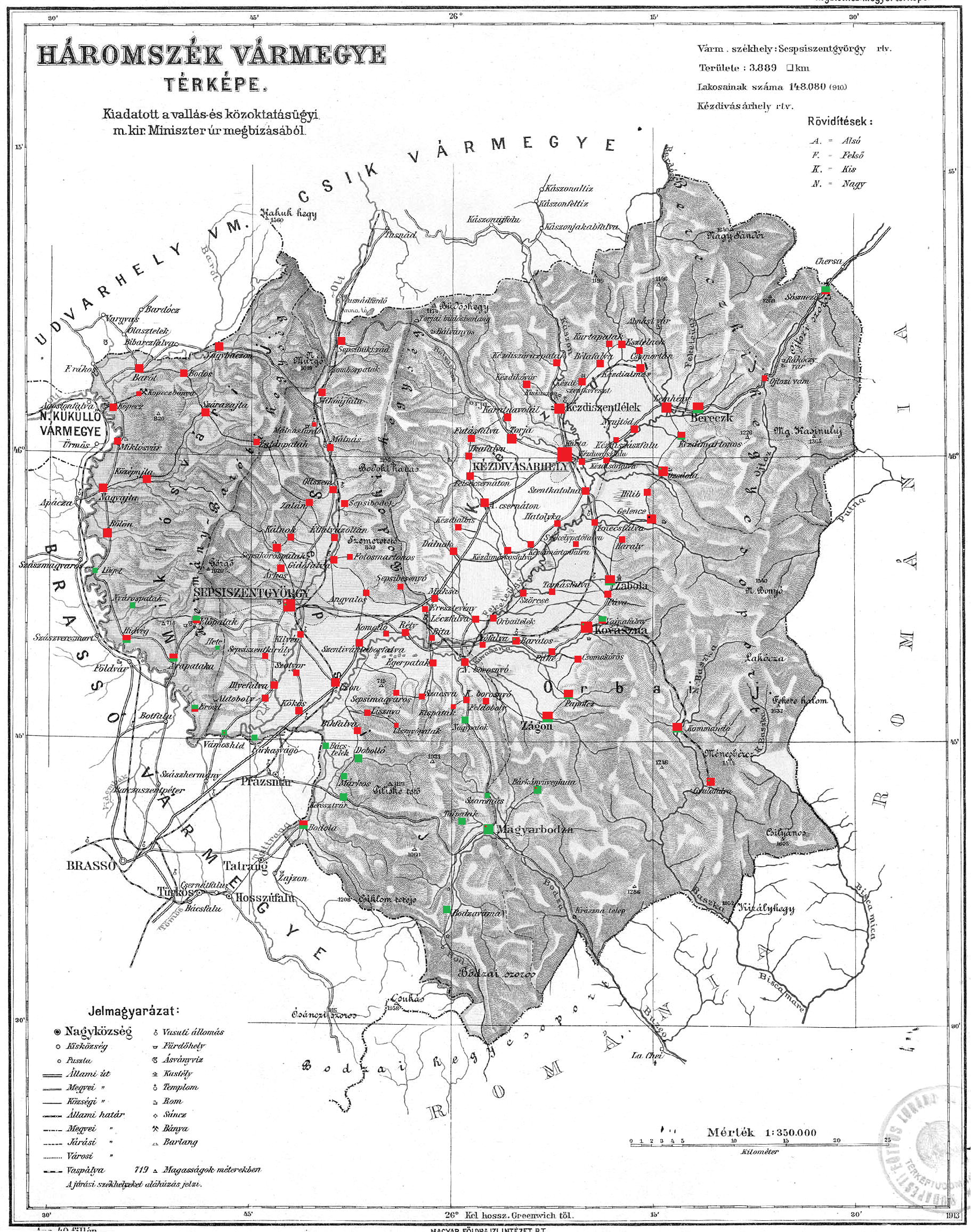
Ethnic map of the county with data of the 1910 census (see the key in the description)

Population by mother tongue (Note: Only linguistic communities > 1% are displayed.)
Census	Total	Hungarian	Romanian	Other or unknown
1880	125,277	104,607 (86.57%)	15,448 (12.78%)	783 (0.65%)
1890	130,008	110,799 (85.22%)	17,360 (13.35%)	1,849 (1.42%)
1900	137,261	116,755 (85.06%)	19,439 (14.16%)	1,067 (0.78%)
1910	148,080	123,518 (83.41%)	22,963 (15.51%)	1,599 (1.08%)

Population by religion (Note: Only religious communities > 1% are displayed.)
Census	Total	Calvinist	Roman Catholic	Eastern Orthodox	Unitarian	Greek Catholic	Other or unknown
1880	125,277	54,548 (43.54%)	41,468 (33.10%)	21,338 (17.03%)	5,029 (4.01%)	1,962 (1.57%)	932 (0.74%)
1890	130,008	55,869 (42.97%)	43,224 (33.25%)	22,529 (17.33%)	4,985 (3.83%)	2,404 (1.85%)	997 (0.77%)
1900	137,261	57,861 (42.15%)	45,681 (33.28%)	24,761 (18.04%)	5,102 (3.72%)	2,465 (1.80%)	1,391 (1.01%)
1910	148,080	60,030 (40.54%)	49,654 (33.53%)	28,077 (18.96%)	5,228 (3.53%)	3,052 (2.06%)	2,039 (1.38%)

=== Subdivisions ===
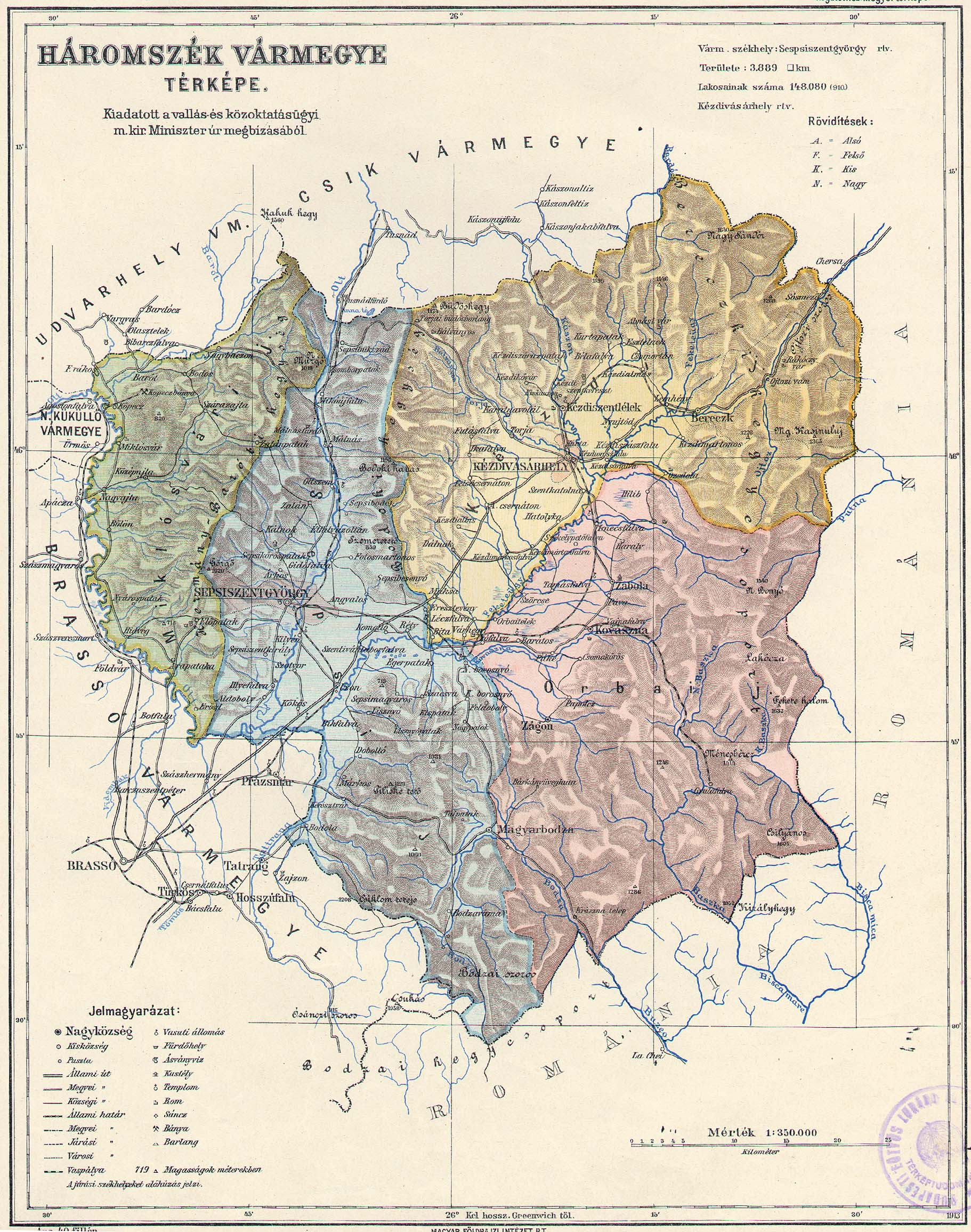

In the early 20th century, the subdivisions of Háromszék county were:

Districts (járás)
District	Capital
Kézdi	Kézdivásárhely (now Târgu Secuiesc)
Miklósvár	Nagyajta (now Aita Mare)
Orbai	Kovászna (now Covasna)
Sepsi	Sepsiszentgyörgy (now Sfântu Gheorghe)
Urban districts (rendezett tanácsú város)
Kézdivásárhely (now Târgu Secuiesc)
Sepsiszentgyörgy (now Sfântu Gheorghe)
