= Csíkszék =

- Seat of the Székely Land
- 11th century–1876
- Capital: Csíksomlyó
- Population
  - 1867: 111,237
- History
  - Settlement of the Székelys: 11th century
  - Administrative reform of the Kingdom of Hungary: 1876
- Today part of: Romania
- Șumuleu Ciuc is the current name of the capital.

Csíkszék (Hungarian pronunciation: [ˈt͡ʃiːkseːk]) was one of the Székely seats in the historical Székely Land.

It administered two sub-seats (Hungarian: fiúszék, Latin: sedes filialis), namely Gyergyószék and Kászonszék. It was divided on the natural borders of the region, as the main territory of Csíkszék lay in the valley of the Olt River, Gyergyószék lay in the valley of the river Maros (Mureș), while Kászonszék lay in the valley of the river Kászon (Cașin).

== Population ==
The religious composition of Csíkszék's population in 1867 was as follows:

- Roman Catholic: 96,525
- Greek Catholic: 13,028
- Eastern Orthodox: 17
- Others: 1.667
- Total: 111,237

== Gallery ==
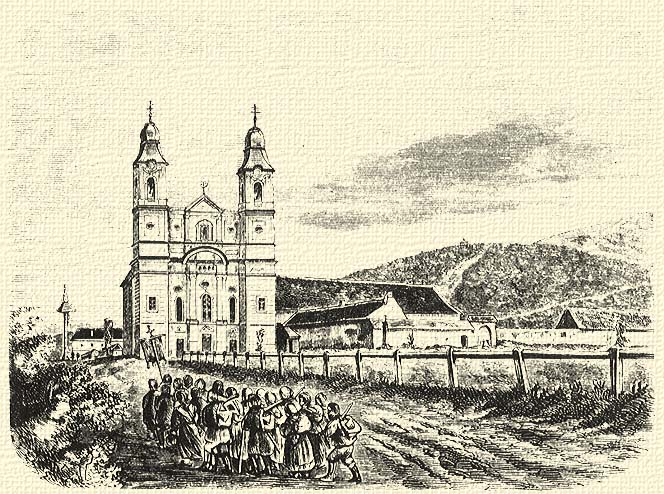
The Franciscan Church and Monastery in Csíksomlyó

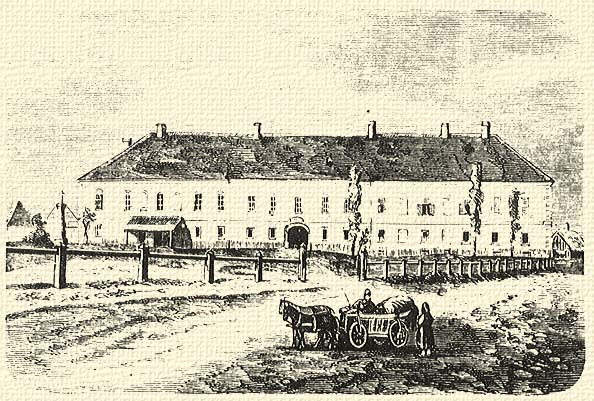
The Guildhall of Csíkszék in Csíksomlyó

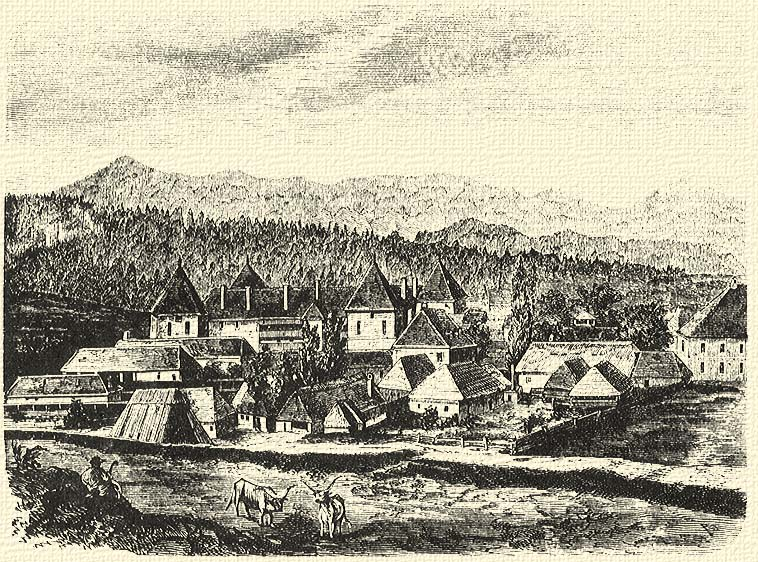
The castle of Csíkszereda

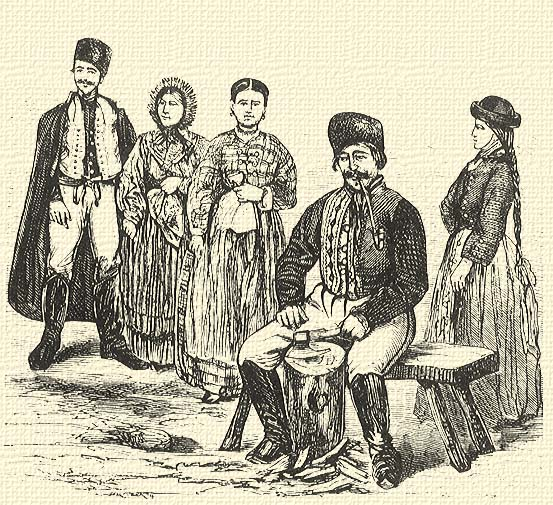
People of Csíkszék in traditional costumes
