= Székelys =

Hungarian subgroup in Romania

- Flag of the Székelys

Total population
- est. 500,000–700,000 (Note: 532 of them declared themselves as Székely rather than Hungarian at the 2011 Romanian census.)

Regions with significant populations
- Romania (Harghita, Covasna, parts of Mureș as well as some villages in Suceava County, Bukovina), Hungary (Tolna and Baranya), Serbia (Vojvodina)

Languages
- Hungarian (Székely dialect), Romanian language, Serbian language in Serbia

Religion
- Roman Catholic, Hungarian Reformed, Unitarian, Eastern Orthodox

Related ethnic groups
- Other Hungarians (incl. Csángós)

The Székelys (pronounced [ˈseːkɛj], Székely runes: 𐳥𐳋𐳓𐳉𐳗), also referred to as Szeklers, (Note: Hungarian: székelyek; Romanian: secui; German: Szekler; Latin: Siculi; Serbian: Секељи, romanized: Sekelji; Slovak: Sikuli) are a Hungarian subgroup living mostly in the Székely Land in Romania. Of the Székelys of Bukovina, some are still living in their native villages in Suceava County in Bukovina, but a significant number of their descendants are currently living in Tolna and Baranya counties in Hungary and certain districts of Vojvodina in Serbia.

In the Middle Ages, the Székelys played a role in the defense of the Kingdom of Hungary against the Ottomans in their posture as guards of the eastern border. With the Treaty of Trianon of 1920, Transylvania (including the Székely Land) became part of Romania, and the Székely population was a target of Romanianization efforts. In 1952, during the communist rule of Romania, the former counties with the highest concentration of Székely population – Mureș, Odorhei, Ciuc, and Trei Scaune – were legally designated as the Magyar Autonomous Region. It was superseded in 1960 by the Mureș-Magyar Autonomous Region, itself divided in 1968 into two non-autonomous counties, Harghita and Mureș. In post-Cold War Romania, where the Székelys form roughly half of the ethnic Hungarian population, members of the group have been among the most vocal of Hungarians seeking an autonomous Székely region in Transylvania. They were estimated to number about 860,000 in the 1970s and are officially recognized as a distinct minority group by the Romanian government.

Today's Székely Land roughly corresponds to the Romanian counties of Harghita, Covasna, and central and eastern Mureș where they currently make up roughly 80% of the population. Based on the official 2011 Romanian census, 1,227,623 ethnic Hungarians live in Romania, mostly in the region of Transylvania, making up 19.6% of the population of this region. Of these, 609,033 live in the counties of Harghita, Covasna, and Mureș, which taken together have a Hungarian majority (58%). The Hungarians in Székely Land, therefore, account for half (49.41%) of the Hungarians in Romania. When given the choice on the 2011 Romanian census between ethnically identifying as Székely or as Hungarian, the overwhelming majority of the Székelys chose the latter – only 532 persons declared themselves as ethnic Székely.

== History ==
The Székely territories came under the leadership of the Count of the Székelys (Latin: Comes Siculorum), initially a royal appointee from the non-Székely Hungarian nobility who was de facto a margrave; from the 15th century onward, the voivodes of Transylvania held the office themselves. The Székelys were considered a distinct ethnic group (natio Siculica) and formed part of the Unio Trium Nationum ("Union of Three Nations"), a coalition of three Transylvanian estates, the other two "nations" being the (also predominantly Hungarian) nobility and the Saxons (that is, ethnic German burghers). These three groups ruled Transylvania from 1438 onward, usually in harmony though sometimes in conflict with one another. During the Long Turkish War, the Székelys formed an alliance with Prince Michael the Brave of Wallachia against the army of Andrew Báthory, recently appointed Prince of Transylvania.

In the Middle Ages, the Székelys played a role in the defense of the Kingdom of Hungary against the Ottomans in their posture as guards of the eastern border. Nicolaus Olahus stated in the book Hungaria et Athila in 1536 that "Hungarians and Székelys share the same language, with the difference that the Székelys have their own words specific to their nation." The people of Székelys were in general regarded as the most Hungarian of Hungarians. In 1558, a Hungarian poet, Mihály Vilmányi Libécz voiced this opinion, instructing the reader in his poem that if they had doubts about the correctness of the Hungarian language: "Consult without fail the language of the ancient Székelys, for they are the guardians of the purest Hungarian tongue".

=== Origins ===
The origin of the Székelys has been much debated. It is now generally accepted that they are descendants of Hungarians. The Székelys have historically claimed descent from Attila's Huns and believed they played a special role in shaping Hungary. Ancient legends recount that a contingent of Huns remained in Transylvania, later allying with the main Hungarian army that conquered the Carpathian Basin in the 9th century. The thirteenth-century chronicler Simon of Kéza also claimed that the Székely people descended from Huns who lived in mountainous lands prior to the Hungarian conquest.

These Székelys were the remains of the Huns, who when they learned that the Hungarians had returned to Pannonia for the second time, went to the returnees on the border of Ruthenia and conquered Pannonia together.

— Simon of Kéza: Gesta Hunnorum et Hungarorum

They were afraid of the western nations that they would suddenly attack them, so they went to Transylvania and did not call themselves Hungarians, but Székelys. The western clan hated the Huns in Attila's life. The Székelys are thus the remnants of the Huns, who remained in the mentioned field until the return of the other Hungarians. So when they knew that the Hungarians would return to Pannonia again, they hurried to Ruthenia to them, conquering the land of Pannonia together.

— Mark of Kalt, Chronicon Pictum

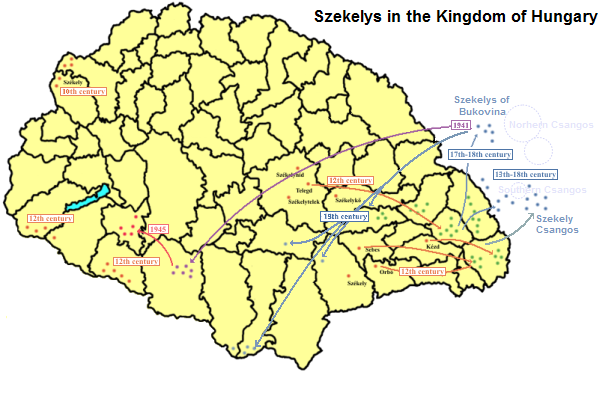
Székely people in the Kingdom of Hungary

After the theory of Hunnic descent lost scholarly currency in the 20th century, two substantial ideas emerged about Székely ancestry:

- Some scholars suggested that the Székelys were simply Magyars, like other Hungarians, were relocated from western parts of Hungary in the Middle Ages in the 12th century to guard the frontiers. Researchers could not prove that Székelys spoke a different language. In this case, their strong cultural differences from other Hungarians stem from centuries of relative isolation in the mountains.
- Others suggested Turkic origin as Avar, Kabar or Esegel-Bulgar ancestries.

Some theories suggest that the Székelys might have absorbed influences from various groups, including Turkic tribes, but this is more about cultural exchange rather than direct lineage. Overall, while there may be historical connections and interactions, the Székelys are primarily of Hungarian origin.

- According to a new model, the Székelys are the descendants of those "wanderers" who ran away from the feudal state and the landlord system mostly during the 11th and 12th centuries. These parasocial groups settled in border regions and hard-to-reach places (forests, swamps) down where the institutional vacuum allowed them to found independent communities. The Hungarian kings reintegrated these groups into the kingdom's society from the beginning of the 12th century. The Hungarian Hajdúk, Cossacks, Maroons, and ʿApiru offer an analogy for the process.

Some historians have dated the Székely presence in the Eastern Carpathian Mountains as early as the fifth century, and found historical evidence that the Székelys were part of the Avar confederation during the so-called Dark Ages, but this does not mean that they were ethnically Avar.

Research indicates that Székelys spoke Hungarian. Toponyms at the Székely settlement area also give proof of their Hungarian mother tongue. The Székely dialect does not have more Bulgaro-Turkish loanwords derived from before the Hungarian conquest of the Carpathian Basin than standard Hungarian does. Even if the Székelys had been a Turkic stock, they would have had to lose their original vernacular at a very early date.

== Genetics ==
An autosomal analysis, studying non-European admixture in Europeans, found 4.4% of admixture of East Asian/Central Asian among Hungarians, which was the strongest among sampled populations. It was found at 3.6% in Belarusians, 2.5% in Romanians, 2.3% in Bulgarians and Lithuanians, 1.9% in Poles and 0% in Greeks. The authors stated, "This signal might correspond to a small genetic legacy from invasions of peoples from the Asian steppes (e.g., the Huns, Avars, and Bulgars) during the first millennium."

Among 100 Hungarian men (90 of them from the Great Hungarian Plain), the following haplogroups and frequencies are obtained:

Haplogroup	R1a	R1b	I2a1	J2	E1b1b1a	I1	G2	J1	I*	E*	F*	K*
Frequency	30%	15%	13%	13%	9%	8%	3%	3%	3%	1%	1%	1%

The 97 Székelys belong to the following haplogroups:

Haplogroup	R1b	R1a	I1	J2	J1	E1b1b1a	I2a1	G2	P*	E*	N
Frequency	20%	19%	17%	11%	10%	8%	5%	5%	3%	1%	1%

A study estimating possible Inner Asian admixture among nearly 500 Hungarians based on paternal lineages only, estimated it at 5.1% in Hungary, at 7.4% in Székelys and at 6.3% at Csángós. It has boldly been noted that this is an upper limit by deep SNPs and that the main haplogroups responsible for that contribution are J2-M172 (negative M47, M67, L24, M12), J2-L24, R1a-Z93, Q-M242 and E-M78, the last of which is typically European, while N is still negligible (1.7%). In an attempt to divide N into subgroups L1034 and L708, some Hungarian, Székely, and Uzbek samples were found to be L1034 SNP positive, while all Mongolians, Buryats, Khanty, Finnish, and Roma samples showed a negative result for this marker. The 2,500-year-old SNP L1034 was found typical for Mansi and Hungarians, the closest linguistic relatives.

Recent genomic and archeogenetic research has confirmed a high degree of genetic affinity between the modern Székelys and the broader Hungarian population. A 2022 whole-genome analysis focusing on the Székely population of Korond (Mátyás et al., 2022) revealed a highly homogeneous genetic structure and extensive shared identity-by-descent (IBD) segments with modern-day Hungarians, showing no significant genetic isolation. Furthermore, a 2023 comprehensive study (Borbély et al., 2023) mapped full mitogenomes and Y-chromosomal profiles, confirming that the Székely genetic makeup is predominantly Central and Eastern European, clustering closely with modern Hungarians. These genomic studies indicate high genetic affinity between the modern Székely and broader Hungarian populations, challenging earlier theories of isolation or distinct origins.

== Demographics ==
The Székely live mainly in Harghita, Covasna and Mureș counties. They identify themselves as Hungarians, but they maintain a somewhat distinct ethnic identity from other Hungarians. Hungarians form a majority of the population in the counties of Covasna and Harghita. They were estimated to number about 860,000 in the 1970s and are officially recognized as a distinct minority group by the Romanian government.

County	Hungarians (2002)	% of county population (2002)
Harghita	257,707	84.62%
Covasna	150,468	73.74%
Mureș	200,858	38.09%

The Székelys of Bukovina, today settled mostly in Vojvodina and southern Hungary, form a culturally separate group with its own history.

Ethnic map of Harghita, Covasna and Mureș showing areas with Hungarian majority

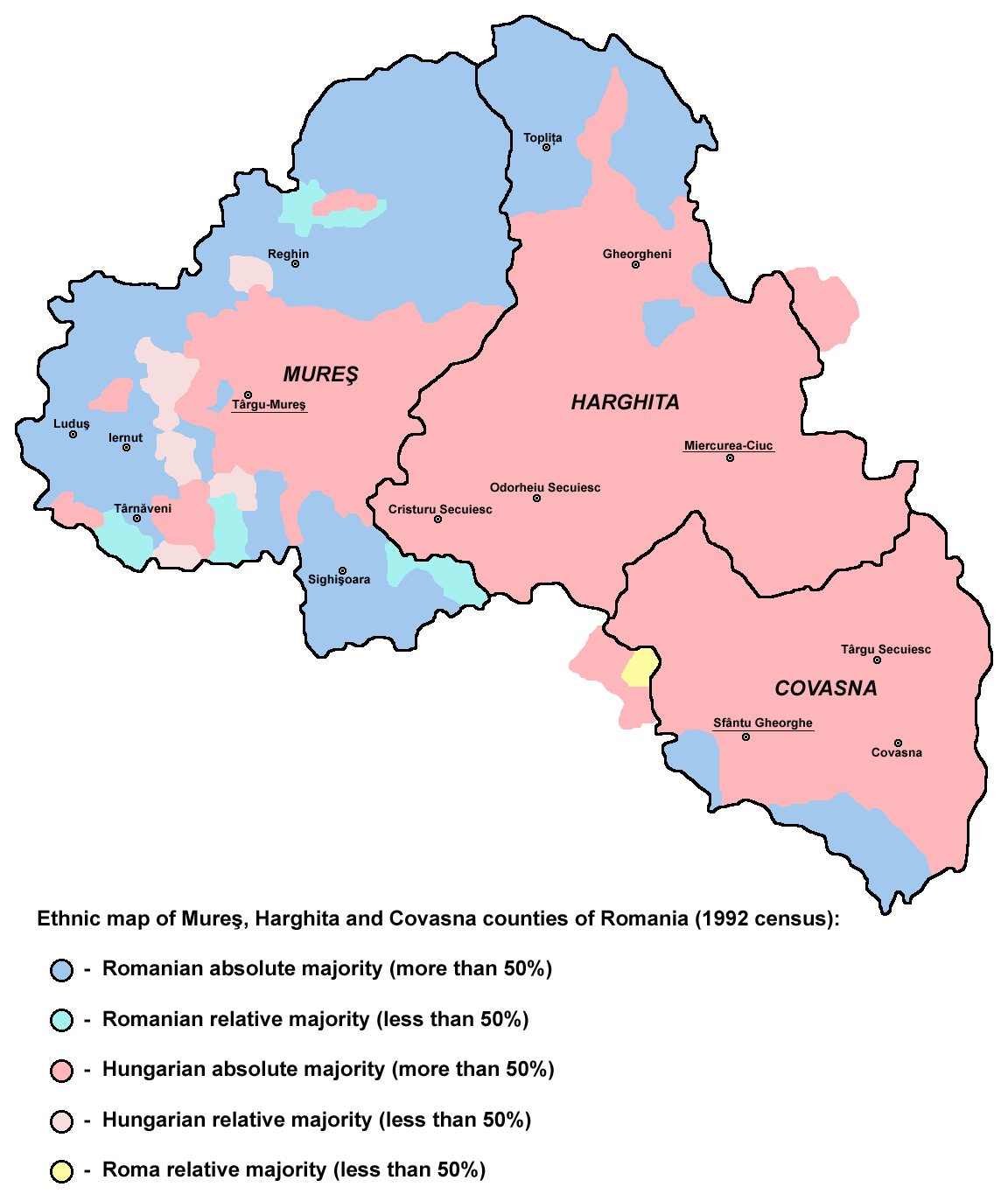
based on the 1992 data

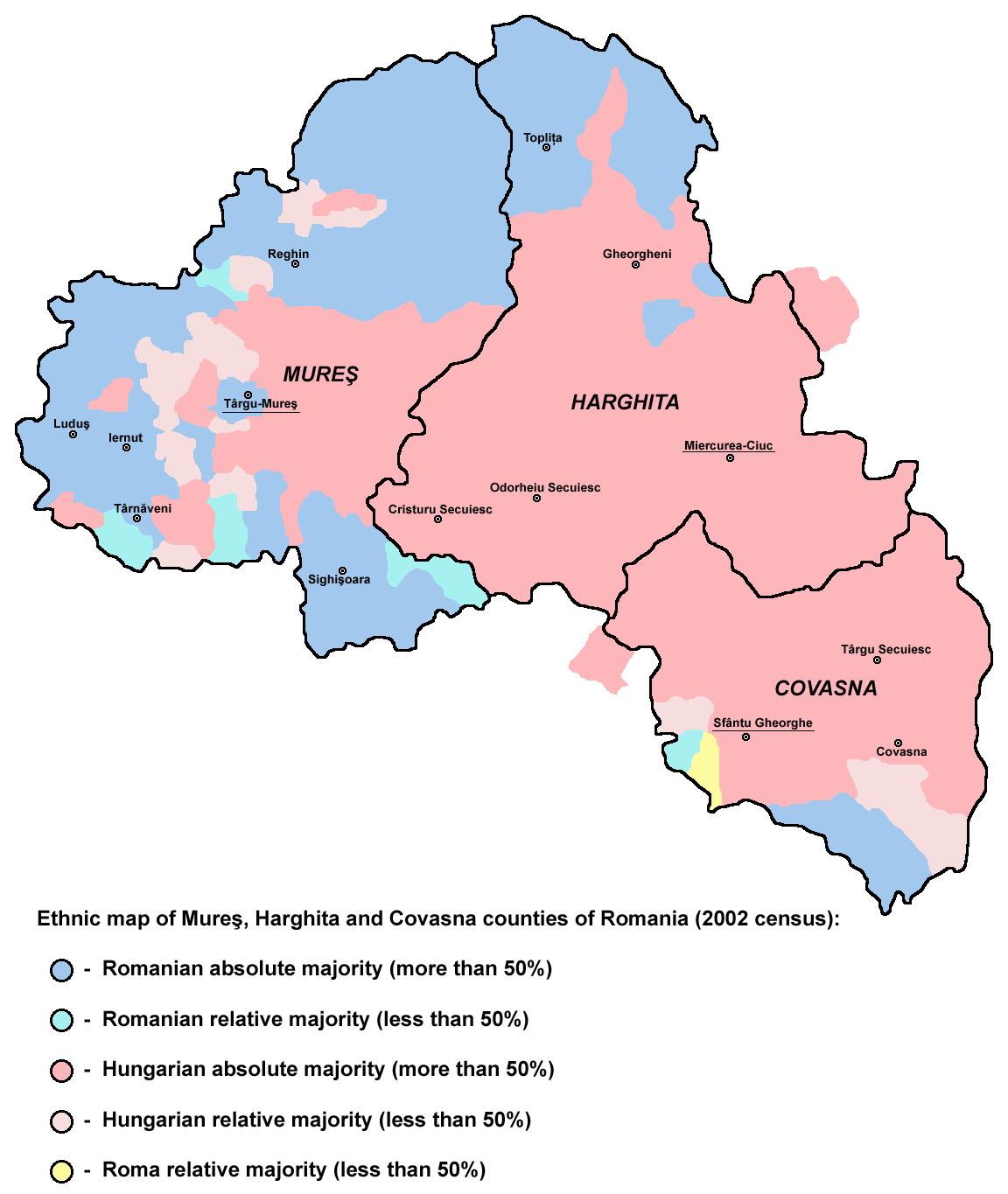
based on the 2002 data

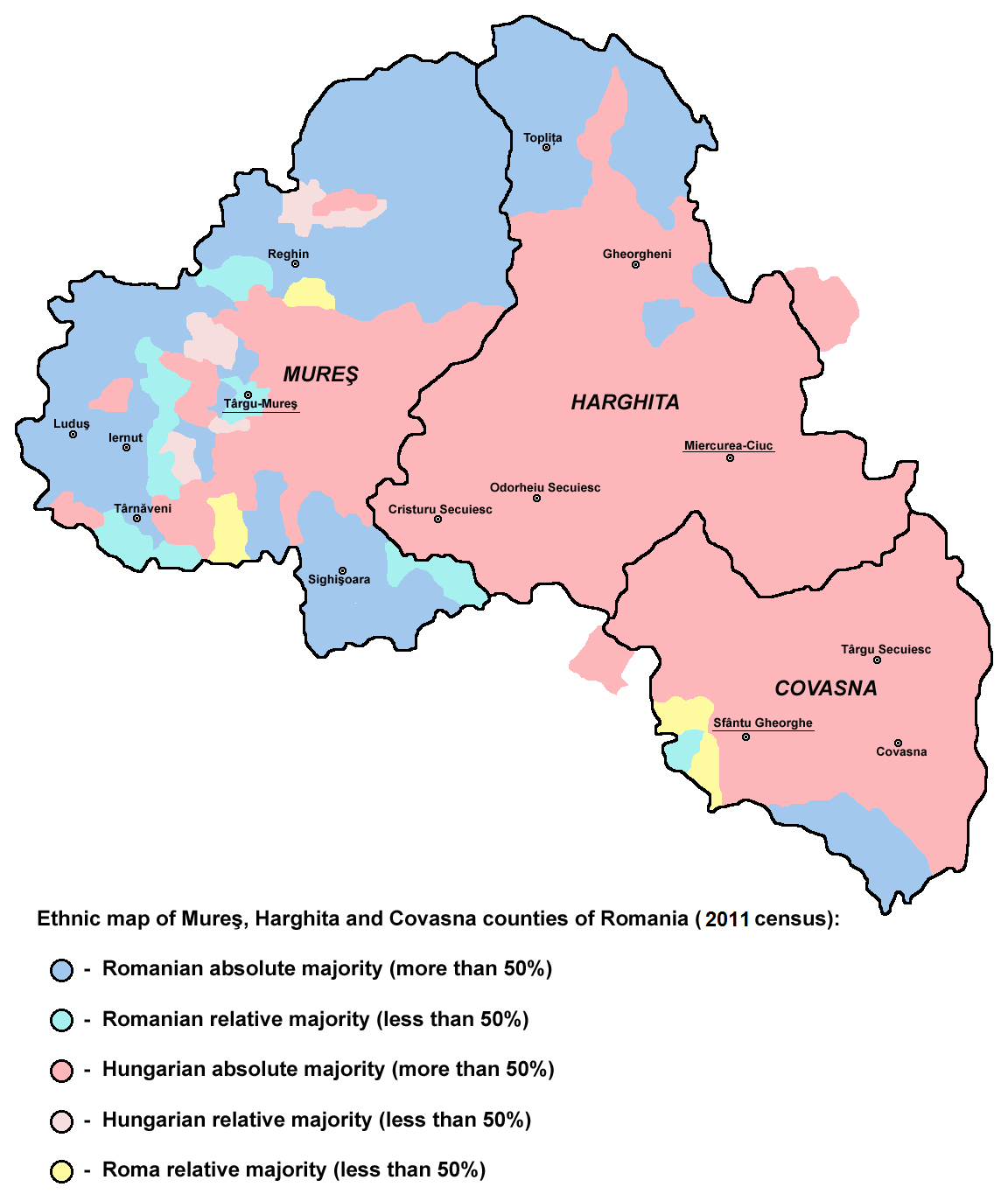
based on the 2011 data

== Autonomy ==
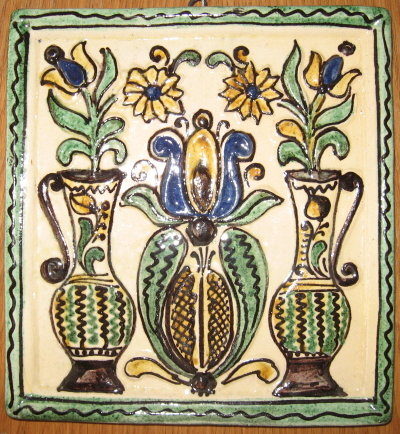
Székely pottery (stove tile)

An autonomous Székely region existed between 1952 and 1968. First created as the Magyar Autonomous Region in 1952, it was renamed the Mureș-Magyar Autonomous Region in 1960. Ever since the abolition of the Mureș-Magyar Autonomous Region by the Ceaușescu regime in 1968, some of the Székely have pressed for their autonomy to be restored. Several proposals have been discussed within the Székely Hungarian community and by the Romanian majority. One of the Székely autonomy initiatives is based on the model of the Spanish autonomous community of Catalonia. A major peaceful demonstration was held in 2006 in favor of autonomy.

In 2013 and 2014, thousands of ethnic Hungarians marched for autonomy on 10 March (on the Székely Freedom Day) in Târgu Mureș, Romania. 10 March is the anniversary of the execution in Târgu Mureș in 1854, by the Austrian authorities, of three Székelys who tried to achieve national self-determination. Since 2015, the Székelys also have the Székely Autonomy Day, celebrated every last Sunday of October.

== Literature ==
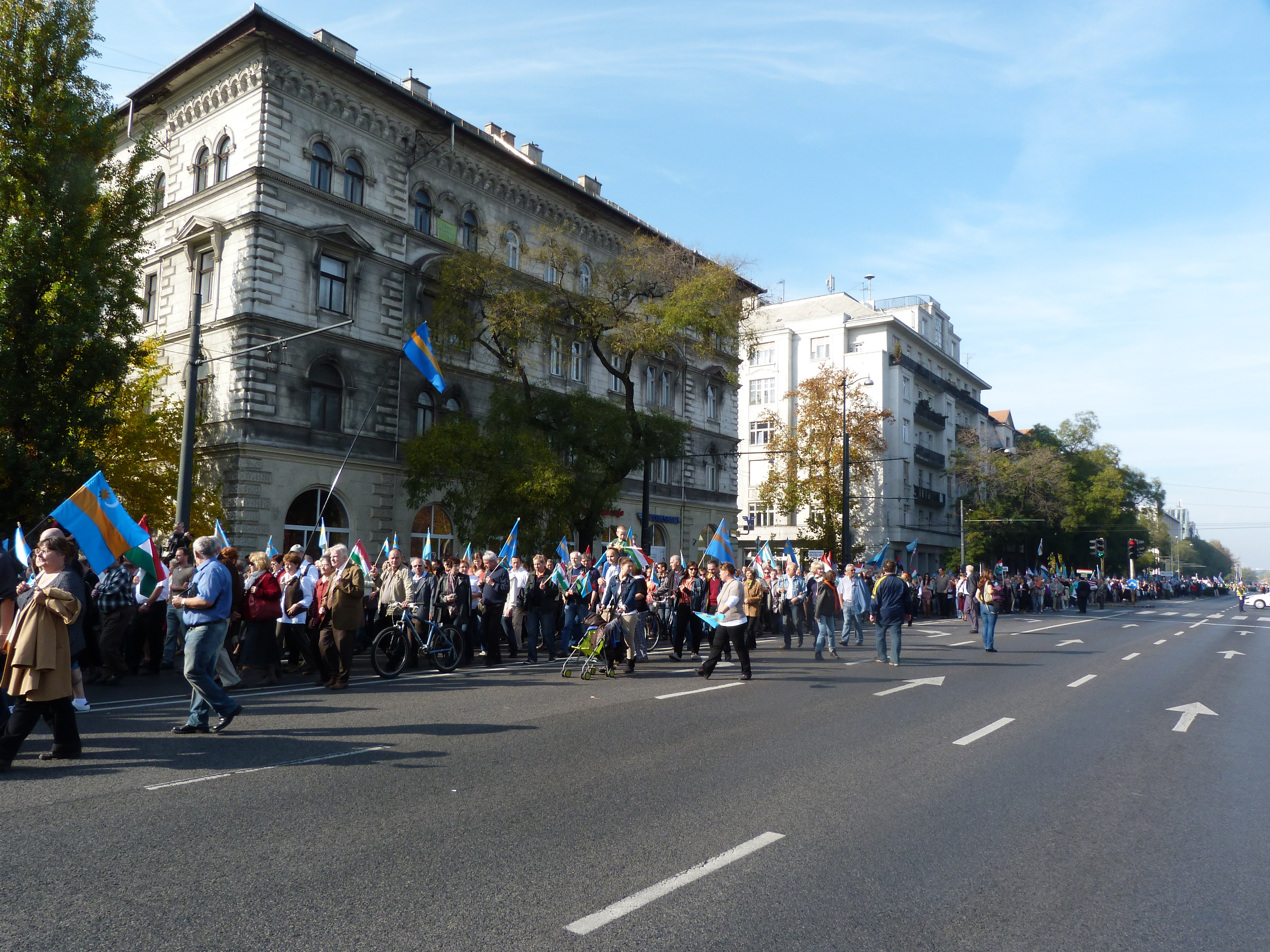
Demonstration for the Autonomy of Székely Land – 2013, Budapest.

Áron Tamási, a 20th-century Székely writer from Lupeni, Harghita, wrote many novels about the Székely which set universal stories of love and self-individuation against the backdrop of Székely village culture. Other Székely writers include the folklorist Elek Benedek, the novelist József Nyírő and the poet Sándor Kányádi.

In the novel Dracula by Bram Stoker, the title character Dracula declares himself to be a Székely.

== Symbols ==

The flag and coat of arms of the Székelys as approved by the Szekler National Council, one of the main political organizations of the Székelys.

The Sun and Moon are the symbols of the Székelys, and are used in the coat of arms of Transylvania and on the Romanian national coat of arms. The Sun and the Moon, the symbols of the cosmic world, are known from Hungarian grave findings from the period of the Hungarian conquest. After the Hungarians became Christians in the 11th century, the importance of these icons became purely visual and symbolic. The Székelys have succeeded in preserving traditions to an extent unusual even in Central and Eastern Europe. A description of the Székely Land and its traditions was written between 1859 and 1868 by Balázs Orbán in his Description of the Székely Land.

== See also ==
- History of the Székely people
- Lackfi family
- Kálnoky family
- Barlabássy family
- Lázár family
- Apor family
- Hungarian people
- Old Hungarian script
- Ugrians
- Székely Land
- List of Székelys
- List of Székely settlements
- Szekler National Council
- Count of the Székelys
- Székelys of Bukovina
- Ugron de Ábránfalva

== Sources ==
- Eberhardt, Piotr (2003). Ethnic Groups and Population Changes in Twentieth-century Central-Eastern Europe. Armonk, NY and London, England: M. E. Sharpe. ISBN 978-0-7656-0665-5.
- Köpeczi, Béla, ed. (2001–2002). History of Transylvania. Boulder, CO; Highland Lakes, NJ: Social Science Monographs; Atlantic Research and Publications. LCCN 2001131858. OCLC 469634201. Co-published with the Hungarian Research Institute of Canada. Distributed by Columbia University Press, New York.
  - Makkai, László; Mócsy, András; Szász, Zoltán, eds. (2001). From the Beginnings to 1606. Vol. 1. Boulder, CO: Social Science Monographs. ISBN 978-0-88033-479-2. OCLC 422798284.
    - Makkai, László. "The Three Feudal 'Nations' and the Ottoman Threat". In Makkai, Mócsy & Szász (2001).
  - Köpeczi, Béla (2002b). From 1606 to 1830. Vol. 2. Social Science Monographs. ISBN 978-0-88033-491-4. OCLC 51194226.
  - Köpeczi, Béla; Szász, Zoltán (2002c). From 1830 to 1919. Vol. 3. Social Science Monographs. ISBN 978-0-88033-497-6. OCLC 51194272.
