= List of Székelys =

This is a list of notable Székelys (a Hungarian subgroup living mostly in the Székely Land in Romania, estimated to number about 500,000–700,000 as of 2022) and of people of Székely descent, sorted by field and name:

== Athletes ==
- Francisc Balla (born 1932), freestyle wrestler, won silver medals at the 1965 and 1967 World Wrestling Championships and a silver medal (1967) and bronze medal (1968) at the European Wrestling Championships
- Mihály Bodosi (1909 – 2005), athlete, competed in the men's high jump at the 1936 Summer Olympics
- László Bölöni (born 1953), Romanian football player and manager of Hungarian ethnicity
- Zsolt Erőss (1968 – 2013), mountain climber
- Réka Forika (born 1989), Romanian biathlete of Hungarian ethnicity, won a gold medal at the Biathlon Junior World Championships 2010
- Csaba Györffy (1943 – 2018), Romanian international footballer
- Mónika György (born 1982), Romanian cross-country skier of Hungarian ethnicity
- Kálmán Hazai (1913 – 1996), water polo player, won a gold medal at the 1936 Summer Olympics
- Ferenc Ilyés (born 1981), Hungarian international handball player
- Emil Imre (born 1996), Romanian short track speed skater of Hungarian ethnicity, won a gold medal at the 2013 European Youth Olympic Winter Festival
- Kriszta Incze (born 1996), freestyle wrestler, won a silver medal at the 2019 European Championships, a bronze medal at the 2021 European Championships, a bronze medal at the 2022 European Championships, and another bronze medal at the 2019 European Games
- Zoltán Kádár (born 1966), Romanian international football player of Hungarian ethnicity
- Zoltán Kelemen (born 1986), Romanian figure skater
- Lajos Keresztes (1900 – 1978), wrestler, won a gold medal at the 1928 Summer Olympics and a silver medal at the 1924 Summer Olympics
- Katalin Kristó (born 1983), Romanian short track speed skater of Hungarian ethnicity
- Csaba László (born 1964), Romanian-Hungarian professional football manager
- Márton Lőrincz (1911 – 1969), wrestler, won a gold medal at the 1936 Summer Olympics
- Tímea Lőrincz (born 1992), Romanian cross-country skier of Hungarian ethnicity
- Edit Matei (born 1964), Austrian-Romanian international handball player
- Edit Miklós (born 1988), Hungarian-Romanian World Cup alpine ski racer of Hungarian ethnicity; she began skiing at age five, participating in World Cup races for children by the age of 12, and making her World Cup debut in December 2005 at age 17
- Endre Molnár (born 1945), water polo player, won a gold medal at the 1976 Summer Olympics, as well as a silver medal at the 1972 Summer Olympics, a bronze medal at the 1968 Summer Olympics, and another bronze medal at the 1980 Summer Olympics
- Roland Niczuly (born 1995), Romanian professional football player, captain of Sepsi OSK
- Carol-Eduard Novak (born 1976), Romanian road and track racing cyclist of Hungarian ethnicity
- Tibor Selymes (born 1970), Romanian international football player
- Iozefina Ștefănescu (1932 – 2015), Romanian handball player
- Ecaterina Szabo (born 1967), artistic gymnast, won 20 Olympic, world and continental medals, including four Olympic golds
- Éva Székely (1927 – 2020), swimmer, won a gold medal at the 1952 Summer Olympics and a silver medal at the 1956 Summer Olympics
- Bernadette Szőcs (born 1995), Romanian professional table tennis player
- Emőke Szőcs (born 1985), Romanian-born biathlonist
- Éva Tófalvi (born 1978), Romanian biathlete of Hungarian ethnicity
- Maria Török-Duca (born 1959), professional handball player and manager, regarded by some as the greatest Romanian playmaker of all time
- Levente Vajda (born 1981), chess player, Grandmaster
- Szidonia Vajda (born 1979), chess player, with FIDE titles of International Master and Woman Grandmaster
- Lajos Vákár (1910 – 1993), ice hockey player and coach

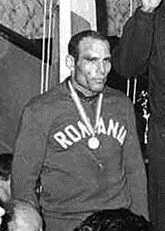
Balla

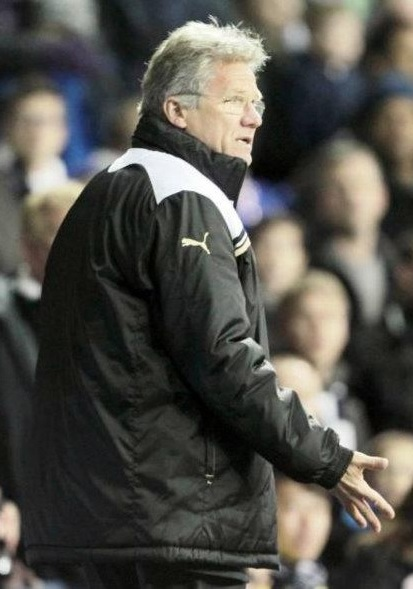
Bölöni

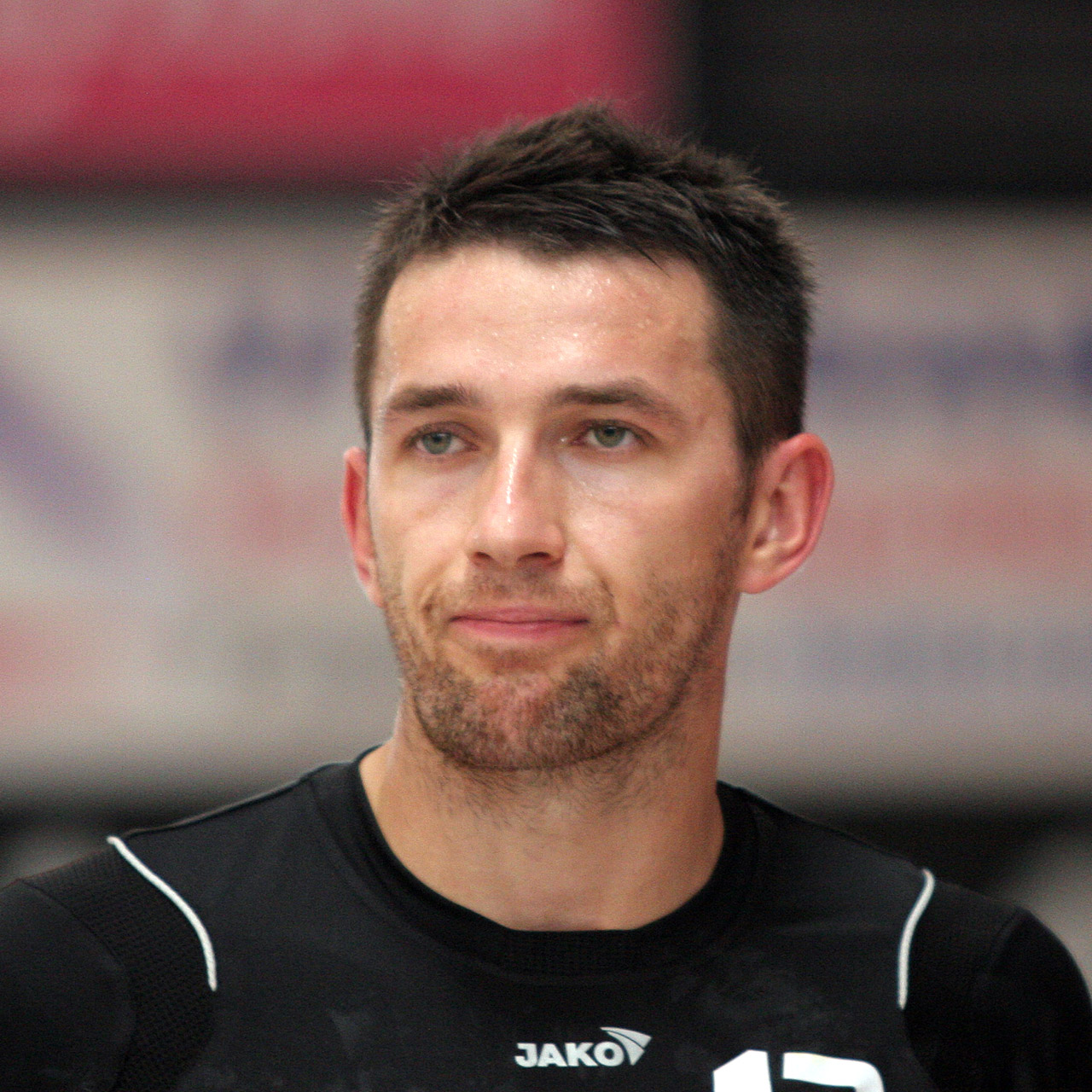
Ilyés

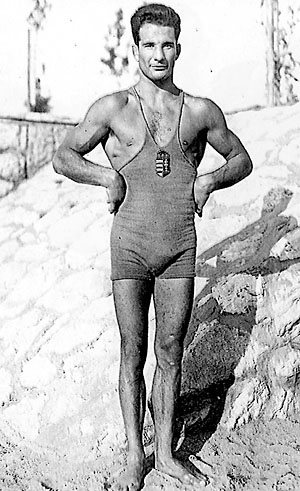
Keresztes

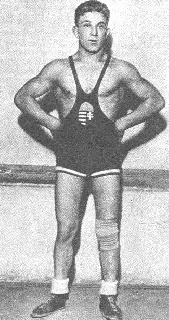
Lőrincz

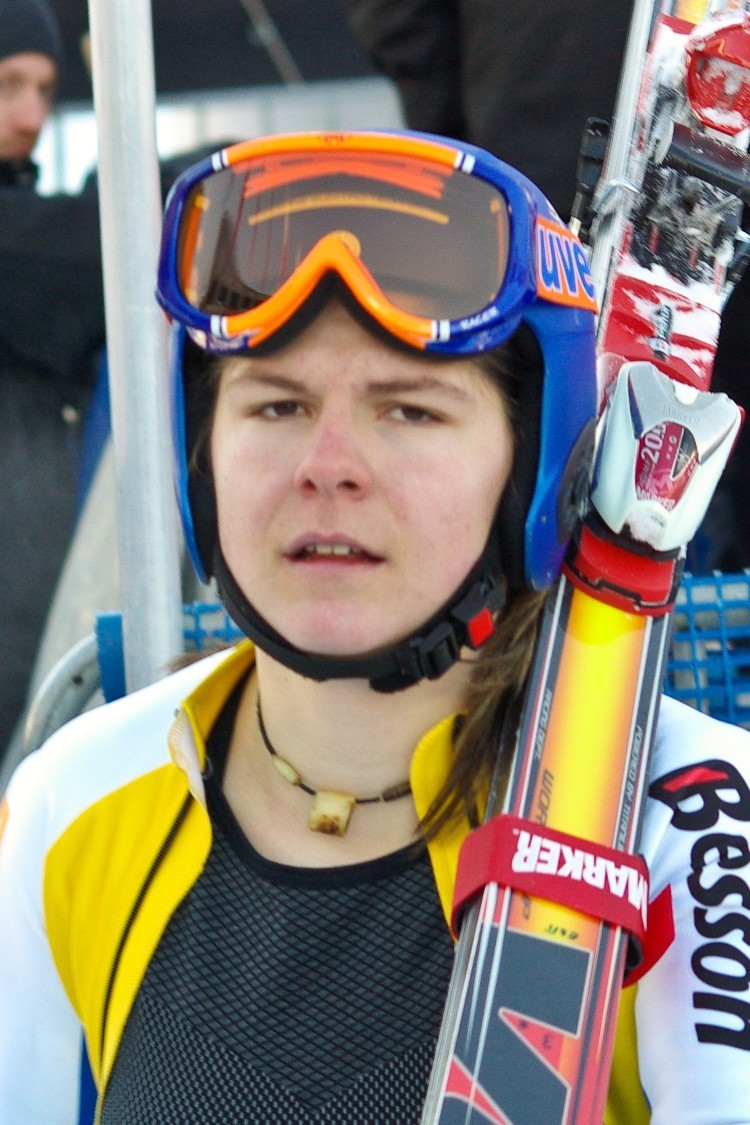
Miklós

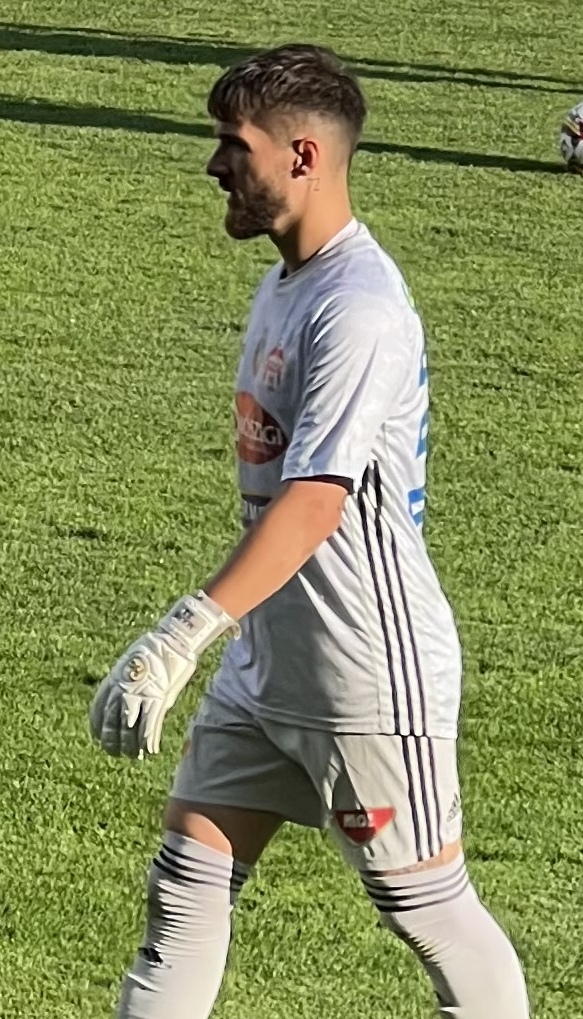
Niczuly

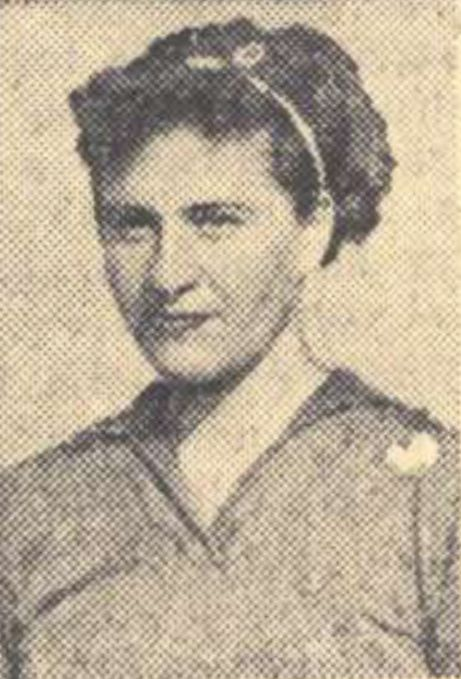
Ștefănescu

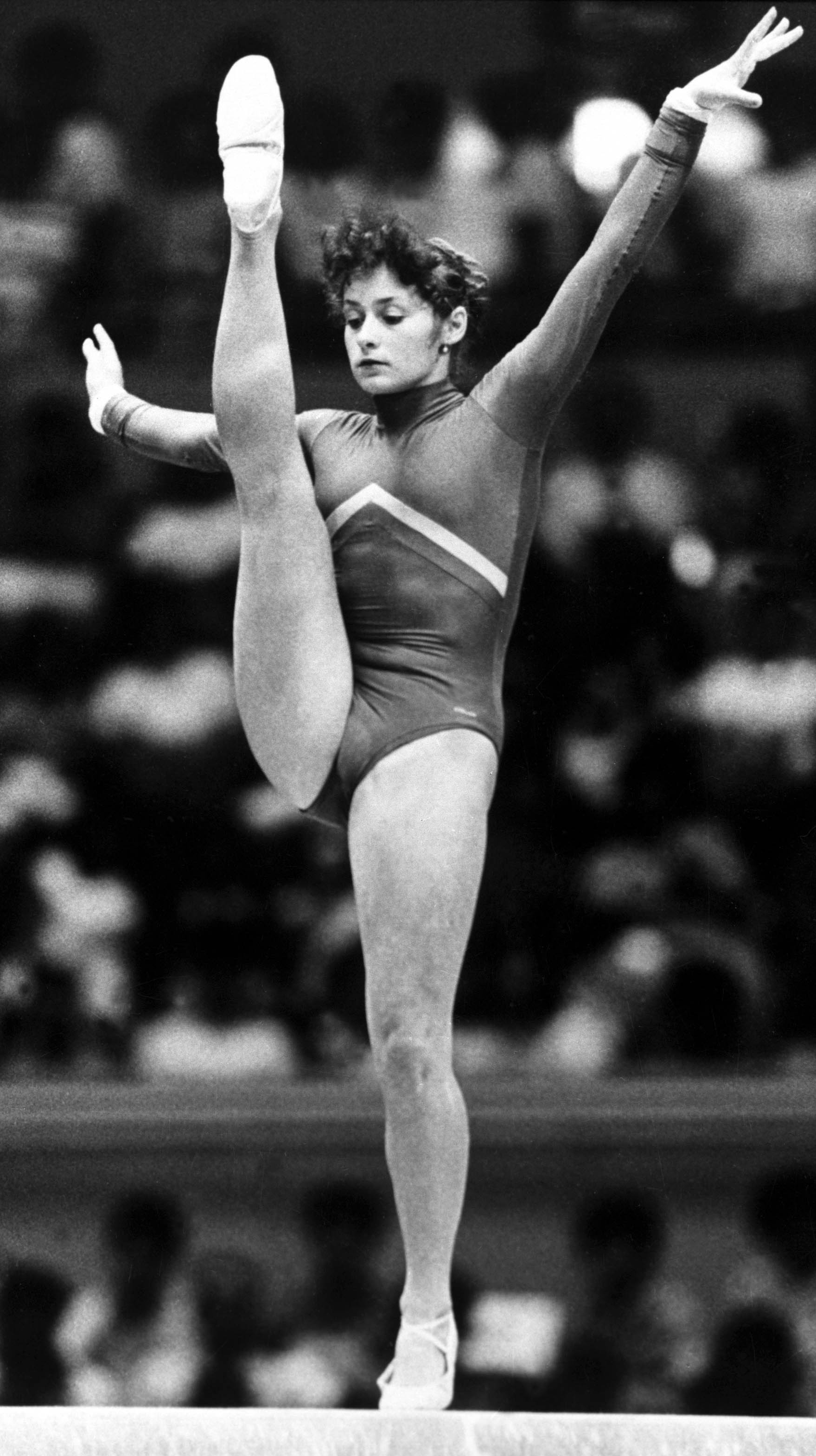
Szabo

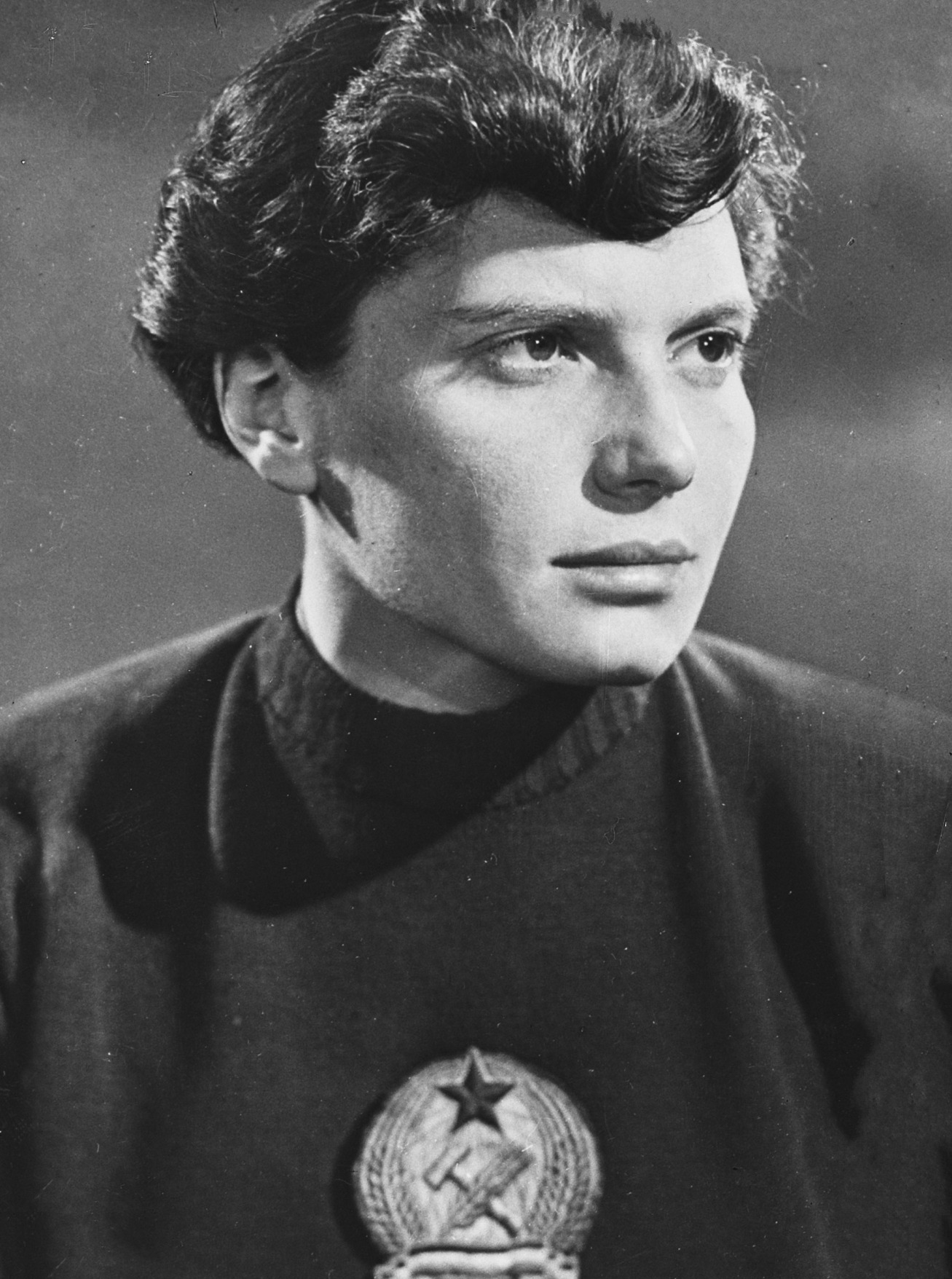
Székely

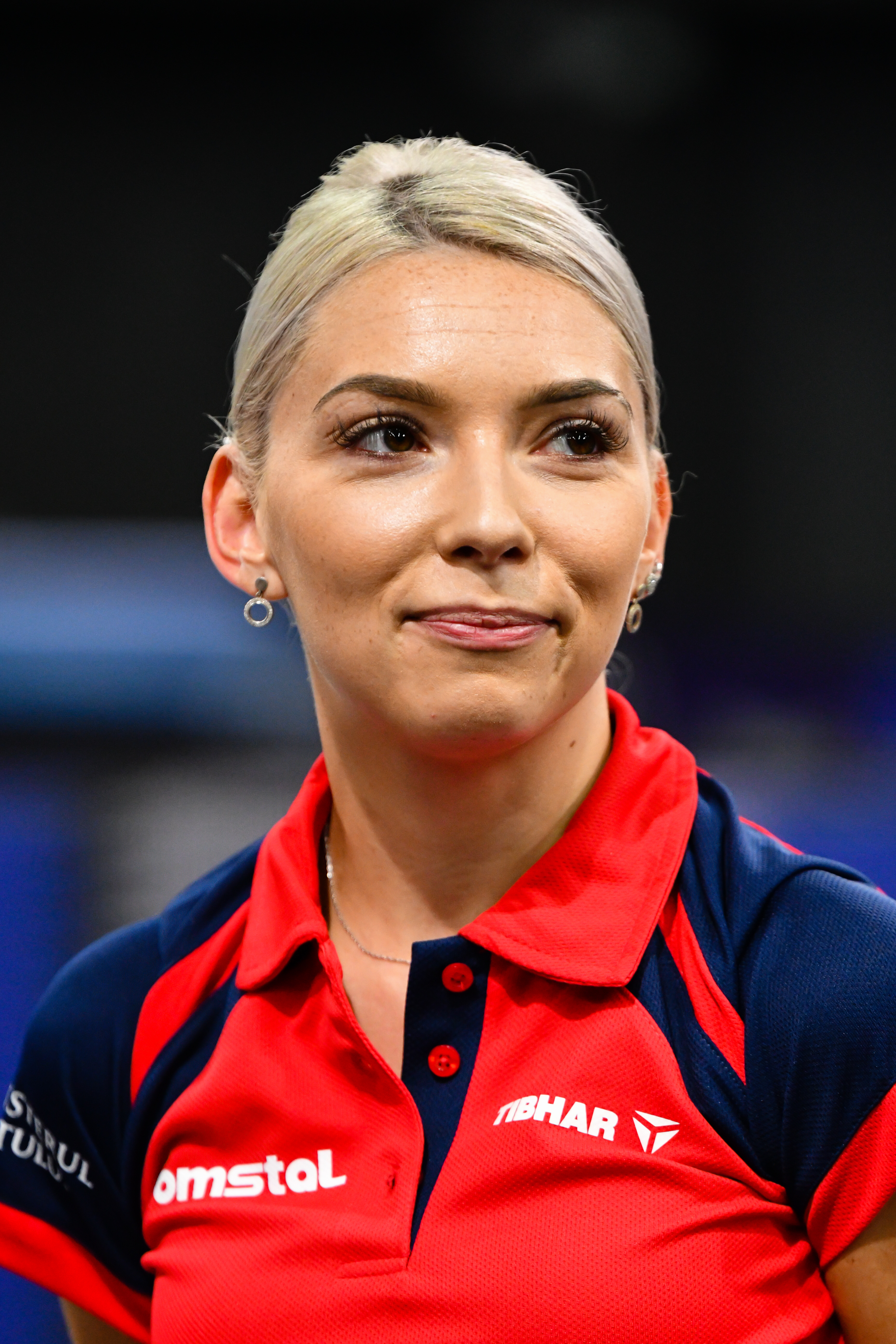
Szőcs

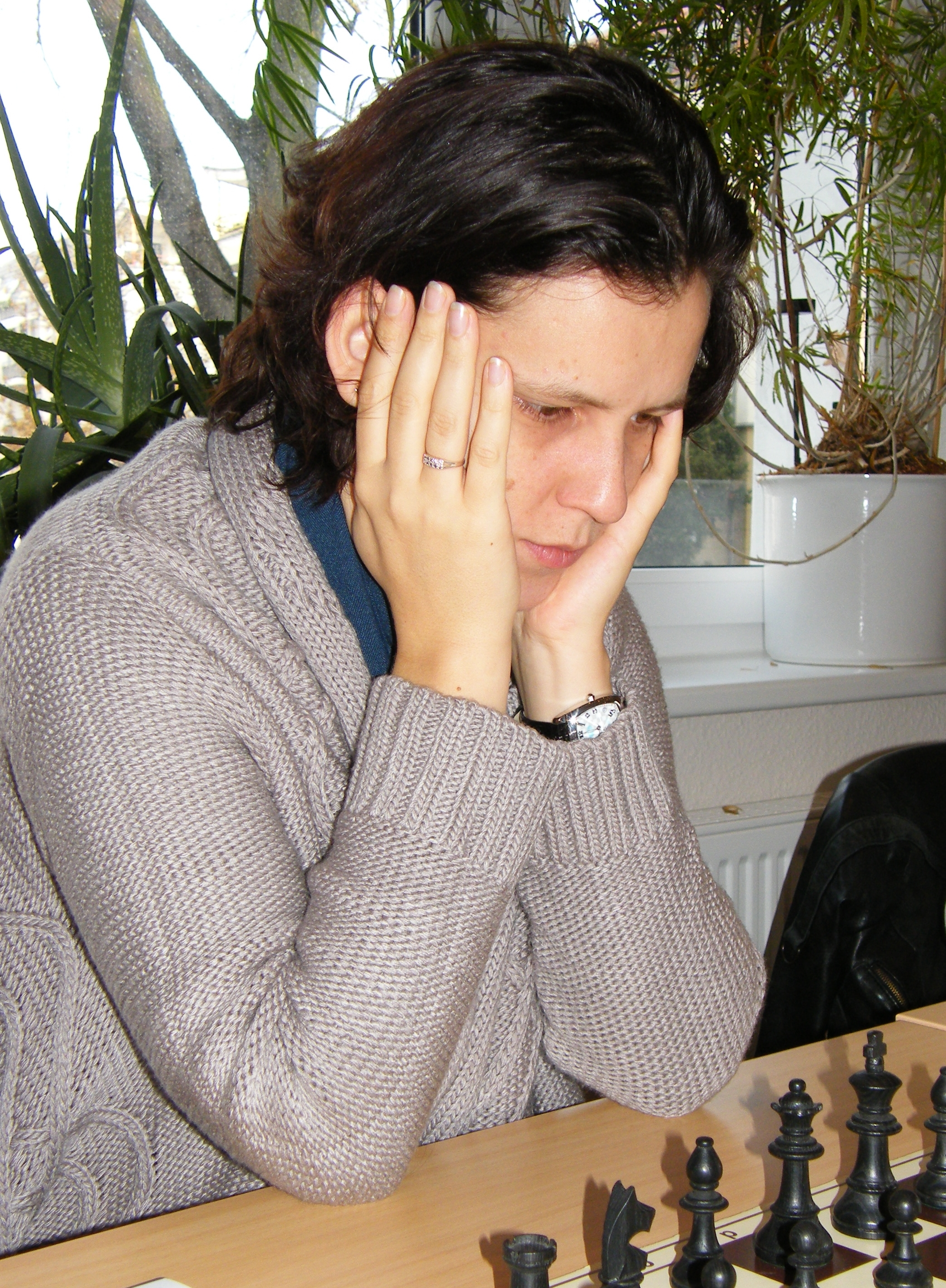
Vajda

== Science and Humanities ==
- János Apáczai Csere (1625 – 1659), polyglot, pedagogist, philosopher and theologian
- Márton Balázs (1929 – 2016), Romanian mathematician of Hungarian descent
- Gábor Bálint – linguist
- Albert-László Barabási (born 1967), Romanian-born Hungarian-American physicist, known for his discoveries in network science and network medicine
- Ákos Birtalan (1962 – 2011), economist and politician
- Péter Bod (1712 – 1768), theologian and historian
- Farkas Bolyai (1775 – 1856), mathematician
- János Bolyai (1802 – 1860), mathematician who developed absolute geometry
- László Borbély (born 1954), economist and politician
- Edmond Bordeaux Szekely (1905 – 1979), philologist, linguist, psychologist
- Sándor Kőrösi Csoma (1784 – 1842), philologist and Orientalist
- Endre Fülei-Szántó (1924 – 1995), linguist, author and professor
- György Frunda (born 1951), jurist and politician
- Erasmus Julius Nyárády (1881 – 1966), botanist
- Tivadar Puskás (1844 – 1893), inventor, telephone pioneer, and inventor of the telephone exchange
- István Szamosközy (1570 – 1612), humanist and historian
- Gyula Vályi (1855 – 1913), mathematician and theoretical physicist
- Attila Verestóy (1954 – 2018), chemical engineer and politician

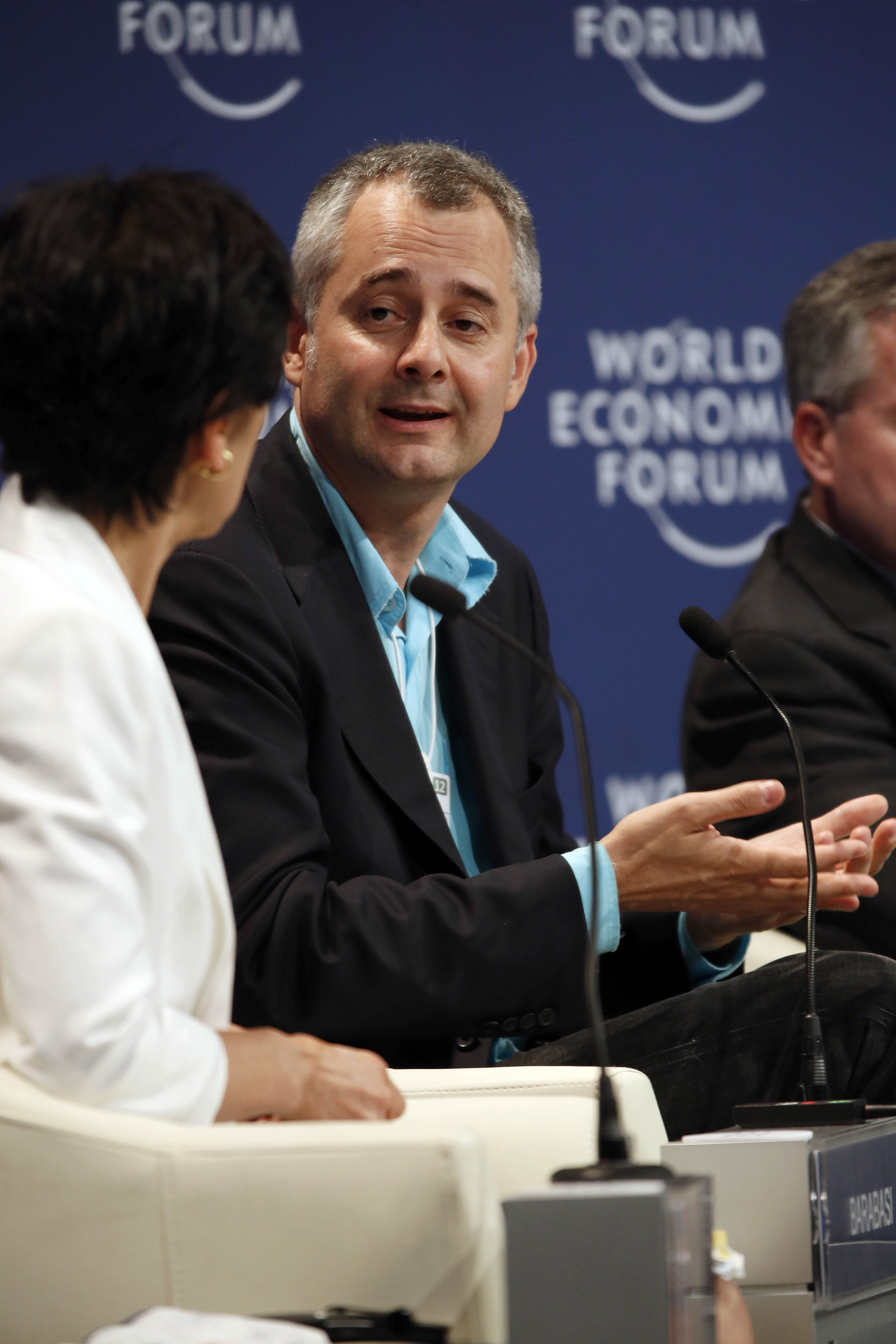
Barabási

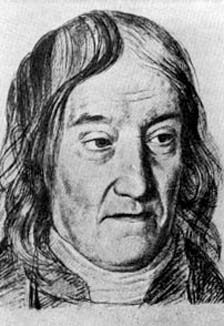
Farkas Bolyai

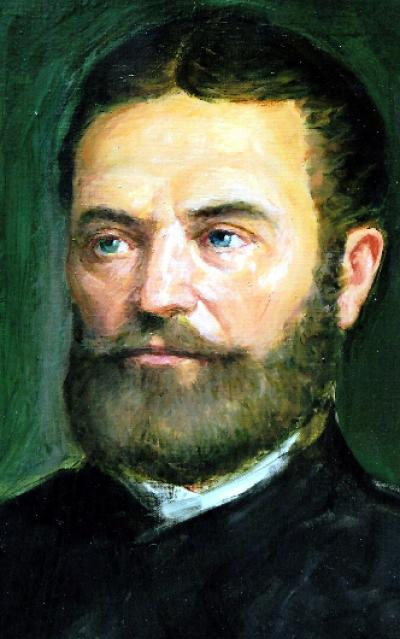
János Bolyai

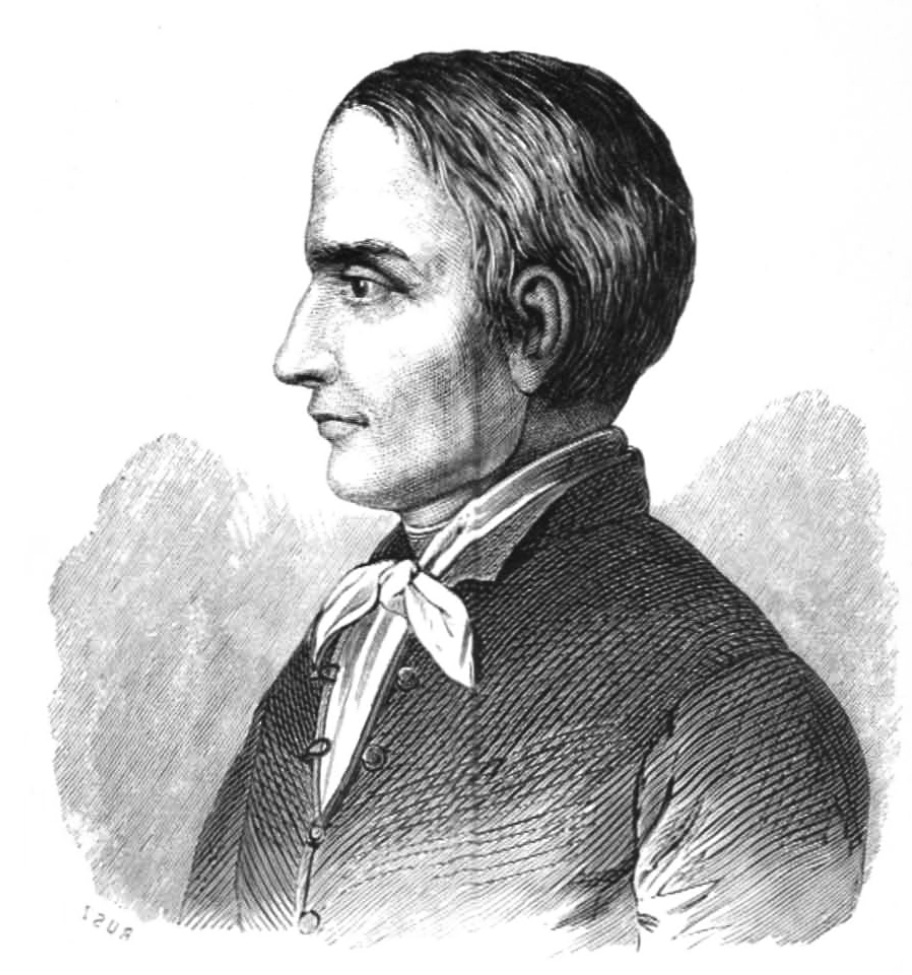
Csoma

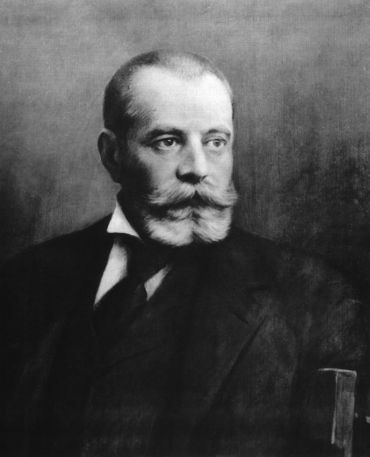
Puskás

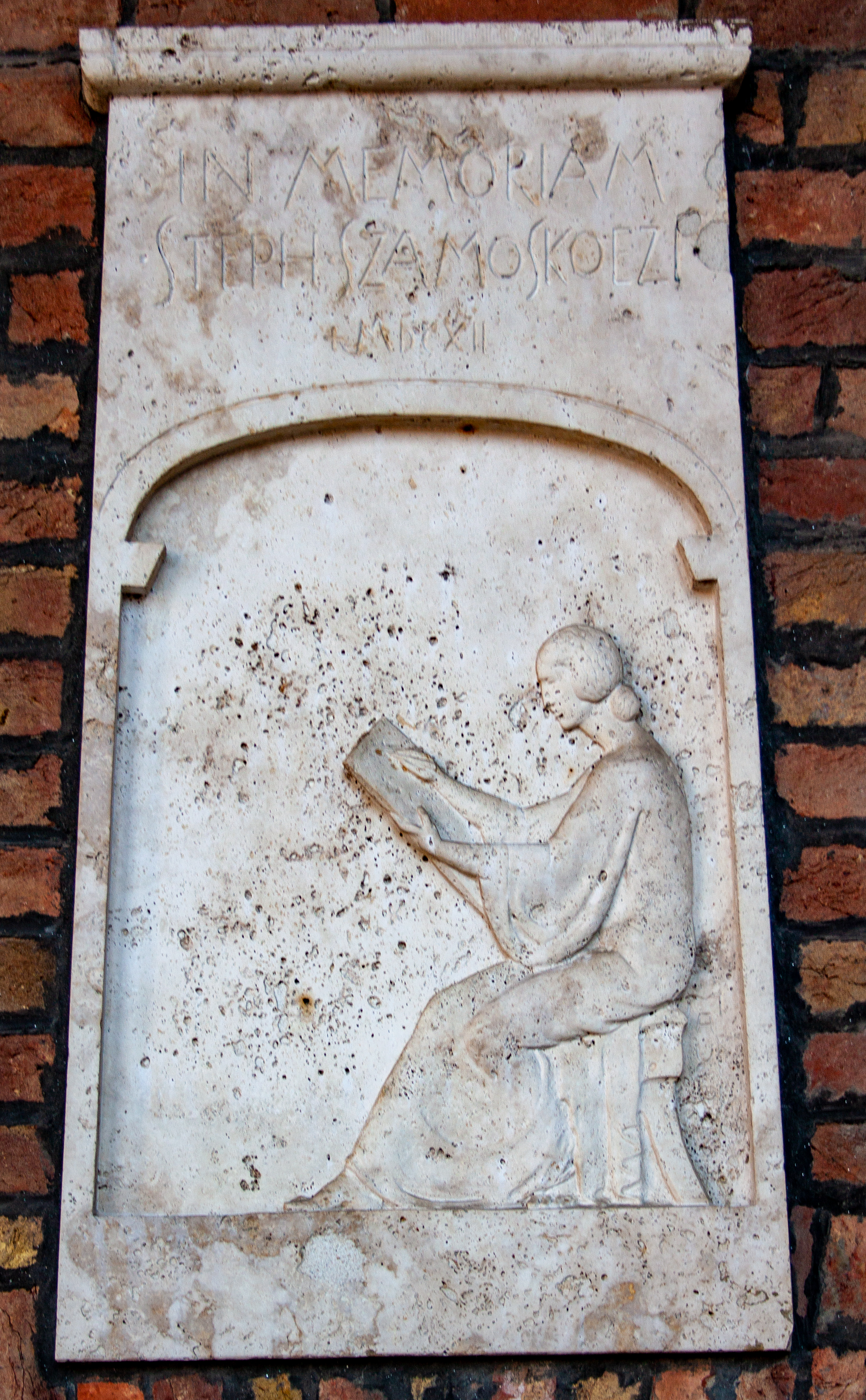
Szamosközy

== Musicians ==
- Bíborka Bocskor (born 1982), singer and songwriter
- Boldizsár Csiky (born 1937), composer
- Annamari Dancs (born 1981), singer
- János Koós (1937 – 2019), pop singer
- Kálmán Mihalik (1896 – 1922), physician and composer, set the music for Székely himnusz
- Imre Palló (1891 – 1978), baritone, opera house manager
- Anne Roselle (1894 – 1989), opera singer and actress

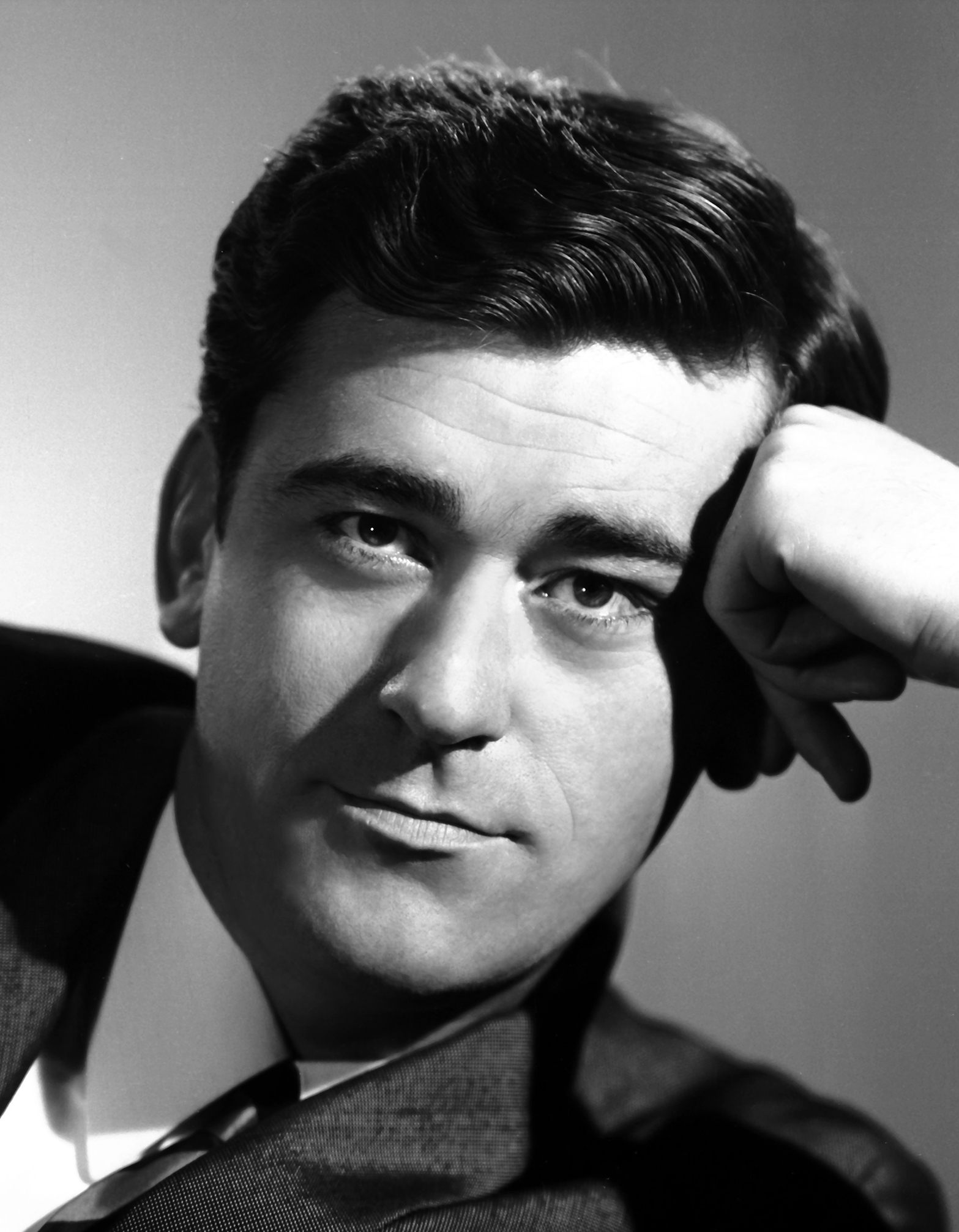
Koós

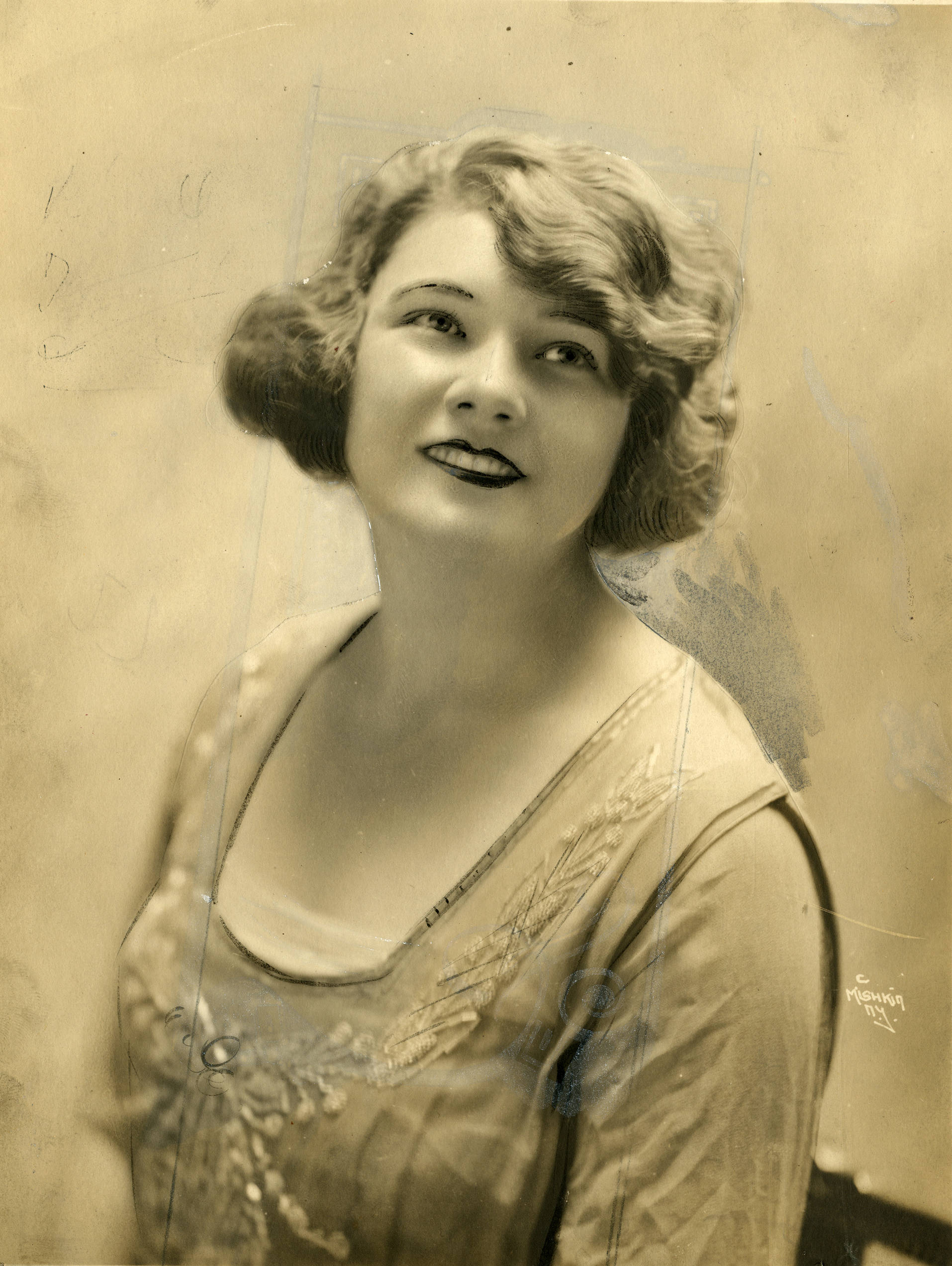
Roselle

== Artists ==
- Miklós Barabás (1810 – 1898), painter
- Attila Bartis (born 1968), writer, photographer, dramatist and journalist
- André de Dienes (1913 – 1985), photographer, noted for his work with Marilyn Monroe
- Manyi Kiss (1911 – 1971), theater and film actress
- Róza Laborfalvi (1817 – 1886), theater actress, noblewoman
- Louis C.K. (born 1967 as Louis Székely), American comedian of Hungarian origin
- Ferenc Márton (1884 – 1940), painter
- János Mattis-Teutsch (1884 – 1960), painter, sculptor, graphic artist, art critic and poet, father of Székely origins
- Imre Nagy (1893 – 1976), painter
- István Nagy (1873 – 1937), artist who specialized in landscapes and figure painting
- Bertalan Székely (1835 – 1910), history and portrait painter
- Gábor Tompa (born 1957), theater and film director

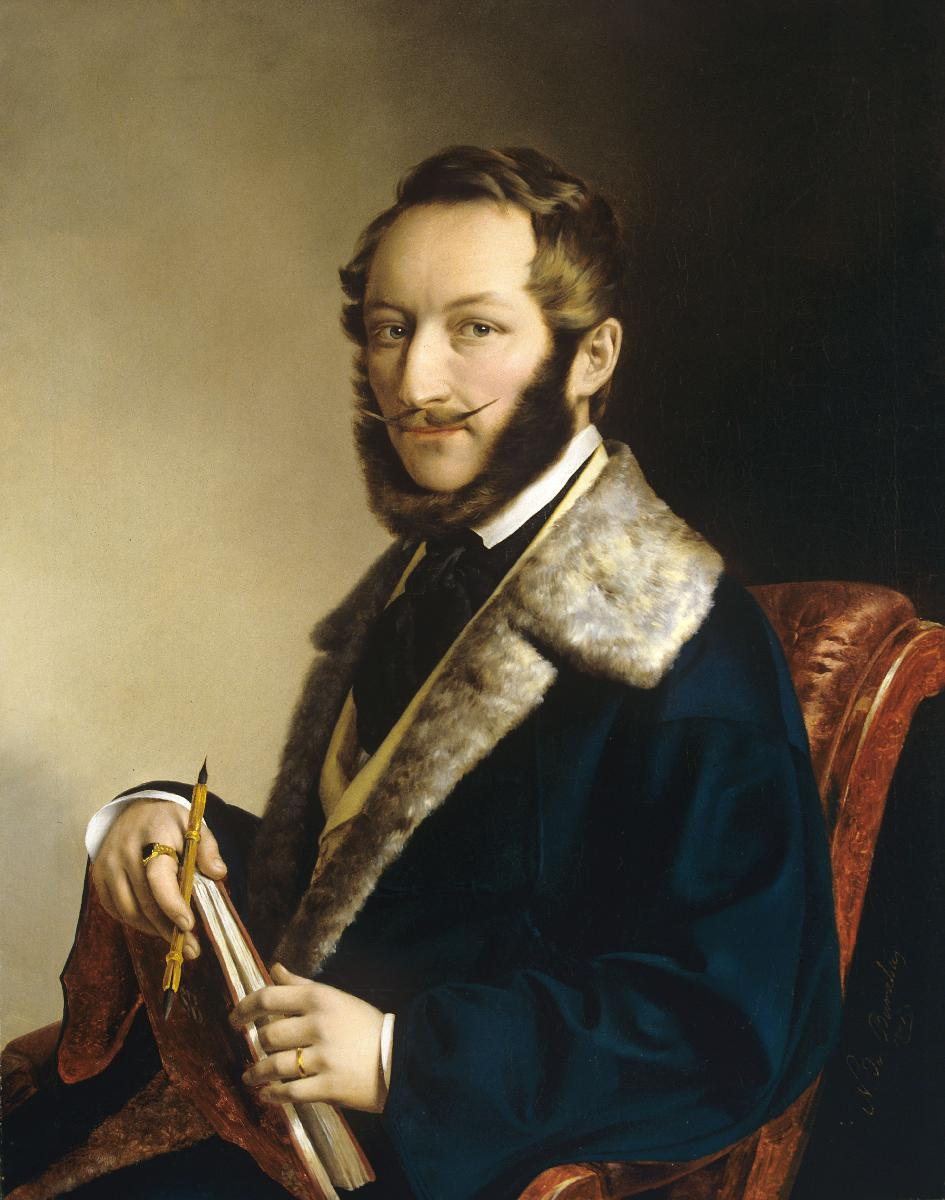
Barabás

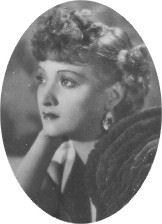
Kiss

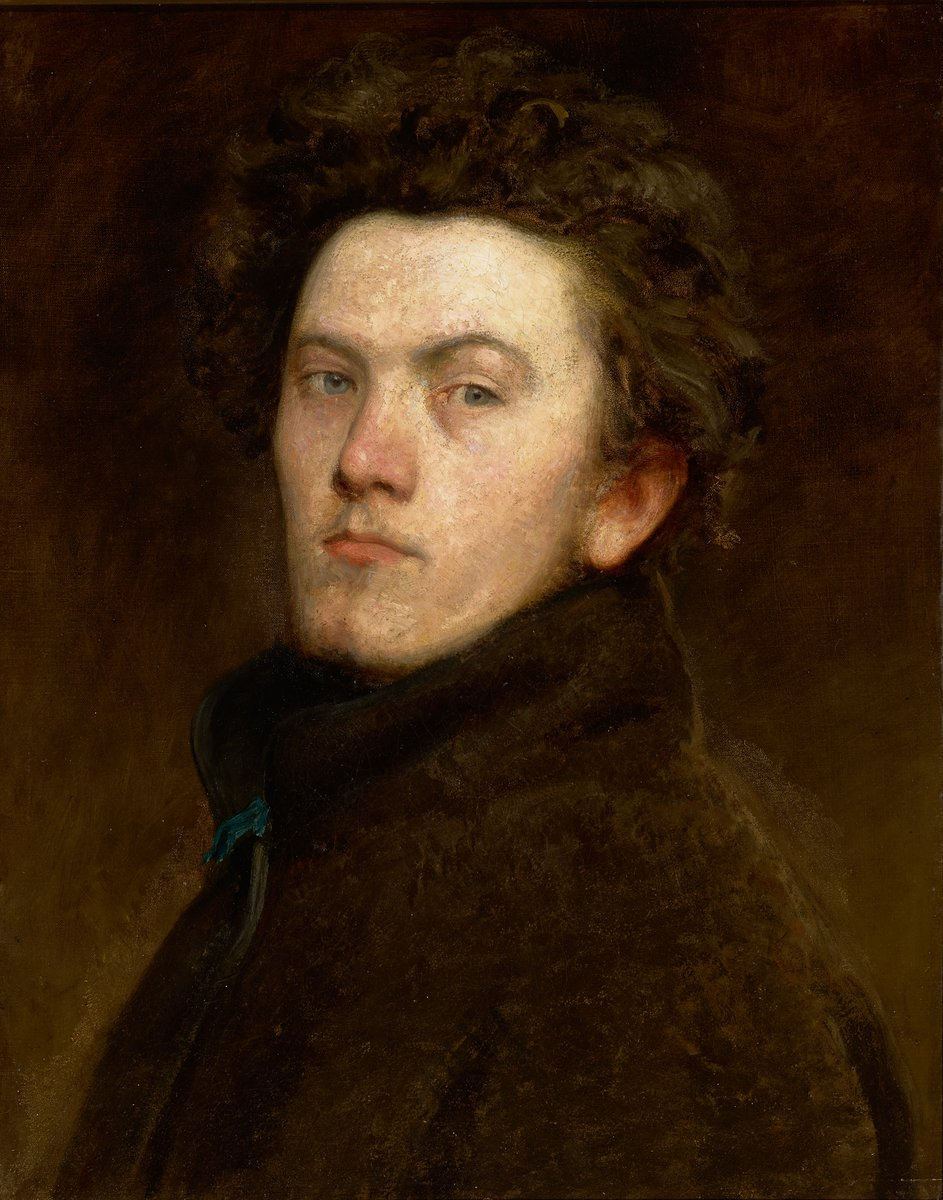
Székely

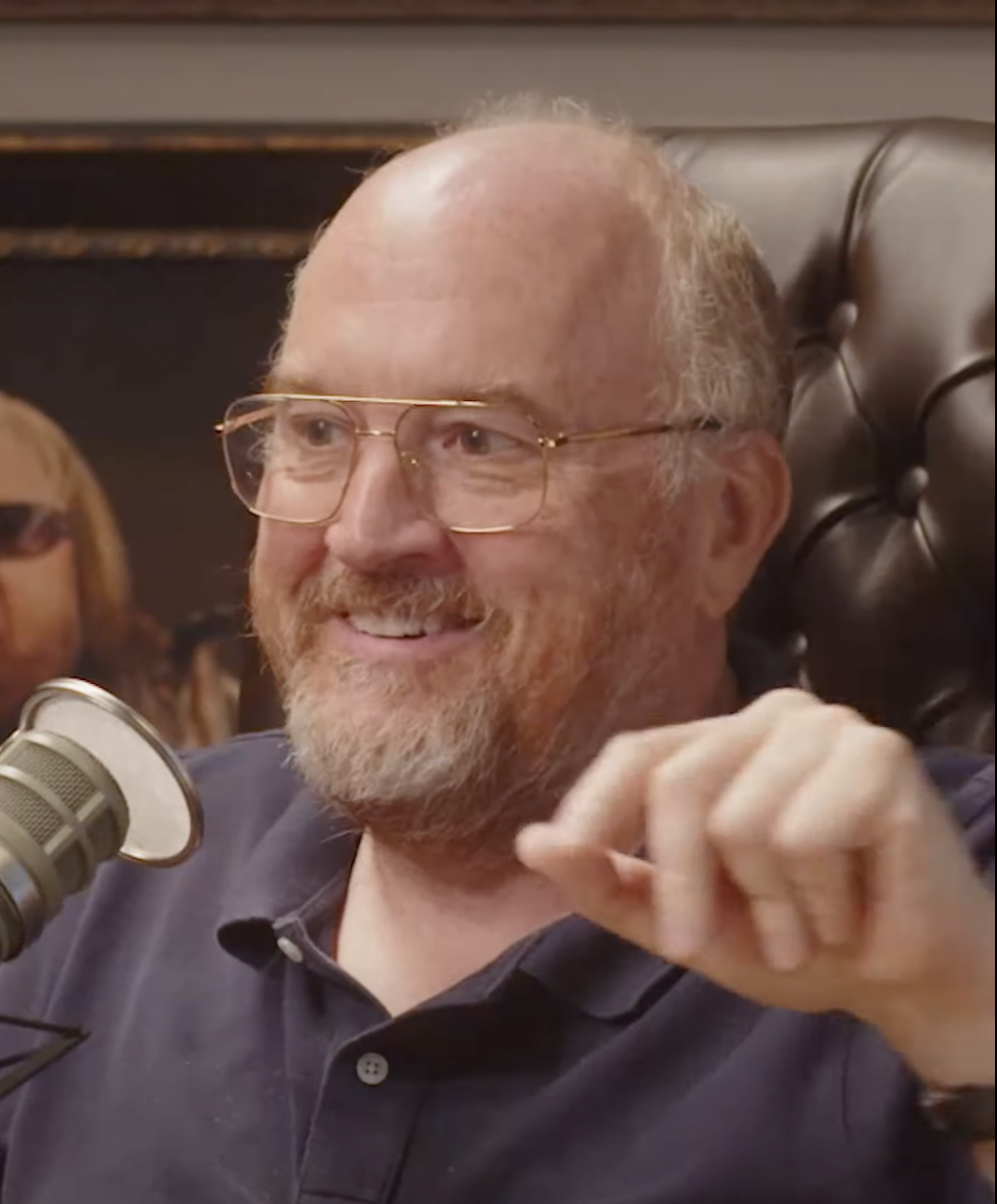
C.K.

== Writers ==
- Gloria Álvarez (born 1985), radio and television presenter, author, and libertarian political commentator, mother of Székely origin
- Olga Bede (1908 – 1925), writer
- Elek Benedek (1859 – 1929), journalist and writer
- Domokos Bölöni (born 1946), writer and journalist
- György Csanády (1895 – 1952), poet, journalist and radio director, the author of Székely himnusz
- György Dragomán (born 1973), author and translator
- György Enyedi (1555 – 1597), Unitarian bishop, moderator, and writer
- Sándor Bölöni Farkas (1795 – 1842), writer
- Attila György (born 1971), writer, journalist, literary editor
- Sándor Kányádi (1929 – 2018), poet and translator, one of the most famous and beloved Hungarian poets in his lifetime
- Kelemen Mikes (1690 – 1761), political figure and essayist
- József Nyírő (1889 – 1953), writer of popular short stories and novels
- Balázs Orbán (1829 – 1890), author, ethnographic collector, parliamentarian, correspondent member of the Hungarian Academy of Sciences
- Erno Polgar (1954 – 2018), writer, nominated for the Nobel Prize in Literature in 2017
- Dávid Baróti Szabó (1739 – 1819), poet, linguist, Jesuit priest and teacher
- Géza Szőcs (1953 – 2020), poet and politician
- Áron Tamási (1897 – 1966), Hungarian writer, famous for his stories written in original Székely style

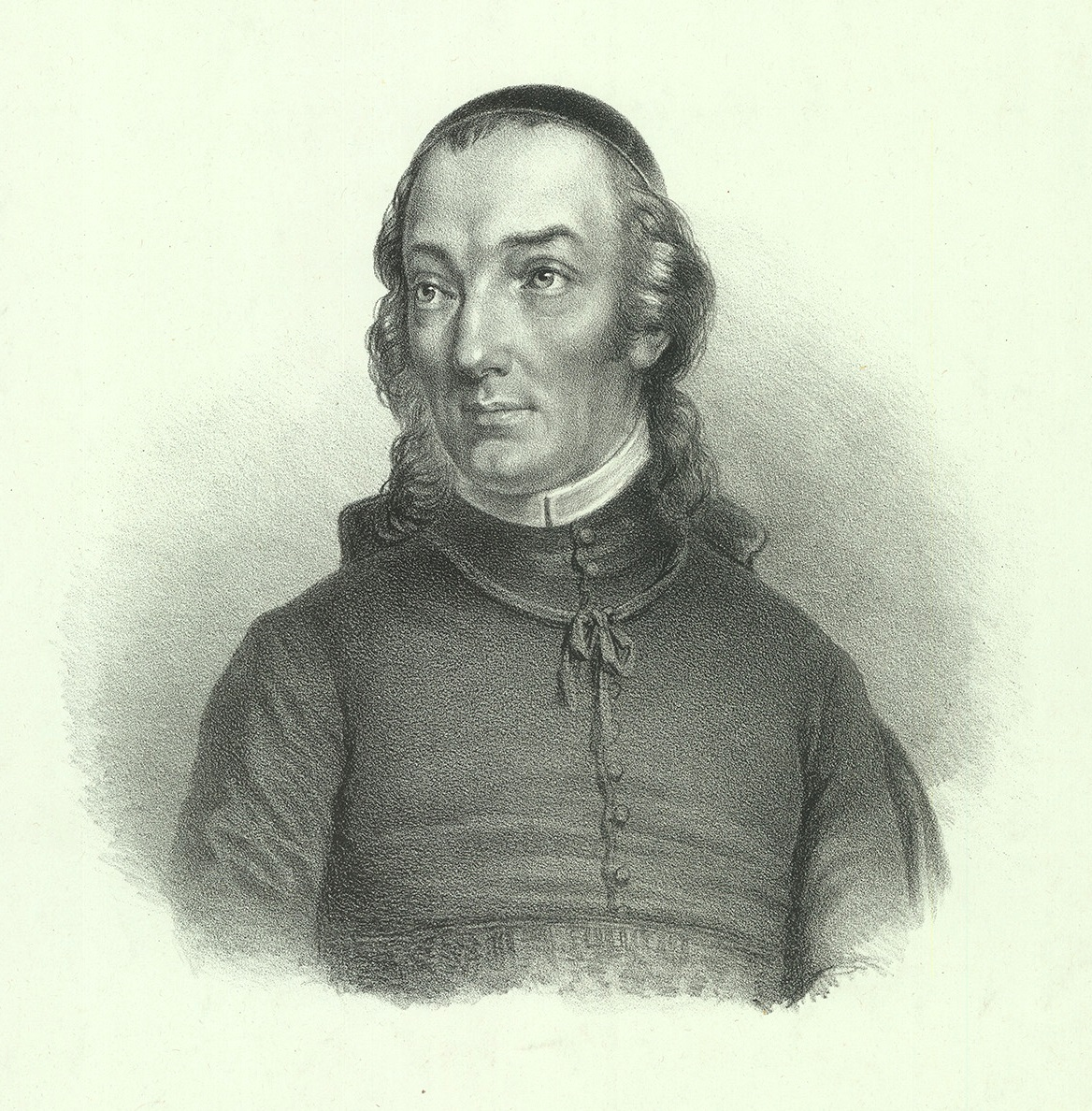
Baróti Szabó

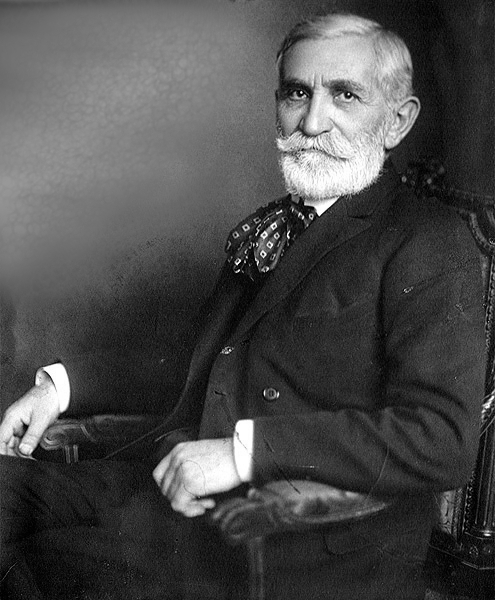
Benedek

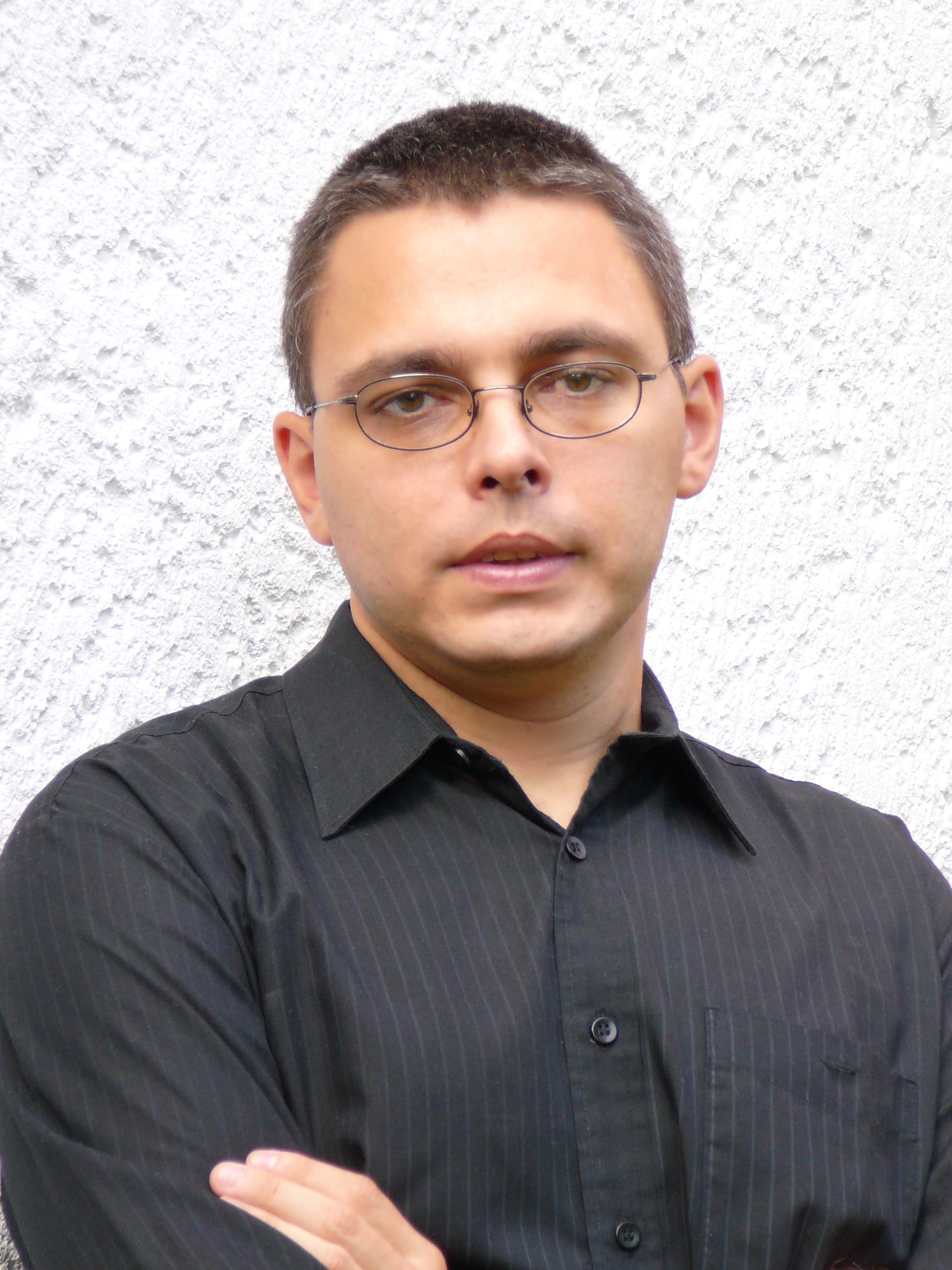
Dragomán

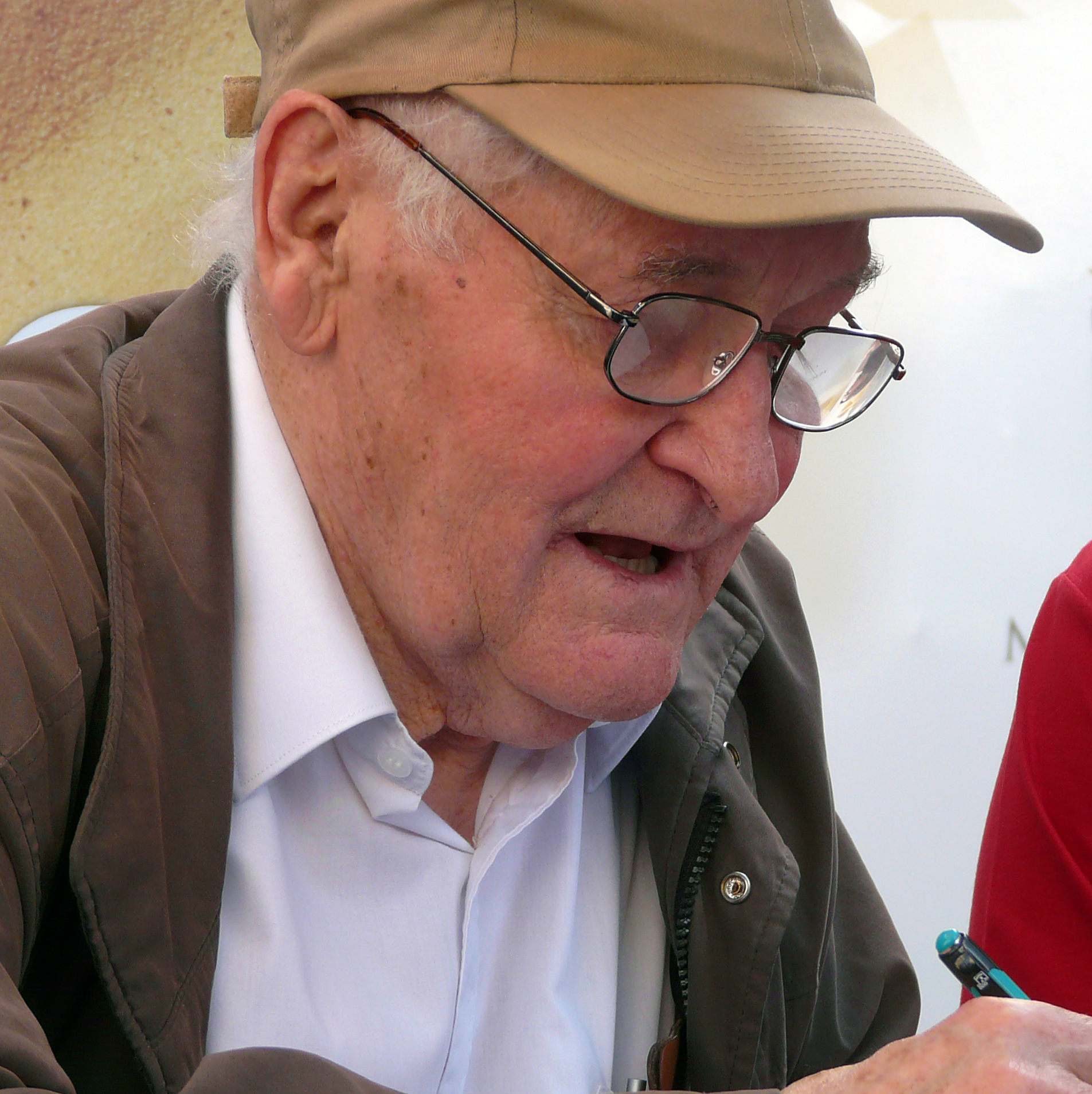
Kányádi

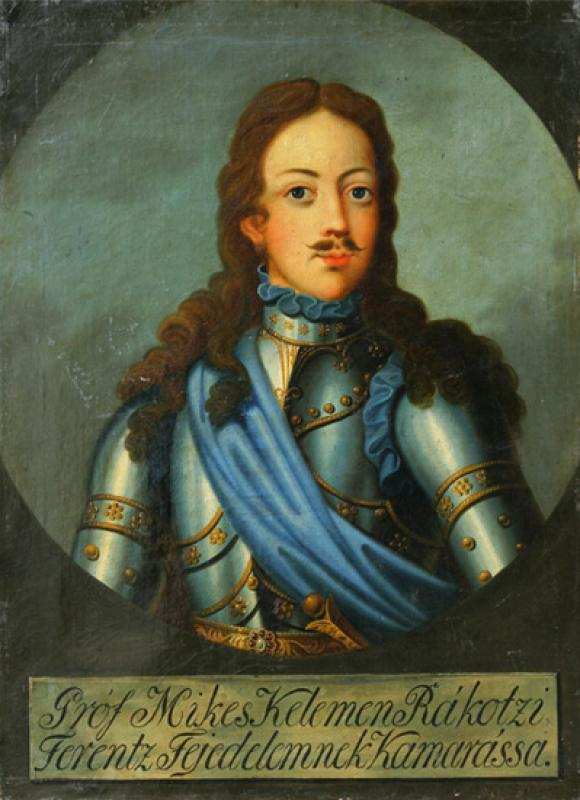
Mikes

== Military ==
- János Czetz (1822 – 1904), military commander
- György Dózsa (1470 – 1514), man-at-arms
- Áron Gábor (1814 – 1849), artillery officer
- Albert Király (fl. 1595), military leader
- Vilmos Nagy de Nagybaczon (1884 – 1976), commanding general of the Royal Hungarian Army, Hungarian Minister of Defense, military theorist and historian
- Moses Székely (c. 1553 – 1603), nobleman and military leader

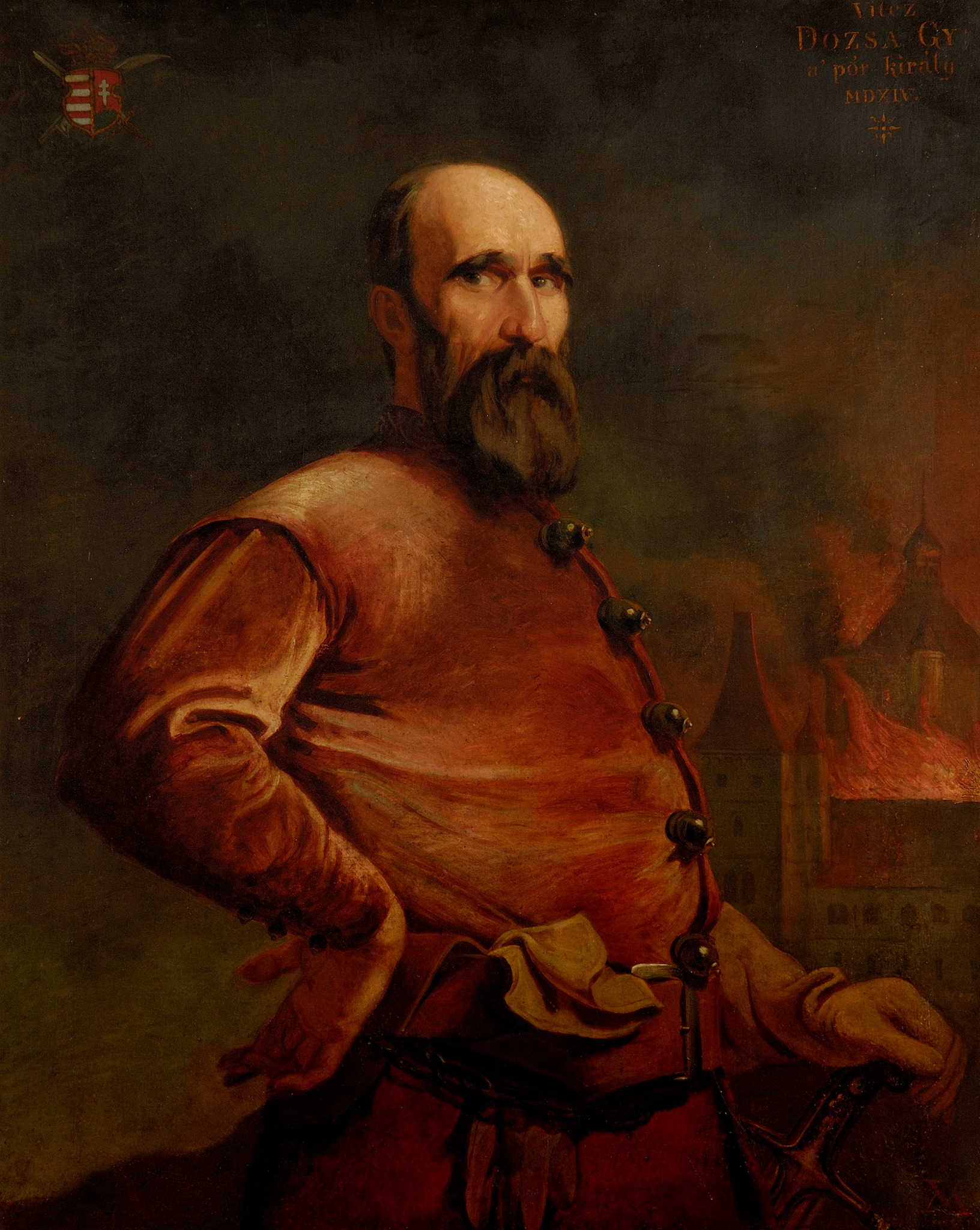
Dózsa

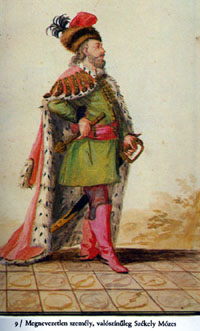
Székely

== Politicians ==
- József Dudás (1912 – 1957), politician and resistance fighter
- Sámuel Kálnoky (1640 – 1706), Chancellor of Transylvania
- Attila Kelemen (1948 – 2022), Romanian politician and Member of the European Parliament
- Hunor Kelemen (born 1967), politician and writer
- Károly Király (1930 – 2021), politician
- Elek Köblös (1887 – 1938), activist and political leader
- Vasile Luca (1898 – 1963), Austro-Hungarian-born Romanian and Soviet politician of Székely origin
- Béla Markó (born 1951), Romanian politician
- Imre Mikó (1805 – 1876), statesman, politician, economist, historian and patron
- Zsolt Nagy (born 1971), Romanian politician of Hungarian ethnicity
- László Rajk (1909 – 1949), politician, Hungarian Minister of Interior and Minister of Foreign Affairs
- Barna Tánczos (born 1976), politician
- Lóránt Vincze (born 1977), politician

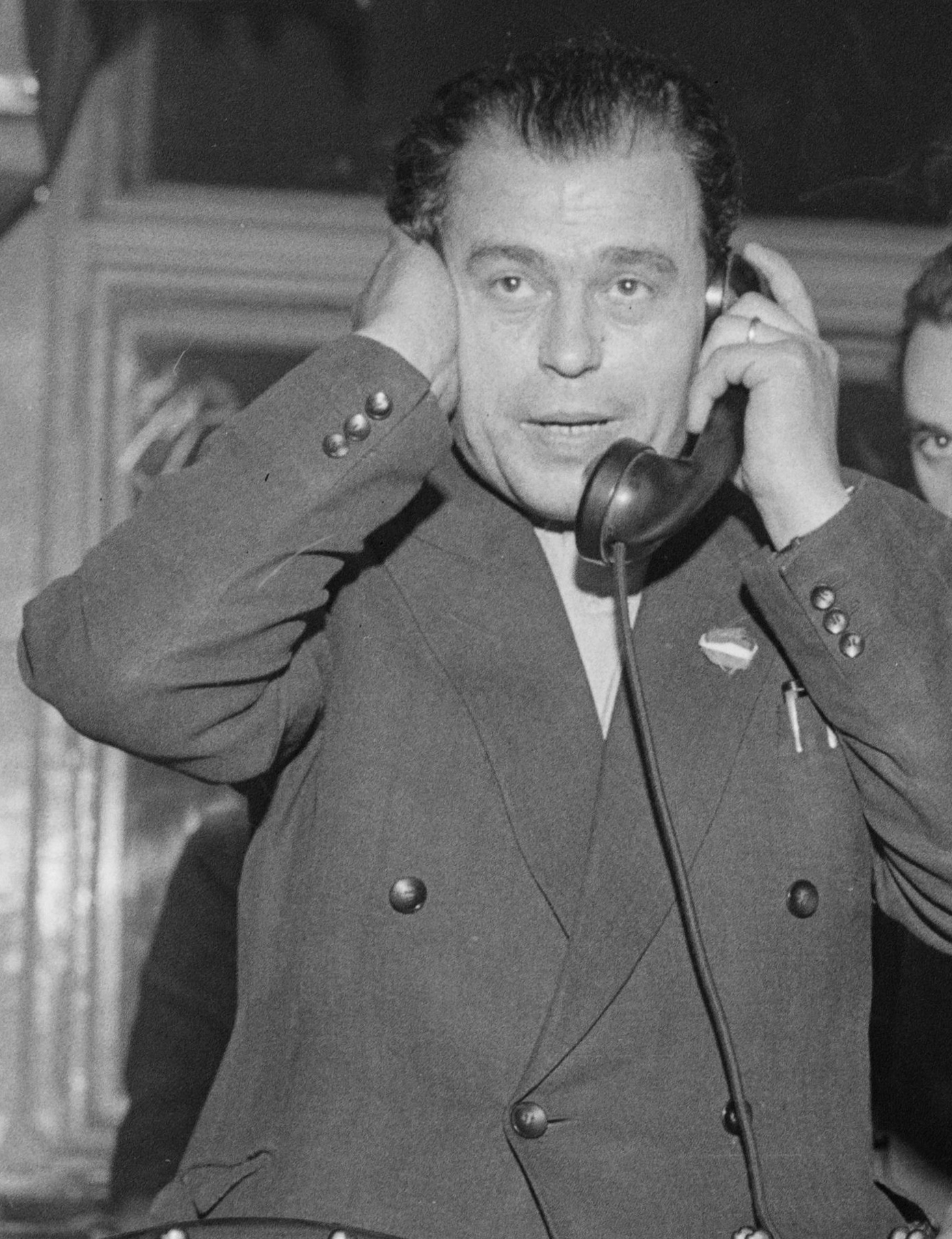
Dudás

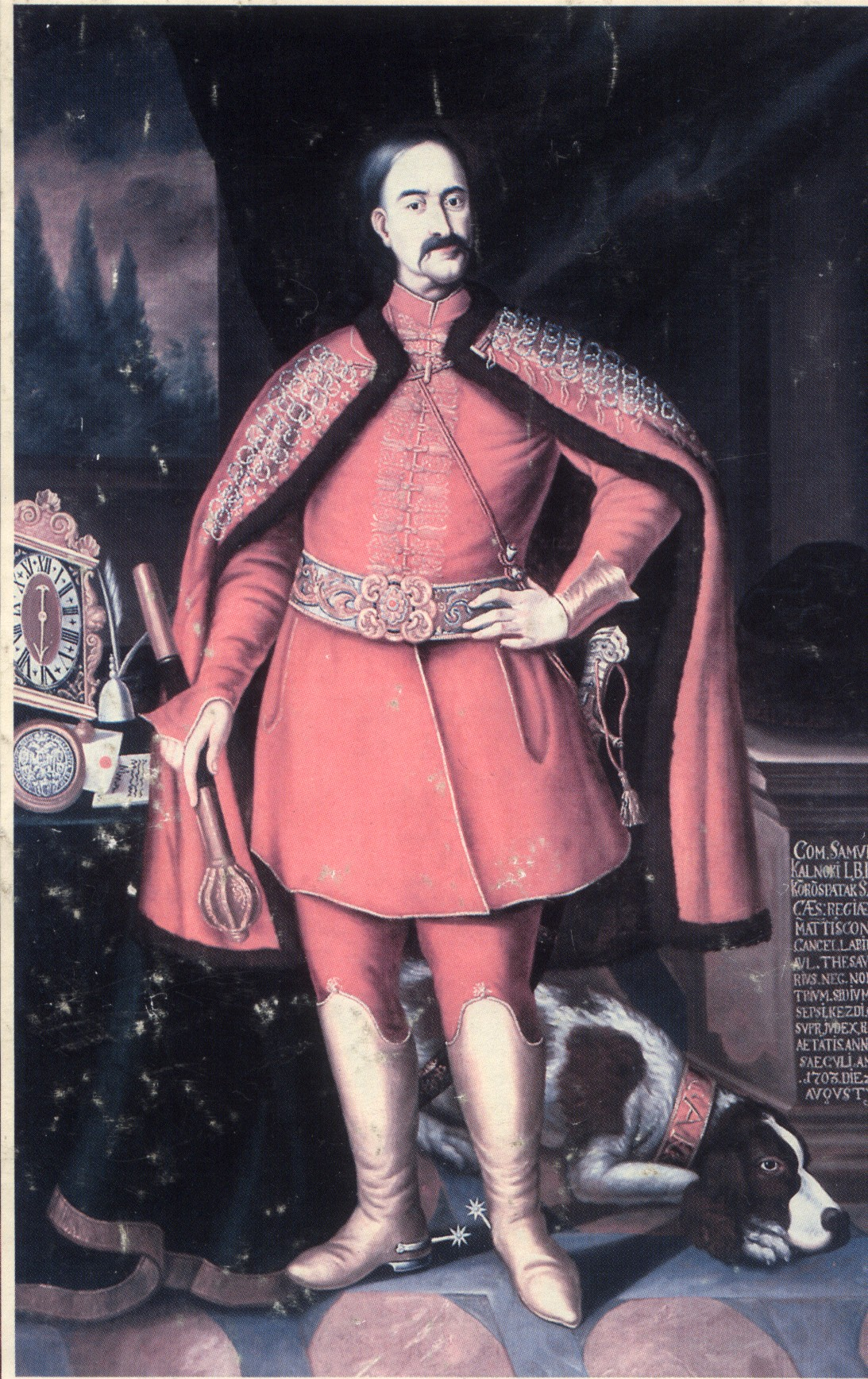
Kálnoky

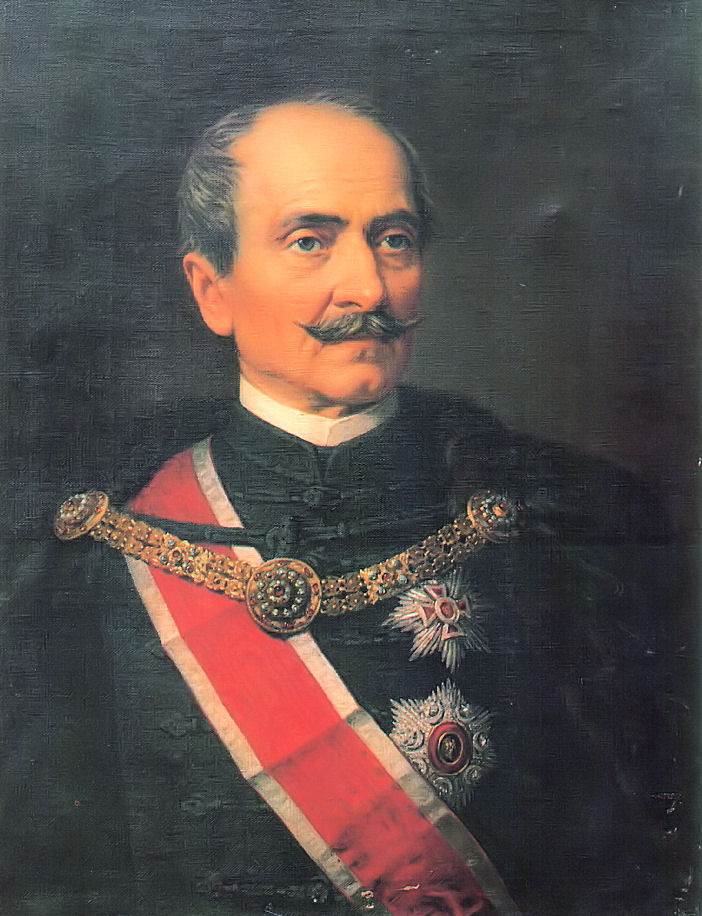
Mikó

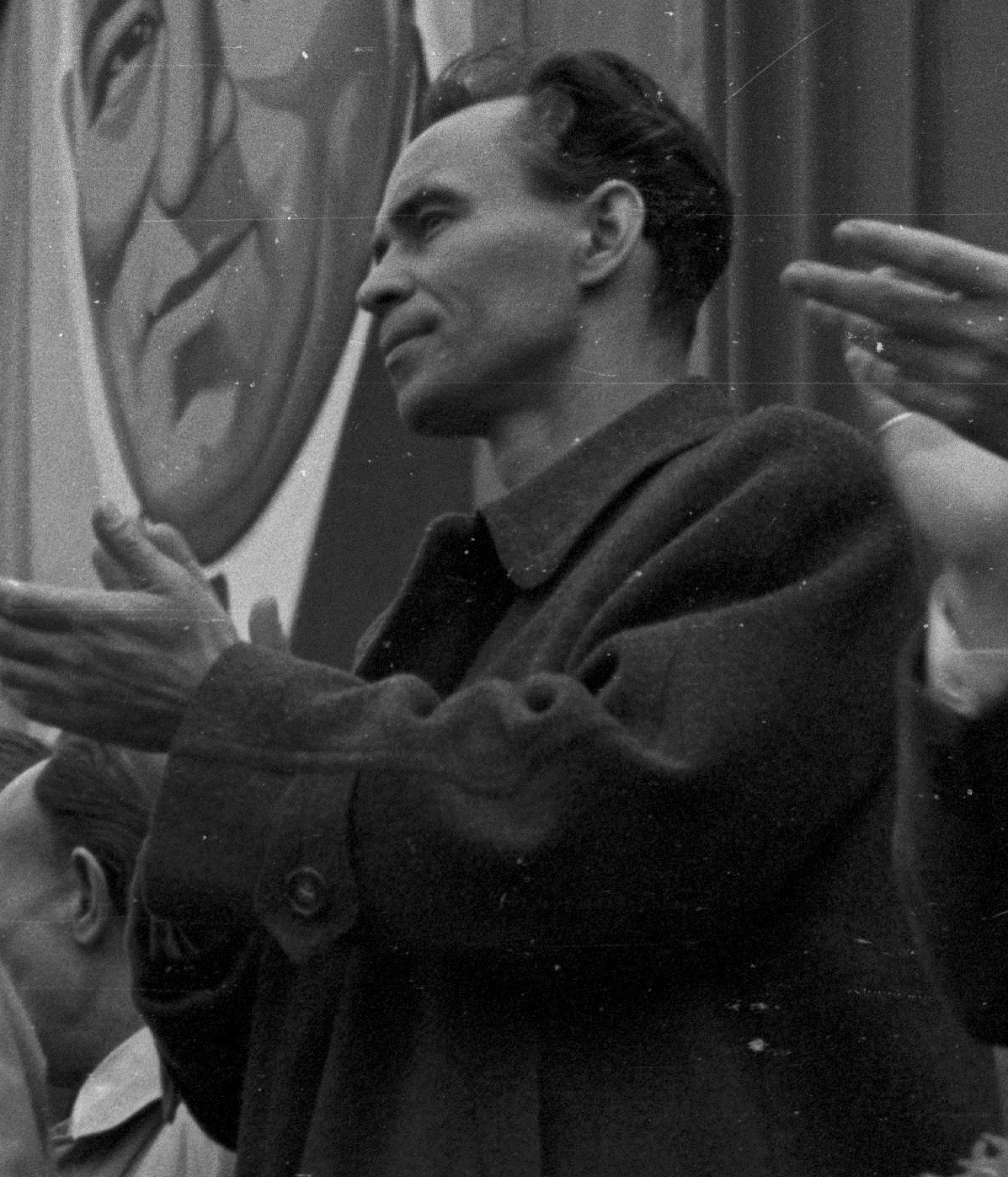
Rajk

== Other ==
- Attila Ambrus (born 1967), bank robber
- Florence Baker (1841 – 1916), explorer
- Zoltán Dani (born 1956), Yugoslav army officer, father of Székely origin
- Sándor Demján (1943 – 2018), businessman, entrepreneur, the second richest person in Hungary according to Forbes
- Gergely Kovács (born 1968), archbishop of the Archdiocese of Alba Iulia.
- Áron Márton (1896 – 1980), Roman Catholic prelate, Bishop of Alba Iulia
- Moses Székely the Younger (1603 – c. 1658), nobleman, Prince of Transylvania
- Dezső Varga (born 1939), Romanian ice hockey player

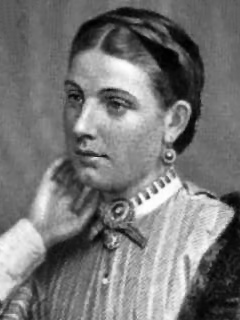
Baker

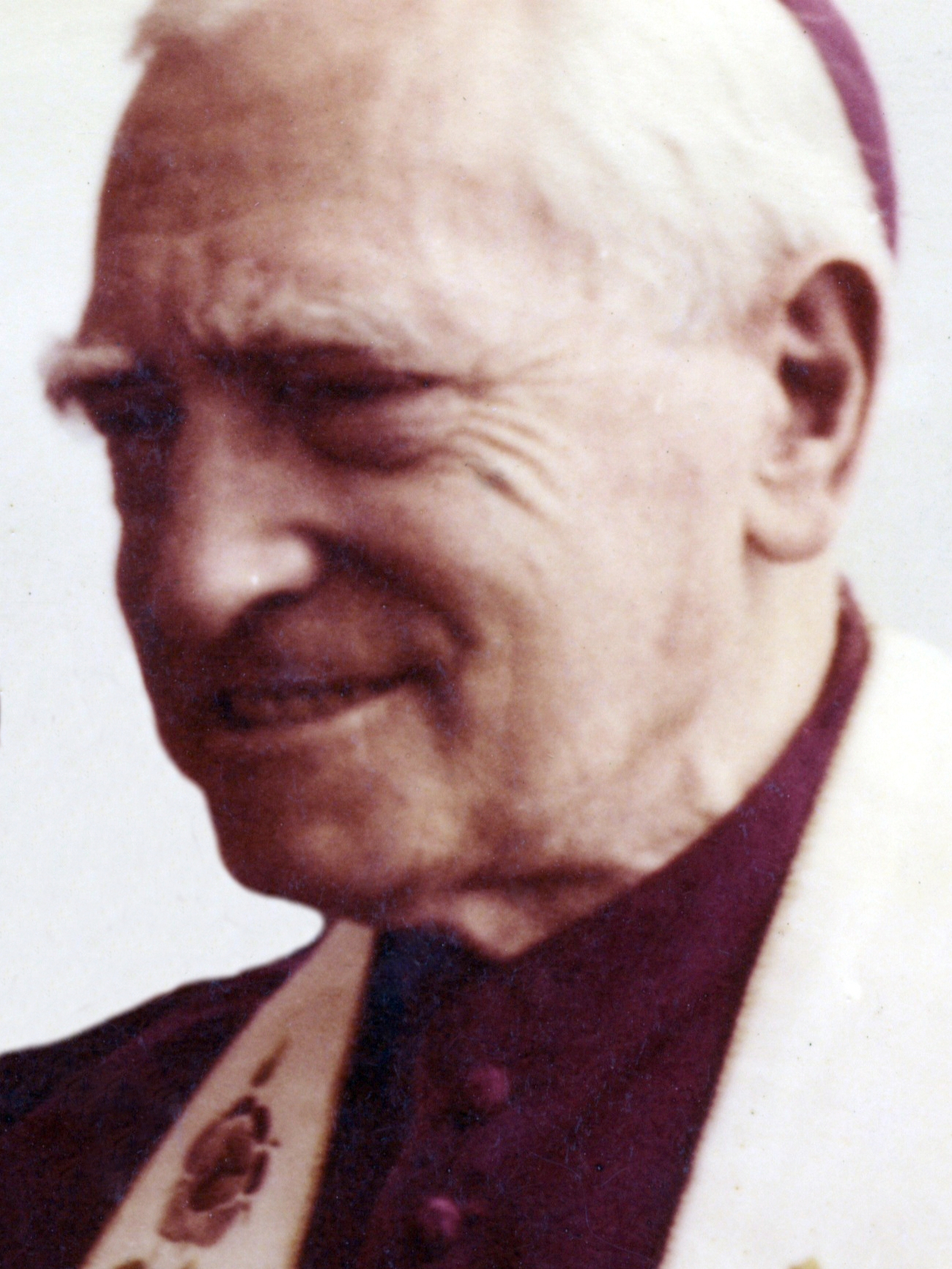
Márton

== See also ==
- List of Hungarians
