= Odorheiu Secuiesc =

Odorheiu Secuiesc Székelyudvarhely
- Municipality
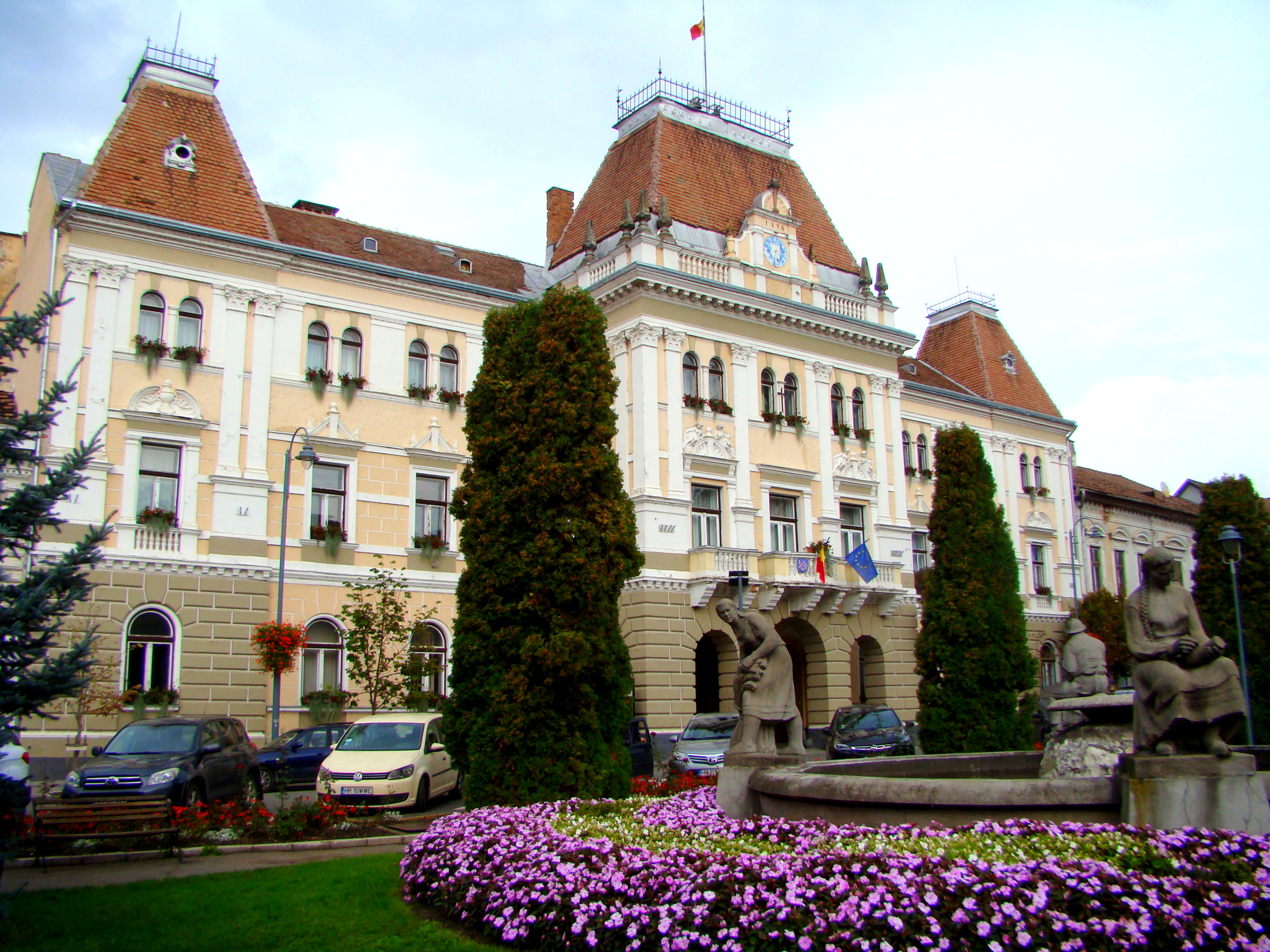
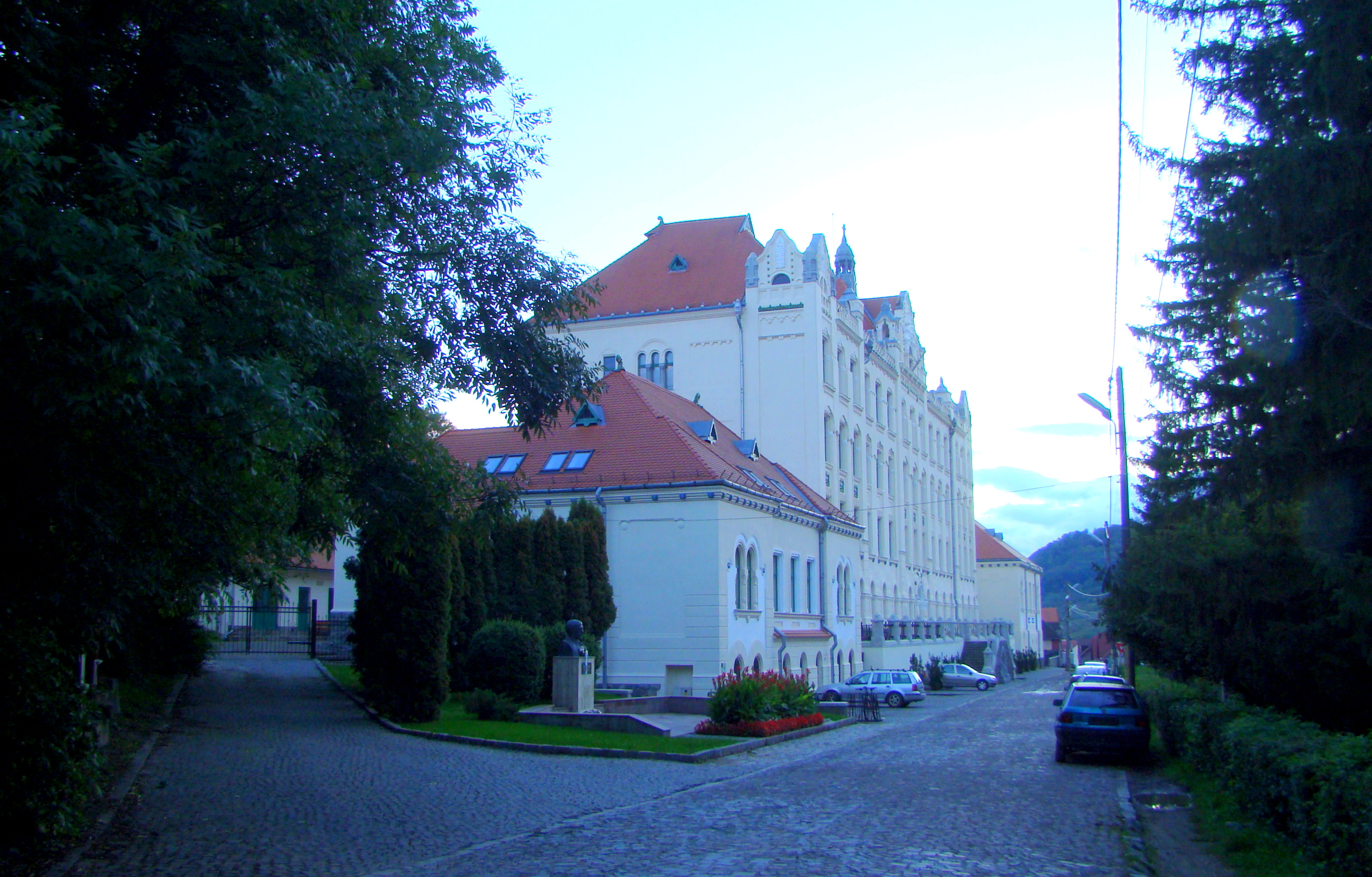
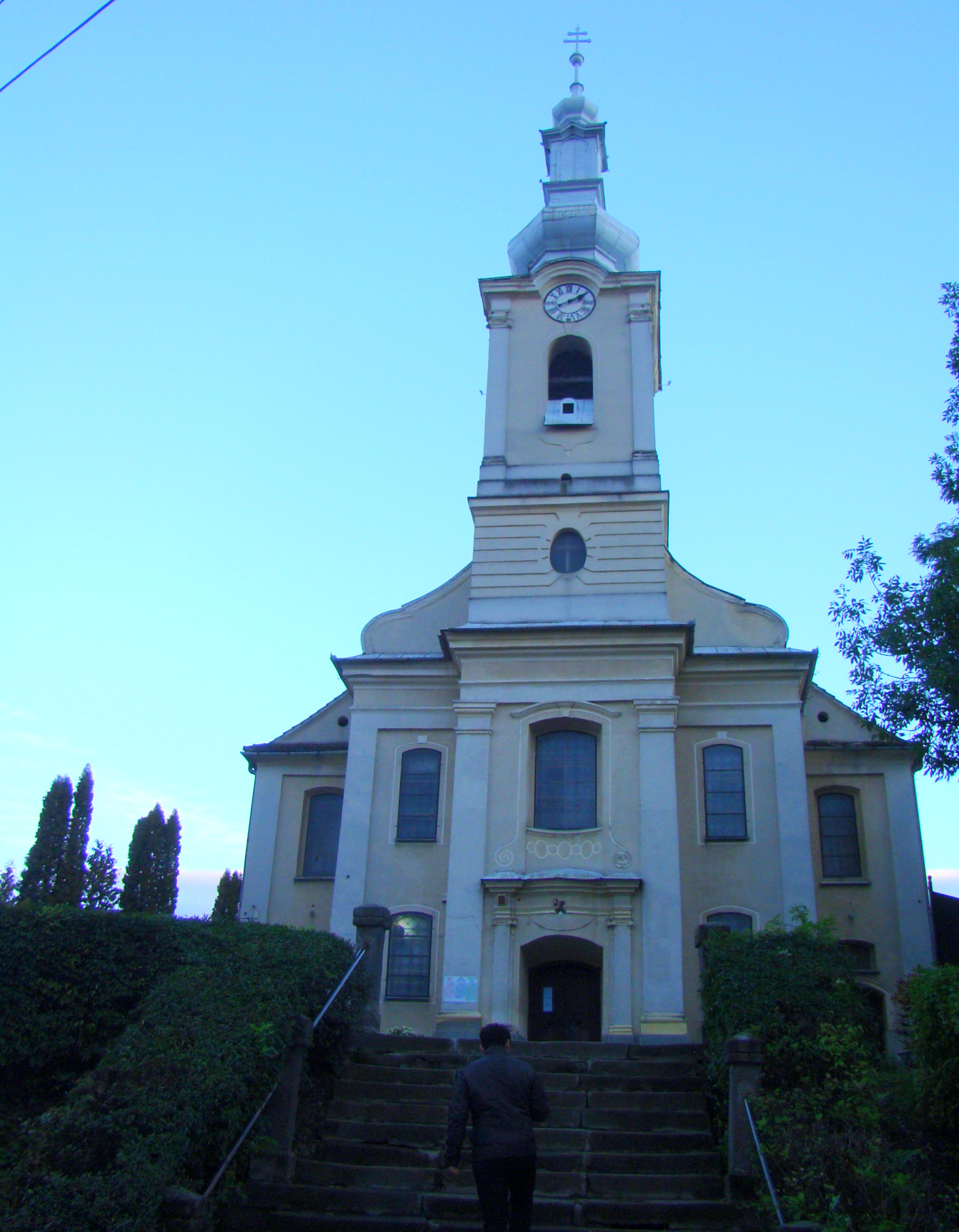
- Odorheiu Secuiesc City Hall Áron Tamási High School Saint Nicholas Catholic Church

- Flag Coat of arms

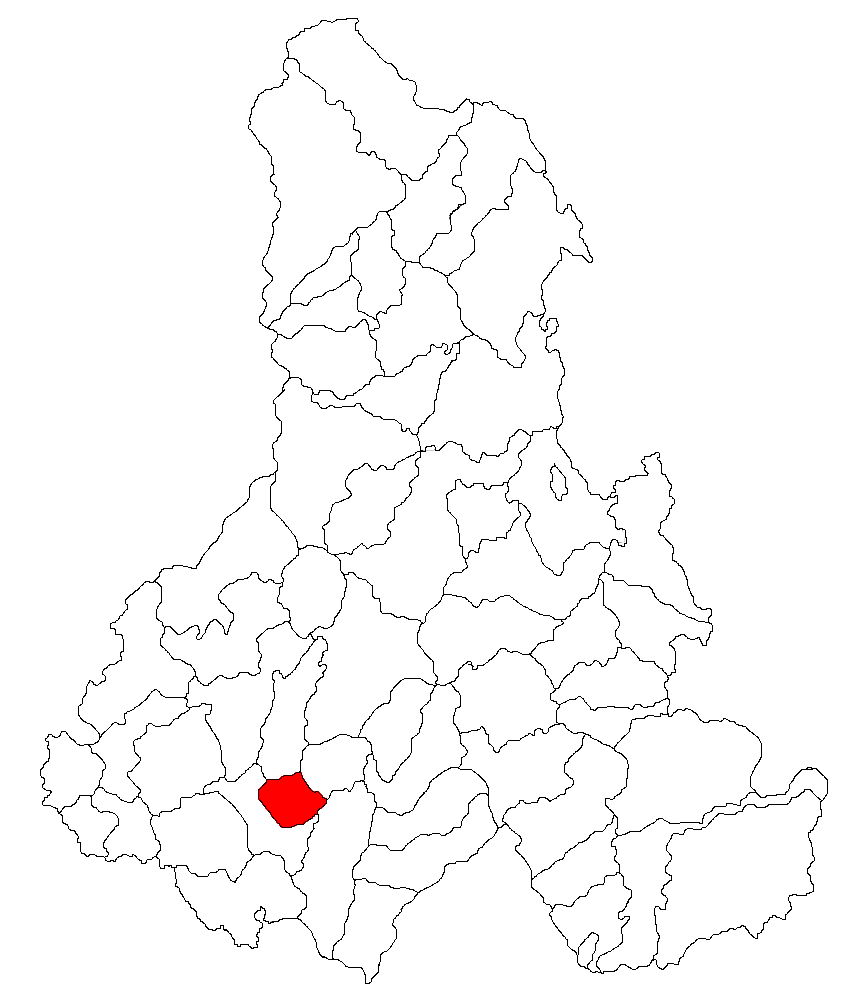
- Location in Harghita County

- Location in Romania
- Coordinates: 46°18′50″N 25°18′6″E
- Country: Romania
- County: Harghita

Government
  - Mayor (2024–2028): István Szakács-Paál (UDMR)
- Area: 47.49 km^{2} (18.34 sq mi)
- Elevation: 390 m (1,280 ft)
- Population (2021-12-01): 31,335
  - Density: 659.8/km^{2} (1,709/sq mi)
- Time zone: UTC+02:00 (EET)
  - Summer (DST): UTC+03:00 (EEST)
- Postal code: 535600
- Area code: +(40) 266
- Vehicle reg.: HR
- Website: www.udvarhely.ro

Odorheiu Secuiesc (Romanian pronunciation: [odorˌheju sekuˈjesk]; Hungarian: Székelyudvarhely, Hungarian pronunciation: [ˈseːkɛjudvɒrhɛj]; German: Oderhellen) is the second largest municipality in Harghita County, Transylvania, Romania. In its short form, it is also known as Odorhei in Romanian and Udvarhely in Hungarian. The Hungarian name of the town "Udvarhely" means "courtyard place". The town is nicknamed the "Székely Mother City" due to its historical role, and due to its status as an educational hub, the city is also known as the "Athens on the Küküllő"

.

== Demographics ==
At the 2011 census, the city had a population of 34,257; among those for whom data were available, 95.8% were ethnic Hungarians, making it the urban settlement with the third-highest proportion of Hungarians in Romania. The city was also home to communities of ethnic Romanians (2.6%) and Roma (1.5%). According to the 2021 census, Odorheiu Secuiesc had a population of 31,335; of those, 87.29% were Hungarians, 2.3% Romanians, and 1.58% Roma.

As of 2011, half the population of the town professed Roman Catholicism (50.05%), while the remaining half was primarily divided between Hungarian Reformed (30.14%), Unitarian (14.71%), and Romanian Orthodox (2.54%) communities.

Historical population
Year	Pop.	±% p.a.
1912	10,244	—
1930	8,518	−1.02%
1948	10,366	+1.10%
1956	14,162	+3.98%
1966	18,244	+2.57%
1977	28,738	+4.22%
1992	39,959	+2.22%
2002	36,948	−0.78%
2011	34,257	−0.84%
2021	31,335	−0.89%
Source: Census data

== History ==
A Roman fortress was found under the ruins of a medieval fort in the centre of the town. A funeral inscription was also found placed by the veteran, Aelius Equester, former centurion, to his wife Aurelia Juiuni and himself. The inscription dates back to the 7th century AD. Stamps with the letters of the Alpinorum equitata cohort and the Ubiorum cohort were also found in Odorhei. The town, as the former seat of the Udvarhely comitatus, is one of the historical centers of Székely Land. The first known reference to the city was in a papal register of duties in 1334 when it was mentioned by its Hungarian name, a sacerdos de Oduorhel. Since 1615, when Gabriel Bethlen, Prince of Transylvania, reaffirmed the rights of the town, the place has been referred to as Székelyudvarhely.

Udvarhely was the location of the first assembly of Székelys in 1357. A fortress was built in the town in 1451. It was rebuilt and strengthened by John II Sigismund Zápolya in 1565, in order to control the Székelys. Wallachian Prince Michael the Brave allied with the Szekelys and the Habsburgs destroyed the fortress in 1599 during their campaign in Transylvania. It was repeatedly rebuilt and destroyed again during history. The ruins of the structure are nowadays known as "The Székely-Attacked Fortress".

The town was historically part of the Szeklerland region of Transylvania. It was the seat of Udvarhelyszék District until the administrative reform of Transylvania in 1876, when it fell within the Udvarhely County in the Kingdom of Hungary. In the aftermath of World War I, the Union of Transylvania with Romania was declared in December 1918. At the start of the Hungarian–Romanian War of 1918–1919, the town passed under Romanian administration. After the Treaty of Trianon of 1920, it became part of the Kingdom of Romania and was the seat of Odorhei County during the interwar period. In 1940, the Second Vienna Award granted Northern Transylvania to Hungary. Towards the end of World War II, Romanian and Soviet armies entered the town in September 1944. The territory of Northern Transylvania remained under Soviet military administration until 9 March 1945, after which it became again part of Romania. In 1950, after Communist Romania was established, the city became the headquarters of the Odorhei Raion of Stalin Region. Between 1952 and 1960, the town fell within the Magyar Autonomous Region, between 1960 and 1968 the Mureș-Magyar Autonomous Region. After the administrative reform of 1968, the region was abolished, and since then, the town has been part of Harghita County.

The town and the surrounding villages were hit by a significant flood in August 2005.

A statue park of historical persons of importance for the Székelys was unveiled in the town on 22 May 2004. This gave rise to controversy, as one of the statues (The Wandering Szekler) was interpreted in the Romanian press as being the portrait of controversial writer and poet Albert Wass.

== Education ==
The town is renowned in the region for its long and distinguished tradition in secondary education. Its oldest and foremost secondary school is Liceul Teoretic Tamasi Aron Gimnazium (founded by Jesuits in 1593). The lyceum/gimnazium is one of the oldest Hungarian institutions of learning; its current building is an architectural masterpiece of Art Nouveau. Other notable secondary schools include: Backamadarasi Kis Gergely Reformed College (founded in 1670 as one of the most important places of learning by the Hungarian Reformed Church in Transylvania); Benedek Elek Teachers' College (its main building is a monument); Pallo Imre Art and Music School; Eotvos Jozsef Agricultural Technological School.

Odorheiu Secuiesc currently has one institution of higher education College of Modern Business Studies, an affiliate of Edutus College in Tatabanya (Hungary), with degrees in tourism and hospitality management, business administration, marketing and communication, development and economics, agricultural technology, forestry management and e-business. Dual degrees are also offered with Budapest Business School, University of Pannonia in Keszthely, Óbuda University in Budapest, and Széchenyi István University in Győr (Hungary).

== Politics ==
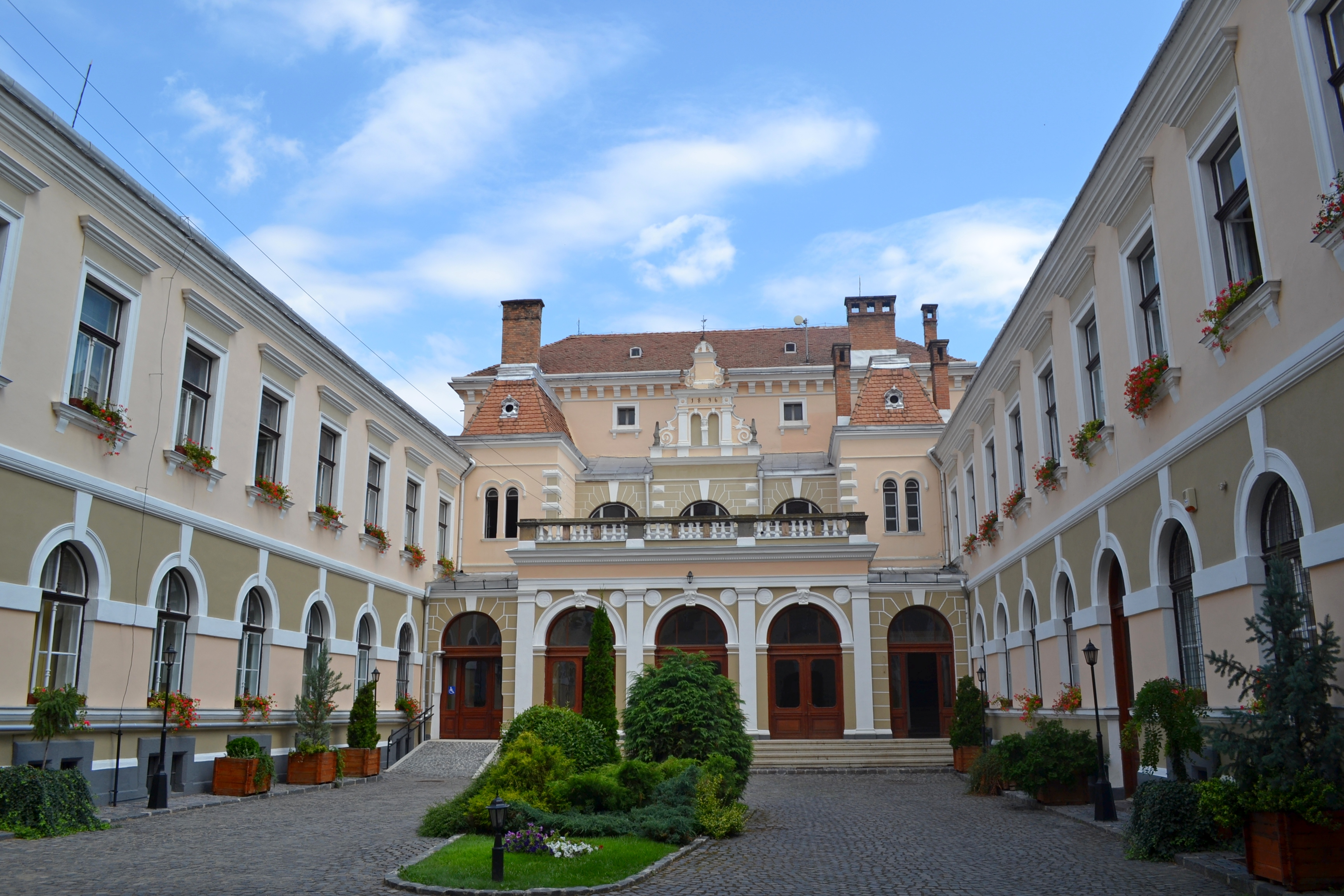
Inner courtyard of the Town Hall

The mayor of Odorheiu Secuiesc is István Szakács-Paál, elected in the 2024 Romanian local elections. The city council has 18 members:

Party	Seats	Current Council
Democratic Alliance of Hungarians in Romania (UDMR/RMDSZ)	16	
Party for Székelyudvarhely/Odorheiu Secuiesc	3	

== Tourism ==
Odorheiu Secuiesc has a sizeable theater, the Haáz Rezső Museum (featuring permanent and seasonal exhibits dedicated to Szekler village life, Szekler arts and crafts, the history of the region, and a growing collection of Hungarian painters in Transylvania), a philharmonic orchestra of Szeklerland, a local TV studio, and several local newspapers. Throughout the year, there are festivals and youth events, a monthly farmer's market selling local, traditional and organic products. With strong cultural ties to Hungary, the town frequently hosts artists, writers and bands from Hungary. The town also features a central park, a large open air pool and several spas. Its main square, flanked by historic public buildings, is Márton Áron Square, or as the locals call it, Horseshoe Square (due to its shape).

Odorheiu Secuiesc and the area has touristic attractions, such as a bike path to Szejke Spa (also the burial ground of the Szekler ethnographer Balázs Orbán) and the Mineral Water Trails Museum, the low-Alpine-type ski resort of Madaras Harghita Mountains (part of the eastern range of the Carpathian Mountains) as well as mountain bungalows and farm guest houses on the mountainous paths and Alpine slopes leading to the Madaras Peak (with farm-to-table dining experiences), in addition to several mineral water springs and pools (Homorod Spa, Zetelaka Lake, with fishing and hunting. The pottery village of Corund is only 25 km (16 mi) away from the city. The salty Bear Lake in Sovata, a significant resort town that has been recently redeveloped, is also less than one hour's drive away (46 km).

The region has seen increased interest in eco-tourism, wildlife hiking and bear-watching, biking, rock climbing, horse riding, photo-tourism and cultural tourism.

The town is a day-trip destination for tourists exploring Transylvania due to its closeness to the Medieval (formerly) Saxon towns of Sighișoara (50 km), Brașov (109 km), Sibiu (150 km), as well as Bran Castle, also known as Dracula Castle, (130 km), and it offers a different cultural experience due to its Hungarian culture. The surrounding villages showcase traditional Szekler-Hungarian house-building techniques and woodcraft, such as the stooped Szekler Gates. The furniture-carving and painting techniques of villages in Szeklerland were showcased in the Smithsonian Folklife Festival's Hungarian Heritage program in June 2013 in Washington, D.C., USA.

The closest airport is Târgu Mureș International Airport (110 km) with direct flights (Rynair, Wizzair, or Tarom) to Budapest, London, Barcelona, Bergamo, Bologna, Madrid, Rome, Bucharest, Brussels, and Pisa.

The route of the Via Transilvanica long-distance trail passes through the city.

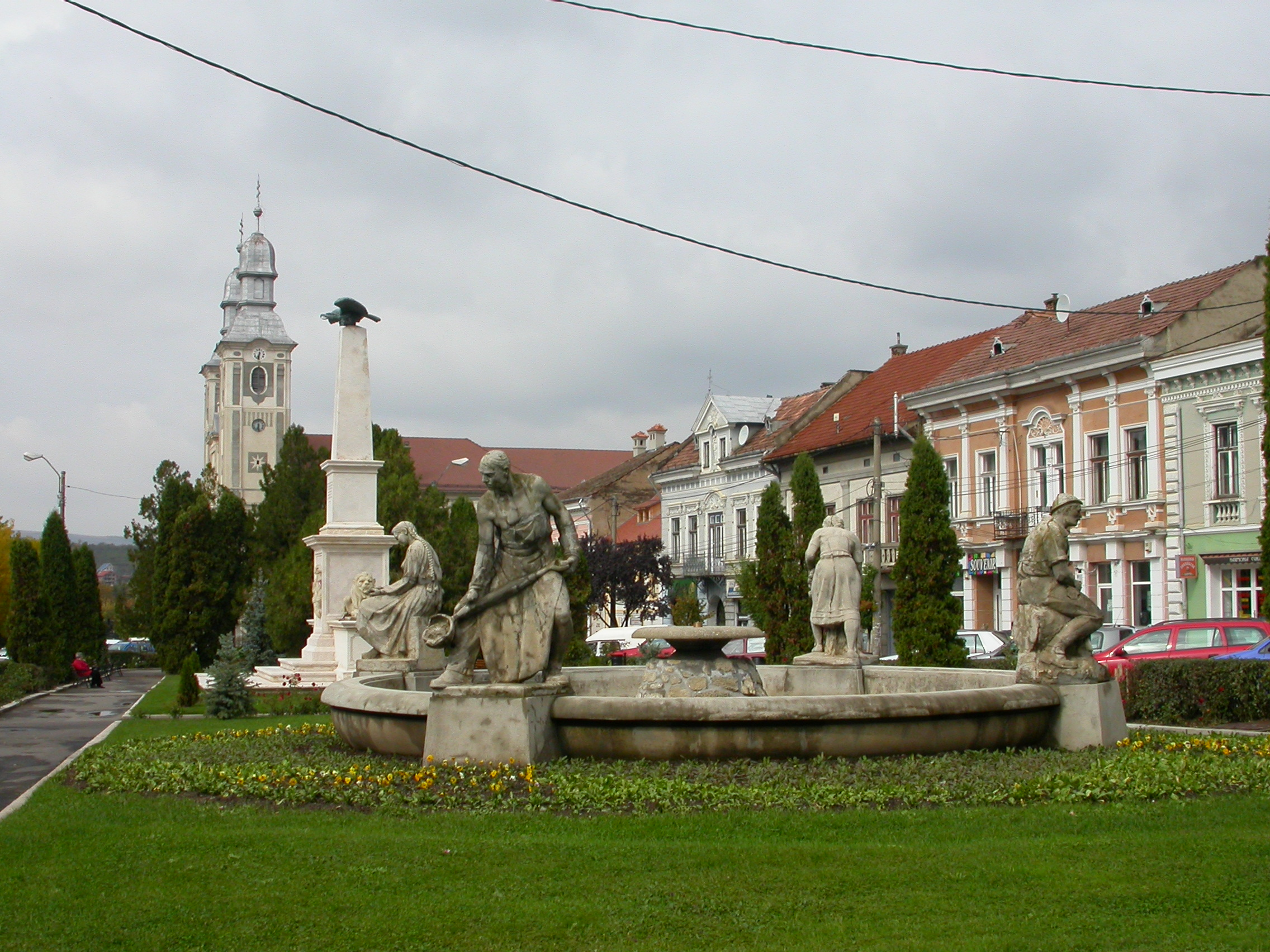
Town Hall Square

== Natives ==
- György Csanády (1895–1942), author of the Székely Anthem
- András Csíky (1930–2024), actor
- Péter Eötvös (1944–2024), Hungarian composer and conductor; principal guest conductor with the BBC Symphony Orchestra in the 1980s; he was principal guest conductor of the Gothenburg Symphony Orchestra
- Zoltan Fejer-Konnerth (b. 1978), Hungarian-German table tennis player
- Márta Károlyi (b. 1942), women's gymnastics coach, currently of U.S. National Women's Team, formerly of Romanian Olympic champion Nadia Comăneci, among many others
- István Lakatos (born around 1620), historian
- Csaba László (b. 1964), footballer and football manager
- Anton Lipošćak (1863–1924), Austro-Hungarian World War I general of the infantry and a Governor-General of the Military Government of Lublin
- Gerő Mály (1884–1952), actor
- György Méhes (1916–2007), Hungarian writer, winner of the Kossuth Prize
- Magdalena Mikloș (b. 1948), handball player
- László Rajk (1909–1949), Hungarian Communist politician, Minister of the Interior then of Foreign Affairs of Communist Hungary, victim of Mátyás Rákosi's show trials
- Rezső Soó (1903–1980), Hungarian botanist and professor at University of Budapest, winner of the Kossuth Prize
- Mózes Székely (1553–1603), prince of Transylvania
- Sándor Tomcsa (1897–1963), writer, playwright, journalist, caricaturist

== Sports ==
One of the oldest association football clubs in Odorheiu Secuiesc is Hargita TE, founded in 1921. The other currently active club is AFC Odorheiu Secuiesc.

== Twin towns – sister cities ==
Odorheiu Secuiesc is twinned with:

- Barcs, Hungary
- Békéscsaba, Hungary
- Berehove, Ukraine
- Budapest, Hungary
- Budavár (Budapest), Hungary
- Cegléd, Hungary
- Dunajská Streda, Slovakia
- Hajdúdorog, Hungary
- Keszthely, Hungary
- Pestszentlőrinc-Pestszentimre (Budapest), Hungary
- Soroksár (Budapest), Hungary
- Subotica, Serbia
- Tatabánya, Hungary
- Tihany, Hungary
- Törökbálint, Hungary
- Vác, Hungary
