= József Dudás =

Hungarian revolutionary (1912–1957)

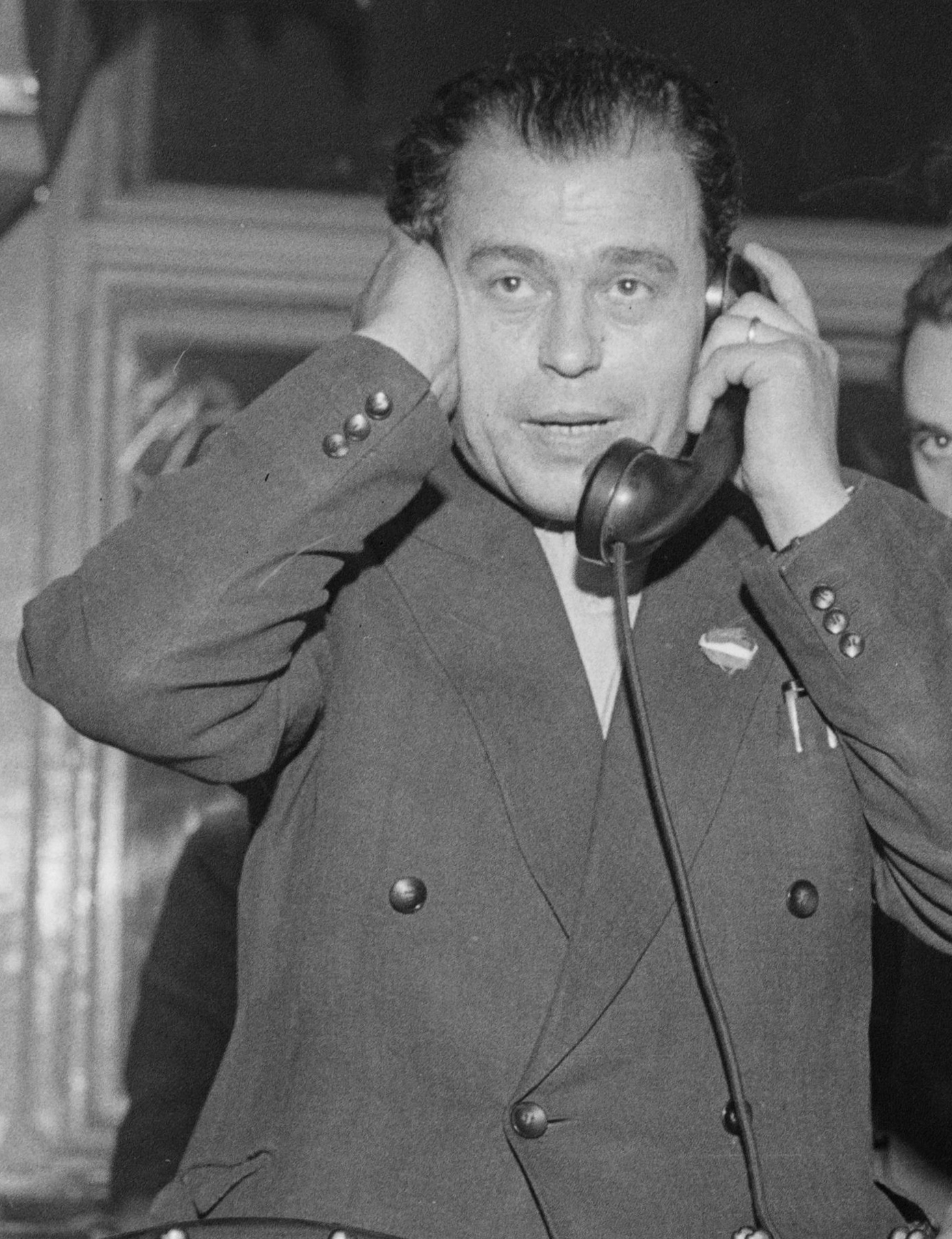
József Dudás in 1956

József Dudás (22 September 1912 – 19 January 1957), was a Hungarian politician and resistance fighter.

== Early life ==
Dudás was born in Marosvásárhely (in Romanian: Târgu Mureş) in Austria-Hungary (today in Transylvania, Romania). As a very young man, he joined the illegal Communist Party in Transylvania. In 1933 he was arrested and sentenced to nine years in prison. When Northern Transylvania was transferred to Hungary as part of the Second Vienna Award in 1940, he was released and he moved to Budapest.

== World War II ==
During World War II, he worked within the anti-fascist movement acting as a liaison between groups. When the war ended, Dudás was a member of an unofficial ceasefire delegation that visited Moscow, and he was a founding member of the Liberation Committee of the Hungarian National Uprising. In late 1945 he joined the Independent Smallholders' Party and was elected to the Budapest government. As the communists mounted their campaign to take over Hungary, Dudás was arrested and detained until he was handed over to Romanian state security in 1951. Released in 1954, he returned to Hungary.

== Hungarian revolution and execution ==
Working as an engineer when the Hungarian Revolution of 1956 broke out, he took to addressing crowds and on 29 October, established the Second District National Committee, with a 25-point program demanding, a coalition government, a multi-party system and neutrality. He also started a newspaper (Magyar Függetlenség—Hungarian Independence), which headlined, ‘We do not recognize the present government!’ At this same time the so-called "Dudás Group" consisting of about 400 armed men was formed.

Dudás was an odd character but there were rumors about him among the revolutionary forces, such as that he sat around a desk with hoards of cash, and had a torture chamber for members of Hungary's AVH Secret Police. Rumors that Dudás thought he could take over in place of the newly appointed Nagy circulated, and in an attempt to take over the Foreign Ministry, General Kiraly ordered Dudas' own men to arrest him for "counter-revolutionary" acts, or at least acts that were attributed to him (an attack on the Foreign Ministry; looting of the National Bank). Once in handcuffs, Dudás' men left the building, and he was released because he was not truly a threat to the government, but Nagy needed it to look like he was trying to neutralize threats in order to appease the Russian Communists.

On 4 November he was wounded and taken to a hospital. On 21 November he was tricked into entering the Parliament building and was arrested by the Soviets. He was charged with leadership of a conspiracy and on 14 January 1957 he was sentenced to death, which was carried out on 19 January 1957.
