= Kálmán Mihalik =

Hungarian composer (1896–1922)

Kálmán Mihalik (21 February 1896 – 6 September 1922) was a Hungarian physician and composer, best known for setting the music of the Székely Himnusz.

== Early life and studies ==
Mihalik was born in Oravicabánya (now Oravița) to a Székely woman from Csík County and a burgess from Kassa (now Košice). He absolved his high school studies in the Piarist and the Unitarian grammar school of Kolozsvár (now Cluj-Napoca), making his matura in 1915. Subsequently, Mihalik was enrolled at the Franz Joseph University, however, his studies were interrupted by the World War I, forcing him to spend several years on the front. In the final period of the war, after the Romanian forces took over Kolozsvár, the university moved first to Budapest and later to Szeged, where Mihalik followed them. After finishing his studies he remained in the university, became the assistant lecturer of Béla Reinbold and worked as a medical researcher.

== Composer of the Székely Himnusz ==
In 1920, together with four others, György Csanády founded the Association of Székely University and College Students (Székely Egyetemista és Főiskolai Hallgatók Egyesülete; SZEFHE), a self-help organization that aimed to create a sense of belonging of those who had to fled their home after the war, and whose homeland was ceded to Romania by the Treaty of Trianon. In 1921, Csanády wrote a poem for students in exile, for which Mihalik, a long-term friend of Csanády, composed the music. The song written for girls choir was first performed on 22 May 1922 at the annual meeting of SZEFHE, under the title Kantáté.

Mihalik died in the autumn of 1922. In his obituary, presumably written by Csanády, the song was already called Székely Himnusz, under which name it became well known later. Although after the World War II it was banned both in the Communist Hungary and Romania, the song remained popular and turned into a symbol of resistance and togetherness, and on 5 September 2009 it was adopted as the anthem of Székely Land.

== Death and legacy ==
Mihalik died of typhus on 6 September 1922 and was buried in the Inner City Cemetery of Szeged. His resting place was forgotten for 70 years and was only revealed after the transition in Hungary. In 2009 he got an honorary grave near the entrance of the cemetery, consecrated by Most Reverend Endre Gyulai, Bishop Emeritus of the Diocese of Szeged.
