= György Csanády =

Hungarian poet, journalist and radio director

György Csanády (Hungarian: [ˈɟørɟ ˈt͡ʃɒnaːdi]; 23 February 1895 – 3 May 1952) was a Hungarian poet, journalist and radio director of Székely origins. He is the author of Székely himnusz.

== Early life and career ==
Born in Székelyudvarhely (Odorheiu Secuiesc, then part of Austria-Hungary, today part of Romania), Csanády studied in the Reformed Grammar School of his hometown, absolving his matura in 1913. Subsequently, he earned a degree at the Budapest Academy of Commerce, however, he never pursued a professional career, but lived for and from the literature.

Csanády fought in the World War I from 1915 to 1918, when he got wounded and was discharged. After the collapse of the Austro-Hungarian Monarchy, Csanády resettled with his family in Hungary, where he worked as journalist, editor and later director. In 1920 he was a founding member of the "Association of Székely University and College Students" (Székely Egyetemi és Föiskolai Hallgatók Egyesülete), a self-help organization of young Székelys who fled their home in the storm of the war. In 1921, Csanády wrote the lyrics of the "Székely Himnusz", that was set to music by Kálmán Mihalik in the next year and was adopted by the Szekler National Council as the anthem of Székely Land in 2009.

A devotee of literature, Csanády edited Új Élet from 1926, as well as beginning in 1927 the Híd. In 1928, he became an associate of the Hungarian Radio, where the wrote and later also directed a number of radio plays. In 1940, he was appointed head of the site coverage department, and from 1943 until 1948 he worked as the Chief Deputy Director of the Hungarian Radio. His drama, titled INRI, was staged at Hungarian National Theatre in Budapest in 1940.

== Death and legacy ==
Csanády died on 3 May 1952 and was buried in the Farkasréti Cemetery, in Budapest. Later, in accordance with his will, his ashes were placed in the family tomb in the Reformed Cemetery of Odorheiu Secuiesc. A memorial plaque of Csanády is to find on the house he lived in, until his relocation to Hungary. The work of László Hunyadi was revealed in 2004 by literature historian Béla Pomogáts and then-mayor of Odorheiu Secuiesc, Jenő Szász.

== Radio plays ==
- Csokonai
- Katona József
- Marconi
- Szombat este

== Publications ==
- Az évek (poems, 1922)
- Álmok (poems, 1926)
- Ének (poems, 1934)
- A májusi nagyáldozat (poems, 1941)
