= Székely himnusz =

Anthem of the Székely Land

English: Székely Anthem
- anthem of the Székely Land (regional)
- Lyrics: György Csanády, 1921
- Music: Kálmán Mihalik, 1921
- Adopted: 5 September 2009

Instrumental recording of the anthem

"Székely himnusz" ("Székely Anthem"; Romanian: Imnul secuiesc) is a 1921 poem adopted by Szekler National Council as the anthem of the Székely Land, an area in present-day Romania, on 5 September 2009. The lyrics were written by György Csanády and its music was composed by Kálmán Mihalik.

== Lyrics ==
Only the first stanza and the refrain (highlighted here in bold text) are officially part of the anthem, but subsequent stanzas are also occasionally sung.

Hungarian original

**Ki tudja merre, merre visz a végzet**
**Göröngyös úton, sötét éjjelen.**
**Vezesd** (Note: "Segítsd" in the original poem.) **még egyszer győzelemre néped,**
**Csaba királyfi** (Note: Originally "király a".) **csillagösvényen.**

Refrén:
**Maroknyi székely porlik, mint a szikla**
**Népek harcának** (Note: Originally "harcától".) **zajló tengerén.**
**Fejünk az ár, jaj, százszor elborítja,** (Note: Originally "Fejünk az ár ezerszer elborítja".)
**Ne hagyd elveszni Erdélyt, Istenünk!** (Note: Originally "Ne hagyd el Erdélyt, Erdélyt, Istenem!".)

Ameddig élünk magyar ajkú népek
Megtörni lelkünk nem lehet soha
Szülessünk bárhol, világ bármely pontján
Legyen a sorsunk jó vagy mostoha.

**Refrén**

Már másfélezer év óta Csaba népe
Sok vihart élt át, sorsa mostoha
Külső ellenség jaj, de gyakran tépte
Nem értett egyet otthon sem soha.

**Refrén**

Keserves múltunk, évezredes balsors
Tatár, s török dúlt, labanc rabigált
Jussunk e honban, Magyar Székelyföldön
Szabad hazában élni boldogan.

**Refrén**

Hős szabadságát elveszti Segesvár
Mádéfalvára fájón kell tekints
Földed dús kincsét népek élik s dúlják
Fiaidnak sokszor még kenyérre sincs.

**Refrén**

Édes Szűzanyánk, könyörögve kérünk,
Mentsd meg e népet, vérző Nemzetet,
Jussunk e Honban, magyar-székely földön
Szabad hazában éljünk boldogan!

**Refrén**

Poetic English variant
(H.W. Morrison)

**Who knoweth where, O where our destiny shall be?**
**On this rough road amid the darkest night**
**Lead on thy nation, O lead on to victory,**
**Csaba our Prince, on paths of heavenly light.**

Refrain:
**Pounded and crushed upon the rocks, the Székely few**
**By nations’ strife and battle’s deepest flood**
**Our drownéd heads, by countless tides were drenched through**
**Let Transylvania fall not, O Our God!**

Whilst life remains with us, we of Hungarian birth
Our spirit shall not broken be, nor fail
Wherever born, wherever brought upon earth,
Though fate be kindly yet, or ill prevail.

**Refrain**

People of Csaba, thrice five hundred years through
Survived the storms, though harsh their bitter fate
The foe without, whose tearing wounds they once knew
Even at home, discord did not abate.

**Refrain**

Our grievous past, our thousand years of harsh pain
The prey of Tartar, Turk, and Hapsburg thrall
Our prize of Magyar Szekélyland to regain
A happy home and freedom for us all.

**Refrain**

O Segesvár, thy freedom cast asunder
Mádéfalva, we watch thee full of pain
Our lands’ rich treasures, lost as foemen plunder
No crust of bread thy sons can hope to gain.

**Refrain**

O holy Virgin, hear as we implore thee
Save thou our people, wracked with bleeding pain
Then let us go unto the Székely country
A free and happy homeland there to gain.

**Refrain**

== See also ==
- Székelys
- Flag of the Székelys
- Siebenbürgenlied
