= Barlabássy family =

Hungarian noble family

- Hungarian noble family
- Parent house: Genus Kaplon
- Country: Hungary; Principality of Transylvania; Hungary
- Founded: before 1323

The Barlabássy or Barabássy family was a noble family in the Kingdom of Hungary, which possessed landholdings mostly in Transylvania.

== Name ==
They adopted their surname after their place of origin, Barabás in the region Tiszahát of Bereg County. Contemporary records and documents preserved the name of family in various formats: Barlabasi (1381), Barrabasi (1384), Barlabasy (1386), Barabassy, Barabasy, Barabassy, Barrabasy (15th century). They were also referred to as "Barlabaschy" in Transylvanian Saxon dialect (1487) and "Barlabassel" in the register of the University of Vienna (1505), in addition to a Latin Humanist variant "Barlabassius" (1519). The first Hungarian-language charter which preserved their name was issued in 1517 by Michael II, who called himself "Barabási", in accordance with its pronunciation (but the document itself was preserved only through an 18th-century transcription). By the time of the Principality of Transylvania in the 17th century, their last name was uniformly formed as "Barabássy".

Throughout the centuries, they also used various noble titles, which implied their residence, ownership of lands or location. Their first nobility prefix appeared in contemporary documents in the 1450s (according to today's spelling): "de Petlend", "de Mócs" and "de Szentpál". Later the variants "de Csesztve" (1470s) and "de Héderfája" (1490s) became more frequent. After the division of the landholdings, other prefixes appeared in the 16th century: "de Alparét", "de Csíkfalva", "de Nyárádtő et Lőrincfalva" and "de Makfalva" (after locations, present-day all in Romania).

== Origins ==
According to family traditions, the Barlabássys descended from the influential and wealthy gens (clan) Borsa, but there is no contemporary record of that. The family originated from the region Beregi-Tiszahát (today roughly Szabolcs-Szatmár-Bereg County in Hungary), where Barabás (or Barlabás) also located. The assumption that the family came from Barlabás, Maros Seat (present-day Bârlibaș in Romania) is unfounded. Based on the data found by János Karácsonyi, historian Pál Engel proved that the Barlabásis originated from the Papos branch of the gens (clan) Kaplon.

The earliest known member of the family was one Nicholas Barlabási (Latin: Nicolai de Barlabas), whose sons – Ladislaus, Csépán, Ivan and Nicholas – were mentioned together in February 1323. They owned a portion of land and a stone church in Pátroha. They were involved in a lawsuit with castellan Paul Magyar, who was granted the village as a royal donation by Charles I of Hungary. The brothers and Magyar reconciled with each other and the Barlabássys handed over their estates for 20 marks. The four brothers also owned Petlend (near present-day Szatmárcseke) in 1327, when they entered into a defense contract with each other. Csépán was again mentioned in 1329, when appeared as a witness in a lawsuit. While Ladislaus and Nicholas (II) had no known descendants, Csépán had two sons; Barabbas acted as royal commissioner (bailiff) in two occasions in 1374 and 1378, during the reign of Ladislaus I of Hungary. The younger one, George entered ecclesiastical career and was styled with the title of "magister". He served in the chancellery of the queen mother Elizabeth of Poland. After the death of Louis I, he entered the service of his widow Elizabeth of Bosnia, who acted as regent on behalf of her daughter Queen Mary. George was referred to as "special notary and familiaris" of the dowager queen in 1384. Elizabeth confirmed the previous land donation of Kissurány to the brothers in 1382. George and Barabbas presumably became disgraced by 1386; Queen Elizabeth confiscated Kissurány from them and returned it to their original owner Nicholas Kissurányi. This resulted a conflict between the two families in the upcoming decade. Ladislaus Kissurányi complained before the convent of Lelesz (present-day Leles, Slovakia) in 1394 that Barabbas' sons, John, Ladislaus and Francis constantly looted and pillaged his land. They also joined the nationwide rebellion against King Sigismund in 1403, as a result much of their possessions were confiscated, including Jánd and their ancient seat Barabás, which was shared by several families in the 15th century. The brother regained some reliance in the royal court, John and Ladislaus were referred to royal vassals ("homo noster") in 1418. They had no known descendants, which resulted the extinction of Csépán's branch.

Nicholas' another son Ivan had a daughter Anne, who married a certain Peter, who possessed lands in Szabolcs County. His son Michael (I) died by 1398; his widow, a certain Veronica complained that Lawrence Mikai harassed her estates. As a result, Sigismund forced Mikai to pledge his land of Papos to the Barlabássys in that year, which resulted a long-lasting lawsuit between the two families in the 15th century. The marriage of Michael and Veronica produced two sons, Ernye, who served as vice-ispán of Bereg County in 1389, and Vincent, who was referred to as "homo noster" in 1416. At the end of his life, he was also vice-ispán of Bereg County from 1434 to 1439, as a familiaris of Ladislaus Pálóci. The later members of the Barlabássy family descended from Ernye. The last person, who had relative influence in the place of their origin was John (the grandson of Vincent), who functioned as vice-ispán of Szabolcs County from 1454 to 1456.

== Advance in Transylvania ==
In the first half of the 15th century, the Barlabássy family had several lawsuits with their neighbors, for instance the Mikai and Perényi families in Bereg and Szabolcs counties which contributed to the family gradually moving southeast in a direction to Transylvania. After the ancient lands in the Bereg region were permanently lost to their rivals, the Barlabássys acquired possessions along the river Maros (Mureș) in Central Transylvania, first of all at Inner and Outer Szolnok, Doboka, Kolozs and Torda counties, and later Fehér and Küküllő counties, and the Székely seat of Marosszék ("Maros Seat"). By the reign of Matthias Corvinus, they became familiares of the powerful Báthory family, one of the most influential and richest noble houses in Transylvania.

Ernye's grandson John married his second wife, Veronica Haranglábi, an offspring of a rich Transylvanian family, sometime after 1440. As a dowry, John acquired portions in Kolozs and Küküllő counties – including Mócs (Mociu) –, and the Barlabássy family gradually became part of the Transylvanian elite in the second half of the 15th century. John had two sons, Michael and John. They together acquired Csesztve (today part of Ocna Mureș town in Romania) and the surrounding lands by the 1450s. They built a country-house there, which became the permanent residence of the Barlabássys. The Csesztve lordship laid along an important trade route near the river Maros and the salt mines of Marosújvár (Ocna Mureș). In the subsequent years, they also bought Csombord (Ciumbrud), Váradja (Oarda), Lomfalva and Marosszentkirály (Sâncraiu de Mureș).

In Kolozs County, the Petlend branch also possessed lands, its members were Anthony and George, but their family relationship to the other branches is uncertain. Both of them only had daughters (Magdalene and Agatha, respectively), and the country-house of Petlend along the river Tur was alienated to the Borz family (the kinship of Anthony's widow).

Around the same time, another member of the family (parentage is unknown), Nicholas Barlabássy de Szentpál became a prominent landowner in Székely Land, which resulted a basis for the future expansion in Marosszék. He also integrated into the Székely aristocracy ("chief horsemen"). Nicholas had three children: Michael, Dorothea and Julianna. Michael died by 1463, left behind a widow and two orphans, Nicholas and Anne. The unidentified widow was involved in a lawsuit against her sisters-in-law, refusing to the transfer of the property to which they are entitled in their late brother's last will. Dorothea married Ladislaus Demjénfy, while Julia was the wife of Blaise Meggyes de Szentgyörgy, who was involved in a nationwide conspiracy against Matthias in 1467. Julianna continued her lawsuit against her nephew Nicholas and niece Anna (wife of Pancras Bolyai). Julianna had a daughter, also Anne, who married Nicholas Tót de Szentanna. The Barlabássy de Szentpál branch died out with Nicholas around 1493, but the lawsuit between the two branches were inherited by the two Anne's husbands and their families (the Bolyai and Tót kinships), lasted until 1502.

== Heyday ==
John was made castellan of Gyulafehérvár by King Matthias Corvinus sometime after 1467. In the 1470s, Barlabássy entered the service of Stephen Báthory, a respected military general and Voivode of Transylvania. He participated in various campaigns and counter-attacks in response to the Ottoman incursions. As castellan of Gyulafehérvár, Barlabássy was a dedicated patron of arts and sciences. He helped to spread Renaissance arts, science and architecture throughout Transylvania. The Csesztve and Héderfája branch descended from castellan John, as his brother Michael (died before 1482) had no known children from his spouse Sophia Szentpáli. It is plausible that John married an unidentified noblewoman from the wealthy Erdélyi de Somkerék family. Their marriage produced three sons, John, Leonard and Michael. He also adopted John Lászai, a noted Humanist poet and clergyman. Among his three natural sons, Michael had no known descendants. He was referred to as vice-chamberlain of the salt chamber of Szék (Sic) in 1512. He was among the councillors of Voivode John Zápolya in January 1514. He was styled a "homo noster" in March 1517, during a lawsuit against Stephen Károlyi in March 1517. He issued a Hungarian-language contract in 1517, the first such regarding the Barlabássy family and also a somewhat noted text of the history of the Hungarian language before the Battle of Mohács (1526).

=== Csesztve branch ===
The eldest son, John inherited the country-house at Csesztve. Until the end of the 15th century, John and Leonard acquired possessions together, for instance Miklóslaka (Micoșlaca), Héderfája (Idrifaia) and Mikefalva (Mica), laid in Küküllő County. They remained familiares of the powerful Báthory family, which was exploited to their advantage in the rapid growth of their wealth. John married twice; his second wife was Magdalene Erdélyi from 1505 (the widow of Francis Vízaknai). It is possible that he was castellan of Görgény (today Gurghiu, Romania) in 1504. John died not long before December 1512, when his lord John Zápolya provided for the division of his landholdings in accordance with his last will and testament. The document says, John owned possessions in Alparét (Bobâlna), where a county-house laid, Zápróc (Băbdiu), Szóváros (Suarăș), Tálosfalva (Blidărești), Antos (Antăș), Erdővásárhely (Oșorhel), Radákszinye (Răzbuneni) and Bujdos (Vâlcelele) in Inner Szolnok County, present-day all settlements belong to the town of Bobâlna. Beside that, John also possessed portions in Mócs, Gyéres (Câmpia Turzii), Csehtelke (Vișinelu), Báld (Balda), Nagynyulas (Milaș), Kisszék (Săcălaia), Aranykút (Aruncuta) and Szentmárton (Gligorești) in Kolozs County, portions in Gerebenes, Kapus (Căpușu Mare), Póka (Păingeni), Ikland (Icland), Lekence (Lechința), Keménytelke (Cipăieni), Bodon (Papiu Ilarian), Szakál (Săcalu de Pădure), Pagocsa (Pogăceaua), Záh (Zau de Câmpie), Fűzkút (Sălcuța) in Torda County, in addition to whole Miklóslaka and portions in Csesztve, Benkeszeg, Ózd (Ozd), Táté (Totoi), Bagó (Băgău), Csongva (Uioara de Jos), Marosszentkirály, Oláhtordos (Turdaș) and Ispánlaka (Șpălnaca) in Fehér County.

John and his unidentified first wife had five children. The eldest one Michael inherited the estate of Alparét with its country-house and accessories in 1512, in addition to Csesztve, which was shared with his brother, Bishop John, the most illustrious member of the branch. Michael married Catherine Bánffy de Losoncz, they lived in Alparét, establishing a namesake sub-branch. The second son, Bishop John was able to attend foreign universities due to his uncle Leonard's wealth and influence. John belonged to the Humanist circle centered around Gyulafehérvár. As a loyal partisan of King John Zápolya, he served as de facto the last Bishop of Csanád between 1537 and 1552, before the Ottoman Empire conquered the southern parts of the Kingdom of Hungary, including the whole territory of the diocese. John's third son Gregory died young, sometime before 1512. The daughters Catherine and Sophia (also Margaret) became the spouses of Transylvanian nobles, Sigismund Szarvasdi and Oswald Bogáti de Radnót, respectively. Sometime after his first wife' death, the elderly John married Magdalene Erdélyi in 1505; they had two sons Francis and John. There were still minors during their father's death in 1512. Through a marriage, Francis acquired lands in Csíkfalva (Vărgata), becoming a member of the local Székely elite. He was involved in various lawsuits against his much older step-brother Bishop John.

Among John's children, only Michael had descendants; the marriage of Michael and Catherine Bánffy produced a son, Michael. As he died early in 1516, the child was raised by his uncle Bishop John and his mother's second husband Ladislaus Kozárvári (from 1517). Michael married Catherine Tomori, daughter of Stephen Tomori, the Vice-voivode of Transylvania from 1523 to 1526 and from 1528 to 1531, and niece of Paul Tomori, commander-in-chief of the Hungarian army in the Battle of Mohács in 1526, where he was killed. Michael and his wife also lived in Alparét. Their only son, Francis was also born there around 1540. After his father died in 1555, Francis became the last offspring of the Barlabássy's Csesztve branch, inheriting large-scale landholdings throughout Transylvania and Székely Land (including Csíkfalva, owned by his namesake great-uncle). Francis supported the policy of John Sigismund Zápolya, King-elect of Hungary and later the first Prince of Transylvania. Under his influence, Barlabássy was one of those Transylvanian lords, who converted to Unitarianism from Roman Catholicism in the 1560s. After the death of John Sigismund, he was a partisan of Caspar Bekes, a claimant to the Transylvanian throne against Stephen Báthory. After Báthory's victory, Francis lost all political influence. He had an unidentified wife and children. He was slaughtered together with his family in 1599 during the Long Turkish War, thus the Csesztve branch became extinct.

=== Héderfája branch ===
Leonard was the most illustrious member of the Barlabássy family, who served as Vice-voivode of Transylvania from 1501 to 1525, as a familiaris of the Báthory family then John Zápolya. He and his elder brother John acquired several lands across Transylvania (see above). He built a Renaissance-style country-house in Héderfája in 1508, which was elevated into the status of his official residence. Based on the sources, it is plausible that he bought the portions of his brothers and exclusively owned the settlement alone by that time. After John Zápolya was appointed voivode in 1510, Leonard became a member of his inner advisory council. He participated in the suppression of the 1514 peasant revolt, led by George Dózsa. He was also known to have been a patron of arts, who contributed significantly to the spread of the Renaissance in Transylvania. He bequeathed different sums to several ecclesiastical institutions and monasteries. Art historian Jolán Balogh emphasized the country-house of Héderfája is the earliest surviving Renaissance-style building in the province of Transylvania, excluding the reconstructions of some royal castles.

Leonard married Margaret Bogáti de Radnót. Their marriage produces five children: John, Leonard, Catherine, Magdalene and Sophia. After the death of his first wife at an unknown time, he married Magdalene Geréb de Vingárt. They had four children: Anne, Farkas, Barbara and Euphrosyne. Barlabásy's daughters were engaged to local nobles from prominent families. For instance, Magdalene became the wife of Gregory Erdélyi de Somkerék, while Sophia married to Nicholas III Vízaknai. Leonard provided for the proper education of his sons; in his last will he forbade his adult sons – John and Leonard – not to interrupt their university studies in any way. John attended the University of Kraków in 1527, and was a schoolmate of János Sylvester. John and Leonard were still alive in 1554. John had two sons, Caspar and Francis, members of the so-called Kápolna sub-branch. They were involved in a lawsuit with their cousin Leonard, son of Leonard in 1560. Caspar was a supporter of John Sigismund Zápolya. He was present at Fogaras (Făgăraș) in 1566, as a member of the retinue of Székely captain Paul Bánffy de Losoncz, who took over the castle from Gregory Apafi. Caspar lived in Kápolna (Căpâlna de Sus, 2km near Héderfája), while Francis owned Somostelke (Șomoștelnic) by 1580. Vice-voivode Leonard's youngest son Farkas was born from his second marriage. In 1544, he owned portions in Ikland, Szakál, Keménytelke and Csüdőtelke (Cuștelnic), which he donated to his sister Anne and her husband.

The Makfalva sub-branch descended from Leonard, the grandson of vice-voivode Leonard. He possessed portions in Szélkút (Sălcud) and Páncélcseh (Panticeu). He married twice; his first wife was unidentified, while his second wife was the wealthy Helena Csoronk de Nagylak, the widow of Ambrose Mosdossy. They had two daughters (Margaret and Drusiana) and a son (Stephen). Leonard and Helena bought the whole part of Papfalva (Popești). Leonard and his family lived in his wife's inherited country-house at Nagylak (Nădlac). Leonard was pledged a portion in Csekelaka (Cecălaca) by John Horváth de Káptalan in 1590. Leonard was a confidant of Prince Sigismund Báthory. He was sent as an envoy to the court of Ieremia Movilă, Prince of Moldavia in 1598. His task was to free Michael Jere de Csicsó and John Simó from the captivity at Suceava.

== In the Principality of Transylvania ==
By the early 17th century, only two sub-branches remained from vice-voivode Leonard's offspring. The youngest son Farkas had a namesake son. Farkas (II) was a courtly familiaris of John Sigismund Zápolya. For his military service, he was granted land donations in Marosszék and Lőrincfalva (Leordeni) in 1566. The latter place became his main residence. John Sigismund also donated Nyárádtő (Ungheni) and another portions in Lőrincfalva in 1570. Following the death of John Sigismund, he supported the aspirations of Stephen Báthory. He fought in the Battle of Kerelőszentpál in 1575, where Báthory defeated his rival Caspar Bekes (Farkas' distant relative Francis supported the pretender, but missed the battle itself). During the voivodeship of Christopher Báthory, Farkas served as royal judge of Marosszék around 1580.

Farkas had four children from his unidentified wife: Michael, Elizabeth, Catherine and Peter. The latter served as lieutenant of Marosszék banderium. In 1595, he acquired noble estate at Székelyvásárhely. As a partisan of Sigismund Báthory, he participated in the Battle of Temesvár in 1597, when the prince laid siege the town, held by Emperor Rudolph, but he lifted the siege when an Ottoman army of 20,000 strong approached the fortress. During the siege, Peter was wounded his chest by a bullet, leading his regiment. Farkas' daughter Catherine married Ladislaus Daczó de Sepsiszentgyörgy in 1599. Her second husband was the former Transylvanian chancellor Simon Péchi (from 1624), who was imprisoned for his Sabbatarianism. His lands were also confiscated and he was forced to return Protestantism in 1639 by Prince George I Rákóczi. Simon Péchi and Catherine lived modestly near the village of Kebele (Sânișor). Péchi died in 1643. Thereafter, Catherine was involved in a lawsuit with the daughters of Péchi from his first marriage over property matters. Prince Michael I Apafi issued an interrogation order against Catherine in 1665, but she died in the next year.

Later members of the Barlabássy family descended from the Makfalva branch. Stephen, the son of Leonard (III) acquired Székely noble title, when obtained the estate of Makfalva (Ghindari) through his unidentified wife. After General Giorgio Basta invaded Transylvania, Stephen was among those nobles of Marosszék, who swore loyalty to Emperor-King Rudolph in 1602. His grandsons, George and Francis were still styled as prominent nobles from the region in 1636, during the reign of Prince George I Rákóczi. George's son Stephen participated in George II Rákóczi's disastrous campaign against Poland in 1657. As a flag-bearer of the Székely nation, he was killed during the campaign along with his servants. Stephen's brother Peter was also a confidant of George II Rákóczi. He participated in the Battle of Szászfenes (Florești) in 1660, where Rákóczi was defeated and killed. Peter was captured and later executed upon the order of Prince Ákos Barcsay.

== Family tree ==
Based on Sándor Barabássy's work.

=== Senior branch ===
- Nicholas (fl. 1323)
  - Ladislaus (fl. 1323–27)
  - Csépán (fl. 1323–29)
    - Barabbas (fl. 1374–78)
      - Ladislaus (fl. 1394–1418), homo noster
      - Francis (fl. 1394)
      - John (fl. 1394–1418), homo noster
    - George (fl. 1381–86), magister, chancellery notary
  - Ivan (fl. 1323–27)
    - Anne (fl. 1356) ∞ Peter N
    - Michael (d. before 1398) ∞ Veronica N
      - Ernye (fl. 1389–1416), vice-ispán of Bereg County
        - Michael (fl. 1417–18), homo noster
          - John (fl. 1440–62) ∞ Veronica Haranglábi → Mócs branch
            - Michael (fl. 1468–74, d. before 1482) ∞ Sophia Szentpáli
            - John (fl. 1461–1509†), castellan of Gyulafehérvár → Csesztve and Héderfája branch
        - Paul (fl. 1417)
        - Francis (fl. 1417)
        - Gregory (fl. 1417)
        - John (fl. 1417–38)
        - Ladislaus
          - Michael (fl. 1439)
      - Vincent (fl. 1416–39), vice-ispán of Bereg County
        - Helena
        - Michael (fl. 1449, d. before 1464)
          - John (fl. 1451–66), vice-ispán of Szabolcs County
          - Helena (fl. 1466)
  - Nicholas (fl. 1323–27)

==== Petlend branch ====
- Anthony ∞ Helena Borz de Macskás
  - Magdalene (fl. 1457)
- George
  - Agatha (fl. 1457)

==== Szentpál branch ====
- Nicholas
  - Michael (d. before 1463)
    - Nicholas (fl. 1476, d. before 1493)
    - Anne (fl. 1493) ∞ Pancras Bolyai
  - Dorothea (fl. 1463) ∞ Ladislaus Demjénfy
  - Julianna (fl. 1463–76) ∞ Blaise Meggyes de Szentgyörgy

=== Csesztve and Héderfája branches ===
- John (fl. 1461–1509†), see above ∞ N Erdélyi de Somkerék (?)
  - John (fl. 1492–1512†), homo noster ∞ 1, unidentified, 2, Magdalene Erdélyi (m. 1505) → Csesztve branch
    - (1) Michael (1516†) ∞ Catherine Bánffy → Alparét branch
      - Michael (1514–1555†) ∞ Catherine Tomori
        - Francis (fl. 1545–1599†)
    - (1) John (1482–1560†), Bishop of Csanád
    - (1) Gregory (d. before 1512)
    - (1) Catherine ∞ Sigismund Szarvasdi
    - (1) Sophia (or Margaret) ∞ Oswald Bogáti de Radnót
    - (2) Francis (fl. 1506) → Csíkfalva branch
    - (2) John (fl. 1507)
  - Leonard (fl. 1492–1525†), Vice-voivode of Transylvania ∞ 1, Margaret Bogáthy, 2, Magdalene Geréb
    - (1) John (fl. 1525–54) → Kápolna branch
      - Caspar (fl. 1560–80)
      - Francis (fl. 1560–80)
    - (1) Leonard (fl. 1525–54)
      - Leonard (fl. 1560–98) ∞ 1, unidentified, 2, Helena Csoronk de Nagylak
        - (2) Margaret
        - (2) Drusiana
        - (2) Stephen (fl. 1602–03) → Makfalva branch
    - (1) Catherine (d. before 1524) ∞ Demetrius Nyújtódi de Keresztúr
    - (1) Magdalene ∞ Gregory Erdélyi de Somkerék
    - (1) Sophia (d. before 1555) ∞ 1, Nicholas Vízaknai, 2, John Glesan de Tótfalu
    - (2) Anne (fl. 1525–44) ∞ Nicholas Nemes Nagy
    - (2) Farkas (fl. 1525–44), d. before 1550)
      - Farkas (fl. 1566–80), royal judge of Marosszék → Nyárádtő and Lőrincfalva branch
        - Michael (fl. 1591)
        - Elizabeth (d. before 1627) ∞ Martin Torday de Somogyom
        - Catherine (fl. 1599–1665) ∞ 1, Ladislaus Daczó de Sepsiszentgyörgy (m. 1599), 2, Simon Péchi (m. 1624)
        - Peter (fl. 1595–97), lieutenant of Marosszék banderium
    - (2) Barbara
    - (2) Euphrosyne
  - Michael (fl. 1512–17), vice-chamberlain of the salt chamber of Szék (Sic)
  - John Lászai (1448–1523†), adopted

=== Makfalva branch ===
- Stephen (fl. 1602–03), see above
  - John (fl. 1600)
    - George (fl. 1636) ∞ Anne Sinka
      - Peter (fl. 1636–60†)
      - Stephen (1618–57†)
        - Stephen (fl. 1655–1729†) ∞ Judith Nagy de Iszla
          - Stephen (fl. 1684–1778†), Kuruc captain ∞ Elizabeth Csehétfalvi
            - descendants
          - George (fl. 1685–1776†), envoy of Marosszék ∞ Rebecca Balogh
          - Martin (fl. 1703–83†)
          - Michael (fl. 1705–81†)
        - Martin ∞ Judith Soó de Bere
        - Nicholas
    - Francis (fl. 1636–55)

== Sources ==
- Barabássy, Sándor (2012). Egy reneszánsz mecénás főúr a 15–16. századi Erdélyben. Barlabássy Lénárd erdélyi alvajda, székely alispán kora és tevékenysége a dokumentumok tükrében [A Renaissance Philanthropist Magnate at the 15–16th-Century Transylvania. The Age and Activity of Leonard Barlabássy, Vice-Voivode of Transylvania and Viscount of the Székelys in the Light of the Documents] (in Hungarian). Méry Ratio. ISBN 978-80-89286-81-2.
- C. Tóth, Norbert; Horváth, Richárd; Neumann, Tibor; Pálosfalvi, Tamás (2016). Magyarország világi archontológiája, 1458–1526, I. Főpapok és bárók [Secular Archontology of Hungary, 1458–1526, Volume I: Prelates and Barons] (in Hungarian). MTA Bölcsészettudományi Kutatóközpont Történettudományi Intézete. ISBN 978-963-4160-35-9.
- Engel, Pál (1996). Magyarország világi archontológiája, 1301–1457, I. [Secular Archontology of Hungary, 1301–1457, Volume I] (in Hungarian). História, MTA Történettudományi Intézete. ISBN 963-8312-44-0.
