= Leonard Barlabássy =

Vice-voivode of Transylvania
- Reign: 1501–1525
- Born: c. 1455; Csesztve, Kingdom of Hungary (present-day Cisteiu de Mureș, Romania)
- Died: May/September 1525
- Buried: Fortress Church, Târgu Mureș
- Noble family: House of Barlabássy
- Spouses: 1, Margaret Bogáthy; 2, Magdalene Geréb
- Issue: (1) John V (1) Leonard II (1) Catherine (1) Magdalene (1) Sophia (2) Anne (2) Farkas I (2) Barbara (2) Euphrosyne
- Father: John II
- Mother: N Erdélyi (?)

Leonard Barlabássy de Héderfája (Hungarian: héderfájai Barlabássy Lénárd; c. 1455 – May/September 1525) was a Hungarian nobleman at the turn of the 15th and 16th centuries, who served as Vice-voivode of Transylvania from 1501 to 1525.

== Family and early life ==
Leonard Barlabássy (also Barlabassy or Barlabási) was born around 1455 into a Transylvanian noble family. His father was John II, the castellan of Gyulafehérvár (present-day Alba Iulia, Romania). Leonard had two brothers, John III and Michael II. They also had a stepbrother, the famous Humanist poet and pilgrim John Lászai. The centre of the family landholdings located in Csesztve (today part of Ocna Mureș town in Romania), where Leonard was born too. It is possible that his mother was an unidentified noblewoman from the illustrious Erdélyi de Somkerék family.

Through the intercession of his father, the young Leonard had the opportunity to serve as a royal page in the court of Matthias Corvinus, King of Hungary. There, he became acquainted with the Renaissance arts and Humanist scholarship. Following that, he became a familiaris of Stephen Báthory, a successful military general and the most powerful baron in Transylvania since the 1470s. Leonard was first mentioned by a contemporary record of the Kolozsmonostor Abbey on 5 January 1492; the document styled him as "egrerius" (knightly noble), which implies that Leonard participated in several of Báthory's military campaigns against the Ottomans, although there are no explicit sources about his possible military career.

By the early 16th century, Leonard and his brothers possessed extensive landholdings throughout in Transylvania, mainly in Kolozs, Doboka, Torda, Fehér and Küküllő counties, in addition to the Székely seat of Marosszék. John and Leonard bought the lower part of Miklóslaka (Micoșlaca) from Emeric Tőki de Lóna in January 1492. According to a lawsuit from July 1498, the brothers and their children unlawfully acquired the whole settlement by that time. Leonard was granted the estates of Ózd (Ozd) and Táté (Totoi) by King Vladislaus II of Hungary in a lawsuit of 1492 against Ladislaus Geréb, the Bishop of Transylvania. John and Leonard bought the villages of Héderfája (Idrifaia) and Mikefalva (Mica) from the Farkas de Harina family in March 1495. In addition, they also acquired portions of Somostelke (Șomoștelnic), Kápolna (Căpâlna de Sus) and Cserged (Cergău) in Küküllő County. As a familiaris of Stephen Báthory, the Barlabássy brothers gradually increased their influence in Transylvania, sometimes abusing their power. According to a complaint to the royal court in 1493, they unlawfully forced privileged Székely communities to pay local taxes in Sepsiszék (another seat in Székely Land). The Diocese of Transylvania also sent a complaint to Vladislaus II in 1500; accordingly, Leonard and his brothers refused to pay tithe in their landholdings regarding the year 1499.

== Career ==
Leonard Barlabássy was appointed Vice-voivode of Transylvania in 1501. In this capacity, he functioned as a substitute of Voivode Peter Szentgyörgyi, who also held the dignity of Judge royal since 1500, thus he was staying in Transylvania infrequently following that. Barlabássy retained his position during the term of the next voivode, John Zápolya too, who was also a close political ally of his predecessor, Szentgyörgyi. During Barlabássy's extremely long office-holding (24 years), several Hungarian nobles simultaneously held the office of vice-voivode alongside him: Paul Magyi (1502–1503), Benedict Túri (1505–1507), Ladislaus Czertinger (1505–1508), Nicholas Túróci (1512–1516), Nicholas Hagymás de Berekszó (1517–1519), Stephen Báthory de Somlyó (1521–1522) and Stephen Tomori de Csúcs (1523–1525). Barlabássy was also referred to as Viscount of the Székelys during his first appearance as vice-voivode on 7 June 1501. By that time, the former dignity of Count of the Székelys was an accessory title to the dignity of Voivode of Transylvania (except the years 1504–1507). Beside that, Barlabássy was also styled himself as ispán (comes) of Görgény (today Gurghiu, Romania) in his letter with the date 22 July 1504. The title means that Barlabássy acted as castellan of Görgény Castle (official seat of the counts of the Székelys).

Barlabássy built a Renaissance-style country-house in Héderfája in 1508, which was elevated into the status of his official residence. Based on the sources, it is plausible that he bought the portions of his brothers and exclusively owned the settlement alone by that time. Barlabássy exercised the performance of his administrative and judicial duties from here, therefore contemporary sources began to call him "Barlabassy de Hederfaya", while his brothers, John and Michael and their descendants were continued to refer with the prefix "Chezthwe" (Csesztve). He also possessed another country-house in Ózd. Altogether 363 charters were preserved, which contained the activity of Barlabássy as vice-voivode. He had a professional personal staff, who were employed in the chancellery. His personal notaries were Simon Keresztúri (1501) and Ambrose Szucsáki (1520–1525). One of his documents, issued on 17 July 1507, is the first of the contemporary documents, which mentions the name of György Dózsa de Makfalva, who later led a nationwide a peasants' revolt against the magnates. According to Barlabássy's letter, Dózsa and his soldiers robbed and murdered some local Saxon traders near Hermannstadt (present-day Sibiu, Romania). After John Zápolya was appointed voivode, Barlabássy became a member of his inner advisory council, alongside, for instance, Stephen Werbőczy, Michael Szobi and Nicholas Bethlen.

The Ottomans began invading the southern frontier of the Kingdom of Hungary in April 1511. Zápolya ordered the city council of Bistritz (Bistrița) to gather their armies and sent them under the command of Barlabássy in June 1511, who repeated his overlord's command in 1512. Alongside his co-vice-voivode Nicholas Túróci and other lords, Barlabássy invited the Saxon communities to attend a general diet summoned to Hermannstadt in 1513. Barlabássy participated in the suppression of the 1514 peasant revolt, led by Dózsa. His army, composing of Székely and Saxon troops, joined John Tornallyai's garrison, stationed near Kolozsvár (Cluj-Napoca). On 29 June, he instructed Fabian, judge of Bistritz to send gunpowder to the castle of Görgény. Barlabássy's banderium clashed with the insurgent troops of friar Lawrence Mészáros, Dózsa's lieutenant at the walls of Kolozsvár. Amid brutal retaliations, which followed Dózsa's revolt, Barlabássy sent an unusual letter to the council of Beszterce on 11 February 1515, in which he instructed any former insurgents should be granted amnesty and put them back into the service of their former lords. The suppression of the revolt strengthened Zápolya's political positions. Barlabássy supported his efforts without question. He declared the general assemblies of Székelys, which were held without the consent of the Count of the Székelys (i.e. Zápolya) as unlawful and invalid, and forbade the Székely communities from attendance. Barlabássy acquired several villages and lands during his 24-year term as vice-voivode. For instance, he was granted the village of Csüdőtelke (Cuștelnic) by Martin Erdélyi for his long-time support and friendship in 1517. He also acquired some portions at Mezőszengyel (Sânger) in 1522.

== Patron of arts ==
Leonard Barlabássy was known to have been a patron of arts, who contributed significantly to the spread of the Renaissance in Transylvania. He bequeathed different sums to several ecclesiastical institutions and monasteries. For instance, he handed over the church of Segesvár (Sighișoara) to the Dominican Order. He also financially supported a Humanist scholar circle in Gyulafehérvár, which centered around its bishop Ladislaus Geréb and the clergymen (including his nephew John IV). His coat-of-arms, which depicts a bison head with a dragon biting its own tail and the insignia of Sun and Moon, can be found in the cathedral of Gyulafehérvár and the church of Székelydálya (Daia). He supported the expansion and reconstruction of the latter church with monetary donations. Barlabássy held the right of patronage over the Fortress Church at Székelyvásárhely (Târgu Mureș). Its frescoes, which survived in fragments, depicts the legend of St. Leonard of Noblac. According to art historian Lajos Kelemen, its donator was Leonard Barlabássy.

Art historian Jolán Balogh emphasized the country-house of Héderfája is the earliest surviving Renaissance-style building in the province of Transylvania, excluding the reconstructions of some royal castles. Barlabássy's stepbrother, John Lászai erected a Renaissance-style chapel in Gyulafehérvár around the same time. A stone lintel at Héderfája preserved the date of the construction of the country-house (1508) and Barlabássy's coat-of-arms and its subscription, which depicts Italian calligraphic style. Its condition gradually deteriorated into annihilation after the Romanian Revolution. It was restored in 2009.

== Personal life ==
Leonard Barlabássy married Margaret Bogáti de Radnót, the daughter of Stephen Bogáti and Helena Farkas de Harina. Their marriage produces five children: John V, Leonard II, Catherine, Magdalene and Sophia. After the death of his first wife at an unknown time, Barlabássy married Magdalene Geréb de Vingárt, who came from a prominent Transylvanian noble family of Saxon origin. They had four children: Anne, Farkas I, Barbara and Euphrosyne. Barlabásy's daughters were engaged to local nobles from prominent families. For instance, Magdalene became the wife of Gregory Erdélyi de Somkerék, while Sophia married to Nicholas III Vízaknai. Leonard provided for the proper education of his sons; in his last will he forbade his adult sons – John V and Leonard II – not to interrupt their university studies in any way. John V attended the University of Kraków in 1527, and was a schoolmate of János Sylvester.

Barlabássy compiled his last will and testament on 28 January 1525 in Héderfája. He was last mentioned as a living person on 8 May 1525. He died by 29 September 1525. In accordance with his last will, Barlabássy was buried in the Fortress Church of Székelyvásárhely. His large wealth and extensive possessions were distributed among his sons and grandsons in the following decades, according to his division of property diploma issued on 2 February 1521, which was presented to John Zápolya.

== Sources ==
- Barabássy, Sándor (2012). Egy reneszánsz mecénás főúr a 15–16. századi Erdélyben. Barlabássy Lénárd erdélyi alvajda, székely alispán kora és tevékenysége a dokumentumok tükrében [A Renaissance Philanthropist Magnate at the 15–16th-Century Transylvania. The Age and Activity of Leonard Barlabássy, Vice-Voivode of Transylvania and Viscount of the Székelys in the Light of the Documents] (in Hungarian). Méry Ratio. ISBN 978-80-89286-81-2.
- C. Tóth, Norbert; Horváth, Richárd; Neumann, Tibor; Pálosfalvi, Tamás (2016). Magyarország világi archontológiája, 1458–1526, I. Főpapok és bárók [Secular Archontology of Hungary, 1458–1526, Volume I: Prelates and Barons] (in Hungarian). MTA Bölcsészettudományi Kutatóközpont Történettudományi Intézete. ISBN 978-963-4160-35-9.
- W. Kovács, András (2012). "Remarks on the Careers of the Vice-voivodes of Transylvania in the Late Middle Ages (1458–1526)". Transylvanian Review. 21 (Suppl. no. 2). Romanian Cultural Foundation: 103–138. ISSN 1221-1249.
