= János Barlabássy =

Hungarian prelate (1482–1560)

- Bishop of Csanád
- Installed: 1537
- Term ended: 1552
- Predecessor: Giovanni Bonzagno
- Successor: Ferenc Székely

Personal details
- Born: 1482 Csesztve, Kingdom of Hungary (present-day Cisteiu de Mureș, Romania)
- Died: 1560 (aged 77–78)
- Denomination: Roman Catholic
- Parents: János (III) Barlabássy
- Education: University of Vienna; University of Bologna

János Barlabássy de Csesztve (Hungarian: csesztvei Barlabássy János; 1482–1560) was a Hungarian prelate in the first half of the 16th century. As a loyal partisan of King John Zápolya, he served as de facto the last Bishop of Csanád between 1537 and 1552, before the Ottoman Empire conquered the southern parts of the Kingdom of Hungary, including the whole territory of the diocese.

== Early life ==
János (IV) was born into a Transylvanian noble family in Csesztve, Kingdom of Hungary (present-day Cisteiu de Mureș, Romania) in 1482. His father was János III, whose brother Lénárd was an influential magnate and patron of arts in Transylvania at the turn of the 15th and 16th centuries. His mother was the first unidentified wife of his father. János also had several siblings, Mihály III, Gergely, Katalin and Zsófia, in addition to half-siblings Ferenc I and János VI (from their father's second marriage).

Some of the members of his family (for instance, his grandfather János II and uncle Lénárd) financially supported that Humanist scholar circle, which centered around Gyulafehérvár (Alba Iulia). His deeply religious father intended his secondborn namesake son for an ecclesiastical career. His education was determined by the influence of the Humanist-Renaissance intellectual trend. According to a contemporary record, János attended the University of Vienna in 1505. Here he met and befriended with Bohemian-born historian and poet Stephanus Taurinus, who later moved to Hungary due to this relationship. János continued his studies at the University of Bologna by 19 October 1508. He was already a canon of the cathedral chapter of Gyulafehérvár during that time. Barlabássy was first styled as magister by a document issued in 1517. Some historians claimed he also attended the University of Kraków in 1527, but it is plausible that data concerns to his namesake cousin (Lénárd's son). Joining the local Humanist circle, Barlabássy financially supported the construction of the Lazo chapel within the St. Michael's Cathedral of Gyulafehérvár, built by his relative János Lászai. His coat-of-arms, which depicted a bison head could be found on the main ledge of the northern main facade (disappeared during later renovations).

== Ecclesiastical career ==
Beside his rank of canon at the cathedral chapter of Transylvania, Barlabássy was elevated into the church offices of archdeacon of Szentkirály and Gombás (present-day Sâncrai and Gâmbaș, respectively) by 19 September 1518, when bought portions and a mill at Csombord (Ciumbrud). Barlabássy served as archdeacon–canon of Gyulafehérvár from 1504 to 1534. Together with his family, Barlabássy was a long-time partisan of Voivode John Zápolya, who governed Transylvania since 1510. The voivode instructed János and his brother Mihály in December 1512 to hand over the paternal property belonging to their step-mother Magdolna Erdélyi (their father's widow) and her children. Following the Battle of Mohács, when the Ottoman Empire crushed the Hungarian royal army and King Louis II was killed, Barlabássy attended that diet in Székesfehérvár, which had proclaimed Zápolya as King of Hungary on 10 November 1526. A month later, Zápolya's rival Ferdinand of Habsburg was also elected king by another diet summoned in Pressburg (Bratislava).

Following the death of Giovanni Bonzagno, King John Zápolya and his spouse, Queen Isabella Jagiellon appointed János Barlabássy as Bishop of Csanád in 1537. The diocese laid in the frontier zone between Zápolya's realm (in historiography, also known as the Eastern Hungarian Kingdom) and the Ottoman Empire. Barlabássy was a protegee of Bishop George Martinuzzi, King John Zápolya's most powerful advisor. Martinuzzi reserved for himself the administration and finances (taxes) of the diocese because of the military situation, overshadowing Barlabássy's episcopate (as a result, earlier historiographical works considered mistakenly that Martinuzzi, who served as Bishop of Várad, was also Bishop of Csanád during that time). Pope Paul III confirmed Barlabássy's appointment on 30 May 1539. Having regard to Barlabássy's "merits and virtues", the pope sent the deed of approval with papal legate and chamberlain Hieronymus Rorarius on 29 June 1539. Pope Paul also instructed Cardinal Girolamo Aleandro to explain the reason for the confirmations of Barlabássy and other pro-John bishops to Ferdinand, who resented the decision of the Roman Curia. As an atonement, Pope Paul III decided to spend procuratio (appointment fee) on maintaining the southern military frontier castle system along the border with the Ottoman Empire.

John Zápolya died on 22 July 1540. George Martinuzzi and Queen Isabella secured the infant John Sigismund's inheritance, which violated the Treaty of Várad, concluded between Ferdinand and John two years earlier. Ferdinand requested the pope to instruct the pro-Zápolya bishops – including Barlabássy – to acknowledge Ferdinand as the sole rightful ruler in accordance with the treaty. However, Barlabássy and other prelates remained partisans of the Zápolya family and Martinuzzi. In response, Ferdinand I did not recognize Barlabássy's legitimacy and appointed a Transdanubian clergyman Ferenc Ugody as Bishop of Csanád on 26 August 1540. During that time, there were several dioceses in Hungary, where two rival and co-claimant bishops were appointed to their positions simultaneously.

Barlabássy resided most of his tenure as bishop in Gyulafehérvár, his position was merely titular due to George Martinuzzi's influence over the Diocese of Csanád. King Ferdinand sought to convince Barlabássy to become his confidant, in order to divide the unity of John Sigismund's party. In July 1542, his royal document styled Barlabássy as "Bishop of Csanád" and assured him to confirm that privileges, inaugurations and donations which were made by the late John Zápolya in favor of the bishop. Barlabássy remained a supporter of Queen Isabella and John Sigismund. He attended the diet at Torda (Turda) on 1 August 1544. According to Martinuzzi's record from February 1550, Barlabássy had various lawsuits with nobleman Miklós Forró. The litigation process took place in Radnót (Iernut). Martinuzzi forced Isabella to renounce her son's realm in exchange for two Silesian duchies in 1551. John Sigismund and his mother settled in Poland. Martinuzzi was murdered in late 1551 upon the order of Ferdinand. To prevent the unification of the Kingdom of Hungary under a sole monarch, the Ottoman Empire launched a large-scale military campaign against the realm in 1552. The Turks invaded and occupied the southern parts of the kingdom, including the whole territory of the Diocese of Csanád, which de facto ceased to exist. Ferdinand I, who was left without a rival for the throne of Hungary until 1556, deprived Barlabássy from his position in 1552. He appointed Ferenc Székely as Bishop of Csanád in the following year. Barlabássy remained in Gyulafehérvár in the subsequent years, but was forced to leave the town due to the spread of Calvinism in 1556. The former bishop retired to his family estates, where he died in 1560, at the age of 77 or 78.

== Sources ==
- Barabássy, Sándor (2012). Egy reneszánsz mecénás főúr a 15–16. századi Erdélyben. Barlabássy Lénárd erdélyi alvajda, székely alispán kora és tevékenysége a dokumentumok tükrében [A Renaissance Philanthropist Magnate at the 15–16th-Century Transylvania. The Age and Activity of Leonard Barlabássy, Vice-Voivode of Transylvania and Viscount of the Székelys in the Light of the Documents] (in Hungarian). Méry Ratio. ISBN 978-80-89286-81-2.
- Haraszti Szabó, Péter; Kelényi, Borbála (2019). Magyarországi diákok francia, angol, itáliai és német egyetemeken a középkorban, 1100–1526 [Students from Hungary at the Universities of France, England, Italy and Germany in the Middle Ages 1100–1526] (in Hungarian). ELTE Egyetemi Könyvtár és Levéltár; MTA ELTE Egyetemtörténeti Kutatócsoport. ISBN 978-963-489-098-0.
- Juhász, Kálmán (1947). A csanádi püspökség története (1500–1552). [The History of the Diocese of Csanád (1500–1552)] (in Hungarian). Csanádvármegyei Könyvtár 43.

Catholic Church titles
Preceded by Giovanni Bonzagno	Bishop of Csanád contested by Ferenc Ugody; 1537–1552	Succeeded by Ferenc Székely
