= Războieni =

Războieni may refer to the following places in Romania:

- Castra of Războieni-Cetate, a fort in the Roman province of Dacia
- Războieni, a commune in Neamț County, and its village Războienii de Jos
- Războieni, a village in Casimcea commune, Tulcea County
- Războieni, a village in Ion Neculce commune, Iași County
- Răsboieni, a village in Țibănești commune, Iași County
- Războieni-Cetate, a village administered by Ocna Mureș town, Alba County

It is also the name of a military unit:

- 151st Infantry Battalion "Războieni" of the 4th Territorial Army Corps of the Romanian Land Forces active from at least 1941 to 2000
