= Ferenc Barlabássy =

Hungarian nobleman

- Born: c. 1540; Alparét, Kingdom of Hungary (present-day Bobâlna, Romania)
- Died: 1599; Alparét, Principality of Transylvania
- Noble family: House of Barlabássy
- Spouse: unidentified
- Issue: unidentified
- Father: Mihály IV
- Mother: Katalin Tomori

Ferenc Barlabássy de Alparét (Hungarian: alparéti Barlabássy Ferenc; killed 1599) was a Hungarian nobleman in the second half of the 16th century, who was active in the Principality of Transylvania. He was a supporter of Gáspár Bekes, a claimant to throne of Transylvania in the 1570s.

== Family ==
Ferenc (III) was born into a wealthy Transylvanian noble family as the son of Mihály IV Barlabássy (born 1515) and Katalin Tomori, daughter of István Tomori, the Vice-voivode of Transylvania from 1523 to 1526 and from 1528 to 1531, and niece of Pál Tomori, commander-in-chief of the Hungarian army in the Battle of Mohács in 1526, where he was killed. Mihály and his family lived in Alparét (present-day Bobâlna, Romania), where his ancestors erected a country-house. Ferenc was also born there around 1540.

== Career ==
After his father, Mihály died in 1555, Ferenc became the last offspring of the Barlabássy's senior branch, descending from his great-grandfather János III. Therefore, he inherited large-scale landholdings throughout Transylvania, including Csíkfalva (Vărgata) and Kutyfalva (Cuci). Ferenc Barlabássy supported the policy of John Sigismund Zápolya, King-elect of Hungary and later the first Prince of Transylvania. Under his influence, Barlabássy was one of those Transylvanian lords, who converted to Unitarianism from Roman Catholicism in the 1560s.

John Sigismund died in 1571. The Transylvanian Diet elected the Roman Catholic lord, Stephen Báthory as his successor with the title of voivode. Gáspár Bekes, also sponsored by Emperor Maximilian II contested the election. Barlabássy supported the claim of Bekes, a fellow Unitarian. Bekes gathered his army and organized a rebellion against Báthory. Barlabássy joined his army, leading the troops of the Székelys of Marosszék. In his letter to captain László Radák in 1575, Bekes called Barlabássy as head of all Székelys within his party. Ferenc Barlabássy was isolated in his family due to his political orientation. The members of the younger branch of his kinship, descending from Vice-voivode Lénárd Barlabássy, were considered partisans of Stephen Báthory, primarily Farkas Barlabássy, who also owned estates in Székely Land and participated in the civil war in Báthory's retinue. The decisive battle took place near Kerelőszentpál (Sânpaul) on 9 July 1575, where Gáspár Bekes was defeated. Barlabássy gathered his army and was en route to the battlefield, but missed the battle and arrived to the scene one day later.

Supporters of Bekes were brutally suppressed and privileges for the Székelys were suspended. Ferenc Barlabássy sought refuge in the castle of Szatmár (Satu Mare). Along with 32 other lords, he was sentenced to death in absentia and his landholdings and villages were confiscated by a tribunal at the diet of Kolozsvár (Cluj-Napoca) in August 1575. Gáspár Bekes decided to reconcile with Báthory and became his loyal ally and close adviser, when the latter was elected monarch of the Polish–Lithuanian Commonwealth in the spring of 1576. Among other pro-Bekes lords, Barlabássy was granted amnesty and he was able to recover his confiscated lands. He also swore loyalty to Stephen Báthory. Barlabássy remained a partisan of the Báthory family throughout his life but lost all political influence, retiring to his country-house at Alparét. He was also considered a partisan of Prince Sigismund Báthory. When Emperor Rudolf II's military commander Michael the Brave invaded Transylvania in 1599, the province was harassed from pillaging raids made by his unpaid soldiers, while Ottoman marauders made frequent incursions across the frontiers. Ferenc Barlabássy was slaughtered together with his unidentified wife and children, while the country-house at Alparét was looted and destroyed.

== Sources ==
- Barabássy, Sándor (2012). Egy reneszánsz mecénás főúr a 15–16. századi Erdélyben. Barlabássy Lénárd erdélyi alvajda, székely alispán kora és tevékenysége a dokumentumok tükrében [A Renaissance Philanthropist Magnate at the 15–16th-Century Transylvania. The Age and Activity of Leonard Barlabássy, Vice-Voivode of Transylvania and Viscount of the Székelys in the Light of the Documents] (in Hungarian). Méry Ratio. ISBN 978-80-89286-81-2.
- Horn, Ildikó (2009). Hit és hatalom. Az erdélyi unitárius nemesség 16. századi története [Faith and Power. The 16th Century History of the Transylvanian Unitarian Nobility] (in Hungarian). Balassi Kiadó. ISBN 978-963-506-793-0.
