= John Barlabássy =

15th-century nobleman

Castellan of Gyulafehérvár
- Born: c. 1436
- Died: 1509
- Noble family: House of Barlabássy
- Spouse: N Erdélyi (?)
- Issue: John III; Leonard I Michael II; John Lászai (adopted)
- Father: John I
- Mother: Veronica Haranglábi

John Barlabássy de Csesztve (Hungarian: csesztvei Barlabássy János; died 1509) was a Hungarian nobleman in the second half of the 15th century. He was castellan of Gyulafehérvár (present-day Alba Iulia, Romania).

== Family ==
John (II) was born into the Barlabássy (also Barlabási or Barabási) noble family, which possessed landholdings in northeastern Hungary (especially Bereg County). His parents were John (I) and his second wife, Veronica Haranglábi (widow of Emeric Györgyfalvi). He had an elder brother, Michael I. Their mother came from a wealthy Transylvanian noble family. As a dowry, John, Sr. acquired portions in Kolozs and Küküllő counties – including Mócs (Mociu) –, and the Barlabássy family gradually became part of the Transylvanian elite in the second half of the 15th century.

It is possible that John, Jr. married an unidentified noblewoman from the wealthy Erdélyi de Somkerék family. Their marriage produced three children: the eldest one John III was referred to as "homo regius" (the king's vassal) during the reign of Vladislaus II of Hungary. Leonard I was an influential vice-voivode and patron of arts in Transylvania at the turn of the 15th and 16th centuries. His youngest natural son was Michael II, vice-chamberlain of the salt chamber of Szék (Sic) in 1512. John also adopted an orphan, John Lászai, who entered ecclesiastical career and later erected a Renaissance-style chapel in the St. Michael's Cathedral of Gyulafehérvár.

== Career and possessions ==
Michael and John acquired Csesztve (today part of Ocna Mureș town in Romania) and the surrounding lands by the 1450s. They built a country-house there, which became the permanent residence of the Barlabássys. The brothers and their descendants used the prefix "de Chezthwe" (and various other write forms) thereafter. The Csesztve lordship laid along an important trade route near the river Maros (Mureș) and the salt mines of Marosújvár (Ocna Mureș). In the subsequent years, they also bought Csombord (Ciumbrud), Váradja (Oarda), Lomfalva and Marosszentkirály (Sâncraiu de Mureș).

John Barlabássy acted as representative and lawyer of John Geréb in a lawsuit over the property of Bálványos Castle (today ruins near Unguraș) on 22 May 1461. Consequently, he was familiaris of the influential Geréb family by that time. Barlabássy did not join the Transylvanian rebellion against King Matthias Corvinus in 1467, unlike his many relatives (for instance, his aunt Julia Barlabássy). For his loyalty, the monarch appointed him castellan of Gyulafehérvár, an important stronghold in the province, which increased his political influence in the surrounding region. In the 1470s, Barlabássy entered the service of Stephen Báthory, a respected military general and Voivode of Transylvania. He participated in various campaigns and counter-attacks in response to the Ottoman incursions, which constantly harassed and threatened the province of Transylvania. Barlabássy also fought in the Battle of Breadfield on 13 October 1479, belonging to the banderium of Stephen Báthory.

In the 1480s and 1490s, Barlabássy was frequently styled as "homo regius" (i.e. king's vassal), when acted as pristaldus (royal commissioner or "bailiff") in several possession matters on behalf of king Matthias Corvinus, then Vladislaus II. As castellan of Gyulafehérvár, Barlabássy was a dedicated patron of arts and sciences. He and his son, Leonard financially supported a Humanist scholar circle, based in Gyulafehérvár, which helped to spread Renaissance arts, science and architecture throughout Transylvania. He also supported the Roman Catholic Church; he bequeathed his landholdings at Váradja and Lomfalva and his mill and its customs accessories at Sebes to the cathedral chapter of Transylvania in 1501. Barlabássy made his last will and testament in 1508. He died in the next year at a relatively old age by the standard of his time, when some of his grandchildren already reached adulthood. As a result, some contemporary records in the late stages of his life referred to him as "John Barlabássy the Old" (Hungarian: "Öreg" Barlabássy János) to distinguish him from his namesake son and grandson.

== Sources ==
- Barabássy, Sándor (2012). Egy reneszánsz mecénás főúr a 15–16. századi Erdélyben. Barlabássy Lénárd erdélyi alvajda, székely alispán kora és tevékenysége a dokumentumok tükrében [A Renaissance Philanthropist Magnate at the 15–16th-Century Transylvania. The Age and Activity of Leonard Barlabássy, Vice-Voivode of Transylvania and Viscount of the Székelys in the Light of the Documents] (in Hungarian). Méry Ratio. ISBN 978-80-89286-81-2.
