= Pruni =

Pruni may refer to several villages in Romania:

- Pruni, a village in Bobâlna Commune, Cluj County
- Pruni, a village in town of Măgurele, Ilfov County
