= Beregsurány =

Place in Hungary

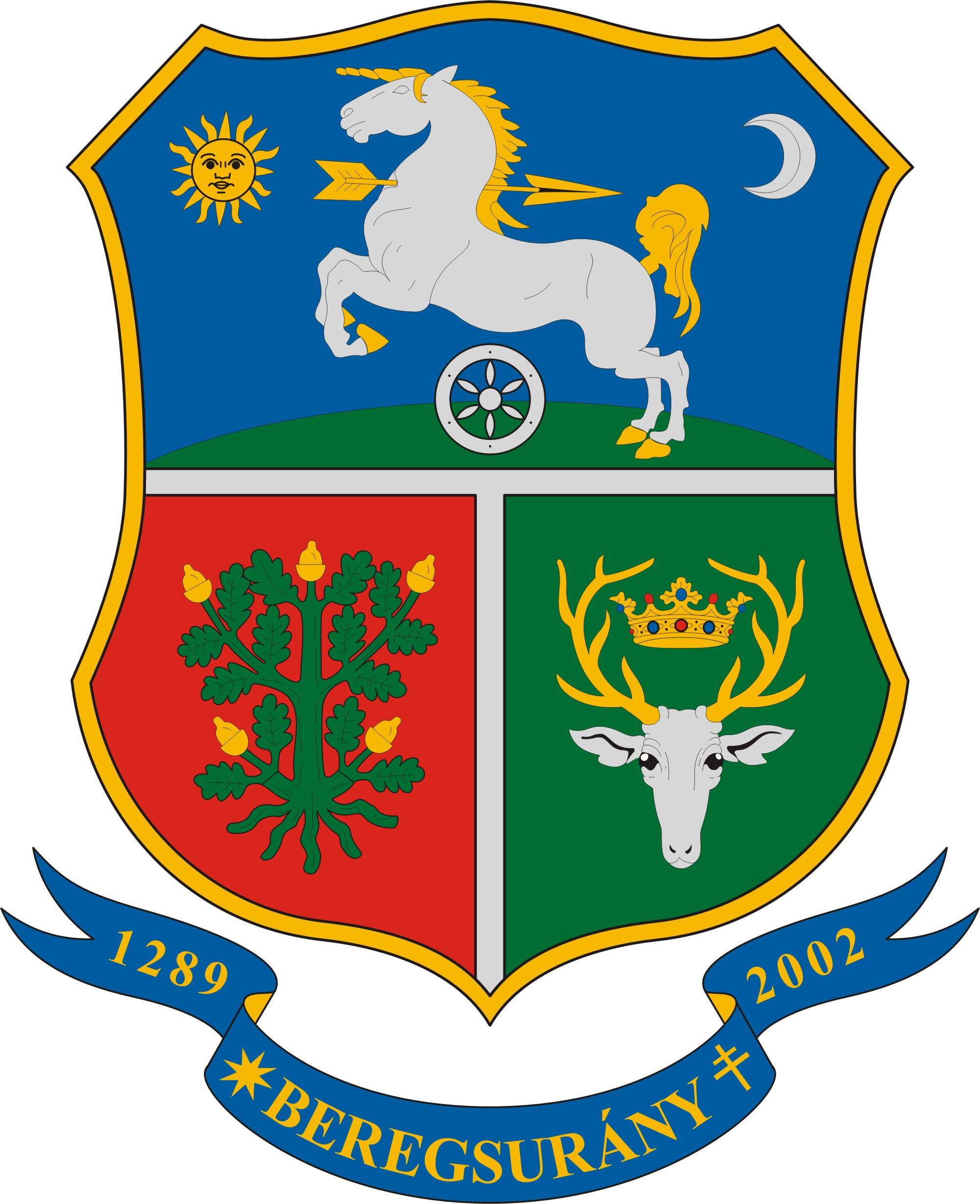
- Coat of arms

- Location of Beregsurány Beregsurány (Hungary)
- Coordinates: 48°10′0″N 22°33′0″E
- Country: Hungary
- County: Szabolcs-Szatmár-Bereg

Area
  - Total: 16.00 km^{2} (6.18 sq mi)

Population (2008)
  - Total: 640
  - Density: 40/km^{2} (100/sq mi)
- Time zone: UTC+1 (CET)
  - Summer (DST): UTC+2 (CEST)
- Postal code: 4933
- Area code: 45

Location of Szabolcs-Szatmar-Bereg county in Hungary

Beregsurány is a village in Szabolcs-Szatmár-Bereg county, in the Northern Great Plain region of eastern Hungary.

== Geography ==
It covers an area of 16 km^{2} (6 sq mi) and has a population of 636 people (2001).

== Position ==
Beregsurany can be reached through the road 4127, lying on the northern side of the international Hungarian–Ukrainian border crossing point, about 70 km from Nyíregyháza, the center of the county.

== Origin of the name ==
The prefix Bereg means 'belonging to the long-ago Bereg shire', the origin of the Surany forename is maybe the Slavish 'Su ran' family name, or the ancient Turkish magistracy 'cur'.

== History ==
Until 1911, the village was called simple Surany. The current settlement is melted from the smaller villages Nagysurany and Kissurany. The settlement was the residency of the family Suranyi originated from the genum of Gutkeled or family Vardai.

From 1280, there was a tough hostility between Aladar (son of Mihaly) and Tamas (son of Gabor). In 1299 the family Vardai owned the settlement, that time called Egyhazassurany.

In 1345 Janos Suranyi and his son, Tamas, has litigated with Janos Kisvardai for the countryside border-land between Marok and Surany. Nagy- and Kissurany was owned in the 14th century by the families Nagysuranyi, Kissuranyi, Medgyes and Csepan (from Barabas).

In 1496 Kissurany was recorded as praedium, that is desert. In 1567 Tartars have ruined and burned Nagysurany, dragging the population away.

Charters from 1648 mention Istvan Telegdi, Gabor Perneszi, the widow of Menyhert Lonyay, Zsigmond Ujfalusi, Zsigmond and Gabor Perenyi, Gabor Barkoczi and Adam Dessewffy as proprietaries.

In 1651 Katalin Bornemissza (the widow of Gyorgy Perenyi and Ferenc Kallay), her descendants, further, Istvan Salyi and his wife Zsuzsanna Fulo became proprietaries, as well.

In 1729 Istvan, Mihaly and Eva Bay Ludanyi and in 1807 Istvan Bay became owners of areas near Surany. In 1822 Jozsef and Karoly Bay had properties there, and after 50 years, mrs Gyorgy Bay, Ferenc, Jozsef and Erzsebet Bay, baron Gyula Uray, Gabor Lonyay and Jeno Eotvos had aesthetical residences there.

(The family Bay (originated from shire Nograd) has settled in Surany through marriage in the 17th century, although the heads of the family are mentioned among the "illustrious men" of shire Bereg. Specially Mihaly Bay was the wice leader of the shire, who left the country with Imre Tokholy and lived in Asia, leaving his goods to his brother Andras. In his last will and testament, Tokholy bequeathed a patrician courtyard to Mihaly Bay. Mihaly Bay redeemed the courtyard at Rakoczi Ferenc II, in this contract Rakoczi enumerated the merits Mihaly Bay reached by serving Ilona Zrinyi and Imre Thököly.)

The military descriptors of shire Bereg between 1782 and 1825 found a swampy forest of oaks, birches and beech. The roads and meadows were also swampy, good hay could be collected only in the sparse woods beside the closest settlement Asztély. In the east from the village, the highway was forked, the branch going to Munkacs had hard ground, was quiet wide in the forest and carried just next to Surany. The one going through the village went to Beregszasz, the third one, going to Vári was lesser-busy since its poor state. However, the road coming from Tarpa was hardly viable in rainy weather.

The Geographian Dictionary written by Elek Fényes describes Surany as a Hungarian-Slovak/Slovenian village in the shire Bereg, having 617 inhabitants, many woods and fat fields. In the monography of the sire Bereg written 30 years later, it is mentioned as a Hungarian settlement in the region Tiszahát, near the road to Namény, having 104 dwelling-houses, 686 inhabitants and 2630 acres of countryside. (In its flat countryside many brazen finds were found and said to be from the ancient times, like in 1879 on the fields of Gyula Uray, more than 40 brazen armlets and a lance was unearthed in a mug. Near the streamlet Mic sometime there was a fortress, probably an earth stronghold called Varszeg. In the 13th century Pazmanyfolde settlement lay in the lower border of the shire Bereg, near Surany and Marok, named after its first proprietary, genum Hunt-Pazman.)

=== The Jewish community ===
Jews lived in the village for many years. In 1938, after the publication of the "Jewish laws" intended to restrict the Jews in the fields of economy and society, all the local Jews were detained in one house for ten days on charges of "treason", and the licenses to maintain a tavern and sell essentials were confiscated.

In 1941, all the Jews who had doubts about their Hungarian citizenship were deported.

On 20 April 1944, after the Germans entered Hungary, the jewelry and cash held by Jews were confiscated. The next day they were taken to a brick factory in Berehove. On 20 May they were taken to the Auschwitz extermination camp.

== Local Curiosities ==
Mihaly Nagyszolosi ecclesiastical writer was the Roman Catholic priest of the village in the second half of the 17th century.

Gyorgy Bay was born in 1792 in Surany and in 1815 he became a bodyguard of Maria Theresa. During his residence in Vienna he got known Karoly Kisfaludy and due to his influence, Gyorgy Bay began rhyming. In 1820 he moved back in Surany, corresponding with Ferenc Kazinczy and besides rhyming, he dealt with translations of poems and romans, as well.

== Nationalities ==
In 2001, almost 100% of the inhabitants professed to be Hungarian.

== Sights ==
Under Rakoczi street 2, the art relic reformed church can be found. According to the first notes from 1299, it was probably a wooden church, since the current one was built from stones in the second half of the 14th century. The main room and the much lower, groined cross vaulted sanctuary is built in gothic style, to the edges of the sanctum, two-divided pillars are leaning from outside. In the western room wooden balcony can be found, above the peaked triumphal arch the year 1715 can be read. Under the lime coating of the northern wall, murals from the middle-ages are hiding.

The sitting chamber arises from the 14th century, the furniture, including the stone pulpit with carved sounding board originates from the 18th century, with demotic baroque decorations.

The church was renovated in 1715 and 1779, in 1828, judge Karoly Bay had made build the charnel-house of the family, just in front of the chairs of the patrons.

The tower of the church and the building afore it, comes from the 19th century. On the uppermost floor of the three storeyed tower four arch-type window can be found. The cap with clock shelf has shuttered windowless on each side of it.

On the left side of the road going through the settlement, under Arpad street 115, nice sight is waiting for foreigners. The sometime Bay-castle is one of the rare art-relic barque mansions of the Bereg county. Based on its style-marks, the garrett-roofed mansion standing on high footing was built in the end of the 18th century, or beginning of the 19th century. Probably the family Bay had made build it. In Surany they had a wooden mansion already in the last third of the 17th century. For a long time, the kindergarten of the local government was operating in it. In 2006, it went through a full renovation, currently it is standing empty.

Under Rakoczi street 1., in a large park can be seen the arc-relic sometime Uray-castle. The building was made built by the family Uray in the middle of the 19th century. The one-storied building has portico closed with tympanum on both the front and garden side frontage. Its exterior and interior is also simple with romantic details. It is the propriety of the local government, currently the mayor's office is operating in it.

The memorial of World War II can be seen in the park of the Uray-castle, (which is called today Bárókert). In the village a private collection of local history can be found.
