= János Lászai =

Hungarian poet (1448–1523)

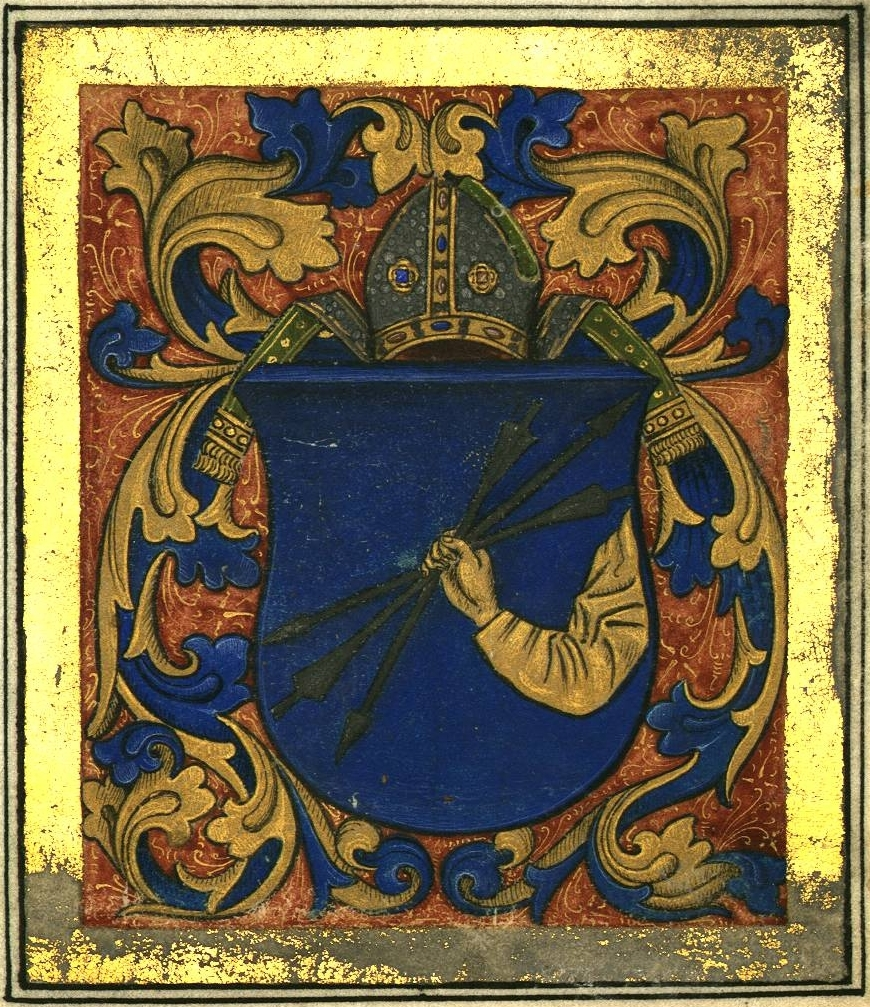
- Coat-of-arms of János Lászai (1489)
- Born: 1448; Lázó, Torna County, Kingdom of Hungary
- Died: 17 August 1523 (aged 74–75); Rome, Papal States
- Resting place: Santo Stefano Rotondo
- Occupations: Poet, clergyman

János Lászai (also Lazói or Lázói, Latin: Johannes de Lazo, English: John Lazinus; 1448 – 17 August 1523) was a Hungarian Humanist poet and clergyman.

== Life ==
He was born in 1448 in Lázó or Lászó, Torna County, the territory of present-day Hungary (now an uninhabited area between Perkupa and Szőlősardó). His parentage is unknown, he was orphaned early. His family had kinship relations with the Sánkfalvis. He was adopted by Transylvanian nobleman John Barlabássy, who served as castellan of Gyulafehérvár (Alba Iulia). One of his stepbrothers was Leonard Barlabássy, an influential magnate and vice-voivode. Lászai's tutor was Anthony Sánkfalvi, who later became Bishop of Nyitra (Nitra). Following that, he attended a university in Italy. He returned to Hungary with the title of "magister" in the 1470s.

According to contemporary records, he was an excellent orator and poet, understood mathematics and spoke Latin, Italian, Greek and "Slavic" beside his native Hungarian (but "knowing not one word of German", as Felix Fabri emphasized). He became a prominent member of that Transylvanian Humanist scholar circle, which based in Gyulafehérvár under the guidance of Bishop Ladislaus Geréb (a cousin of King Matthias Corvinus). Lászai entered ecclesiastical career, he was elevated into the offices of canon of Gyulafehérvár and archdeacon of Telegd (Tileagd).

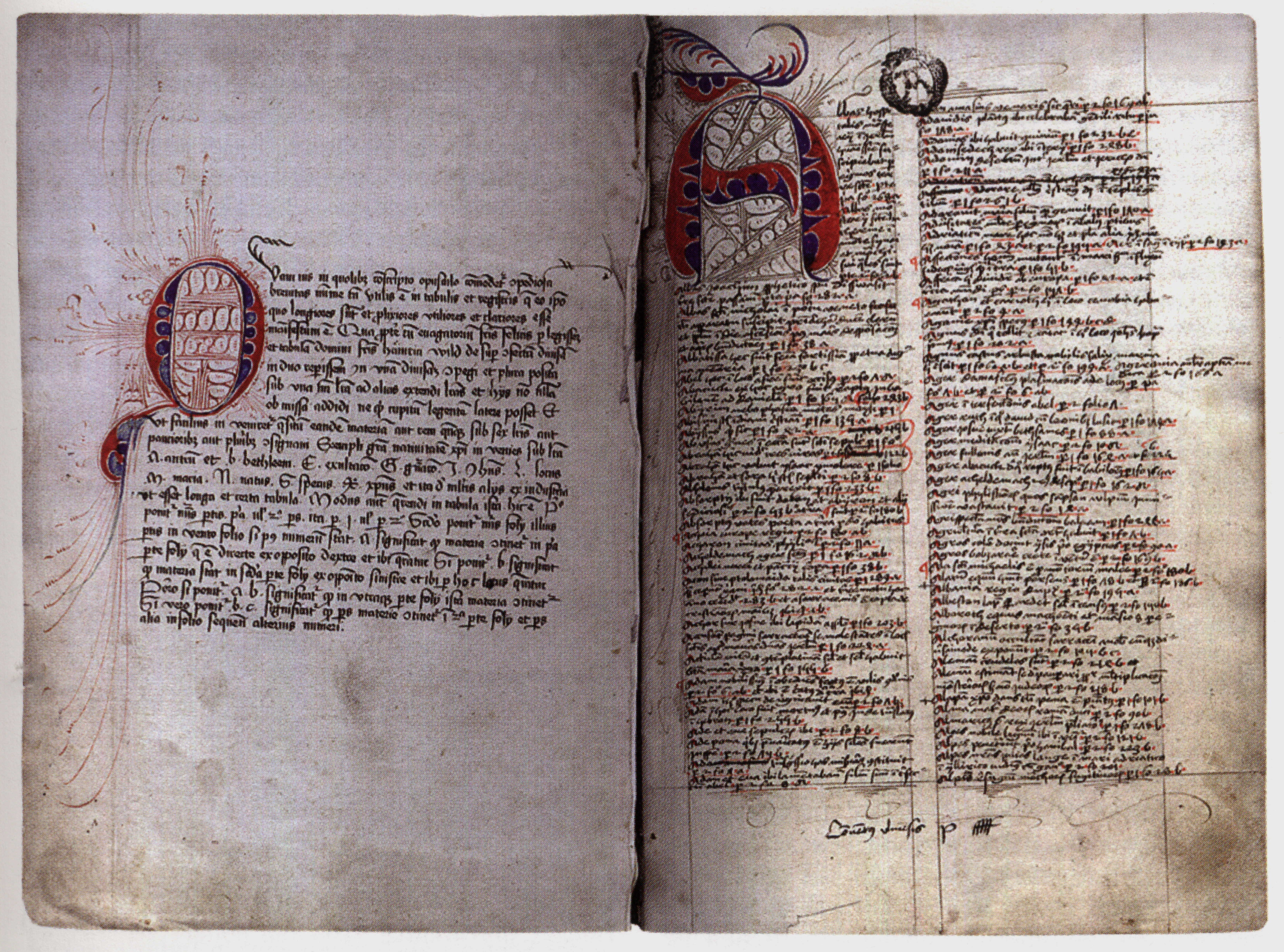
A page of Felix Fabri's Evagatorium, in which Lászai was frequently mentioned

Upon the invitation of Dominican friar Felix Fabri, his former roommate in Italy, Lászai traveled to Jerusalem as a pilgrim in 1483 with three large groups of companions. Fabri documented their pilgrimage in his work "Fratris Felicis Fabri Evagatorium in Terræ Sanctæ, Arabiæ et Egypti peregrinationem", who belonged to the same group with Lászai and four other travelers. He described Lászai as a highly worthy person and "pure-bred Hungarian". Leaving in early June 1483 and arriving back in January 1484, they traveled first to Venice, where they stayed for three weeks. They then took ship for Corfu, Modon and Rhodes - all still Venetian possessions. After Jerusalem and Bethlehem and other sights of the Holy Land, they went to Mount Sinai and Cairo. According to Fabri's account, Lászai improvised a poem in honor of St. Catherine at the Saint Catherine's Monastery. In Cairo, he preached to "infelicitous Hungarian Mamluks" (Hungarian-origin slaves, who were abducted during Ottoman incursions). He also missionized, solemnized, and Christianized these people. These Hungarian Mamluks guided the pilgrims around Cairo, Old Cairo and Giza. After taking a boat down the Nile to Rosetta, the pilgrims took ship back to Venice. Historian Lajos Tardy considered it is possible that Lászai also fulfilled some kind of diplomatic mission in Egypt on behalf of his monarch, Matthias, when the travelers appeared in the court of Qaitbay, Sultan of Egypt. Both monarchs fought against the Ottoman Empire, and there were existing diplomatic relationships between them.

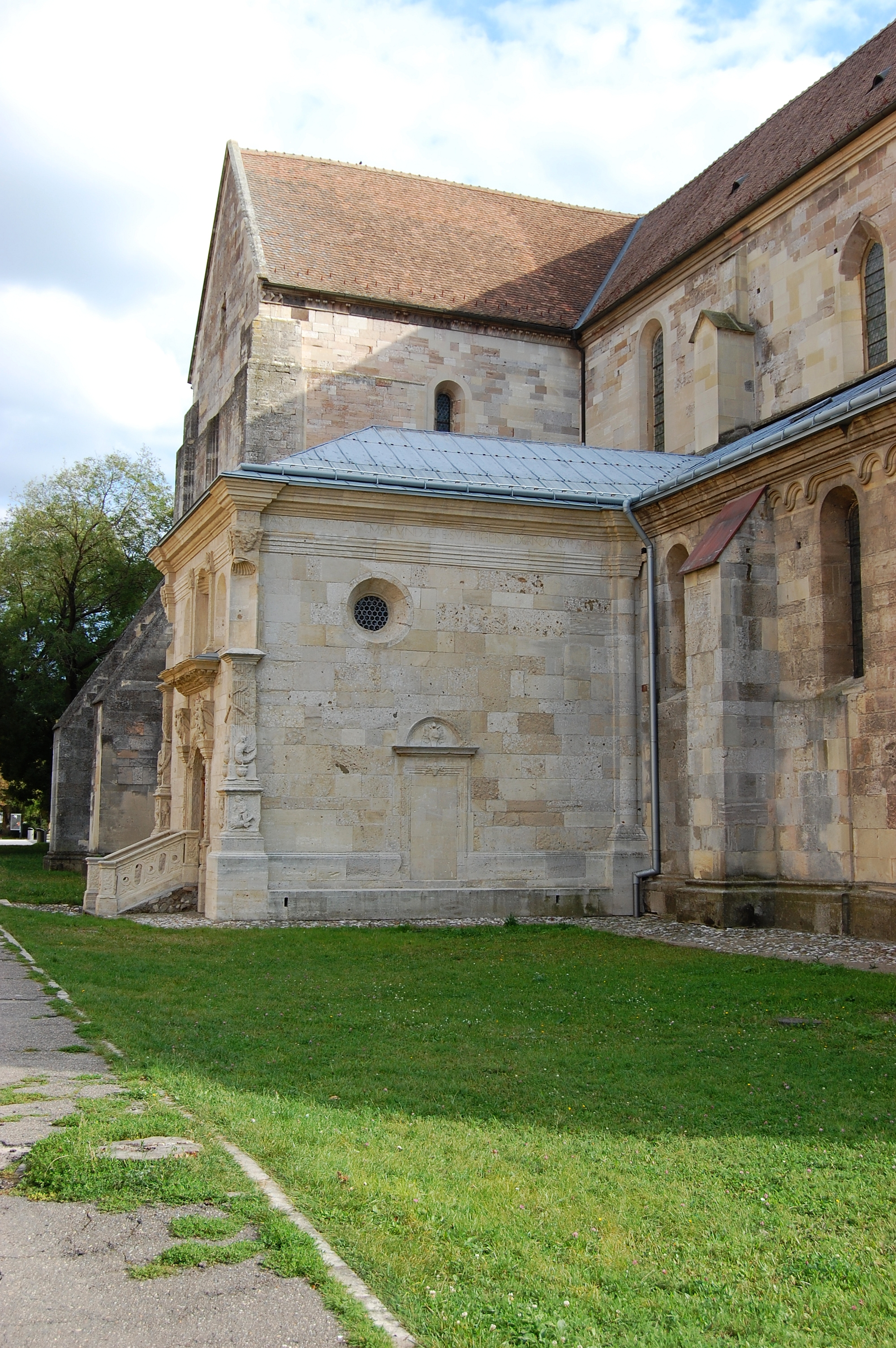
The Lazo chapel of the St. Michael's Cathedral in Alba Iulia, Romania (Hungarian: Gyulafehérvár)

Lászai returned to Hungary in the spring of 1484. He was granted nobility by King Matthias Corvinus in November 1489, who also donated a joint Renaissance-style coat-of-arms to him and his relatives, Anthony Sánkfalvi and some members of the Hős (Heős) family. Lászai became rector of the Holy Cross altar in the St. Michael's Cathedral in Gyulafehérvár by 1493. Lászai visited the Roman Curia in the spring of 1500 in order to grant permission from Pope Alexander VI to erect a chapel, who allowed it, but the subsequent death of Geréb (1502) hindered the implementation of his plans. He made another pilgrimage to the Holy Land sometime between 1500 and 1508, but the details of this trip have not survived. For now, he was the leader of the pilgrimage, and guided his two fellow Hungarian travelers, Francis of Pannonia, a canon of Pécs and Michael Pesti, a cleric at Vác.

In 1508, Lászai's stepfather John Barlabássy made his last will and testament, in which he bequeathed to his "dearest stepson" a significant amount in the form of a right to recover debts. Lászai established a chapel within the St. Michael's Cathedral around 1510; he transformed a Romanesque-style outbuilding, which had connected to the cathedral's northern side-aisle, into a chapel (called "Lászai's chapel" or "Lazo chapel"), which was consecrated in 1512. While its rib vault represents Gothic architecture, the building were decorated with Renaissance-style decorations and frescoes. The coats-of-arms of his benefactors and friends (i.e. Anthony Sánkfalvi, Ladislaus Geréb, Leonard Barlabássy and John Barlabássy) were depicted on the walls along with four epigrams written by Lászai himself. Within the chapel, Lászai also erected an altar dedicated to the Souls of the Faithful Departed. It was his initial intention that the chapel he founded be his final resting place.

However, János Lászai – just like the majority of the canons – had deteriorating relationship with the new Bishop of Transylvania Francis Várdai (1513–1524), who was an advocate of Humanist arts and sciences, but because of his incompatible personality, he had a conflict with many clergymen in the diocese. The last contemporary record in Hungary was issued on 27 September 1517, which attests Lászai's presence in Gyulafehérvár. Soon, he departed for Rome and became the Hungarian confessor of the St. Peter's Basilica. Lászai received accommodation in the Pauline monastery at Caelian Hill. In 1520, Lászai petitioned to Pope Leo X to allow him as a rector to appoint the priests of his chapel himself (excluding the bishop), and even filed a lawsuit against Várdai in income matters, forcing the bishop to explain at the Holy See. Várdai later built his own chapel within the cathedral; during the construction his architects mutilated and half-obscured the eastern facade of Lászai's chapel. János Lászai died of the plague in Rome on 17 August 1523. He was hastily buried in the Santo Stefano Rotondo on the next day, on 18 August 1523. The executor of his last will and testament was the Humanist writer Stephanus Brodericus. Lászai's grave still can be found today with the circumscription: "Io(hannes) Lazo archidi(aconus) Transil(vaniensis) panno(nius) penit(entiarius) ap(ostolicus) dum ann(um) ageret LXXV obiit XVII aug(usti) M.D.XXIII". (Note: In English: "János Lászai, Archdeacon of Transylvania, Hungarian Papal Confessor, lived for 75 years, died on August 17, 1523.") His own epitaph was also engraved on his tomb (see below). An exact copy of the tomb was inaugurated in St. Michael's Cathedral in December 1999.

"NATVM QVEM GELIDVM VIDES AD ISTRUM ROMANA TEGIETUR VIATOR VRNA NON MIRABERE SI EXTIMABIS ILLVD QVOD ROMA EST PATRIA OMNIUM FVITQVE"

— (Note: Rough translation: "Wanderer who walks here, do not be surprised // that he rests in a Roman tomb, //who was born at the icy Danube, // since Rome was and remains the homeland of all of us")

== Poems ==
Altogether eight epigrams of János Lászai have survived over the centuries in the following ways:

1. His three impromptu epigrams during his first pilgrimage to the Holy Land (1483–1484) were recorded by his travel companion Felix Fabri in his work "Fratris Felicis Fabri Evagatorium in Terræ Sanctæ, Arabiæ et Egypti peregrinationem".
2. Around 1511, Lászai wrote four epigrams, which were engraved on the walls of the Lazo chaptel within the St. Michael's Cathedral in Gyulafehérvár (present-day Alba Iulia, Romania), erected and consecrated by Lászai in 1512.
3. He wrote his own epitaph, which was engraved on his tomb at the basilica of Santo Stefano Rotondo.

According to his biographer Sándor V. Kovács, "in his day, proficiency in the craft of poetry was essential at some level of education. Lászai's poetic talent was not a striking novelty. The fact that we are considered one of our humanist poets can be explained by the fact that he was more talented than average, more poetry than craft in his occasional poems, and therefore he could claim a place, albeit modest, in the history of Hungarian Renaissance poetry, but does not significantly change our [Hungarian] previous perception of pre-Mohács poetry."

== Sources ==
- Balogh, Jolán (1943). Az erdélyi renaissance. Kolozsvár: Teleki Pál Tudományos Intézet. (2nd edition: Máriabesnyő, Attraktor, 2018.)
- Barabássy, Sándor (2012). Egy reneszánsz mecénás főúr a 15–16. századi Erdélyben. Barlabássy Lénárd erdélyi alvajda, székely alispán kora és tevékenysége a dokumentumok tükrében [A Renaissance Philanthropist Magnate at the 15–16th-Century Transylvania. The Age and Activity of Leonard Barlabássy, Vice-Voivode of Transylvania and Viscount of the Székelys in the Light of the Documents] (in Hungarian). Méry Ratio. ISBN 978-80-89286-81-2.
- Érszegi, Géza (2013). "A Paenitentiaria Apostolica dokumentumai „in partibus"" (PDF). In Homoki-Nagy, Mária (ed.). Ünnepi kötet Dr. Blazovich László egyetemi tanár 70. születésnapjára. Szeged: Szegedi Tudományegyetem. pp. 199–221.
- Érszegi, Géza (2000). "Romana urna tegier". In Piti, Ferenc (ed.). "Magyaroknak eleiről" : ünnepi tanulmányok a hatvan esztendős Makk Ferenc tiszteletére. Szeged: Szegedi Középkorász Műhely.
- Hadobás, Sándor (1998). "Lászai János. Egy, a városkörnyékről elszármazott humanista portréja" (PDF).
- Halmos, Balázs (2006). "A gyulafehérvári székesegyház Lázói-kápolnája: építészettörténeti monográfia" (PDF).
- Halmos, Balázs (n.d.). "Lombard hatások a gyulafehérvári Lázói-kápolna reneszánsz átépítésében".
- Lázár, Imre (2000). "Egy erdélyi zarándok Egyiptomban. Lászai János 1483-as útja a Szent Család nyomában" (PDF). Magyar Egyháztörténeti Vázlatok. Vol. 1–4. pp. 105–125.
- Sárközy, Péter (2001). "Roma est patria omnium fuitque": Lászai János erdélyi főesperes síremléke a római Santo Stefano Rotondo templomban. Budapest: Szent István Társulat.
- Tardy, Lajos (1983). Régi magyar követjárások keleten. Budapest: Akadémiai Kiadó.
- V. Kovács, Sándor (1987). "Egy epigrammaköltő a Jagelló-korban (Lászai János latin versei)". In V. Kovács, Sándor (ed.). Eszmetörténet és régi magyar irodalom. Budapest: Magvető.
- V. Kovács, Sándor (1971). "A humanista Lászai János". Filológiai Közlöny. 3–4: 344–366.
