= Hieronymus Rorarius =

Hieronymus Rorarius (Girolamo Rorario), (Pordenone 1485-Pordenone 1556) was at first an envoy on behalf of Charles V of Habsburg, and then a Papal nuncio to the court of Ferdinand of Hungary. In a 1544 pamphlet, Rorarius maintained that animals make better use of reason than men do. After Gabriel Naudé republished the book in 1648, it was reprinted several times, and discussed at length by Pierre Bayle's entry Rorarius in his Historical and Critical Dictionary, where it introduced a critical discussion of the nature of the soul and of Descartes's and Leibniz's philosophies.

== Works ==
- Quod animalia bruta ratione utantur melius homine, 1544.
