= Fortress Church, Târgu Mureș =

Church building in Târgu Mureș, Romania

Coordinates: 46°32′48″N 24°33′59″E

Fortress Church
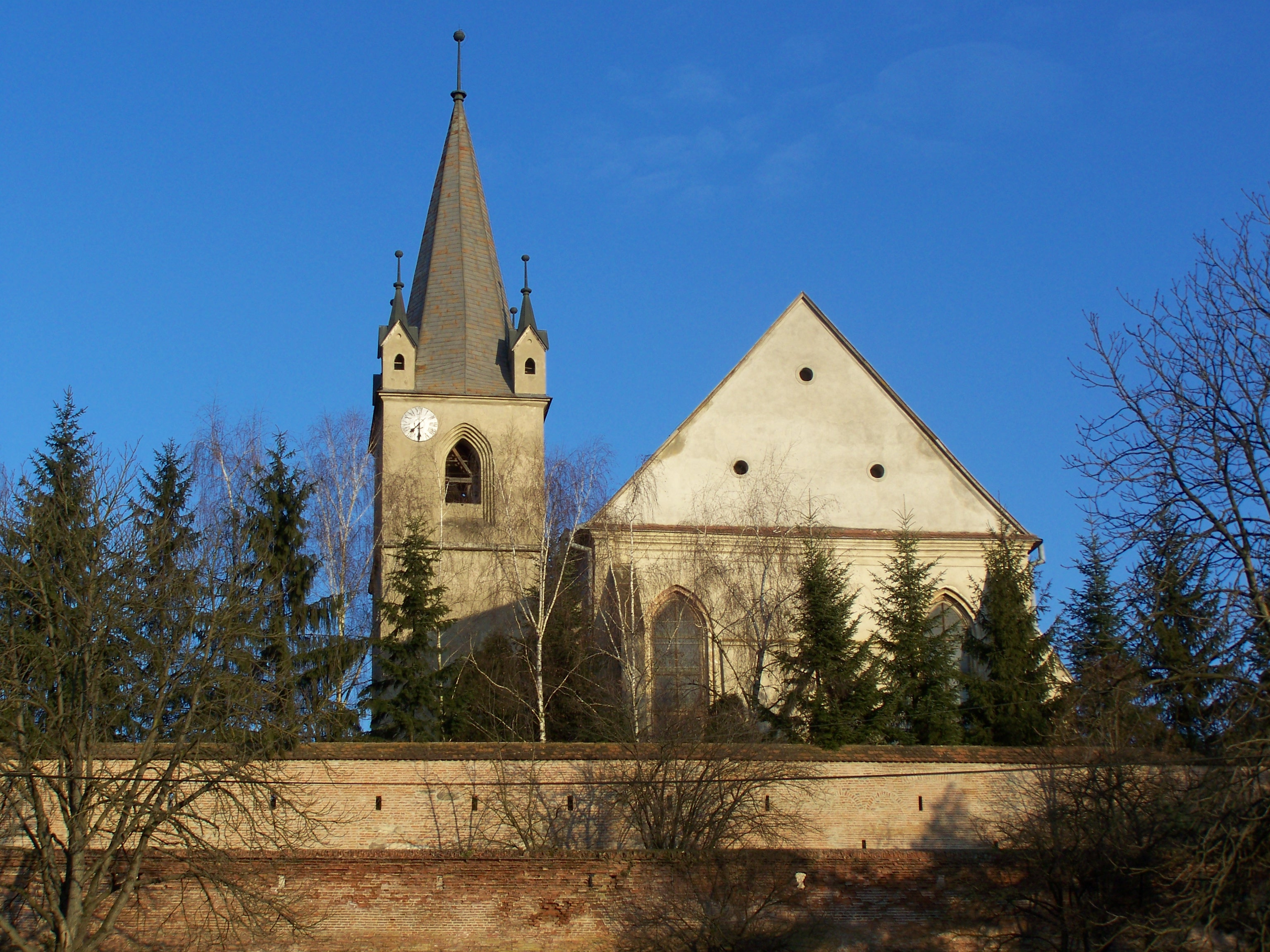

Religion
- Affiliation: Reformed
- Ecclesiastical or organizational status: Church

Location
- Location: Târgu Mureș, Romania
- Interactive map of Fortress Church

The Fortress Church or the Big Church (in Hungarian Vártemplom) is the oldest surviving church in Târgu Mureș.

== History ==
After less than a century from the first historical proof of the existence of the Franciscan order in Transylvania, Hungarian Kingdom Franciscan friars arrived in the town. The monastery is first mentioned in 1332. Its building took an entire century, from the middle of the 14th century until the middle of the 15th and includes the monastery building, an older chapel, the church and the steeple. As far as the architectural style is concerned, these buildings belong to the late Gothic, both structurally and aesthetically. There were three building periods: 1350–1370 – when the chapel and monastery were built, 1370–1400 – the erection of the church choir and 1400–1450 – the last period during which the church and steeple were finalized. In 2010, the seal of a franciscan friar that was travelling to it so as to review it was discovered. The franciscan order sent friars from other monasteries to review the activity of other ones, either yearly, or every other two years. They were usually sent from as far a place as possible so as to ensure the unbiasedness of the report that they wrote.

== Description ==
The current appearance of the inside of the church is the result of numerous changes done in time. Close to the entrance there is a balcony supported by arches on posts. The slightly curved ceiling, reinforced by four pairs of double arches and decorated with stucco, is the result of remodeling works performed in 1790 by Anton Türk, one of the most famous Transylvanian architects of the Baroque period. The church may have been originally decorated with frescos, as traces of mural paintings were found inside. The almost complete disappearance of these paintings is due to the fact that the church became the property of reformed believers in 1557. The religious reform required for churches to have no paintings, statues or religious frescos.

The last one to be built was the 50 meter high, 4 level steeple-tower. The top level, where the bells are, has broken arch openings on all four sides. The pointed roof of the tower has four smaller towers in each corner. The tower may have replaced part of the monastery building, which was demolished to make place for it.
