= Suatu =

Suatu Magyarszovát
- Commune
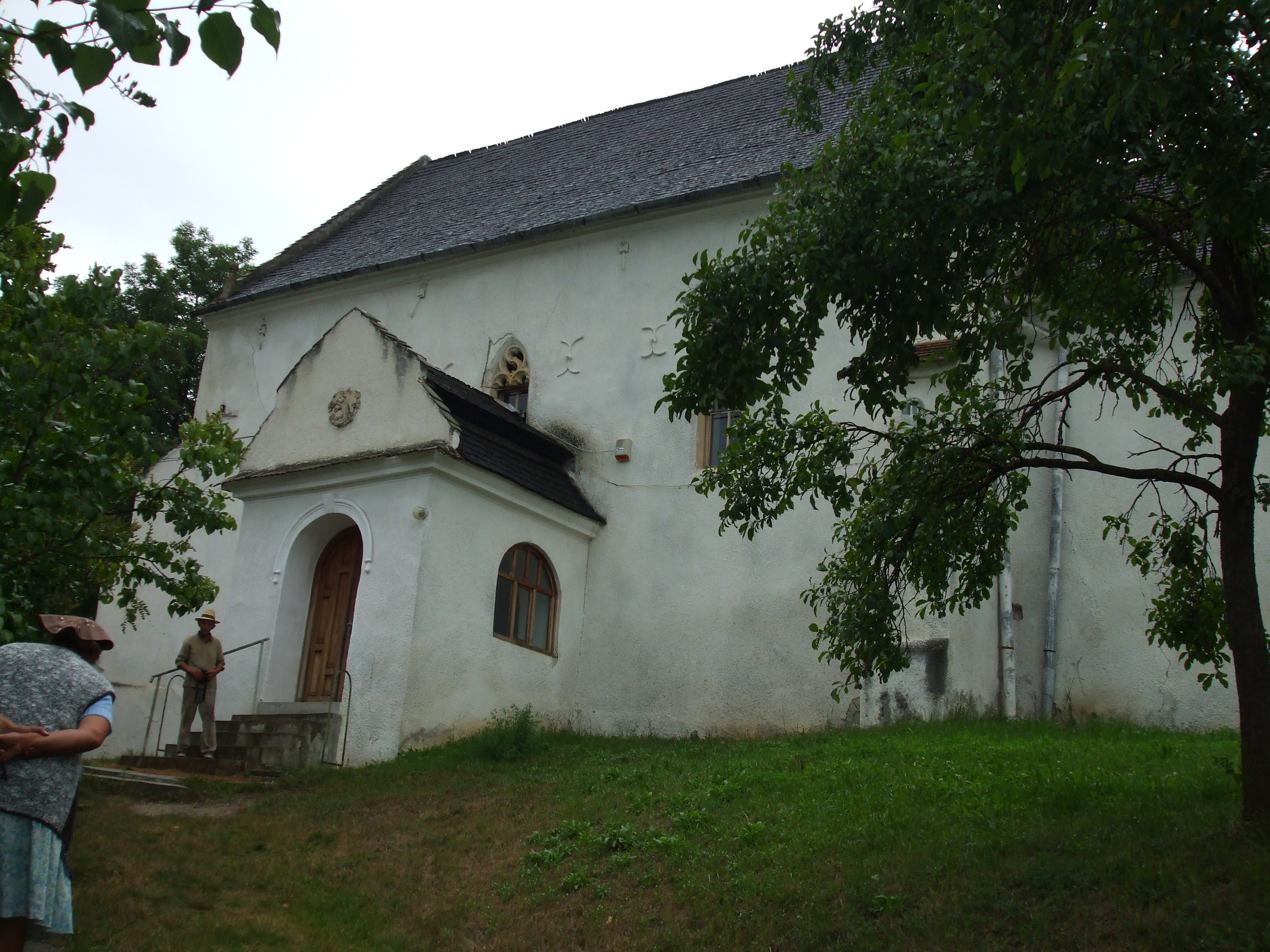
- Unitarian church in Suatu (13th century)

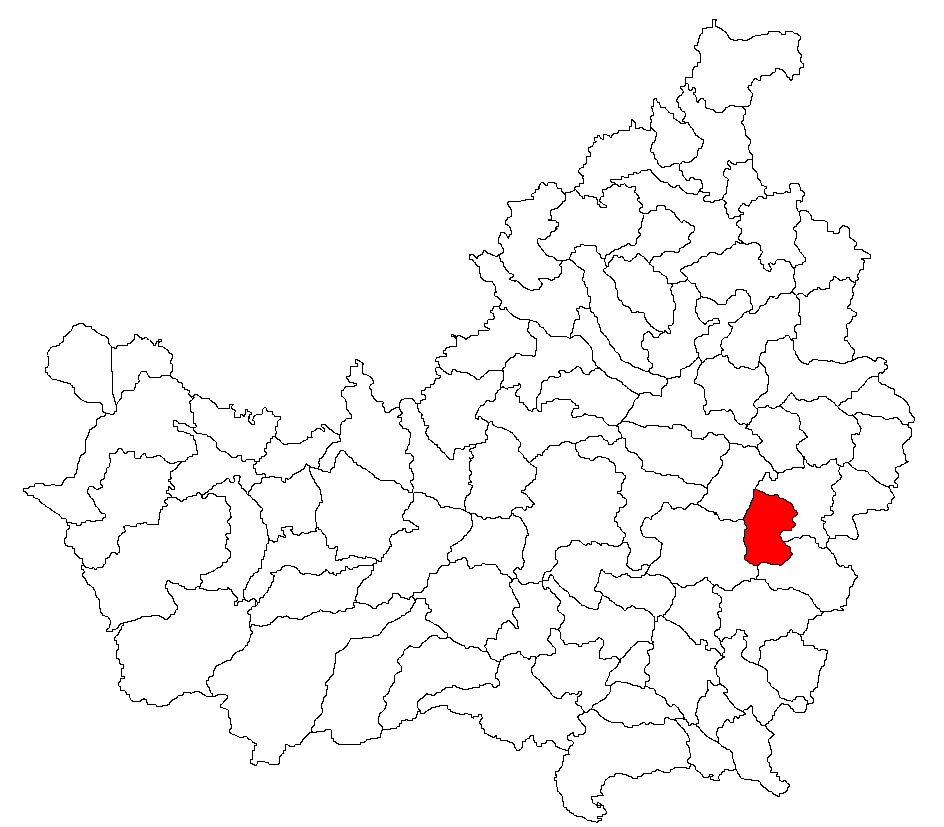
- Location in Cluj County

- Location in Romania
- Coordinates: 46°46′45.12″N 23°57′51.12″E
- Country: Romania
- County: Cluj
- Subdivisions: Aruncuta, Dâmburile, Suatu

Government
  - Mayor (2020–2024): Mihai Szobo (UDMR)
- Area: 52.84 km^{2} (20.40 sq mi)
- Elevation: 373 m (1,224 ft)
- Population (2021-12-01): 1,552
  - Density: 29.37/km^{2} (76.07/sq mi)
- Time zone: UTC+02:00 (EET)
  - Summer (DST): UTC+03:00 (EEST)
- Postal code: 407545
- Area code: (+40) 0264
- Vehicle reg.: CJ
- Website: www.comunasuatu.ro

Suatu (Hungarian: Magyarszovát) is a commune in Cluj County, Transylvania, Romania. It is composed of three villages: Aruncuta (Aranykút), Dâmburile (Dombokfalva), and Suatu.

The commune is located in the eastern part of the county, at a distance of 34 km (21 mi) from the county seat, Cluj-Napoca.

At the 2011 census, the commune had a population of 1,737; of those, 48.2% were ethnic Hungarians, 39.6% ethnic Romanians, and 9.4% ethnic Roma. At the 2021 census, Suatu had a population of 1,552, of which 41.04% were Hungarians, 37.31% Romanians, and 14.11% Roma.
