= Castra of Războieni-Cetate =

Fort in the Roman province of Dacia

- Location within Romania
- 46.417222°N 23.868333°E
- Location: Cetate, Războieni-Cetate, Alba, Romania

History
- Founded: 2nd century AD
- Built: Trajan?
- Abandoned: 3rd century AD

Site notes
- Elevation: 243 m (797 ft)
- Excavation dates: 1960; 1995 - 2000
- Condition: Ruined

The castra of Războieni-Cetate was a fort in the Roman province of Dacia.

== See also ==
- List of castra
