= Bobâlna =

- Commune
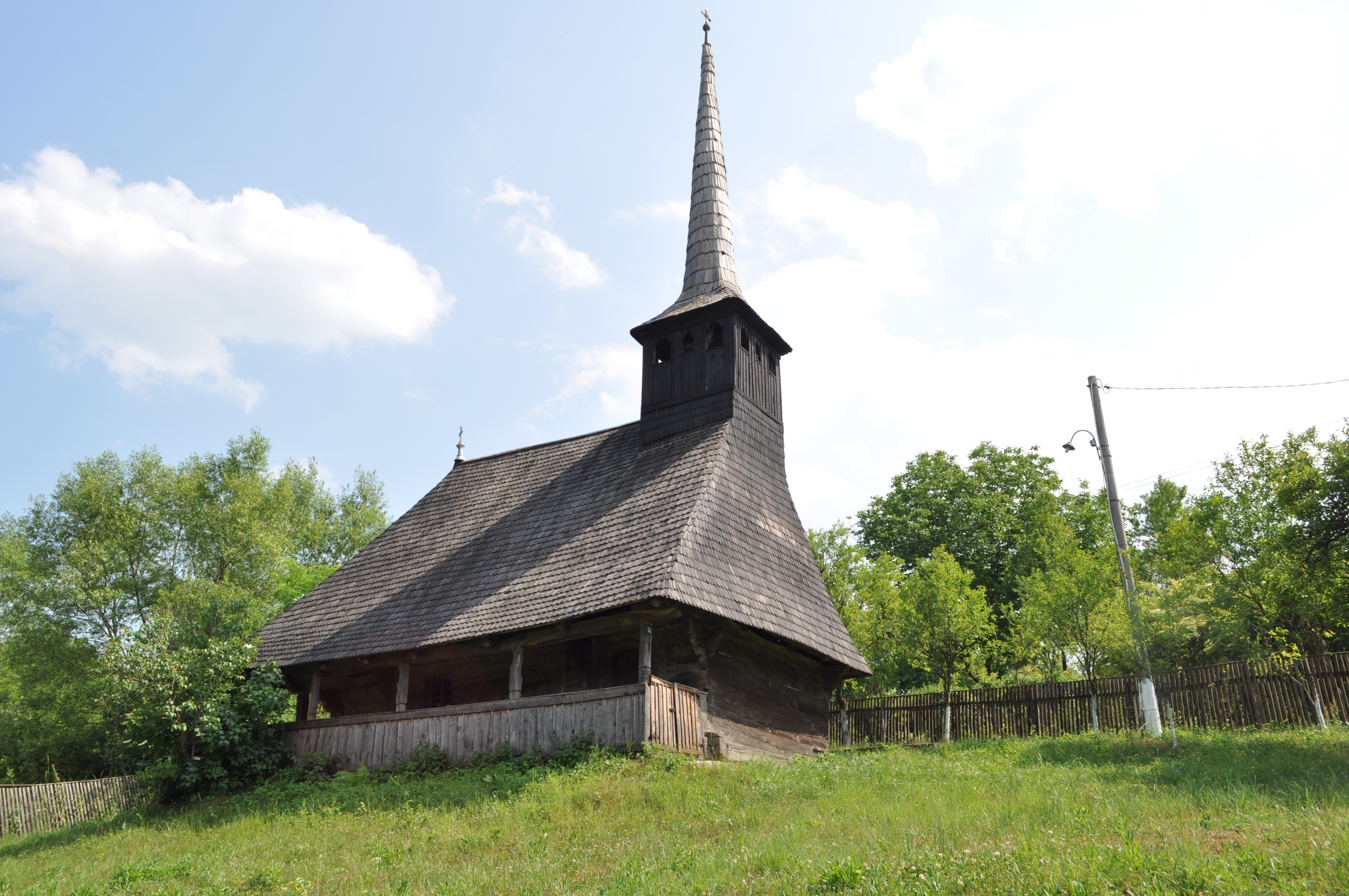
- Wooden church in Cremenea

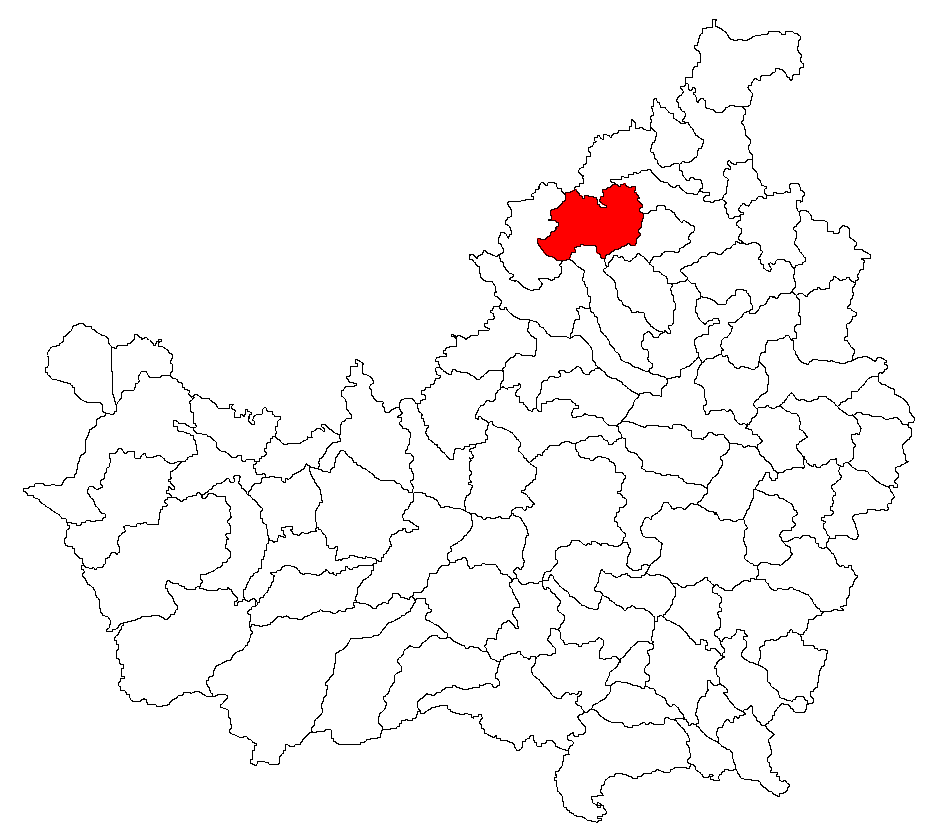
- Location in Cluj County

- Location in Romania
- Coordinates: 47°9′N 23°39′E
- Country: Romania
- County: Cluj
- Established: 1332
- Subdivisions: Antăș, Băbdiu, Blidărești, Bobâlna, Cremenea, Maia, Oșorhel, Pruni, Răzbuneni, Suarăș, Vâlcelele

Government
  - Mayor (2020–2024): Augustin Mureșan (PSD)
- Area: 74.6 km^{2} (28.8 sq mi)
- Elevation: 204 m (669 ft)
- Population (2021-12-01): 1,382
  - Density: 18.5/km^{2} (48.0/sq mi)
- Time zone: UTC+02:00 (EET)
  - Summer (DST): UTC+03:00 (EEST)
- Postal code: 407085
- Area code: (+40) 0264
- Vehicle reg.: CJ
- Website: primariabobilna.ro

Bobâlna (Olpret until 1957; Hungarian: Alparét; German: Krautfeld) is a commune in Cluj County, Transylvania, Romania. It is composed of eleven villages: Antăș (Antos), Băbdiu (Zápróc), Blidărești (Tálosfalva), Bobâlna, Cremenea (Keménye), Maia (Mánya), Oșorhel (Erdővásárhely), Pruni (Nagymező), Răzbuneni (Radákszinye), Suarăș (Szóváros), and Vâlcelele (Bujdos).

The first document that mentions the village is from 1332. This village was the place where the 15th century Bobâlna revolt started.

== Demographics ==
According to the census from 2002, there were 1,888 people living in this commune; of this population, 96.78% were ethnic Romanians, 1.85% ethnic Roma, and 1.37% ethnic Hungarians. At the 2021 census, Bobâlna had a population of 1,382; of those, 87.34% were Romanians and 6.37% Roma.

== Natives ==
- Ferenc Barlabássy (c. 1540–1599), Hungarian nobleman
- Alexandru Vaida-Voevod (1872–1950), politician, served as Prime Minister of Romania
