= János Sylvester =

Hungarian Protestant reformer (1504–1552)

Sylvester letters

János Sylvester sometimes known as János Erdősi (1504–1552) was a 16th-century Hungarian figure of the Reformation, and also a poet and grammarian, who was the first to translate the New Testament into Hungarian, in 1541.

== Life ==
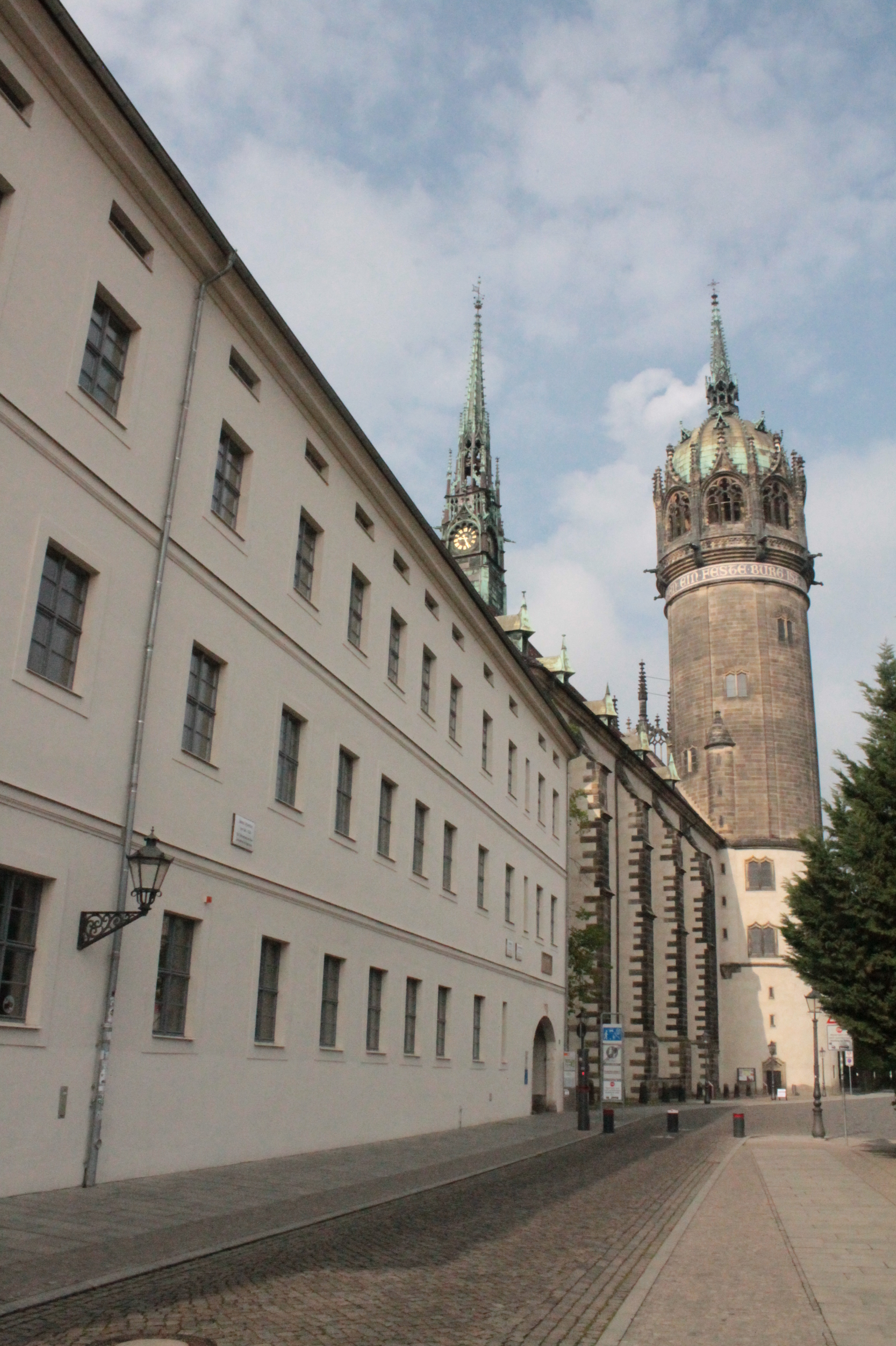
Schlossplatz Wittenberg

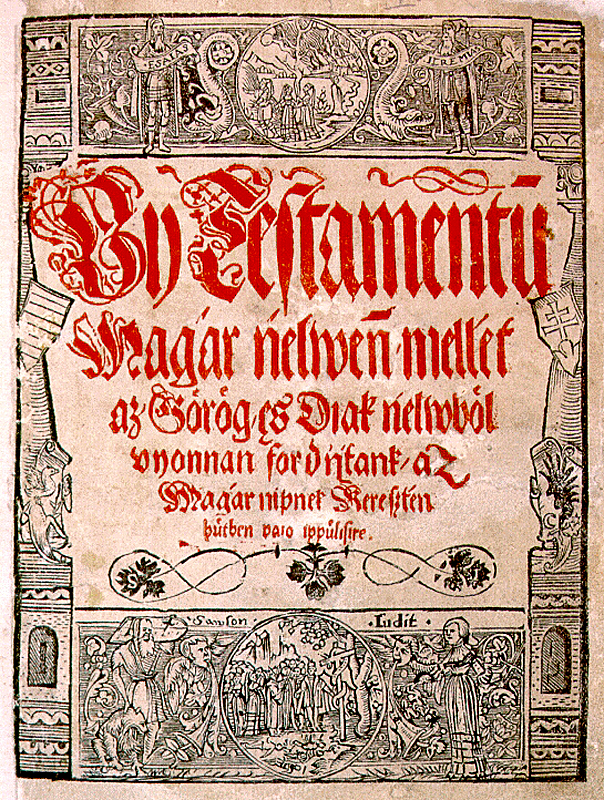
Sylvester's Bible

He was born into a middle-class family at Szinérváralja in Hungary.

He was a disciple of Erasmus, studying at the University of Krakow in 1526/27.

He went to study at the university of Wittenberg in central Germany in 1529 and returned in 1534 to 1536, studying theology under Martin Luther and Philip Melanchthon. In Wittenberg he lived in accommodation on Schlossplatz east of the Schlosskirche.

On return to Hungary he set up one of the first printing presses in Újsziget.

In 1543 he moved to the University of Vienna to teach Latin and Greek.

He died on 6 May 1552.

== Publications ==
- Rosarium (1527) the first poem in Hungarian
- Grammatica Hungarolatina (1539) the first document to establish "standardised spelling" in Hungarian
- The New Testament (first Hungarian translation) (1541)

He is also credited with creating the idea of an "essay".
