= Ocna Mureș =

- Town
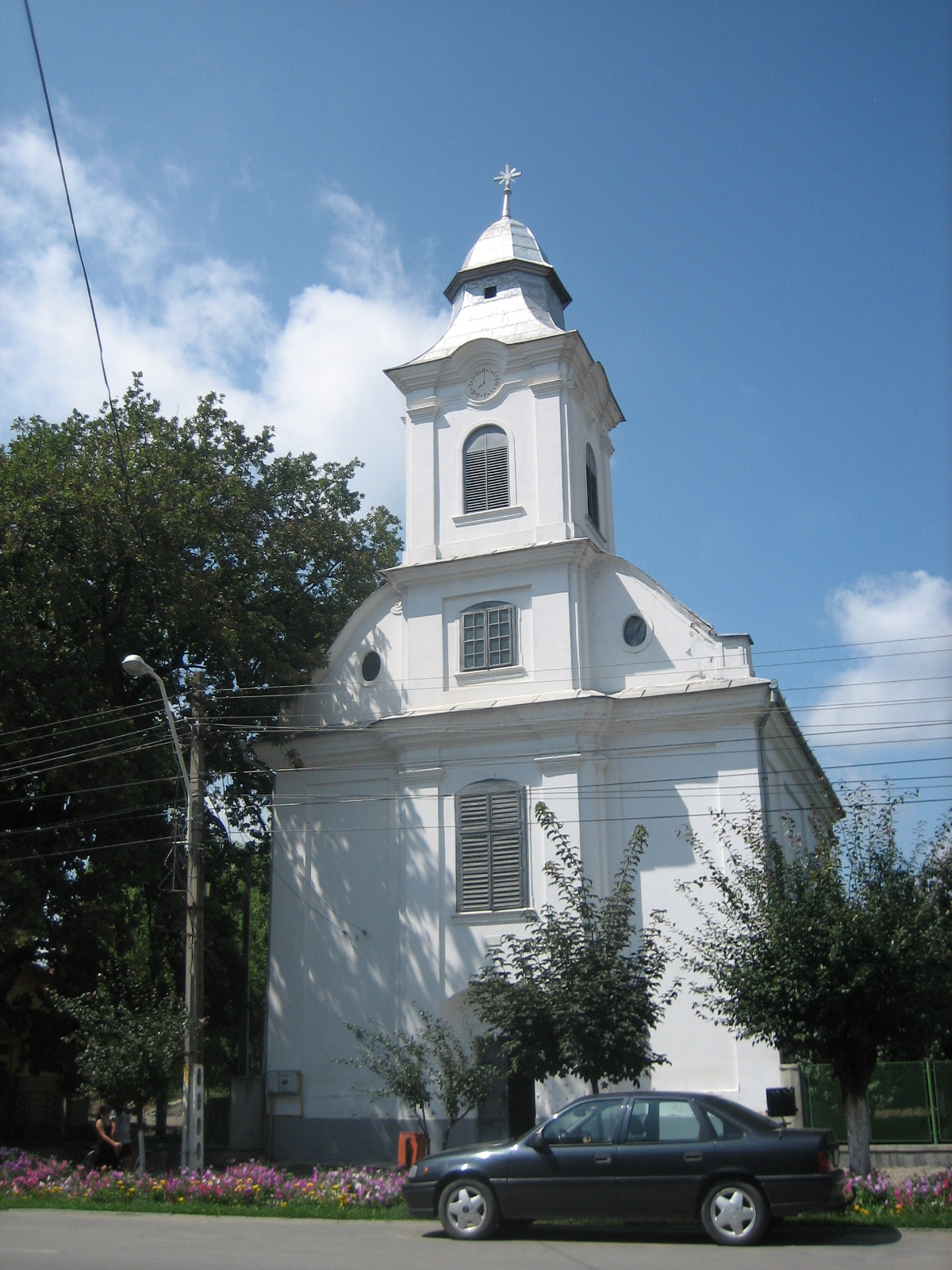

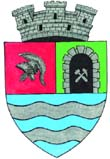
- Coat of arms

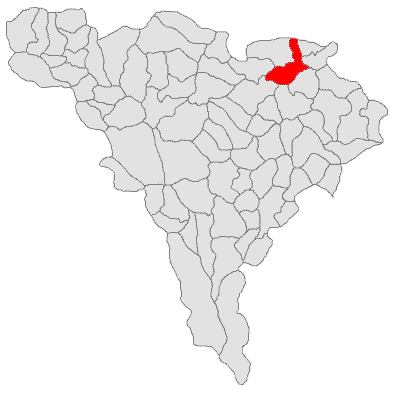
- Location in Alba County

- Location in Romania
- Coordinates: 46°23′24″N 23°51′36″E
- Country: Romania
- County: Alba

Government
  - Mayor (2024–2028): Silviu Vințeler (PNL)
- Area: 68.34 km^{2} (26.39 sq mi)
- Elevation: 208 m (682 ft)
- Population (2021-12-01): 12,480
  - Density: 182.6/km^{2} (473.0/sq mi)
- Time zone: UTC+02:00 (EET)
  - Summer (DST): UTC+03:00 (EEST)
- Postal code: 515700
- Area code: (+40) 02 58
- Vehicle reg.: AB
- Website: www.primariaocnamures.ro

Ocna Mureș (Romanian pronunciation: [ˌokna ˈmureʃ]; Latin: Salinae, Hungarian: Marosújvár, German: Miereschhall) is a town in Alba County, Romania, located in the north-eastern corner of the county, near the Mureș River.

The town administers five villages: Cisteiu de Mureș (Magyarcsesztve), Micoșlaca (Miklóslaka), Războieni-Cetate (Székelyföldvár), Uioara de Jos (until 1960 Ciunga; Csongva), and Uioara de Sus (Felsőmarosújvár). Its former name is Uioara, and was called Ocna Mureșului from 1925 to 1956.

== History ==
The town is situated next to a large deposit of salt, mined in the past until the ceiling of the mines collapsed from water infiltration in 1978. Ocna Mureș has a chlorosodic products plant, a salt extraction plant, and a spa which uses the salty water from the former mines. The spa is again open to the public, due to new investments made by the city and county in a new building with spa, salty basins, medical treatments, and sports facilities.

The chemical plant in town was lastly purchased by an Indian company from a company based in Timișoara. Currently, the plant has ceased activity and the old buildings were demolished to make room for new enterprises.The majority of high school students attend either Liceul Teoretic Petru Maior or the 'Industrial Highschool,' where many are trained to later work in mechanics, electrical and IT. Exceptional students progress onto university studies, generally in nearby Cluj-Napoca or Alba Iulia, the county capital. The town’s salt mine was flooded in 1978 and the ground became unstable and collapsed. Now this area is filled with more than 4 large, salty and very deep ponds which are projected to become an big natural park. The center of the town and city hall are located at the base of a large hill, the 'Banța.'

== Demographics ==
Historical population
Year	Pop.	±%
1956	10,701	—
1966	12,126	+13.3%
1977	16,416	+35.4%
1992	16,256	−1.0%
2002	15,697	−3.4%
2011	13,036	−17.0%
2021	12,480	−4.3%
Source: Census data

According to the census from 2011, the town had a total population of 13,036; of those, 83.46% were ethnic Romanians, 9.31% ethnic Hungarians, and 7% ethnic Romani. At the 2021 census, Ocna Mureș had a population of 12,480, of which 80.03% were Romanians, 6.38% Romani, and 6.19% Hungarians.

== Natives ==
- Tiberiu Bălan (born 1981), footballer
- János Barlabássy (1482–1560), Hungarian prelate
- Leonard Barlabássy (c.1455–1525), Hungarian nobleman, Vice-voivode of Transylvania from 1501 to 1525
- Rareș Bogdan (born 1974), politician, member of the European Parliament
- Mihaela Botezan (born 1976), long-distance runner
- Gheorghe Cacoveanu (1935–2001), footballer
- Gabriella Csire (born 1938), writer
- Adrian Gongolea (born 1975), footballer
- Ovidiu Maier (born 1971), footballer
- Bazil Marian (1922–2008), football player and coach
- Alexandru Moldovan (born 1950), football player and manager
- Ioachim Moldoveanu (1913–1981), footballer
- Mircea Stanciu (born 1975), footballer

== Climate ==
Ocna Mureș has a humid continental climate (Cfb in the Köppen climate classification).

Climate data for Ocna Mureș
Month	Jan	Feb	Mar	Apr	May	Jun	Jul	Aug	Sep	Oct	Nov	Dec	Year
Mean daily maximum °C (°F)	1.8 (35.2)	4.8 (40.6)	10.4 (50.7)	16.4 (61.5)	21 (70)	24.3 (75.7)	26.2 (79.2)	26.4 (79.5)	21.3 (70.3)	15.5 (59.9)	9.4 (48.9)	3.2 (37.8)	15.1 (59.1)
Daily mean °C (°F)	−2 (28)	0.2 (32.4)	5 (41)	10.9 (51.6)	15.9 (60.6)	19.5 (67.1)	21.3 (70.3)	21.3 (70.3)	16.3 (61.3)	10.5 (50.9)	5 (41)	−0.4 (31.3)	10.3 (50.5)
Mean daily minimum °C (°F)	−5.4 (22.3)	−3.7 (25.3)	−0.2 (31.6)	5.2 (41.4)	10.3 (50.5)	14 (57)	15.9 (60.6)	16.2 (61.2)	11.6 (52.9)	6.1 (43.0)	1.5 (34.7)	−3.3 (26.1)	5.7 (42.2)
Average precipitation mm (inches)	35 (1.4)	33 (1.3)	47 (1.9)	70 (2.8)	94 (3.7)	112 (4.4)	108 (4.3)	94 (3.7)	73 (2.9)	55 (2.2)	41 (1.6)	43 (1.7)	805 (31.9)
Source: https://en.climate-data.org/europe/romania/alba/ocna-mures-15288/

== See also ==
- Castra of Războieni-Cetate
