= Marosszék =

- Seat of Székely Land
- 12th century–1876
- Coat of arms
- Capital: Marosvásárhely
- Population
  - 1867: 91,008
- History
  - Settlement of the Székelys: 12th century
  - Administrative reform of the Kingdom of Hungary: 1876
- Today part of: Romania
- Târgu Mureș is the current name of the capital.

Marosszék (Hungarian pronunciation: [ˈmɒroʃseːk]) was one of the seats in the historical Székely Land area. Historically it was part of the Kingdom of Hungary. After World War I it became part of Romania. It was named after the Maros, a river with the biggest discharge in the seat.

The composer Zoltán Kodály wrote the Dances of Marosszék, a 1927 piece for piano which was later orchestrated, based on the folk music of the region.

== Population ==
In 1867 the total population of Marosszék was 91,008. The population has historically been made up mainly of Székelys, an ethnic subgroup of Hungarians.

The religious make-up of the area in 1867 was:

- Calvinist: 48,034
- Roman Catholic: 15,697
- Greek Catholic: 12,641
- Unitarian: 7,116
- Greek Orthodox: 5,520
- Jewish: 944
- Lutheran: 285
- Foreigner: 771

== Gallery ==
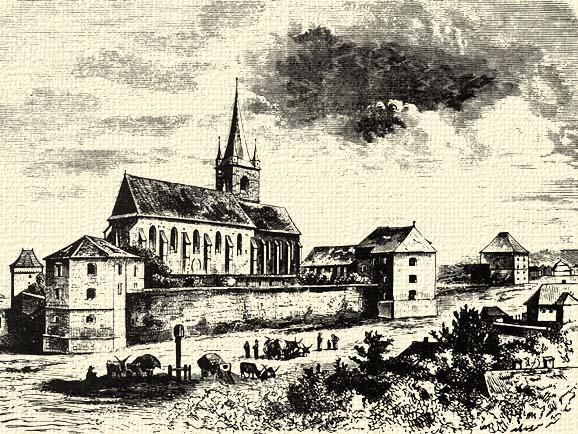
The fortified church of Marosvásárhely

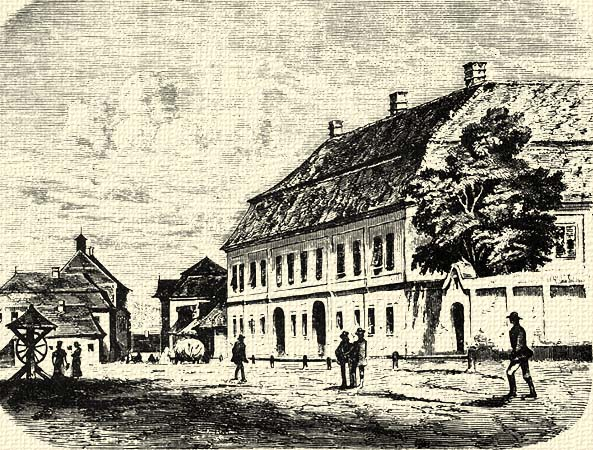
Teleki Library, commonly known as the Teleki Téka, established in 1802

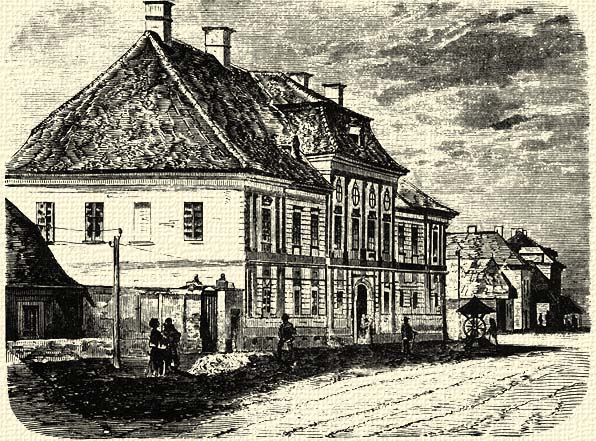
Building of the Royal Court of Appeal in Marosvásárhely

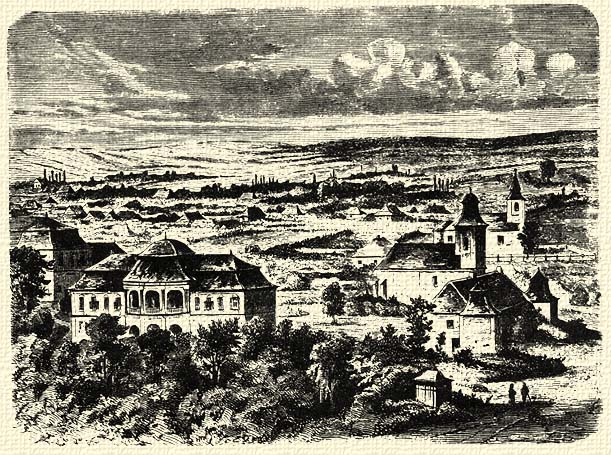
Castle of the Rhédey noble family in Mezősámsond

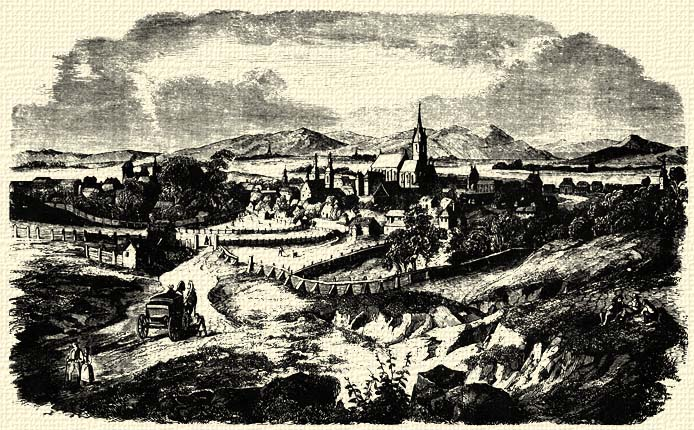
View of Marosvásárhely and surroundings
