= Banderium =

Medieval Hungarian military unit

The banderium was a military unit which was distinguished by the banner of a high-ranking clergyman or nobleman in the medieval Kingdom of Hungary. Its name derived from the Latin or Italian words for banner (banerium and bandiera, respectively).

== Sources ==
- Rady, Martyn (2000). Nobility, Land and Service in Medieval Hungary. Palgrave. ISBN 0-333-80085-0.
- Sebők, Ferenc (2010). "Banderium". In Rogers, Clifford J. (ed.). The Oxford Encyclopedia of Medieval Warfare and Military Technology, Volume 1. Oxford University Press. p. 118. ISBN 978-0-19-533403-6.

== See also ==
- Engel, Pál (2001). The Realm of St Stephen: A History of Medieval Hungary, 895–1526. I.B. Tauris Publishers. ISBN 1-86064-061-3.
