= St. Michael's Cathedral, Alba Iulia =

Church and episcopal seat in Alba Iulia, Romania

St. Michael's Cathedral
- Gyulafehérvári érseki székesegyház

- Location in Romania
- 46°04′03″N 23°34′12″E
- Location: Alba Iulia, Alba County, Romania
- Country: Romania
- Denomination: Roman Catholicism

History
- Status: Active
- Founded: 13th century
- Founder: Stephen I of Hungary

Architecture
- Functional status: Cathedral
- Heritage designation: Romanian Historic Monument (Code: AB-II-m-A-00129)
- Architectural type: Cathedral
- Style: Romanesque and Gothic
- Groundbreaking: 11th century
- Completed: 13th century

Specifications
- Length: 83 m
- Width: 38 m

Administration
- Archdiocese: Roman Catholic Archdiocese of Alba Iulia

Clergy
- Archbishop: Gergely Kovács

St. Michael's Cathedral (Romanian: Catedra Sfântul Mihail, Hungarian: Gyulafehérvári érseki székesegyház) is the cathedral church of the Archdiocese of Alba Iulia (formerly the Diocese of Transylvania, founded by King Saint Stephen). Elevated to an archdiocese in 1991, the building is one of the most important architectural monuments in Romania.

Since 1991, the cathedral has been included on Romania's tentative list for UNESCO World Heritage site status as part of the historic center of Alba Iulia. It is also officially registered in the Romanian National Register of Historic Monuments under the code AB-II-m-A-00129.

== History and Evolution ==
=== Early Foundations and Archaeological Layers ===
Christianity in the region dates back to missionary work carried out around 952–953 by the Greek bishop Hierotheos, following an invitation by Gyula Zombor. After King Saint Stephen of Hungary defeated his maternal uncle, Gyula, in 1003, the Transylvanian church organization was established and finalized around 1009 during a papal legate's visit.

Extensive archaeological excavations have revealed multiple layers of earlier ecclesiastical structures beneath the current floor:

- The Earliest Structures: Located 32 meters from the current facade, archaeologists discovered a single-aisled, 20-meter-long church with a single semicircular apse that cut across 9th-century Bulgarian ruins and a 10th-century Hungarian horse burial. A separate circular church (rotunda) and a mid-10th to early 11th-century Greek-cross Byzantine style church were also uncovered.
- The First Cathedral: Built around the late 11th century (under Kings Saint Ladislaus of Hungary and Coloman of Hungary), this three-aisled basilica featured the famous Maiestas Domini tympanum (dating to around 1090) and was surrounded by a 12th-century cemetery.

=== The Second Cathedral and Reconstruction (1247–1291) ===
The second cathedral was designed using Burgundian and Central French Romanesque models. Notably, historical analysis suggests that the renowned French architect Villard de Honnecourt may have contributed to its design. Reconstructed and built largely between 1247 and 1291, it became contemporary to the famous Notre Dame of Paris.

- The Mongol Invasion (1241): The original structure suffered catastrophic damage during the Mongol invasion when refugees sheltering inside were trapped and the building was set on fire, causing the vaults and central crossing tower to collapse.
- Hunyadi Patronage: The cathedral suffered further damage from Saxon uprisings (1277) and Ottoman incursions (1439). John Hunyadi, Governor of Hungary, financed a major Gothic-style extension of the sanctuary, built the ornate western main portal and balcony, and requested to be buried within the cathedral.
- Later Turmoil: The cathedral was plundered and damaged during subsequent political conflicts, including the campaigns of Wallachian prince Michael the Brave (1601), imperial forces under Giorgio Basta (1603), and a 1658 Ottoman punitive expedition that destroyed the ornate tombs of Princes George I Rákóczi and Gabriel Bethlen.

== Architecture and Exterior Features ==
Measuring 83 to 89 meters in length, 38 meters in width, and 19 meters in height, the cathedral is a monumental synthesis of styles. While it features Gothic, Renaissance, and Baroque architectural elements added over centuries, it is fundamentally celebrated as a masterpiece of the late Romanesque current.

- The Western Vault and Entrance: Erected between 1718 and 1738, the western entrance features a vaulted structure complete with a gable surrounded by four statues of saints and three intricate bas-reliefs.
- The Sanctuary Exterior: The lateral walls of the main sanctuary display two Romanesque bas-reliefs depicting Saint Michael the Archangel.

== Chapels and Renaissance Art ==
The Lászay Chapel: Located in the northern part of the cathedral, this chapel was built in 1512 by archpriest János Lászay to host the altar of Christian Souls. It is considered the oldest example of Renaissance architecture in Transylvania. It is richly decorated with bas-reliefs illustrating coats of arms, classic mythology, biblical figures, and Hungarian monarchs. Above the door leading to the northern aisle is a sculpture of Bishop Lászay kneeling before the Virgin and Child.

The Várday Chapel (St. Anne Chapel): Built between 1512 and 1514 by Bishop Ferenc Várday between the Lászay Chapel and the northern transept. The transept apse also preserves 16th-century fresco fragments depicting the Apostles Saint Andrew and Saint James.

== Interior, Art, and the 1877 Organ ==
- The Organ: Inside, the church proudly displays a magnificent 1877 pipe organ built by István Kolonics from Târgu Secuiesc, featuring 2,209 pipes (Opus 134).
- Sanctuary and Furnishings: The main altar and pulpit date back to the 16th century. The lower part of the sanctuary features Baroque canons' stalls whose wooden backs are painted with scenes from the lives of the prophets and the history of Salvation, alongside a Baroque sacristy portal and a finely carved tabernacle niche.

== Burials ==
The following notable individuals were interred in St. Michael's Cathedral:

- John Hunyadi († 1456) – Regent-Governor of Hungary
- Ladislaus Hunyadi († 1457) – Hungarian nobleman
- George Martinuzzi († 1551) – Cardinal and statesman
- Antal Kendi († 1549) – Vice-Voivode of Transylvania and Hungarian nobleman
- Ferenc Kendi († 1558) – Voivode of Transylvania and Count of the Székely, son of Vice-Voivode Antal Kendi. One of the wealthiest and most powerful Hungarian magnates of his era.
- Isabella Jagiellon († 1559) – Queen consort of Hungary
- John Sigismund Zápolya († 1571) – King of Hungary and Prince of Transylvania
- Andrew Báthory († 1599) – Prince of Transylvania
- George I Rákóczi († 1648) – Prince of Transylvania
- Gabriel Bethlen († 1629) – Prince of Transylvania (his ornate tomb was destroyed during the 1658 Ottoman invasion, though he was interred within the cathedral)
- Henrietta Marie of the Palatinate († 1651) – Palatinate noblewoman
- Áron Márton († 1980) – Roman Catholic Bishop
- Ignác Batthyány († 1798) – Roman Catholic Bishop of Transylvania and founder of the historic Batthyány Library
- Antal Jakab († 1993) – Roman Catholic Bishop of Alba Iulia
- Giovanni Morando Visconti († 1717) – Renowned Italian military engineer and architect who designed the Alba Carolina Citadel

=== Transylvanian Bishops ===
- György Mártonffy († 1721) – Bishop of Transylvania
- János Antalfi († 1728) – Bishop of Transylvania
- Gergely Sorger († 1739) – Bishop of Transylvania
- Antal Bajtay († 1775) – Bishop of Transylvania
- Piusz Manzador († 1796) – Bishop of Transylvania
- József Mártonffy († 1813) – Bishop of Transylvania
- Miklós Kovács († 1852) – Bishop of Transylvania
- Adolf Vorbuchner († 1938) – Bishop of Transylvania
- Győző Maczalik († 1953) – Titular bishop, persecuted under the communist regime, and martyr.

== Gallery ==
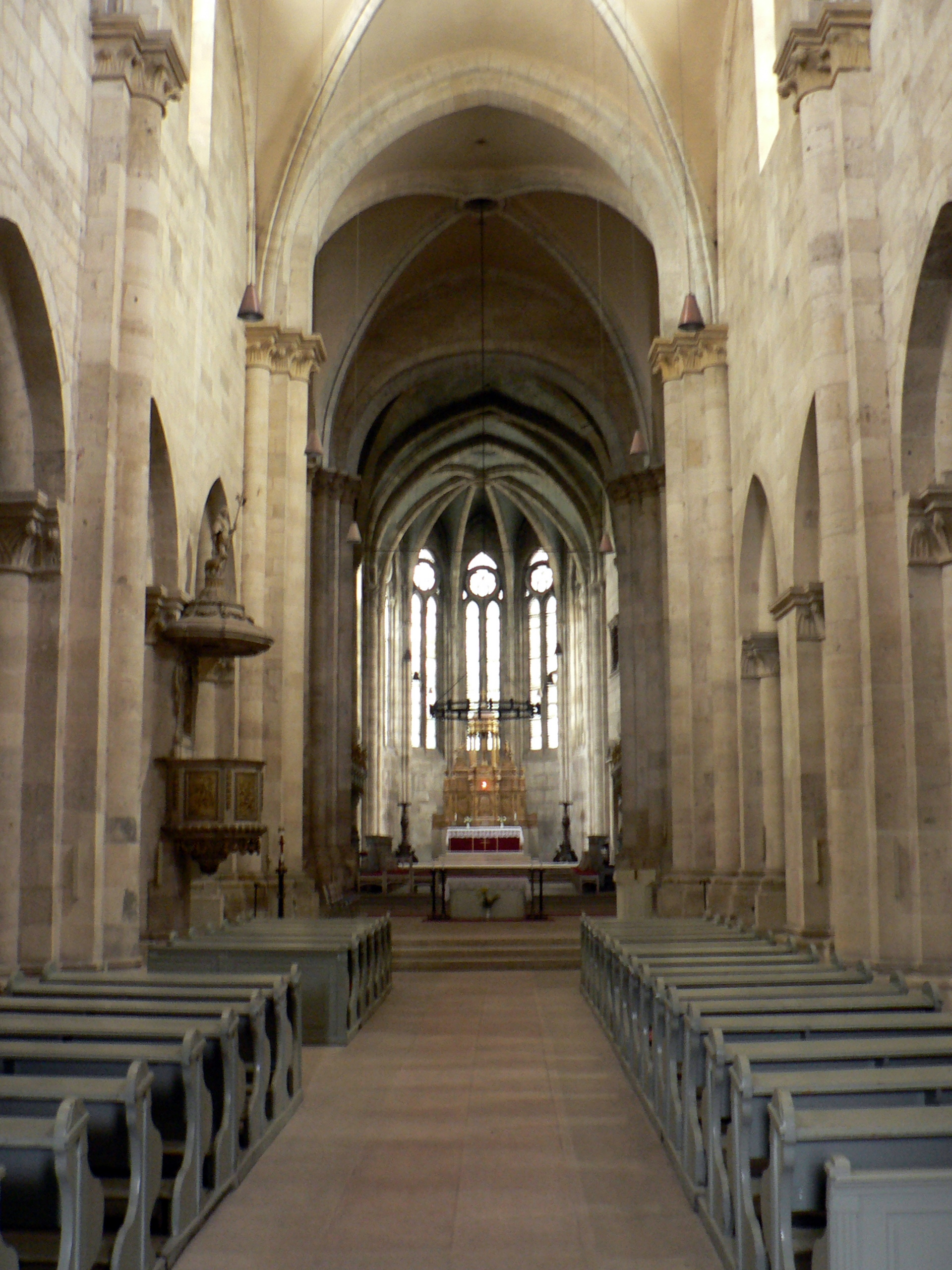
Interior

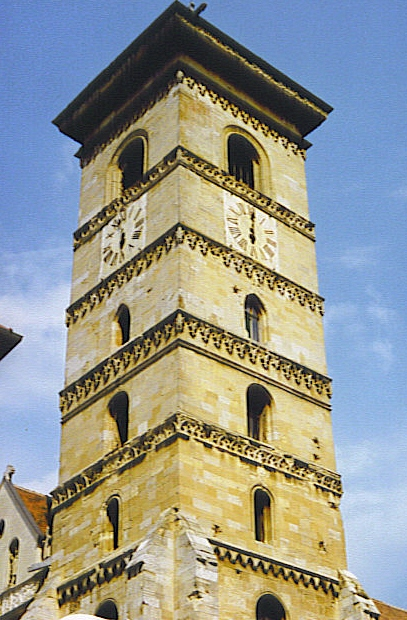
Tower

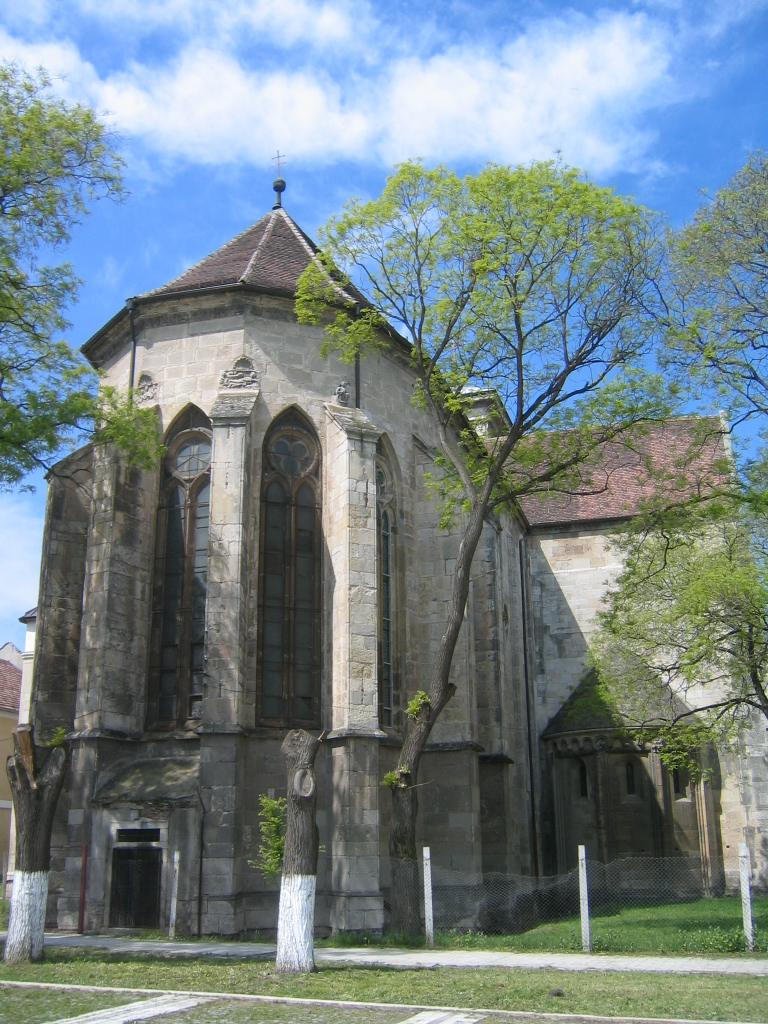
Choir
