= Mikes (surname) =

Mikes is a surname. Notable persons with the surname include:

- Christos Mikes (born 1971), retired Greek footballer
- Éva Mikes (1938-1986), Hungarian pop singer
- George Mikes (1912–1987), Hungarian-born British author
- Kelemen Mikes (1690–1761), Hungarian political figure
- Mihály Mikes (politician) (died 1662), Chancellor of Transylvania from 1656 to 1660
- Mihály Mikes (soldier) (died 1721), Hungarian landowner and aristocrat
- Mike Mikes, American soccer player

== See also ==
- Mikes family
