= Ignác Acsády =

Jewish-Hungarian historian, journalist, fiction writer

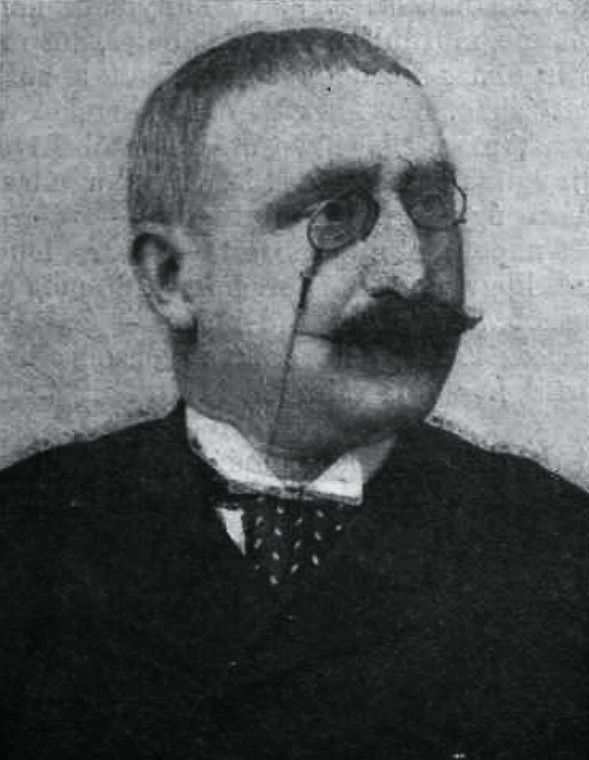
Ignác Acsády

Ignác Acsády (September 9, 1845 – December 17, 1906) was a Jewish-Hungarian historian, journalist, and fiction writer.

== Life ==
Acsády was born on September 9, 1845, in Nagykároly, Hungary. His last name was originally Adler until he changed it in 1875. His father was a wealthy landowner who served as head of the Jewish community in Hajdúszoboszló for thirty years and as a member of the board of Hajdú County.

Acsády attended school in Nagykároly, Debrecen, and Budapest and received his high school diploma in 1866. He initially wanted to be a lawyer, so he stayed in the capital to study law. He received a law degree from the University of Budapest in 1869 and a doctorate from there in 1877, but due to his interest in humanities he decided against a career in law. He began working as a journalist for Századunk, a liberal political daily, in 1869. A year later, he joined the staff of the Budapest newspaper Pesti Napló. While working there, he translated Leopold von Ranke's three volume The History of the Roman Popes and Johann Kaspar Bluntschli's The History of Politics. He began working as a historian in the 1880s and, making use of unpublished archival material related to the 16th, 17th, and 18th centuries, he stressed the historical significance of economic classes, state finances, and population problems. He also wrote essays on the history of financial administration under the Habsburgs. He was one of the first Hungarian historians to make use of the German kulturgeschichte, the predominant trend in the second half of the 19th century. He and Charles Taganyi were the founders of the modern school of Hungarian economic history.

Acsády was on the editorial staff of Pesti Napló under the editor Zsigmond Kemény from 1870 to 1893. Influenced early in his career by Ferenc Deák's politics and József Eötvös's liberal ideas, he opposed Prime Minister Kálmán Tisza and supported the Egyesült Ellenzék (United Opposition), which at the time was led by Albert Apponyi and Dezső Szilágyi. He was a founder of the Jewish periodical Egyenlőség and served as a lifelong anonymous contributor. In his articles and an 1883 pamphlet called Zsidó és nem zsidó magyarok az emancipáció után (Jewish and Non-Jewish Hungarians after the Emancipation), he expressed support for Jewish assimilation and opposition to the immigration of Galician Jews to Hungary. He was elected a member of the Hungarian Academy of Sciences in 1888 and served on its historical committee, although this was the only official acknowledgement he received: his opposition to official Hungarian and Jewish politics made it impossible for him to receive an academic appointment.

Acsády wrote, among other works, Az Általános Államjog és a Politika Története (The Common State Law and the History of Politics) from 1875 to 1876, Az Osztrák Császári Czim és Magyarország (The Austrian Imperial Title and Hungary) in 1877, Zsidó és Nem Zsidó Magyarok az Emanczipáczio után (Jewish and Non-Jewish Hungarians after the Emancipation) in 1883, Széchy Mária in 1885, Magyarország Budavár Visszafoglalása Korában (Hungary at the Time of the Reoccupation of Buda) in 1886, Magyarország Pénzugyei I. Ferdinand Alatt (The Financial Affairs of Hungary under Ferdinand I) in 1888, and Közgardaszégi á Lapotsunk XVI. és XVII. Szazadban (Our Economic Conditions in the Sixteenth and Seventeenth Centuries) in 1889. In 1891, he edited the Kis Cyclopedia for the Athenæum Society. He wrote the fifth and sixth volumes of Szilágyi's National History of Hungary, which were published from 1895 to 1898 for the thousandth anniversary of Hungary's founding. He contributed to a number of Hungarian journals, including Magyar Tanügy, Budapesti Szemle, Századunk, and Magyar Zsidó Szemle.

Acsády was a champion of equal rights for Jews in Hungary since his journalist years. He helped intervene on behalf of Jews during the Tiszaeszlár affair. He wrote extensively on Hungarian-Jewish relations, including Magyar zsidok a XVIII szazadban (Hungarian Jews in the 18th Century) in 1900, Az egyhazi szellem es a zsidok (The Spirit of the Church and the Jews) in 1902, and A zsidok a magyarsug multjaban (The Jews in the Past of Hungary) in 1903. His largest and most famous work was the two-volume A magyar birodalom története (The History of the Hungarian Nation) in 1904, which won him recognition as one of the foremost Hungarian historians, but he then faced bitter attacks from anti-Semites in the Church and universities for the last two years of his life.

Acsády wrote the novel Fridényi bankja (Fridenyi's Bank) in 1882, which criticized the role of money in the contemporary world. His works had an anti-feudal and progressive perspective, which appeared in A magyar birodalom története (History of the Hungarian Empire) and A magyar jobbágyság története (History of Hungarian Serfhood). The latter was translated into Slovakian and Russian. He advised Jews to unite with the peasants against the rising anti-Semitism of the lower and middle classes. In 1894, he founded the Hungarian Jewish Literary Society and served as an active member of the Society as well as the chairman on its committee on documents.

As a fiction writer, Acsády blended realism with romanticism, depicting the social and economic issues of his age, the relations of the Christian and Jewish bourgeoisie and the nobility, and the omnipotence of money. From 1891 to 1893, he edited the reference lexicon Kézi lexikon, the first of its kind in Hungary. He published various monographs and studies for general journals, Magyar Zsidó Szemle (Hungarian Jewish Review), and the IMIT Évkönyv (Yearbook of the Israelite Hungarian Literary Society). He was one of the initiators of the statistical method in Hungary. He was influenced by Auguste Comte's positivism and Herbert Spencer's organic sociology. His last work was a study written for the Hungarian edition of Heinrich Graetz's History of the Jews, which was published from 1906 to 1908.

Acsády died in Budapest on December 17, 1906.

After World War II, a Budapest street was named after him and a plaque was dedicated in his memory.
