= Mihály Mikes =

Mihály Mikes may refer to:

- Mihály Mikes (politician) (died 1662), Chancellor of Transylvania from 1656 to 1660
- Mihály Mikes (soldier) (died 1721), Hungarian landowner and aristocrat
