= János Szalárdi =

Hungarian historian

János Szalárdi (23 July 1601 – 27 September 1666) was a Hungarian historian in the Principality of Transylvania.

He was appointed one of the conservators of the Transylvanian Archives in Gyulafehérvár (today: Alba Iulia, Romania). He served as Secretary of the Chancellery (1644–1649) during the reign of George I Rákóczi when the position of Chancellor was vacant since 1634, the death of István Kovacsóczy. Later he was appointed Secretary for Prince of Transylvania. He participated in the Transylvanian Diet of 1666 which commissioned him to collection of taxes of the Partium, Kolozs, Doboka and Inner Szolnok Counties. Szalárdi died in Fogaras (today: Făgăraș, Romania).

== Works ==
- The Nine Books of Chronicle Lamentations (edited after manuspricts by Zsigmond Kemény in Pest, 1853). Excellent reference work for the history of Transylvania after George II Rákóczi's unfortunate campaign of 1657.

== Sources ==
- Hungarian Biographical Lexikon
