= Matthias Vehe =

Matthias Vehe known as Glirius (c.1545-1590) was a German Protestant religious radical, who converted to a form of Judaism and anti-trinitarianism, rejecting the New Testament as revelation.

The identity of Vehe and the writer Glirius, who published Mattanjah (Knowledge of God, 1578) in Cologne, was established by G. E. Lessing. The history of the group including Vehe has been reconsidered by recent scholarship.

== Life ==
He was born in Ballenberg, and brought up in Königshofen. He studied at the University of Heidelberg, and at the University of Rostock under David Chytræus.

He was arrested by the local Church Council with others in 1570, as a dissenter from the Calvinism being introduced by the Elector Palatine. He was at that time deacon at Kaiserslautern. Adam Neuser, later a convert to Islam, eventually escaped with help from Simon Grynaeus. Johannes Sylvan was executed, in 1572. Two others involved were Jacob Suter and Johann Hasler.

He took refuge in Transylvania, teaching at the Unitarian college at Kolozsvár (now Cluj-Napoca, in Romania), where Ferenc Dávid was the head. Others with radical Christian views there were Jacobus Palaeologus and Christian Francken.

Vehe's followers András Eőssi and Simon Péchi founded the Szekler Sabbatarians, after Dávid died in prison in 1579. It has been said that Vehe was primarily responsible (as Faustus Socinus claimed) for the 1581 Defensio Francisci Davidis. By then he had been expelled from Kolozsvár.

He spent most of the rest of his life in Poland, publishing under pseudonyms. He returned to Germany in 1589, was arrested, and died in December 1590.
