= Imreffy family =

Hungarian noble family

House of Imreffy
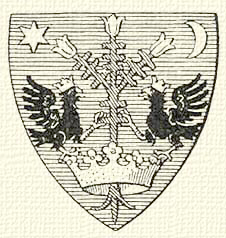
- Parent house: Genus Győr
- Country: Kingdom of Hungary
- Founded: 15th century
- Founder: György I
- Final head: Farkas
- Dissolution: 1628

Imreffy de Szerdahely (or Imreffi) was a Hungarian noble family from the kindred of Győr.

== Origins ==
The forefather of the family was Péter (c. 1321 – c. 1347), the second son of Ders Szerdahelyi. He inherited the Pauline monastery in Szerdahely (today Kaposszerdahely) from his elder brother, Miklós (the ancestor of the Dersffy family). However the lordship of Szerdahely itself remained in Miklós' hand.

Péter's great-great grandchild, György was the first member who used the surname of "Imreffy" (son of Imre after his father). His siblings also took the Imreffy last name.

== Notable members ==
- Miklós, brother of György, Vice-ispán (Viscount; vicecomes) of Tolna County
- Mihály (c. 1458 – 1536), son of György, Master of the horse, captured in the Battle of Mohács
- János (c. 1559-60 – 9 July 1611), Chancellor of Transylvania (1610–1611) for Gabriel Báthory, killed in the Battle of Brassó (today: Brașov, Romania).
- János' son, Mihály was the last member of the Transylvanian branch. His wife was Erzsébet Zólyomi. Together they owned Sólyomkő Castle (now in Aleșd, Romania). Mihály died sometimes before 1622, when his widow married Gabriel Movilă, a former prince of Wallachia, who spent his exile in Transylvania.
- Farkas, the last member of the family died in 1628.

== Sources ==
- János Karácsonyi: A magyar nemzetségek a XIV. század közepéig. Budapest: Magyar Tudományos Akadémia. 1900–1901.
- Kislexikon.hu
