= Simon Péchi =

Wealthy Hungarian and Sabbatarian

Chancellor of Transylvania
- In office 1613–1621
- Monarch: Gabriel Bethlen
- Preceded by: Vacant last office-holder: János Imreffy
- Succeeded by: Vacant next office-holder: István Kovacsóczy

Personal details
- Born: 1570 Peçuy, Sanjak of Peçuy, Ottoman Hungary (today: Pécs, Hungary)
- Died: December 1643 (aged 72-73) Szenterzsébet, Principality of Transylvania (today: Eliseni, Romania)
- Spouse(s): 1, Judit Kornis; 2, Katalin Barlabássy

Chancellor Simon Péchi (c. 1570/1575–1642) was a Hungarian Székely official, and wealthy supporter of Matthias Vehe and nobleman András Eőssi's Szekler Sabbatarians movement in Transylvania. The influence of Péchi's Sabbatarian prayer book contributed to the conversion of around twenty thousand Székelys to Sabbatarianism in the late sixteenth century. Samuel Kohn, Chief Rabbi of Budapest, and the first scholar to take an interest in the Sabbatarians among the Transylvanian unitarians, published a biography of Péchi as part of his studies in 1899.

== Works ==
- Atyák mondásai — Pirqé ávot

Political offices
Preceded by Vacant; Title last held by János Imreffy	Chancellor of Transylvania; 1613–1621	Succeeded by Vacant; Title next held by István Kovacsóczy
