= Szekler Sabbatarians =

Transylvanian and Hungarian Unitarian religious group

The Szekler Sabbatarians (in Transylvanian Saxon: (Siebenbürgen) Sambatianer; in German: Siebenbürgische Sabbatianer; in Hungarian: Szombatosok, zombatosok, sabbatariusok, zsidózók, Şomrei Sabat) were a religious group in Transylvania and Hungary between the sixteenth and nineteenth centuries who held Unitarian and Judaizing beliefs, including the affirmation of Seventh-day Sabbatarianism.

== History ==
The Magyar Sabbatarians arose among Transylvanian Unitarians, led by Matthias Vehe's followers András Eőssi and Simon Péchi who founded the Sabbatarians in 1588, after Ferenc Dávid died in prison and the Unitarian church formalised on a non-Sabbatarian line. Initially they believed Jesus to be the messiah, but a human rather than divine messiah. Gradually they passed to read only the Old Testament and to celebrate Torah's feasts, follow dietary laws, and a strict observance of seventh-day Sabbath, but not circumcision.

Most of their followers were of Székely ethnicity and had experienced periods of tolerance and persecution. On May 23, 1621, Simon Péchi, the Chancellor of Transylvania was dismissed and arrested for political reasons at the order of Prince Gabriel Bethlen. On September 29 of the following year, the Transylvanian Diet made a law against the Judaizers. Thirteen years later, on May 13, 1635, the Diet set the explicit deadline of Christmas Day 1635 for the Sabbatarians to convert to one of the four accepted Christian religions of the Principality. When the great persecution began in 1635 they numbered 20,000 members.

Starting May 23, 1638, Sabbatarian believers were tortured and their writings confiscated in Kolozsvár and Marosvásárhely. On July 7, the trials started in Dés. All property of the convicted was confiscated, and they were sentenced to prison and, by the decree of Prince George I Rákóczi, to hard labor as well. A Sabbatarian goldsmith from Kolozsvár, János Torockai, was condemned to be stoned to death. On July 14, Simon Péchi was sentenced to prison and died next year.

The believers had to practice their religion in secret for the next 230 years, while pretending to be Catholic or Unitarian, so their numbers were in the hundreds only when their conversion to Judaism was allowed from 1868 to 1874.

At the insistence of Dr. Beck, the Bucharest rabbi, József Bánóczi and Prof. Wilhelm Bacher took the necessary steps to save from ruin the last Sabbatarian congregation in Bözödújfalu (Bezidu Nou in Romanian) and set up schools. In a few generations, most Sabbatarians had converted to Judaism. In the 1910 census, 120 people out of the 679 inhabitants of Bözödújfalu were Jewish.

During the Holocaust, first, the Sabbatarians were given exemption from the Hungarian anti-Jewish laws in 1941. But in April 1944, during the ghettoization, they were also herded to the ghettos. The local priest of Bözödújfalu hurried to the SS commandant and proved to him that the Sabbatarians are originally not from the Jewish "race". But there were numerous intermarriages between the Sabbatarians and Jews in the preceding decades. So the priest was able to take out some people from the ghettos, while others were soon sent to Auschwitz. The surviving Sabbatarians emigrated to Israel after the war.

== Cultural references ==
The Magyar writer Zsigmond Kemény wrote about the sect leader, Simon Pechi, in his A rajongók, "The Devoted" (1858).

== See also ==
- Subbotniks
- Abrahamites
- Khalyzians
- Kabar
- Heresy of the Judaizers
- Gerim
