= Șona =

Șona Szépmező
- Commune
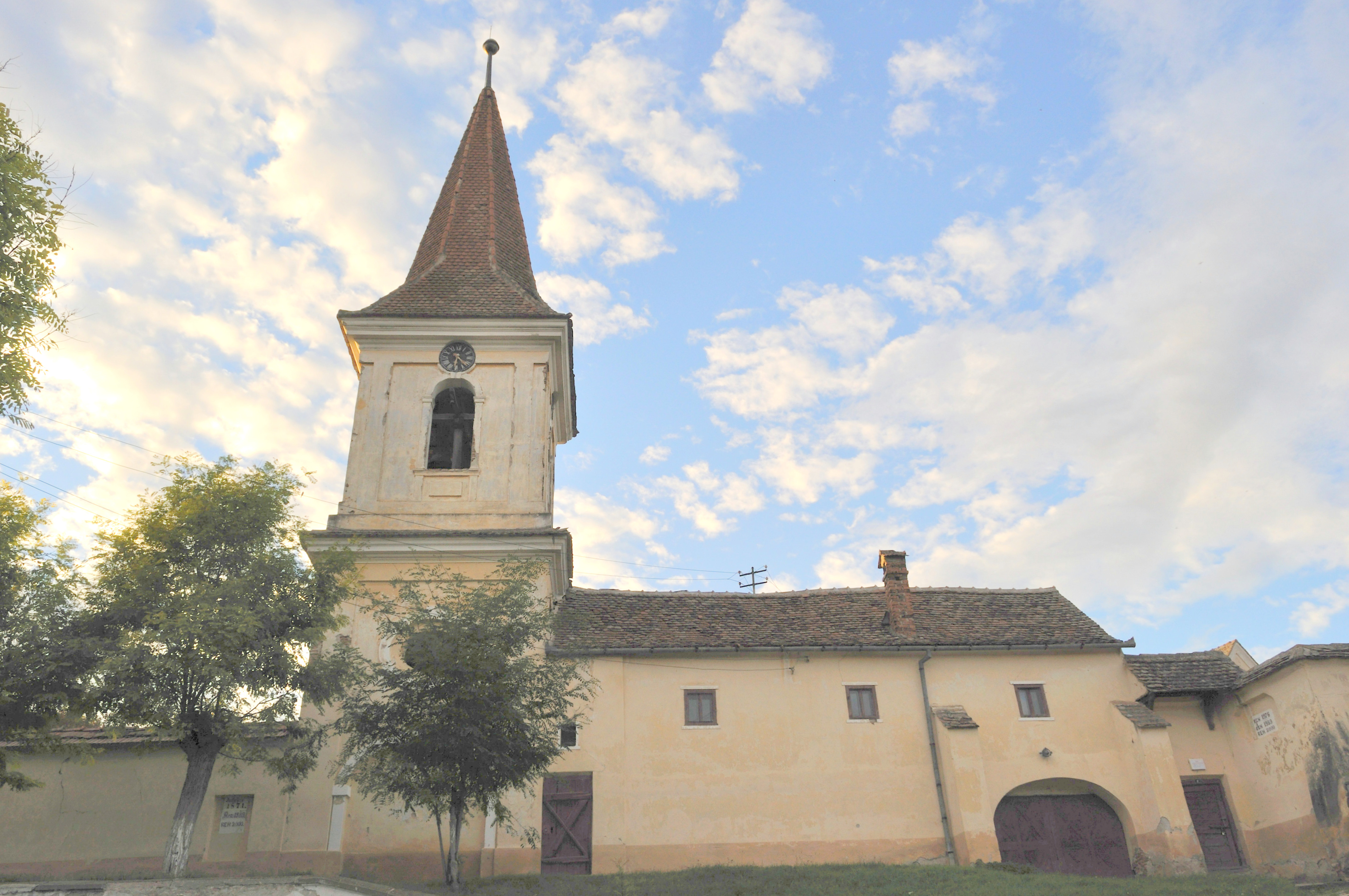
- Fortified church in Șona

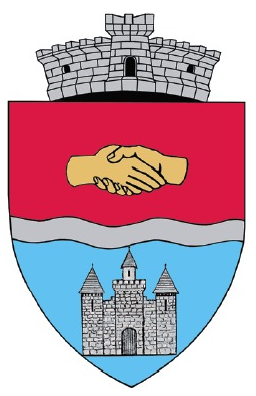
- Coat of arms

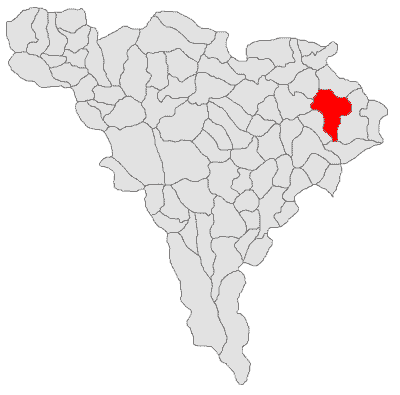
- Location in Alba County

- Location in Romania
- Coordinates: 46°13′N 24°01′E
- Country: Romania
- County: Alba

Government
  - Mayor (2020–2024): Teodor-Florin Mărginean (PNL)
- Area: 105.8 km^{2} (40.8 sq mi)
- Elevation: 286 m (938 ft)
- Population (2021-12-01): 3,782
  - Density: 35.75/km^{2} (92.58/sq mi)
- Time zone: UTC+02:00 (EET)
  - Summer (DST): UTC+03:00 (EEST)
- Postal code: 517755
- Area code: +40 258
- Vehicle reg.: AB
- Website: comunasona.ro

Șona (German: Schönau; Hungarian: Szépmező) is a commune located in Alba County, Transylvania, Romania. It is composed of seven villages: Alecuș (Elekes), Biia (Magyarbénye), Doptău (Dobtanya), Lunca Târnavei (until 1964 Spini; Kistövis), Sânmiclăuș (Betlenszentmiklós), Șona, and Valea Sasului (Szászvölgy).

== Geography ==
The commune lies on the Transylvanian Plateau, on the banks of the Târnava Mică River. It is located in the northeastern part of the county, 10 km (6.2 mi) from Blaj and 50 km (31 mi) from the county seat, Alba Iulia. Șona is crossed by county road DJ107, which connects Blaj to Târnăveni, Mureș County.

== Demographics ==
Historical population
Year	Pop.	±%
1850	4,301	—
1900	5,635	+31.0%
1941	7,024	+24.6%
1977	5,939	−15.4%
1992	4,647	−21.8%
2002	4,514	−2.9%
2011	4,067	−9.9%
2021	3,782	−7.0%
Source: Census data

At the 2011 census, there were 4,067 inhabitants, 68.5% of whom were Romanians, 25.2% Hungarians, and 5.8% Roma. At the 2021 census, Șona had a population of 3,782, of which 56.5% were Romanians, 20.65% Hungarians, and 12.4% Roma.

== Sights ==
Notable sights include the Șona fortified church, dating to the 16th century, and the Bethlen castle in Sânmiclăuș, dating to the 17th century.

== Natives ==
- Farkas Bethlen (1639 – 1679), Hungarian nobleman and chronicler, Chancellor of Transylvania from 1678 to 1679
