= Hungarian resistance =

Hungarian resistance may refer to:

- Passive Resistance (Hungary), 19th-century opposition to Austrian domination of Hungary
- Hungarian resistance movement, opposition to the Axis within Hungary during World War II
