= Mihály Imreffy =

- Lord of Szerdahely
- Born: c. 1458
- Died: 1536
- Noble family: House of Imreffy
- Spouses: Krisztina Podmaniczky de Podmanin; Anna (unknown surname)
- Issue: six children
- Father: György Imreffy de Szerdahely
- Mother: Zsófia Jakcs de Kusaly

Mihály Imreffy de Szerdahely (c. 1458-60 – 1536) was a Hungarian soldier and noble from the Imreffy family, who was master of the horse (Hungarian: lovászmester), which was one of the high dignitaries in the Kingdom of Hungary.

== Biography ==
He was born into the Szerdahely branch of the gens Győr around 1458. His father, György was the first to use the surname of Imreffy (lit. "son of Imre", after Mihály's grandfather). Mihály first married Krisztina Podmaniczky de Podmanin. The last name of his second wife, Anna, is unknown. He had six children. His great-grandchild János was Chancellor of Transylvania in the beginning of the 17th century.

He was present at the Diet of Rákos in 1505 where the magnates decided that they would no longer elect a king from abroad ("order of Rákos"). He participated in the tragically ending Battle of Mohács, where he was captured by the Ottoman Army. Later, he was released by Pargalı Ibrahim Pasha, Grand Vizier of the Ottoman Empire.

During the Hungarian Civil War (1526–1538) he joined the league of Ferdinand I who appointed him castellan of Buda, together with Tamás Nádasdy.

== Sources ==
- Kislexikon.hu
