= István Kendi =

Hungarian politician

Chancellor of Transylvania
- In office 31 March 1608 – 20 March 1610
- Monarch: Gabriel Báthory
- Preceded by: János Petki
- Succeeded by: János Imreffy

Personal details
- Died: c. 1628
- Spouse(s): Zsuzsanna Csapy; Anna Horváth

István Kendi de Szarvaskend (Kendy; ? – c. 1628) was a Hungarian noble in the Principality of Transylvania, who served as Chancellor of Transylvania from 31 March 1608 to 20 March 1610.

== Biography ==
He was the only son of Sándor Kendi, a member of the Transylvanian Royal Council. He had three sisters: Zsuzsanna (wife of Balthasar Báthory), Krisztina (second wife of Farkas Kovacsóczy) and Zsófia. His father was executed without any trial by Prince Sigismund Báthory in 1594. He regained his father's confiscated estates and property in October 1600.

István Kendi married twice: his first wife was Zsuzsanna Csapy, stepdaughter of Prince Sigismund Rákóczi, the second one was Anna Horváth de Palocsa since 1618. He had a daughter.

=== Career ===
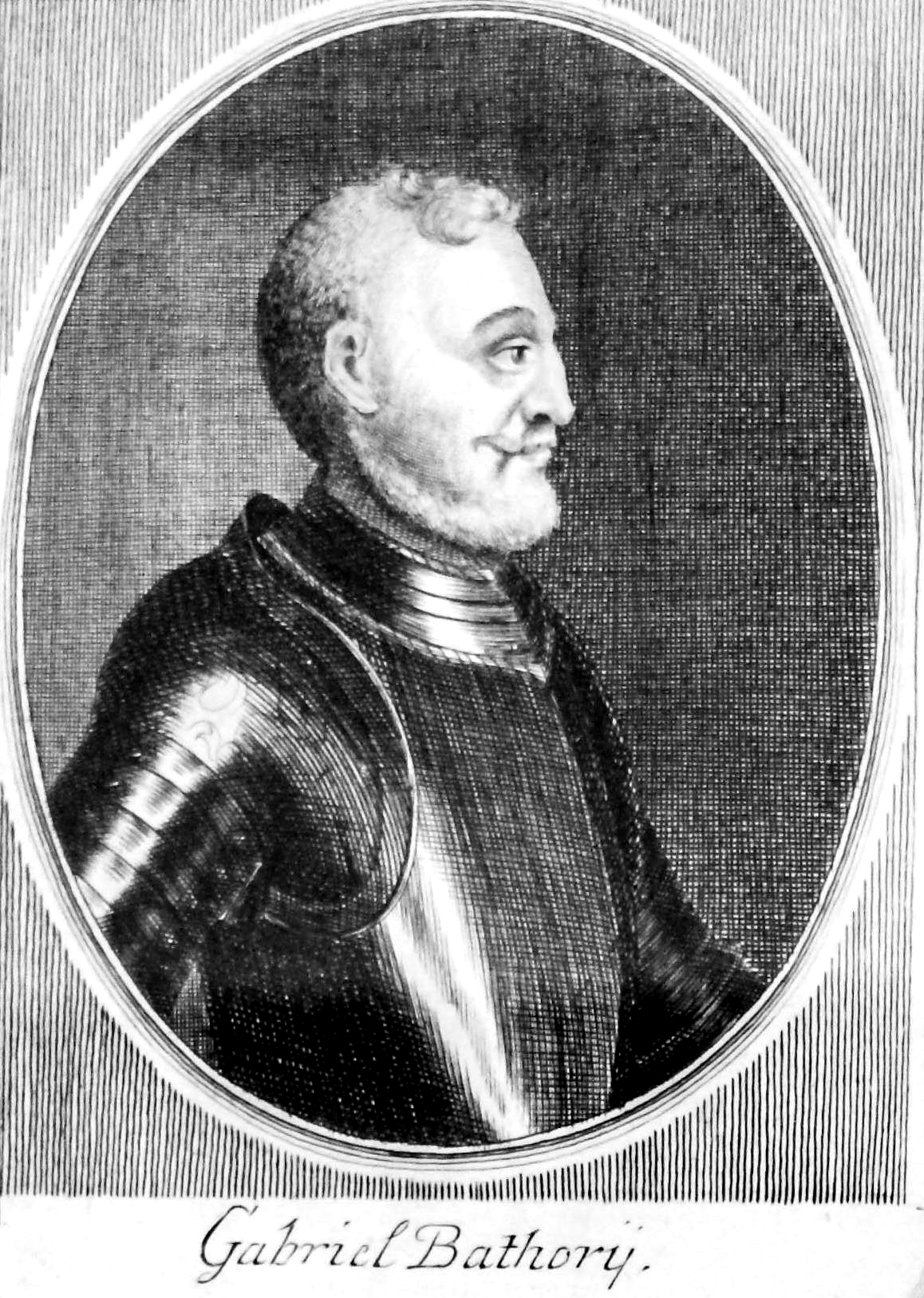
Kendi tried to murder Prince Gabriel Báthory in 1610

After his father's death, he functioned as Lord Lieutenant (Count; comes) of Doboka County since 1595. He participated in the uprising of Mózes Székely in 1603 and was captured by General Giorgio Basta for a short time. He acted as lieutenant and mediator of the diplomatic affairs for Stephen Bocskay in 1605. He served again as head of Doboka County from 1605 to 1610 and elected member of the Transylvanian Royal Council.

After the resignation of János Petki, he was appointed Chancellor of Transylvania by Prince Gabriel Báthory from whom he received the castle of Szamosújvár (today: Gherla, Romania) as a donation in 1609. Soonly he involved in the conspiracy against the prince for family reasons. He made a contact with Michael Weiß, judge (mayor) of Brassó (today: Brașov, Romania).

On 20 March 1610, Boldizsár Kornis, the Captain General of the Székelys, and he tried to kill his guest, Báthory with an assassin in his estate, Szék (today: Sic, Romania), however the hired man exposed them. Korni was executed and Kendi escaped to the area of Kingdom of Hungary from the revenge of the Prince. Kendi was sentenced to death in absentia. He resided in Kassa (today: Košice, Slovakia).

Kendi received amnesty from the new Transylvanian ruler Gabriel Bethlen and became again a member of the Royal Council in March 1614. However he had to fled Transylvania in the end of the year. As one of the several pretender to the throne, he attacked the principality in 1615 but Bethlen could keep his seat. Kendi married Anna Horváth de Palocsa, widow of Gabriel Báthory, in 1618. He died around 1628 in Hungary. There are opinions that he had no successor, while according to others the Cégény branch (cégényi) of the Kende family can be derived from him.

== Sources ==
- Markó, László: A magyar állam főméltóságai Szent Istvántól napjainkig – Életrajzi Lexikon p. 112. (The High Officers of the Hungarian State from Saint Stephen to the Present Days – A Biographical Encyclopedia) (2nd edition); Helikon Kiadó Kft., 2006, Budapest; ISBN 963-547-085-1.
- Trócsányi, Zsolt: Erdély központi kormányzata 1540–1690. Budapest, Akadémiai Kiadó, 1980. p. 106.' ISBN 963 05 2327 2

Political offices
Preceded by János Petki	Chancellor of Transylvania; 1608–1610	Succeeded by János Imreffy
