= János Imreffy =

Hungarian soldier (c. 1559–1611)

Chancellor of Transylvania
- In office Spring 1610 – 9 July 1611
- Monarch: Gabriel Báthory
- Preceded by: István Kendi
- Succeeded by: Vacant next office-holder: Simon Péchi

Personal details
- Born: c. 1559–1560
- Died: 9 July 1611 Brassó, Principality of Transylvania (today: Brașov, Romania)
- Spouse: Kata Iffjú

János Imreffy de Szerdahely (Imreffi; c. 1559-60 – 9 July 1611) was a Hungarian soldier and noble in the Principality of Transylvania, who served as Chancellor of Transylvania from Spring 1610 to his death on 9 July 1611. He was a member of the Imreffy family of old origin.

== Biography ==
János Imreffy was a grandson of Mihály Imreffy, castellan of Buda. His parents were János, Sr. and Margit Forgách de Ghymes et Gács. He inhretied Diószeg (today: Sládkovičovo, Slovakia) from his mother. He moved to Transylvania at young age. He married Kata Iffjú, daughter of János Iffjú, a member of the Transylvanian Royal Council and Margit Majláth. Due to that marriage, he became relative to the Báthory de Somlyó family, because his wife was half-sister of Balthasar Báthory, Stephen Báthory (father of Gabriel Báthory) and Cardinal Andrew Báthory. Imreffy also became the lord of Alvinc (today: Vinţu de Jos, Romania).

In 1593, he served envoy of Sigismund Báthory to Christoph Teuffenbach, Captain General of Kassa (today: Košice, Slovakia). After 1598, he moved to the Partium where served as familiar of Judge royal Stephen Báthory de Ecsed. There he met Gabriel Báthory for the first time. Imreffy joined to Stephen Bocskay's War of Independence and became a member of the Royal Council. He also functioned as the treasurer of Bocskay's army in the summer of 1605. He successfully crushed the rebellion of Serb militia in Lippa (today: Lipova, Romania).

He had an active role in the election of Gabriel Báthory as Prince of Transylvania in 1608. Since then he served as President of the Royal Council. After the betrayal of István Kendi, who tried to murder Prince Gabriel, Imreffy was appointed Chancellor of Transylvania. Soon, the Transylvanian Civil War broke out. He was killed in the Battle of Brassó (today: Brașov, Romania) against Radu Şerban in 1611.

== Sources ==
- Markó, László: A magyar állam főméltóságai Szent Istvántól napjainkig – Életrajzi Lexikon p. 108. (The High Officers of the Hungarian State from Saint Stephen to the Present Days – A Biographical Encyclopedia) (2nd edition); Helikon Kiadó Kft., 2006, Budapest; ISBN 963-547-085-1.
- Trócsányi, Zsolt: Erdély központi kormányzata 1540–1690. Budapest, Akadémiai Kiadó, 1980. ISBN 963 05 2327 2
- Nagy, László: Imreffi János a magyar históriában: Legendák és tények. Irodalomtörténeti Közlemények, LXXXVI. 1982. 4. (online)

Political offices
| Preceded by István Kendi | Chancellor of Transylvania; 1610–1611 | Succeeded by Vacant; Title next held by Simon Péchi |
