= Demeter Naprágyi =

Hungarian prelate of the Roman Catholic Church

- Archbishop of Kalocsa
- Archdiocese: Kalocsa
- Installed: 1608
- Term ended: 1619
- Predecessor: István Szuhay
- Successor: Bálint Lépes
- Other posts: Canon of Esztergom; Grand Provost of Eger; Provost of Arad; Bishop of Szerém; Bishop of Transylvania; Provost of Pozsony; Bishop of Veszprém; Bishop of Győr

Personal details
- Born: 1564 Naprágy, Kingdom of Hungary (today: Neporadza, Slovakia)
- Died: before 5 March 1619 Győr, Kingdom of Hungary
- Denomination: Catholic

Demeter Naprágyi (Náprágyi, Napragyi, Napraghy or Napragi; 1564 – before 5 March 1619) was a Hungarian prelate of the Roman Catholic Church, who served as bishop of several dioceses. He was the Archbishop of Kalocsa from 1608 to 1619. He also functioned as Chancellor of Transylvania between 1598 and 1600.

== Life ==
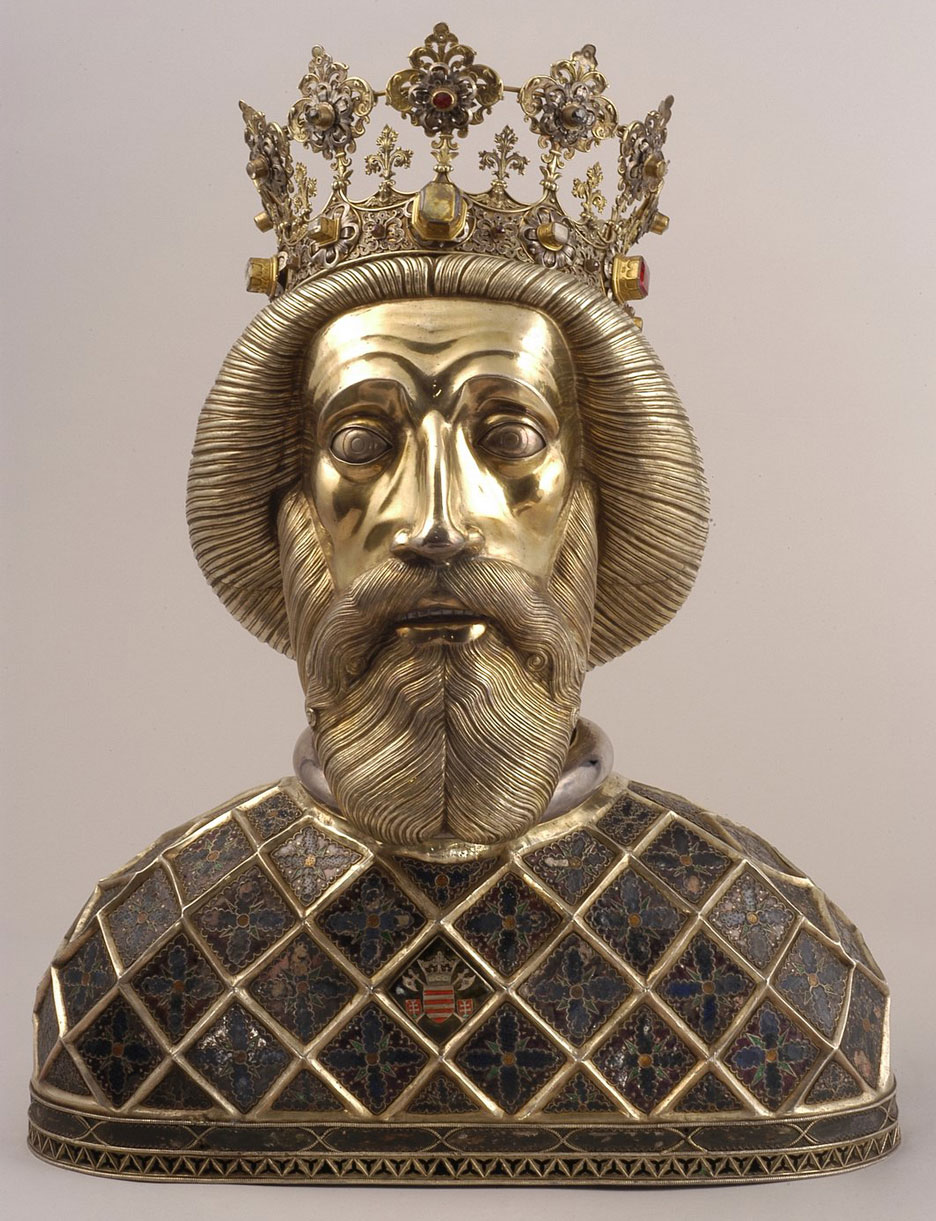
St. Ladislaus' reliquary – Demeter carried to Győr

Naprágyi was born into a noble family from Gömör County (since the 18th century: Gömör és Kis-Hont County) and raised in the court of Bishop of Pécs Miklós Telegdi. He studied theology in Vienna with the aid of the bishop. After ordination, he became director of the Nagyszombat College (today: Trnava, Slovakia). He was appointed Canon of Esztergom by bishop István Radéczy in 1586. Two years later, he served as Grand Provost of Eger. He was the Provost of Arad between 1593 and 1596. He became Bishop of Szerém (Syrmia) in June 1596. He held the office of Bishop of Transylvania since May 1597.

He often worked as envoy of his King, Rudolf. He visited Sigismund III Vasa in 1598. He had also good relationship with Sigismund Báthory.

He was elected Chancellor of Transylvania in 1598, during the reign of Prince Andrew Báthory. He also held the position, when Michael the Brave marched into Transylvania. He was a supporter of the Báthory family, as a result he was banished from Transylvania by the Diet of Gyulafehérvár (today: Alba Iulia, Romania) in January 1601. He carried the herma of Saint Ladislaus and his valuable book collection when left the principality. His episcopal property was seized by the diet.

From 1602, he was the Provost of Pozsony (Pressburg; today: Bratislava, Slovakia). He functioned as Bishop of Veszprém since August 1605 and as Bishop of Győr since December 1606. He was elected Archbishop of Kalocsa in 1608. After the death of Ferenc Forgách (1615), he applied for the position of Archbishop of Esztergom, but failed to reach success: Péter Pázmány, the significant person of the Hungarian Counter-Reformation, was elected head of the Hungarian Roman Catholic Church.

== Bibliography ==
- Jenei, Ferenc: Az utolsó magyar humanista főpap: Naprágyi Demeter. Irodalomtörténeti Közlemények, 1965.
- Markó, László: A magyar állam főméltóságai Szent Istvántól napjainkig - Életrajzi Lexikon p. 115. (The High Officers of the Hungarian State from Saint Stephen to the Present Days - A Biographical Encyclopedia) (2nd edition); Helikon Kiadó Kft., 2006, Budapest; ISBN 963-547-085-1.
- Trócsányi, Zsolt: Erdély központi kormányzata 1540–1690. Budapest, Akadémiai Kiadó, 1980. p. 32.. ISBN 963 05 2327 2

Catholic Church titles
Preceded by Miklós Zelniczey	Bishop of Syrmia; 1596–1601	Succeeded by Simon Bratulics
Preceded by Pál Bornemissza	Bishop of Transylvania; 1597–1605	Succeeded by István Szentandrásy
Preceded by Lajos Újlaki	Bishop of Veszprém; 1605–1606	Succeeded by Bálint Lépes
Preceded by Márton Pethe	Bishop of Győr; 1606–1619	Succeeded by Bálint Lépes
Preceded by István Szuhay	Archbishop of Kalocsa; 1608–1619	Succeeded by Bálint Lépes
Political offices
Preceded by István Jósika	Chancellor of Transylvania; 1598–1600	Vacant Title next held by János Jacobinus
