= Márton Berzeviczy =

Hungarian politician (1538–1596)

Chancellor of Transylvania
- In office January 1578 – 1586
- Monarch: Stephen Báthory
- Preceded by: Imre Sulyok
- Succeeded by: Farkas Kovacsóczy

Personal details
- Born: 1538 Berzevice, Kingdom of Hungary (today: Brezovica, Slovakia)
- Died: 16 February 1596 (aged 57–58) Osiek, Polish–Lithuanian Commonwealth
- Spouse: Katalin Woianowski

Márton Berzeviczy de Berzevicze et Kakaslomnicz (1538 – 16 February 1596) was a Hungarian noble and diplomat in the Principality of Transylvania, who served as Chancellor of Transylvania for Stephen Báthory between January 1578 and 1586.

== Biography ==
He was born into an old noble family of German origin as the son of Kristóf Berzeviczy and Katalin Bertóthy. He married Katalin Woianowski, a German-Polish noblewoman in 1578, they had three children.

Berzeviczy served as recorder for Palatine Tamás Nádasdy since 1558. In the next year he worked for the Hungarian Court Chancellery in Vienna. He studied at the University of Halle-Wittenberg between 1559 and 1560.

== Sources ==
- Markó, László: A magyar állam főméltóságai Szent Istvántól napjainkig – Életrajzi Lexikon pp. 99–100. (The High Officers of the Hungarian State from Saint Stephen to the Present Days – A Biographical Encyclopedia) (2nd edition); Helikon Kiadó Kft., 2006, Budapest; ISBN 963-547-085-1.
- Veress, Endre: Berzeviczy Márton 1538-1596. História antik Könyvesház Kiadó, Budapest, 2012.

Political offices
Preceded by Imre Sulyok	Chancellor of Transylvania; 1578–1586	Succeeded by Farkas Kovacsóczy
