= Bálint Lépes =

Hungarian prelate

- Archbishop of Kalocsa
- Archdiocese: Kalocsa
- Installed: 1619
- Term ended: 1623
- Predecessor: Demeter Naprágyi
- Successor: János Telegdy
- Other posts: Bishop of Knin; Bishop of Nyitra; Bishop of Veszprém; Bishop of Győr

Personal details
- Born: c. 1570 Győr, Kingdom of Hungary
- Died: 26 April 1623 Győr, Kingdom of Hungary
- Denomination: Catholic

Bálint Lépes de Váraskeszi (c. 1570 – 26 April 1623) was a Hungarian prelate of the Roman Catholic Church, who served as bishop of several dioceses. He was the Archbishop of Kalocsa from 1619 to 1623. He also functioned as Royal Chancellor of Hungary between 1608 and 1623. He was a prominent figure of the Counter-Reformation in the Kingdom of Hungary.

== Bibliography ==
- Markó, László: A magyar állam főméltóságai Szent Istvántól napjainkig - Életrajzi Lexikon p. 317. (The High Officers of the Hungarian State from Saint Stephen to the Present Days - A Biographical Encyclopedia) (2nd edition); Helikon Kiadó Kft., 2006, Budapest; ISBN 963-547-085-1.

Catholic Church titles
Preceded by Micatius Migazzi	Bishop of Knin; 1606–1608	Succeeded by György Mátéssy
Preceded by Demeter Naprágyi	Bishop of Veszprém; 1608	Succeeded by Péter Radovics
Preceded by István Fejérkövy	Bishop of Nyitra; 1608–1619	Succeeded by János Telegdy
Preceded by Demeter Naprágyi	Archbishop of Kalocsa; 1619–1623	Succeeded by János Telegdy
Preceded by Demeter Naprágyi	Bishop of Győr; 1619–1623	Succeeded by Miklós Dallos
