= András Eőssi =

András Eőssi (died ca. 1598-1602) of Szenterzsébet (Romanian Eliseni), in Harghita, was a Székely nobleman in Transylvania who founded the Szekler Sabbatarians sect. Eőssi came into contact with Matthias Vehe and, after the death of Ferenc Dávid in 1579, set up the Sabbatarian branch of the Transylvanian Unitarians. He was an autodidact, with followers including Simon Péchi and the Unitarian Miklós Bogáthi Fazekas. The first major study on this group was published in Hungarian in 1899 by Samuel Kohn.
