= János Jacobinus =

Chancellor of Transylvania
- In office April 1603 – 17 July 1603
- Monarch: Mózes Székely
- Preceded by: Vacant
- Succeeded by: Mihály Káthay

Personal details
- Born: 1574 Kolozsvár, Principality of Transylvania (today: Cluj-Napoca, Romania)
- Died: 17 July 1603 (aged 28–29) Brassó, Principality of Transylvania (today: Brașov, Romania)

János Jacobinus (1574 – 17 July 1603) was a Hungarian politician and historian of Saxon origin in the Principality of Transylvania, who served as Chancellor of Transylvania for a short time in 1603.

== Career ==
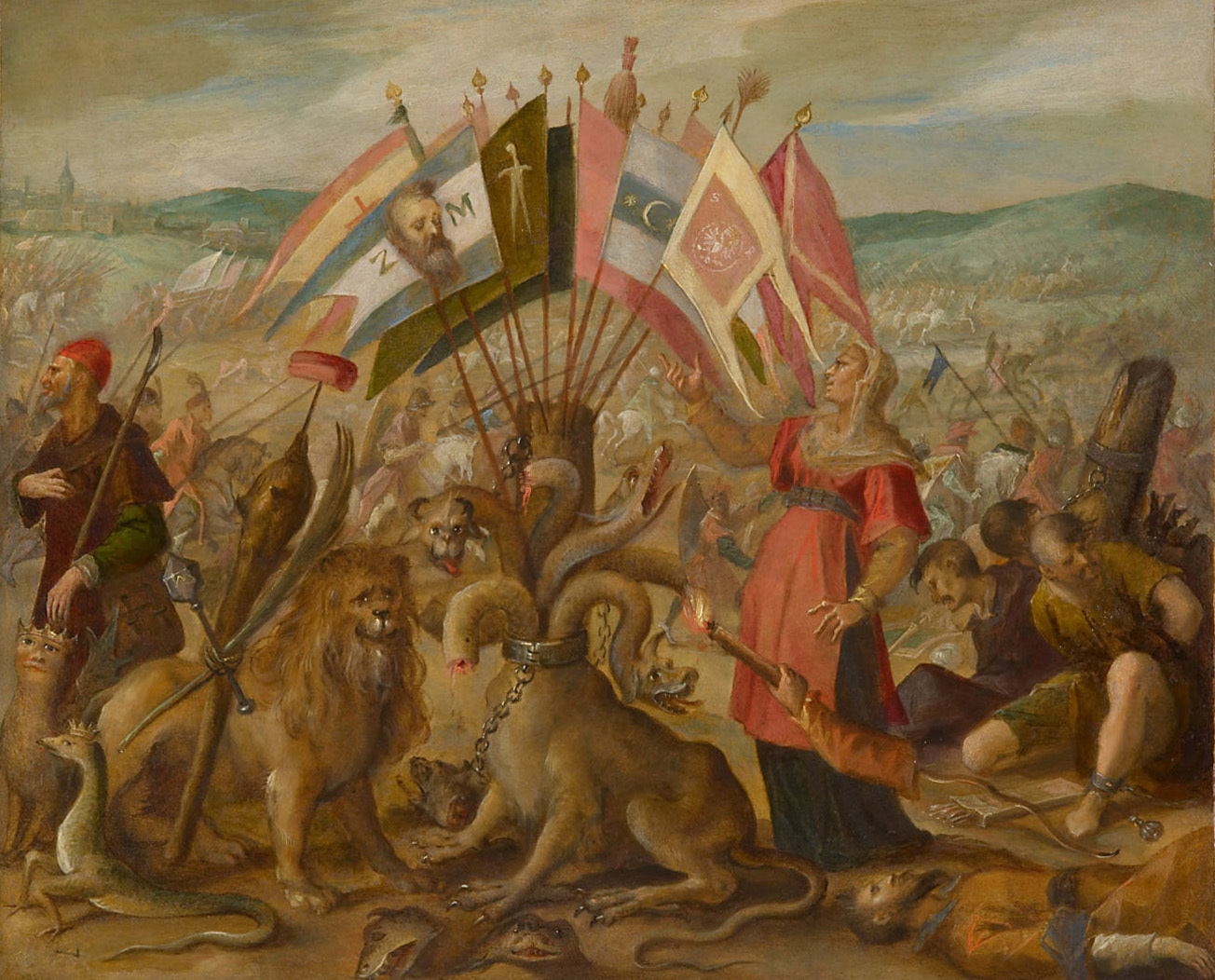
Battle of Brassó, where Jacobinus killed (1603)

He was the son of Bernát Jacobinus, a prestigious citizen of Kolozsvár (today: Cluj-Napoca, Romania). After finishing studies, he became notary of his birthplace between 1592 and 1598. He participated in the Wallachian Campaign of 1595 against Sinan Pasha. He described the events in detail and reliability. He served as secretary for Princes Sigismund Báthory, Andrew Báthory and Michael the Brave since May 1598.

In September 1600, he defected from Michael to the insurgent nobles. He became the secretary of the Transylvanian Chancellery after Sigismund Báthory retake his throne. In this capacity, he, probably, controlled the domestic policy of Transylvania around that time, when the position of Chancellor remained vacant. He joined to Mózes Székely in April 1603 who appointed him as Chancellor. Several months later, he died in the battle of Brassó (today: Brașov, Romania) along with his lord against Radu Şerban, ruler of Wallachia.

For a short time, he was the owner of the Wolphard–Kakas House, an important Renaissance monument on the Main square of Kolozsvár. General István Csáky gave him the house for his services. However the original owner, István Kakas, a diplomat and traveler sued back that from Jacobinus.

== Works ==
- Jacobinus János erdélyi kancellár formuláskönyve (published in 1602).

== Sources ==
- Markó, László: A magyar állam főméltóságai Szent Istvántól napjainkig – Életrajzi Lexikon p. 109. (The High Officers of the Hungarian State from Saint Stephen to the Present Days – A Biographical Encyclopedia) (2nd edition); Helikon Kiadó Kft., 2006, Budapest; ISBN 963-547-085-1.
- Trócsányi, Zsolt: Erdély központi kormányzata 1540–1690. Budapest, Akadémiai Kiadó, 1980. pp. 181–182. ISBN 963 05 2327 2

Political offices
Preceded by Vacant; Title last held by Demeter Naprágyi	Chancellor of Transylvania; 1603	Succeeded by Mihály Káthay
