= János Petki =

Hungarian politician (1572–1612)

Chancellor of Transylvania
- In office March 1607 – 31 March 1608
- Monarch: Sigismund Rákóczi
- Preceded by: Vacant last office-holder: Mihály Káthay
- Succeeded by: István Kendi

Personal details
- Born: 1572 Sárospatak, Kingdom of Hungary
- Died: 23 October 1612 (aged 39–40) Brassó, Principality of Transylvania (today: Brașov, Romania)
- Spouse: Katalin Kornis

János Petki de Ders (1572 – 23 October 1612) was a Hungarian noble and poet in the Principality of Transylvania, who served as Chancellor of Transylvania from March 1607 to 31 March 1608. He was the maternal grandfather of Prince Michael I Apafi.

== Family ==
He was the only child of Mihály Petki (d. 1577) and Margit Daczó de Sepsiszentgyörgy. He married Katalin Kornis de Homoródszentpál (c. 1581–1637), daughter of Farkas Kornis, whom his four children were born:

- Ilona: married Ferenc Mikó
- Zsuzsanna: married Péter Gávai
- Borbála (d. 1660): married György Apafi de Apanagyfalu (1588–1635), who served as Lord Lieutenant (Count; comes) of Küküllő County. Their son, Michael I Apafi was born in 1632.
- Ferenc (d. 1633): Lord Lieutenant (Count; comes) of Doboka County, married Katalin Kovacsóczy

== Biography ==
=== Early life ===
He studied in Sárospatak between 1584 and 1585 under the supervision his close relative and godfather, István Melith. He served as aulae familiaris (marshal) in the court of Balthasar Báthory from the end of the 1580s. Presumably he served there until the execution of Balthasar by his cousin, Sigismund Báthory in 1594. Later he moved to the Transyvanian Royal Court and became aulae familiaris again for Regent Maria Christina of Austria, wife of Sigismund Báthory who fled Transylvania in 1597 at the first time.

Under Prince Andrew Báthory, he participated in the Battle of Sellenberk in 1599, where the Transyvanian army suffered a severe defeat from Michael the Brave, ruler of Wallachia. Petki was able to escape, along with his father-in-law, Farkas Kornis, from the battle to Görgény (today: Gurghiu, Romania). They were nearly captured in 1600, their possessions were seized by Michael the Brave. In the next year, he was a member of the delegation appointed by the Diet of Kolozsvár (today: Cluj-Napoca, Romania) which sent to Moldavia to call back Sigismund Báthory to retake the Transylvanian throne.

=== Political career ===
Petki served as treasurer from 1601 to 1602. He functioned as envoy for Báthory to Poland with a secret mission since the autumn of 1601. Later he moved to Prague. He was also a member of the delegation of the Diet of Gyulafehérvár (today: Alba Iulia, Romania) in 1603 which offered Transylvania to Emperor Rudolf II.

He became Captain of Udvarhelyszék on 19 December 1604. He joined to the uprising of Stephen Bocskay in 1605 who appointed him as General of the Székelys in the next year. After that he joined with the Székely army to commander-in-chief László Gyulaffy. After the illness and death of Gyulaffy, he served as interim commander-in-chief for a short time. Then the new commander Menyhért Bogáthy and him besieged Segesvár (today: Sighișoara, Romania) and played a key role in occupation of the castle. As a reward he was elected to the Royal Council of Bocskay. In 1606, he served as chairman of the Ccmmittee of inquiry which investigated the border clashes between Transylvania and Moldavia. After the death of Bocskay, he accompanied the transportation of the body to Kolozsvár.

János Petki had a decisive role in the election of Sigismund Rákóczi in March 1607. The newly-Prince nominated him as Chancellor of Transylvania. He also became a member of the Royal Council and functioned as General of the Székelys and Captain of Udvarhelyszék. He received as a donation the estates of Nagysajó (today: Şieu, Romania) and Küküllővár (today: Cetatea de Baltă, Romania), previously owned by the late Menyhért Bogáthy. On 31 March 1608, on the day of the election of the new prince, Gabriel Báthory, he resigned from his position on the reason of deterioration of his health.

Báthory did not like Petki, so that he tried to keep him away from Gyulafehérvár. As a result, Petki served as his envoy to Moldavia three times in 1608. Udvarhelyszék rebelled against him in absentia. Báthory took advantage of the situation and replaced him from the position of captain. Along with Pongrác Sennyey he functioned as royal commissioner for reviewing of the Székely donations. He was the Lord Lieutenant (Count; comes) of Doboka County since 1610.

=== Later life ===
In the summer of 1611, he joined to the army of Baron Zsigmond Forgách who invaded Transylvania, but fled to Brassó (today: Brașov, Romania) after the failure of the campaign. The Transylvanian Diet sentenced him to confiscation of property on 25 May 1612. A few months later, he died on 23 October 1612 after a long illness.

== Works ==
- Az Virtusnak és Volvptasnak egy massal valo vetekedesek, kit az Erdelyi Nemes Iffiaknak tanusagara, most fordítottak Magyarul Silius Italicusbol. Kolozsvár, 1610.
- Az unitariusoknak 1627 és 1630 közt kiadott Zsoltáros könyvében van egy jeremiádja.

== Sources ==
- Markó, László: A magyar állam főméltóságai Szent Istvántól napjainkig – Életrajzi Lexikon p. 116. (The High Officers of the Hungarian State from Saint Stephen to the Present Days – A Biographical Encyclopedia) (2nd edition); Helikon Kiadó Kft., 2006, Budapest; ISBN 963-547-085-1.
- Trócsányi, Zsolt: Erdély központi kormányzata 1540–1690. Budapest, Akadémiai Kiadó, 1980. pp. 181–183.' ISBN 963 05 2327 2

Political offices
Preceded by Vacant; Title last held by Mihály Káthay	Chancellor of Transylvania; 1607–1608	Succeeded by István Kendi
