= János Telegdy =

17th-century Hungarian Catholic bishop

Most Reverend János Telegdy
- Archbishop of Kalocsa
- Church: Catholic Church
- Archdiocese: Archdiocese of Kalocsa
- In office: 1623–1647
- Predecessor: Bálint Lépes
- Successor: János Püsky

Orders
- Ordination: 10 February 1594
- Consecration: 25 September 1611 by Roberto Francesco Romolo Bellarmino

Personal details
- Born: 1575 Érsekújvár, Hungary (today Nové Zámky, Slovakia)
- Died: 1647 (age 72) Kalocsa, Hungary

János Telegdy (Hungarian: Telegdy János, Slovak: Ján Telegdy; 1575–1647) was a Roman Catholic prelate who served as Archbishop of Kalocsa (1623–1647), Bishop of Nyitra (1619–1623), Bishop of Várad (1613–1619), and Bishop of Bosnia (1611–1613).

== Biography ==
János Telegdy was born in Érsekújvár, Kingdom of Hungary (today Nové Zámky, Slovakia) in 1575 and ordained a priest in the Diocese of Esztergom on 10 February 1594. On 27 January 1610, he was appointed during the papacy of Pope Paul V as Bishop of Bosnia. On 25 September 1611, he was consecrated bishop by Roberto Francesco Romolo Bellarmino, Cardinal-Priest of San Matteo in Merulana, with Antonio d'Aquino, Bishop of Sarno, and Giulio Sansedoni, Bishop Emeritus of Grosseto, serving as co-consecrators. In 1613, he was appointed during the papacy of Pope Paul V as Bishop of Várad. In March 1619, he was appointed during the papacy of Pope Paul V as Bishop of Nyitra. In 1623, he was appointed during the papacy of Pope Gregory XV as Archbishop of Kalocsa. In 1624, he was once again appointed during the papacy of Pope Gregory XV as Bishop of Nitra. He served as Archbishop of Kalocsa until his death in 1647.

== Episcopal succession ==
While bishop, Telegdy was the principal co-consecrator of:

- János Pyber de Gyerkény, Bishop of Pécs (1614);
- Péter Pázmány, Archbishop of Esztergom (1617);
- István Sennyey, Bishop of Vác (1627);
- György Drašković, Bishop of Pécs (1630); and
- Imre Lósy, Bishop of Várad (1631).

Catholic Church titles
Preceded by Franjo Ergelski Hasanović	Bishop of Bosnia; 1611–1613	Succeeded by Giovanni Thomas Marnavich
Preceded by Miklós Mikáczy	Bishop of Várad; 1613–1619	Succeeded by Ladislas Hosszutotky
Preceded by Bálint Lépes	Bishop of Nyitra; 1619–1623	Succeeded by Giovanni Pusky
Preceded by Bálint Lépes	Archbishop of Kalocsa; 1623–1647	Succeeded by János Püsky
