= Az Athenaeum kézi lexikona =

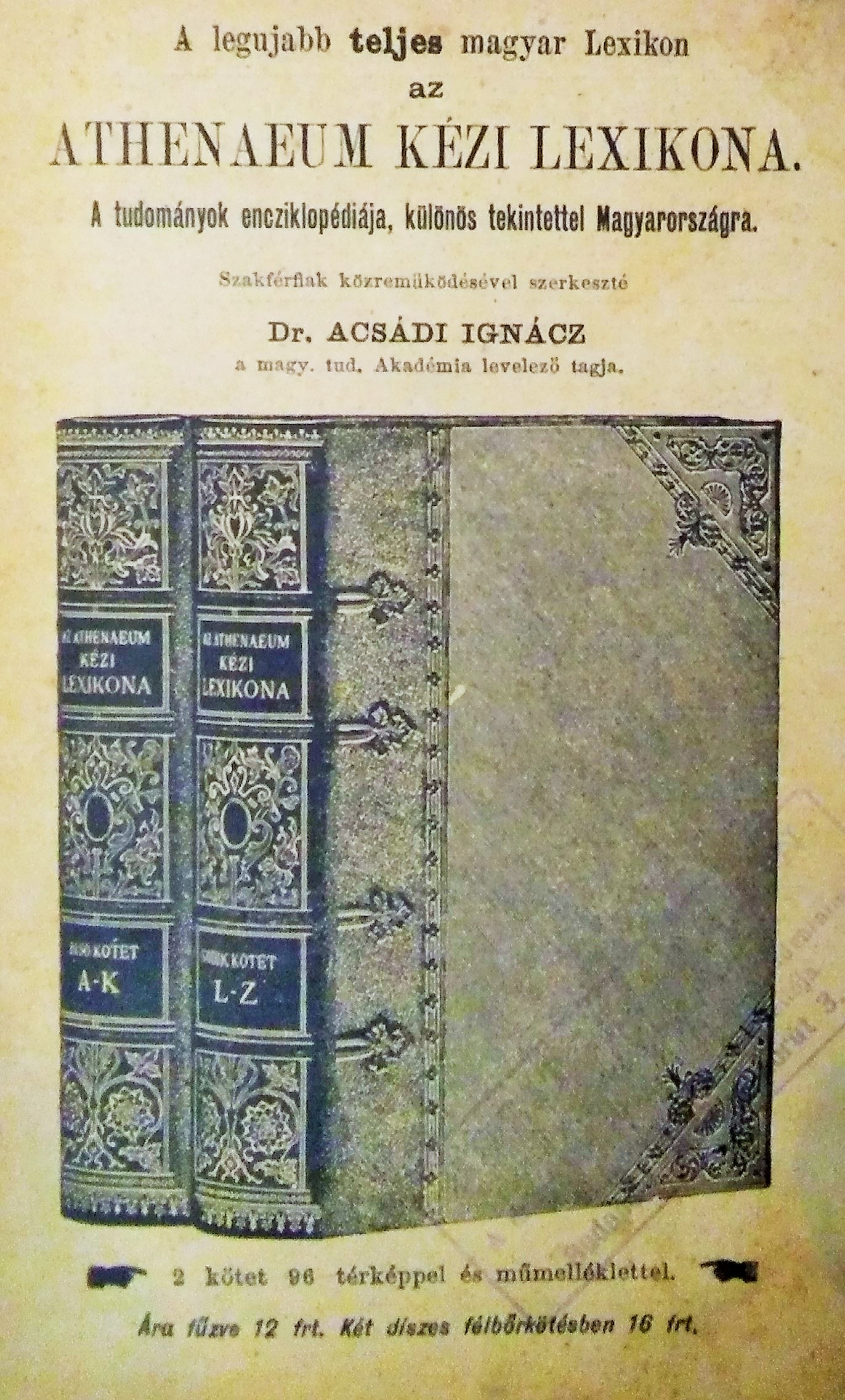
Contemporary advertisement

Az Athenaeum kézi lexikona, in English: Handbook of the Athenaeum, subtitled The Encyclopaedia of Science with Special Reference to Hungary was a two-volume general lexicon in the Hungarian language that was first published at the end of 19th century.

== Description ==
The work was, published in 1892–1893 by Athenaeum Irodalmi és Nyomdai Rt.. It had a total length of about 1,900 pages (more precisely, 3,840 large 8 ° columns) . The cover of the volumes has an ornate design, similar to the large lexicon of Pallas, which appeared almost at the same time.

According to a contemporary book review, the volumes were edited by the historian Ignác Acsády. It listed what was considered to be all branches of human knowledge:

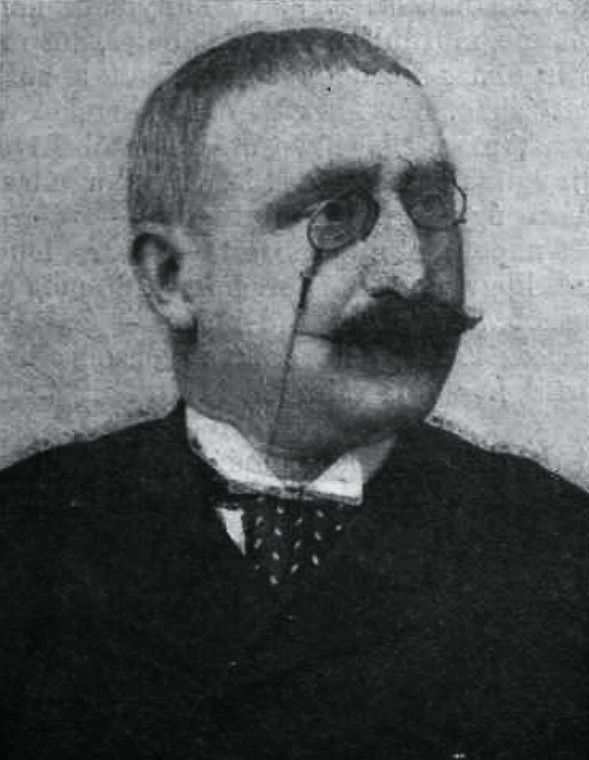
Volume editor, Acsády Ignác

- literature
- history
- law and political science
- economics and finance
- philosophy
- geography
- natural history
- natural science
- astronomy
- chemistry
- medicine
- military sciences
- music
- sports
- engineering, mechanical and technical sciences,
- and biographies

The work was originally written to be used by both professionals and a more general audience, as reflected by the writers' use of "the latest advances, advances, research and data in line with today’s level of science".

The publishers placed great emphasis on making the work a Hungarian-style work, i.e. it also deals in depth with scientific and artistic topics related to Hungary. In addition, pictorial appendices (“16 color worksheets, 32 maps, 34 double-sided blackboards, 14 tables”) were filed to better process knowledge across multiple topics. The goal was to make the lexicon a library for all Hungarian families. At the same time, in order to emphasize its European significance, it was indicated in the description that the work could be a special Hungarian supplement to the famous German Conversations Lexicon. It was offered to customers in an ornate half-leather binding for HUF 14, and in a laced version for HUF 12.

The work does not have a reprint edition,

== Sources ==
- Antikvarium.hu
- Arcanum
- MEK
- Magyar katolikus lexikon I–XV. Főszerk. Diós István; szerk. Viczián János. Budapest: Szent István Társulat. 1993–2010.
