= Passive Resistance (Hungary) =

Era of Hungarian politics in the 19th century

Passive Resistance (passzív ellenállás) is a name attributed to an era of Hungarian politics in the 19th century. It refers to a form of opposition to Austrian domination of Hungary. "Passive resistance" refers in this case to the reluctance of any notable and prestigious personalities to take any position or office or to otherwise engage in politics, and also to certain other acts of non-cooperation. This approach characterized Hungarian public life between 1849 and 1865, with a brief intermezzo in 1860–61. In Hungarian historical context, therefore, the meaning of the term passive resistance is slightly different from in other contexts. Passive resistance, including in the forms practised in Hungary in this period, represents one form of the broader phenomenon of civil resistance.

== First stage - 1849-1860 ==
Passive resistance began immediately after the 1848-1849 war of independence was crushed by the Austrians and Russians in August 1849, and became crystallized as a movement under the "leadership" of Ferenc Deák, a former moderate leader of the Reformist party in the 1840s. In 1850 Austrian minister of justice Anton von Schmerling requested Deák to participate in a committee of the legislation in order to bring about consolidation between Austria and Hungary. Deák's response ("After the dismal events in the near past, under the circumstances that still prevail, my cooperation in public matters is impossible") was widely distributed in secret and served as a call for other notables to join Deák's passive resistance. The journal Pesti Napló, edited by novelist Zsigmond Kemény became the chief organ of the movement, which was instrumental in keeping up hope and spirit in a Hungary fully incorporated into Austria and characterized by reprisals against political dissidents, thousands of treason trials, military governance, centralization, absolutism, censorship and direct control of Vienna over every aspect of public life.

Deák, Kemény and other leaders of the resistance carefully avoided any political agitation or criticism of the establishment (which was impossible anyway), and, strictly in the framework of civic organizations, concentrated on national issues of non-political nature, such as the use of the Hungarian language, development of the Hungarian economy, and protection of the legal standing of the Hungarian Academy of Sciences. Their followers, a considerable part of the intelligentsia and the landed gentry, either completely withdrew to private life or similarly limited themselves to non-political activities and, through various means of civil disobedience, refused to lend support or recognition to the authorities. Through their non-cooperation they managed to undermine the legitimacy and credibility of the institutions of the Austrian oppression, which came to be dependent on foreign (mostly Czech) civil servants and discredited collaborationists collectively known by the sobriquet Bach hussars. (Alexander Bach was Austrian minister of the interior at the time with the mission of transforming Hungarian public administration in such a way that all chance for commotion should be eradicated; the 1850s are therefore also referred to as Bach era in Hungarian historiography.)

Besides the absence of authentic personalities from state institutions, passive resistance was increasingly characterised by a widespread refusal to pay taxes, avoidance of military service and desertion.

== Political events of 1860-1861 ==
By the beginning of the decade, the worsening diplomatic isolation of Austria and events such as the 1859 Second Italian War of Independence undermined the Habsburg Empire militarily and financially, increasing Vienna's willingness to come to a compromise with the Hungarians. In 1859 Bach, the symbol of repression was dismissed; this, and the issuance of two successive "constitutions" for the Empire (the October Diploma and the February Patent, issued in 1860 and 1861, respectively) paved the way for Hungarian political leaders Ferenc Deák and József Eötvös to abandon their passive resistance and actively engage in politics again at the Diet convened by the Emperor on 2 April 1861.

However, the Hungarian Estates and the Viennese Court were unable to arrive at an agreement. The constitution proposed by Emperor Francis Joseph was seen as curbing Hungarian autonomy to an extent unacceptable by Hungarians, many of whom were still unwilling to give up their hopes of seceding Hungary from Austria entirely. The constitution was therefore rejected by the Diet, which was, in turn, dissolved by the Emperor with the threat of military violence.

== Road to the compromise ==
After the dissolution of the Diet, Deák resumed his policies of passive resistance; however, political fermentation started in 1860-61 proved unstoppable. Deák expressed his willingness to resume negotiations with Vienna in his famous 1865 article (the so-called Easter article), marking the end of the era of passive resistance.

The worsening politico-military situation of the Empire, especially the disastrous defeat in the Austro-Prussian War strengthened the support of reform in Vienna, while the diminishing moral and financial reserves of the Hungarian nobility also proved instrumental in bringing the majority of Hungarian leaders to acquiescing in their inability of achieving the complete independence of Hungary. The necessity of coming to a modus vivendi was therefore increasingly accepted by both parties; eventually, these tendencies and the interdependence of Austria and Hungary led to the Austro-Hungarian Compromise of 1867 and the creation of Austria-Hungary.

== The passive resistance as seen in Ireland ==
The period of passive resistance in Hungary from 1849 to 1867 attracted the interest of one prominent Irish nationalist, Arthur Griffith, who was a leading figure in the Sinn Féin movement from 1905 onwards, and who was later to be the Irish Foreign Secretary. He wrote a notable book, published in 1904, on Resurrection of Hungary: A Parallel for Ireland; and in a later edition of this book he reproduced his speech to the first annual convention of the National Council of Sinn Féin, in which he urged that Ireland follow the models of Hungary and Finland in casting off oppressive foreign rule through sustained passive resistance.
