= Johann Sylvan =

German theologian who was executed for his heretical Antitrinitarian beliefs

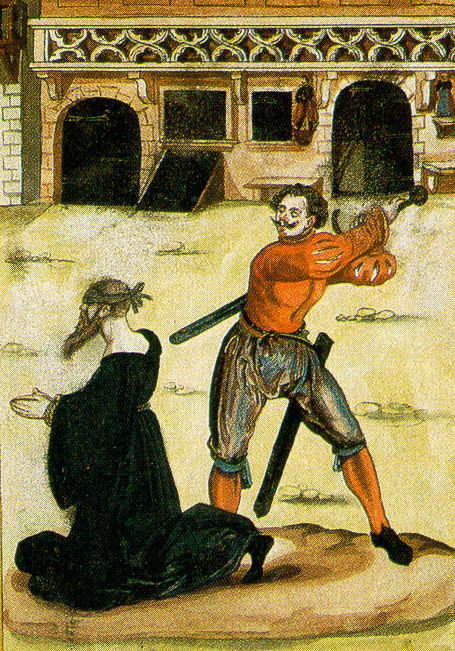
The Execution of Johann Sylvan

Johann Sylvan (died 23 December 1572) was a Reformed German theologian who was executed for his heretical Antitrinitarian beliefs.

== Origins and early career ==
Johann Sylvan probably came from the Etsch valley in the County of Tyrol. By 1555 he was employed as a preacher by the bishop of Würzburg. In 1559 he fled Würzburg and joined the Lutheran church in Tübingen. In 1560 he became a minister in Calw.

== Reformed pastor ==
In 1563 he entered the service of the Reformed Elector Frederick III of the Electorate of the Palatinate. During the same year he became pastor and church superintendent of Kaiserslautern. In 1566 Sylvan took part in a diplomatic mission to the Netherlands. In 1567 Sylvan became pastor in Ladenburg. The Palatinate would be rocked by controversy in 1568 on the question of church discipline, and Sylvan, along with his friends Thomas Erastus and Adam Neuser, emerged as leaders of the anti-disciplinist faction against Calvinists such as Caspar Olevianus.

== Antitrinitarian ==
Sylvan was asked by Jan Łasicki to refute a work by the Italian Antitrinitarian Giorgio Biandrata. The attempt to refute Biandrata’s treatise only convinced him of the veracity of Biandrata’s arguments, especially when the famed Hebrew scholar Immanuel Tremellius could offer him no support of the doctrine of the Trinity from the Old Testament.

Sylvan became part of an Antitrinitarian cell that included Adam Neuser, Matthias Vehe-Glirius, Jakob Suter and Johann Hasler. In 1570 John Sylvan wrote an Antitrinitarian manifesto entitled True Christian Confession of the Ancient Faith of the One True God and of Messiah Jesus of the True Christ, against the Three-Person Idol and the Two-Natured False Deity of the Antichrist.

Sylvan and Neuser attempted to migrate to Transylvania. Their letter to the Transylvanian prince was discovered and Sylvan – who unlike Adam Neuser was unable to flee – was arrested. Although Johann Sylvan later recanted his Unitarian faith, he was condemned and beheaded on the Heidelberg marketplace.

Elector Frederick’s own compromised confessional position, as an advocate of the theoretically illegal Reformed faith, created the context in which the Palatine court felt it had no other choice than to execute Sylvan and thus demonstrate the state’s theological orthodoxy.
