= Samuel Kohn =

Hungarian rabbi, historian (1841–1920)

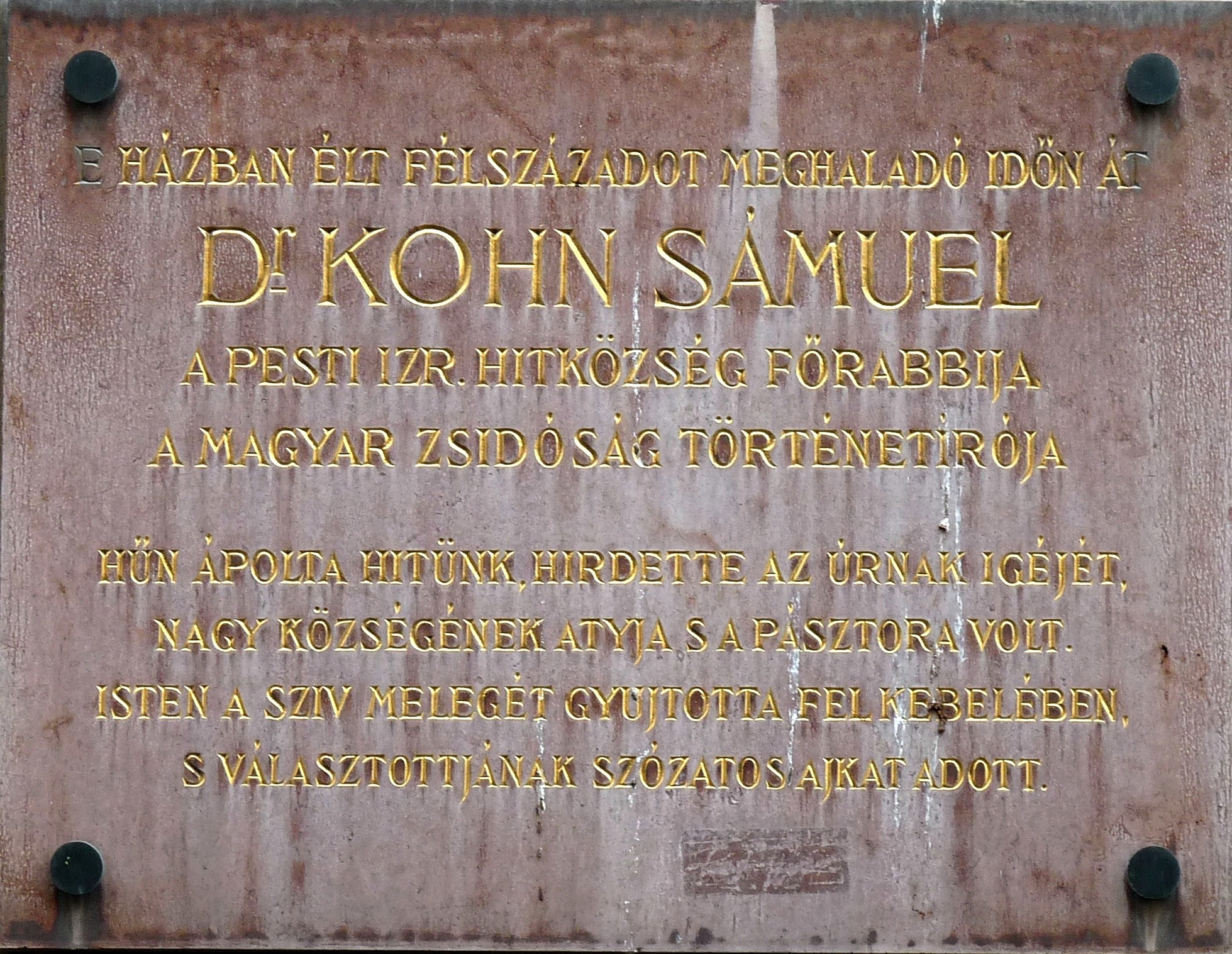

Samuel Kohn (1841–1920) was a Hungarian rabbi in Budapest from 1866 to 1905, time he was the Chief Rabbi of Budapest. He is remembered today as the author of A szombatosok, történetök, dogmatikájok és irodalmok ("The Sabbatarians: a complete history and dogmatic literature", Budapest 1889, German translation Die Sabbatarier in Siebenbürgen Leipzig 1894) concerning András Eőssi and other 16th Century Transylvanian Szekler Sabbatarians. Kohn's study coincided with Jewish interest in the sect, and in the following years most were absorbed into Judaism.

Kohn was a prominent champion of the pro-Magyarization program of Neolog Judaism and in order to bolster this program he argued for the mixed Khazar and Magyar ancestry of Hungarian Jews, as opposed to Israelite ancestry, during the 1880s.
