= Mihály Káthay =

Hungarian politician

Chancellor of Transylvania
- In office December 1604 – September 1606
- Monarch: Stephen Bocskay
- Preceded by: János Jacobinus
- Succeeded by: Vacant next office-holder: János Petki

Personal details
- Born: c. 1565
- Died: 12 January 1607 Kassa, Kingdom of Hungary (today: Košice, Slovakia)
- Spouse(s): Anna Drugeth; Margit Mágóchy

Mihály Káthay de Csekekáta (Kátay; c. 1565 – 12 January 1607) was a Hungarian soldier and noble in the Principality of Transylvania, who served as Chancellor of Transylvania from December 1604 to September 1606. He was imprisoned and executed on charges of murder of Prince Stephen Bocskay, the leader of the Bocskay's War of Independence.

== Life ==
=== Family ===
He was born into a lower noble family which originated from Csekekáta (today Nagykáta). His father was Ferenc Káthay, lieutenant of judge royal Gábor Perényi and later served in the Castle of Eger. He had a younger brother.

Mihály Káthay married twice: his first wife was Anna Drugeth de Homonna, and the second was Margit Mágóchy. Káthay had a daughter from one of his wives.

=== Career ===
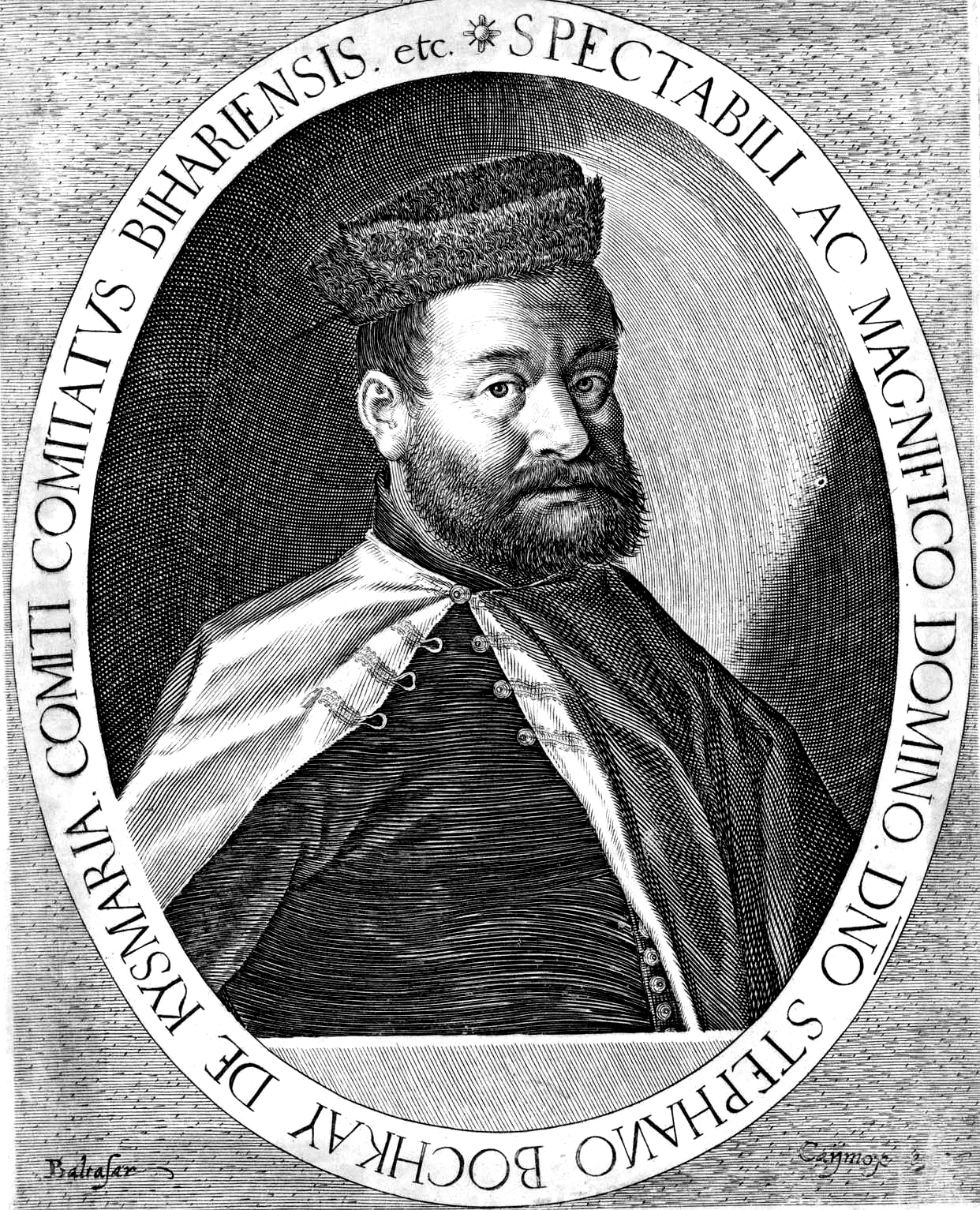
Prince Stephen Bocskay

He started a military career at his young age, he served besides Stephen Báthory even then. He fought in the Long War. He seriously wounded, along with judge royal Stephen Báthory de Ecsed in the Battle of Hatvan. In the summer of 1594 he moved to Transylvania to help to Prince Sigismund Báthory. He became "knight" of the prince in 1596.

He was appointed captain of Kálló in 1599. His work was hindered by shortage of money. He asked in several letters the Szepes Chamber to pay off the defenders' military pay. learning the refusal, "the soldiers very outraged", "so much that all they wanted to rebel, I found it hard to quiet them" – wrote Káthay to the Chamber in one of his letters dated 1 November 1599.

He had considerable wealth by his second marriage and had a close relationship with the most powerful landowners of Northern Hungary from that time. He joined to Stephen Bocskay in 1604 who named as his Chancellor. He had an important role in the preparation of the Treaty of Vienna in 1606. Because of that and his Roman Catholic religion, the Calvinist preachers from the court looked suspiciously to him.

=== Arrest and death ===
Káthay made contact with the Habsburgs and the Ottoman Empire. As a result, he was imprisoned in Kassa (today: Košice, Slovakia) by Bocskay in September 1606. Later, Bocskay, suffering from edema, thought wrongly that Káthay poisoned him. The prince died on 29 December 1606. After that Káthay was then hacked to bits by Bocskay's adherents in the town's marketplace.

Several mourning poems maintained about Bocskay's death, which also accuse and condemn Káthay.

== Sources ==
- Markó, László: A magyar állam főméltóságai Szent Istvántól napjainkig – Életrajzi Lexikon p. 111. (The High Officers of the Hungarian State from Saint Stephen to the Present Days – A Biographical Encyclopedia) (2nd edition); Helikon Kiadó Kft., 2006, Budapest; ISBN 963-547-085-1.
- Trócsányi, Zsolt: Erdély központi kormányzata 1540–1690. Budapest, Akadémiai Kiadó, 1980. ISBN 963 05 2327 2

Political offices
Preceded by János Jacobinus	Chancellor of Transylvania; 1604–1606	Succeeded by Vacant; Title next held by János Petki
