= Mikes family =

Hungarian noble family of Székely origin from the 16th century

House of Mikes
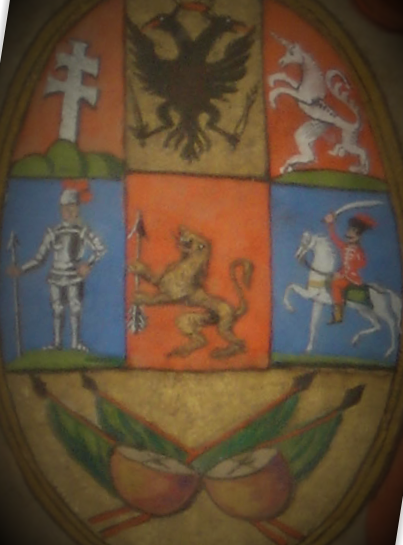
- Country: Kingdom of Hungary; Principality of Transylvania
- Founded: 15th century
- Founder: Miklós I
- Titles: Baron (1693); Count (1696)
- Cadet branches: Zágon branch

The House of Mikes de Zabola is a Hungarian noble family of Székely origin from the 16th century.

The family's historical presence dates back to the political affairs of the Middle Ages, notably linked to the National Assembly of Agyagfalva in 1506. Over time, members of the family consistently aligned with the Principality of Transylvania, serving as envoys (e.g., representing Transylvania in Venice), generals, and chancellors in various princely matters during the 16th and 17th centuries. By the early 17th century, Mihály MIKES became the commissioner of Háromszék, and the family actively participated in the freedom fight of II. Ferenc RÁKOCZI alongside other freedom fighters.

The modern developments on the Zabola Estate were initiated by Count Benedek MIKES (1819-1878) and further expanded by Count Ármin MIKES (1868-1944). The latter erected the so-called “New Castle” as an office building and guesthouse for visitors.

Exile, imprisonment, torture, and dispossession have been recurring themes across generations of the family. Two brothers from the (Catholic) Mikes family gained notoriety in Hungarian literature after their involvement in the 1634 kidnapping of the daughter of a prominent (Protestant) family, leading to the confiscation of their properties by the government (depicted in Zsigmond KEMÉNY's work "Özvegy és leánya" "The Widow and Her Daughter").

The darkest period began in 1949 when, on the night of March 2nd, Shrove Tuesday, noble families were forcibly evicted from the country within hours. Countess Katalin MIKES, then a young girl, was among those who had to hastily leave the castle amidst the chaos. Subsequent decades were marked by labor camps, forced relocation, limited educational opportunities, and constant threat of persecution. The family crypt behind the castle was demolished in the late 1950s.

Katalin MIKES was finally permitted to leave the country for Austria in 1960 to join her relatives. After the revolution in 1989, she returned to the Zabola Estate with her late husband Shuvendu Basu Roy Chowdhury of Ulpur and their sons to advocate for the restitution of their properties and the restoration of neglected and destroyed assets.

The restoration efforts are ongoing

== Notable members ==
- Mihály Mikes (politician) (d. 1662), Chancellor of Transylvania (1656–1660) was involved in the kidnapping of his brother's love, Sára TARNÓCZY de Királyfalva, in 1637. As a consequence, the brothers were sentenced to death in 1638, and their properties were confiscated. However, they later received amnesty and returned to Zabola. Mihály was also an envoy to Warsaw, seeking the Polish crown for George RÁKOCZI I, and served as a member of the Royal Court of Justice in 1652.
- Mihály Mikes (soldier) (d. 1721), created Baron (1693) then Count (1696), became kuruc after 1703. He was a member of the Transylvanian Gubernium.
- Count Benedek MIKES (1819-1878), was sentenced to death for leading an army against the Habsburg monarchy during the Revolution of 1848-49. He fled the country but returned to Zabola twelve years later via Bulgaria, Geneva, and Paris. Upon his return, he played a pivotal role in establishing glass mills and the well-known local spa town Tusnádfürdő.
- Kelemen Mikes (1820–1849), Honvéd general in the Hungarian Revolution of 1848. Along with his friend Count Gergely BETHLEN, formed a regiment to support the Revolution of 1848. He rose to the rank of Hussar colonel but tragically lost his life at the age of 29 during the Siege of Nagyszeben (Sibiu), struck by a cannonball fired by the Russian army in 1849.
- Count Ármin Mikes (1868-1944), industrialist, was married to Countess Klementina BETHLEN, sister of the long-time prime minister Count István BETHLEN.
- János Mikes (1876–1945), served as the Bishop of Szombathely/Steinamanger (1911–1936). He was a leading figure in the legitimist camp, a renowned patron of the arts, and a prominent public figure in the first half of the 19th century. He was also the first bishop to visit the pope in the Vatican by plane in 1911. László ALMÁSY (known as "The English Patient") served as his personal secretary before departing for Africa.

=== From the Zágon branch ===
- Kelemen Mikes (1690–1761), essayist, scribe of Francis II Rákóczi, Prince of Transylvania. Died in exile. Renowned for his "Letters from Turkey" and often referred to as the Hungarian Goethe.

== Manor Houses ==
Bodola

Nagydebrek

Marosujvár

Szászfenes

Sepsibükszad

Uzon

Zabola

Zágon

== See also ==
- List of titled noble families in the Kingdom of Hungary
