= János Bethlen =

Hungarian noble

Chancellor of Transylvania
- In office 2 June 1659 – 13 February 1678
- Monarchs: Ákos Barcsay; John Kemény; Michael I Apafi
- Preceded by: Mihály Mikes
- Succeeded by: Farkas Bethlen

Personal details
- Born: 1613 Kisbún, Principality of Transylvania (today: Țopa, Romania)
- Died: 13 February 1678 (aged 64-65) Nagyszeben, Principality of Transylvania (today: Sibiu, Romania)
- Spouse(s): Borbála Várady; Klára Fekete

János Bethlen de Bethlen (1613 – 13 February 1678) was a Hungarian noble in the Principality of Transylvania, who served as Chancellor of Transylvania from 1659 to 1678.

== Life ==
János was the only son of Farkas Bethlen, Ispán (Count; comes) of Küküllő County and Anna Kemény de Magyargyerőmonostor, sister of John Kemény, Prince of Transylvania. He had three sisters. His parents died during his youth, he grew up in the court of Ferenc Macskási. Under the influence of his stepfather, he converted to Calvinism from Unitarianism. His educator was Pál Keresztúri.

He studied for several years in the University of Frankfurt until September 1630 when returned to home. He married Borbála Várady (d. 1661) in 1637, they had two sons, including Miklós, future Chancellor of Transylvania, and two daughters. His second wife was Klára Fekete de Frics (since 1662), they had a son.

=== Political career ===
Bethlen was a member of the Royal Court of Justice from March 1648 to 1658. He served as Ispán of Torda County (1651–1656), Küküllő County (1656–1662; alongside Ferenc Pekry between 1658 and 1659) and Fehér County from September 1662 until his death.

He functioned as envoy of George II Rákóczi to the Kingdom of Poland in 1653. He participated in the failure campaign of Rákóczi against Poland in 1657. He was the military commander of the occupied Kraków. He was a member of the Royal Countil since 1658 until his death. The new prince Ákos Barcsay appointed Bethlen as Chancellor in 1659. He had a significant role in the election of John Kemény in 1660. However he became a supporter of Michael I Apafi after the Battle of Nagyszőlős (1662). He served as Captain General of Udvarhelyszék between June 1660 and 1667 (except the short period of Kemény's rule). He founded the Calvinist College in Székelyudvarhely (today: Odorheiu Secuiesc, Romania). He reinstated the Gabriel Bethlen College from Kolozsvár (today: Cluj-Napoca, Romania) to Nagyenyed (today: Aiud, Romania).

In 1676, he accused of having participated in the conspiracy of Pál Béldi, as a result he was deprived from his positions. The Chancellor rights were exercised by his distant relative Farkas Bethlen until the next year when János regained his office. However he completely lost his political influence.

== Works ==
- Rerum Transylvanicarum libri quator (Nagyszeben, 1663) and (Amsterdam, 1664). Translated into German by Johannes Tröster. The work confirmed the Turkish-friendly policy of Transylvania.

== Sources ==
- Markó, László: A magyar állam főméltóságai Szent Istvántól napjainkig – Életrajzi Lexikon p. 102. (The High Officers of the Hungarian State from Saint Stephen to the Present Days – A Biographical Encyclopedia) (2nd edition); Helikon Kiadó Kft., 2006, Budapest; ISBN 963-547-085-1.
- Trócsányi, Zsolt: Erdély központi kormányzata 1540–1690. Budapest, Akadémiai Kiadó, 1980. ISBN 963 05 2327 2

Political offices
Preceded by Mihály Mikes	Chancellor of Transylvania; 1659–1678	Succeeded by Farkas Bethlen
