= Farkas Bethlen =

Hungarian noble and chronicler

Chancellor of Transylvania
- In office February 1678 – 30 December 1679
- Monarch: Michael I Apafi
- Preceded by: János Bethlen
- Succeeded by: Vacant next office-holder: Mihály Teleki

Personal details
- Born: 1639 Bethlenszentmiklós, Principality of Transylvania (today: Sânmiclăus, Romania)
- Died: 30 December 1679 (aged 39-40) Bethlenszentmiklós, Principality of Transylvania (today: Sânmiclăuş, Romania)
- Spouse: Borbála Ostrosith

Farkas Bethlen de Bethlen (1639 – 30 December 1679) was a Hungarian noble and chronicler in the Principality of Transylvania, who served as Chancellor of Transylvania from 1678 to 1679.

== Life ==
Farkas was the son of Ferenc Bethlen, Ispán (Count; comes) of Fehér County, Marshal of George II Rákóczi, and Kata Kemény de Magyargyerőmonostor. He had three sisters and five brothers. He married Borbála Ostrosith.

He studied in the Unitarian Academy at Kolozsvár (today: Cluj-Napoca, Romania). After that his educator was Pál Keresztúri in the court of George II Rákóczi. He participated in the Prince's unsuccessful campaign against the Kingdom of Poland in 1657. In the next year Rákóczi commissioned him to negotiate with Habsburg Hungary in Pressburg and Vienna to organize an alliance against the Ottoman Empire which did not tolerate Rákóczi's foreign policy.

Farkas Bethlen served as Master of doorkeepers since March 1659. He also functioned as Ispán of Fehér County from 1661 until his death with a short break. After the death of Rákóczi he was a supporter of princes John Kemény and Michael I Apafi. He was a member of the Royal Council since 1664. He took part in the Battle of Nagyszőlős, where John Kemény was killed. He served as acting Chancellor between 1676 and 1677 when his distant relative János Bethlen was charged with conspiracy. Farkas became Chancellor in 1678 however he died suddenly in the next year. The position remained vacant after his death.

== Works ==
- Historia de rebus Transylvanicis (16 books; History of Transylvania between 1525 and 1609)

== Sources ==
- Markó, László: A magyar állam főméltóságai Szent Istvántól napjainkig – Életrajzi Lexikon p. 100. (The High Officers of the Hungarian State from Saint Stephen to the Present Days – A Biographical Encyclopedia) (2nd edition); Helikon Kiadó Kft., 2006, Budapest; ISBN 963-547-085-1.
- Trócsányi, Zsolt: Erdély központi kormányzata 1540–1690. Budapest, Akadémiai Kiadó, 1980. ISBN 963 05 2327 2

Political offices
| Preceded by János Bethlen | Chancellor of Transylvania; 1678–1679 | Succeeded by Vacant; Title next held by Mihály Teleki |
