= Ferenc Forgách (bishop of Várad) =

Hungarian Roman Catholic prelate

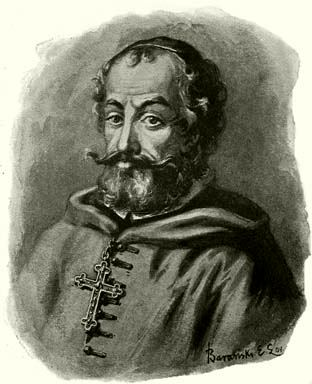
- Archdiocese: Esztergom
- Diocese: Várad (today: Oradea Mare)
- Installed: 1556
- Term ended: 1566
- Predecessor: Mátyás Zaberdi
- Successor: István Radeczy
- Other post: Canon of Eger

Personal details
- Born: c. 1530 Buda, Kingdom of Hungary
- Died: 19 January 1577 Padua
- Denomination: Catholic

Baron Ferenc Forgách de Ghymes et Gács (c. 1530 – 19 January 1577) was a Hungarian prelate of the Roman Catholic Church, who served as bishop of Várad (today: Oradea Mare) and Chancellor of Transylvania between 1571 and 1575. Nicolaus Olahus became his mentor and patron, funding his studies in Padua and encouraging him to pursue a career in the Church.

His nephews were, among others, Palatine Zsigmond Forgách and Archbishop of Esztergom Ferenc Forgách.

== Bibliography ==
- Markó, László: A magyar állam főméltóságai Szent Istvántól napjainkig - Életrajzi Lexikon p. 225. (The High Officers of the Hungarian State from Saint Stephen to the Present Days - A Biographical Encyclopedia) (2nd edition); Helikon Kiadó Kft., 2006, Budapest; ISBN 963-547-085-1.
- Szabó de Bártfa, László: A Hunt-Pázmán nemzetségbeli Forgách család története History of the Forgách family from the kindred of Hont-Pázmány; 1910, Esztergom.

Catholic Church titles
Preceded by Mátyás Zaberdi	Bishop of Várad; 1556–1566	Succeeded by István Radeczy
Political offices
Preceded by Mihály Csáky	Chancellor of Transylvania; 1571–1575	Succeeded by Imre Sulyok
