= Mihály Csáky =

Hungarian noble (died 1572)

Chancellor of Transylvania
- In office 1556–1571
- Monarch: John Sigismund Zápolya
- Preceded by: office established
- Succeeded by: Ferenc Forgách

Personal details
- Born: c. 1492
- Died: May 1572 Gyulafehérvár, Principality of Transylvania (today: Alba Iulia, Romania)

Mihály Csáky de Mihály (Csáki; c. 1492 – May 1572) was a Hungarian noble in the Principality of Transylvania, who served as the first Chancellor of Transylvania from 1556 to 1571.

== Early career ==
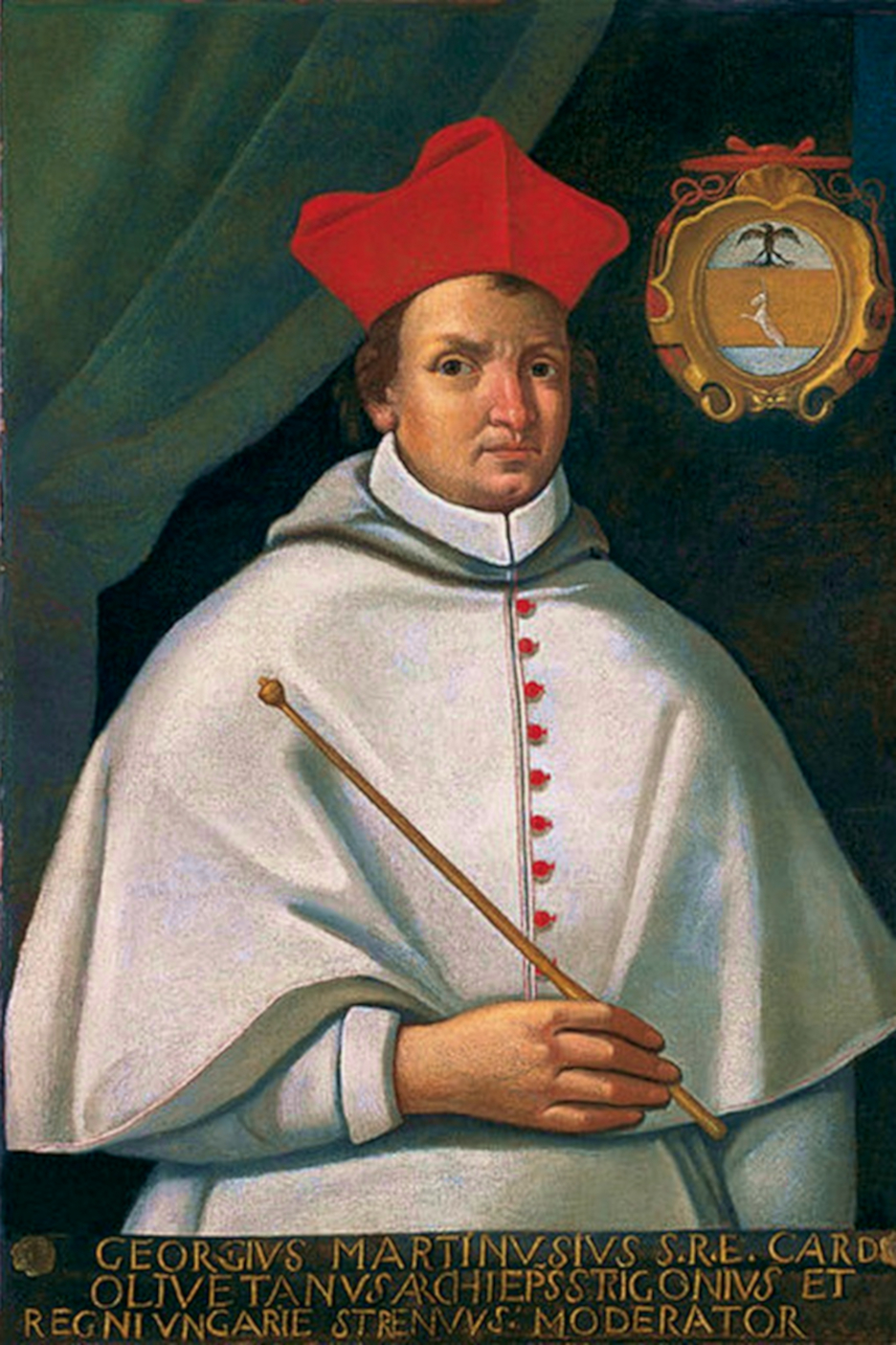
Csáky's rival, George Martinuzzi (died 1551)

He was born into a lower noble family around 1492. His father, István Csáky (Csáki) participated in the Diet of 1505 as envoy of Sopron County. Mihály studied at the University of Kraków, with the subsidization of his distant relative, Bishop of Transylvania János Gosztonyi between 1521 and 1525. His fellow students were, including, Matthias Dévay, Márton Kálmáncsehi and János Károlyi. After that he chose the ecclesiastical career and served in, according to his biographer, Zsigmond Jakó, John Sigismund Zápolya's royal court. He became canon of Gyulafehérvár (today: Alba Iulia, Romania) in 1539. He served as deputy vice bishop and dean of Kraszna County since 1543, then episcopal vicar from 1545. He was the dean of Hunyad County in 1549. During that time, he befriended Antal Verancsics (Croatian: Antun Vrančić). Csáky succeeded him in the position of secretary of Queen Isabella Jagiellon in 1549.

Mihály Csáky was a member of the royal council of twelve members between 1548 and 1551 which was attached to George Martinuzzi (Hungarian: Fráter György). The Diet of Torda (today: Turda, Romania) in 1548 established the council to limit the power of the Frater. Martinuzzi was hostile to him, because Csáky was a partisan of Isabella, on the other hand the councilor gradually tilted towards, in spite of his former position at the Roman Catholic Church, the Lutheran doctrine. Chronicler Mathias Miles recorded that Martinuzzi applied severe punishment against Mihály Csáky, who violated the fasting on Friday: he tied rabbit and chicken to Csáky's naked body and released the hounds. Besides his office of councilor he served as secretary for the prince between 1549 and 1550. He was the educator of the child John Sigismund too. After the Treaty of Nyírbátor, adherents of the queen and Martinuzzi faced each other. In this spirit, the bishop tried to arrest Csáky on charges of abuse of power. Later Martinuzzi also raised murder of Csáky in 1550.

== Chancellor of Transylvania ==
=== Organization of the state structure ===
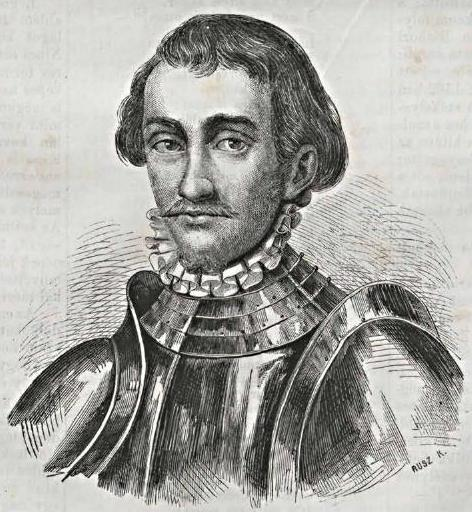
John Sigismund, protegee of Csáky

In 1551, Mihály Csáky traveled to the Kingdom of Poland as a member of the queen's escort. Meanwhile, Martinuzzi was murdered in December 1551. Ferdinand I tried to persuade Csáky to join to his court, but without any success. When Isabella and his son, John Sigismund returned to home in 1556, Csáky began to create the Transylvanian Chancellery, which had been advocated formerly by the Diet of Kolozsvár (today: Cluj-Napoca, Romania) in 1550. Acorrding to his plans, the Chancellery consisted of two parts: the cancellaria maior ("Greater Chancellery") dealt with the affairs of the foreign and internal government under the authority of the Chancellor, while the cancellaria minor ("Lesser Chancellery"), headed by two masters of judgement, arranged the judicial cases of Transylvania and the Partium.

After the death of Queen Isabella (1559), Csáky maintained his position of chancellor and councilor besides John Sigismund. He became the most powerful magnate of Transylvania. He did his work mostly remaining in the background, he controlled the diplomacy, the jurisdiction through the ecclesiastical affairs. Sometimes he was also responsible for the finances of the principality, when the office of master of the treasury fell vacant. His successor, Ferenc Forgách described him as "almighty'. Csáky did not participating in armed conflicts, but he had also influence over military affairs. After the betrayal of Menyhért Balassa, Csáky was the one who precluded more serious consequences with a good organization.

=== Ecclesiastical policy ===
He had a prominent role in the establishing of the Evangelical-Lutheran Church in Hungary. He supported Gáspár Heltai's efforts to translation into Hungarian language of the Bible with large amount of money. Csáky was a dedicated follower of the Lutheranism in the second phase of his life, but is not known precisely when he converted to Lutheranism from Roman Catholicism. According to some foreign envoys, he assumed office in the Lutheran Church too.

Csáky became a follower of the Antitrinitarian (or Unitarian) doctrines, after the Disputes of 1568 in Gyulafehérvár. Some chronicles attributed major role to him that John Sigismund converted to Unitarianism, but that fact is disputed.

== Aftermath and legacy ==
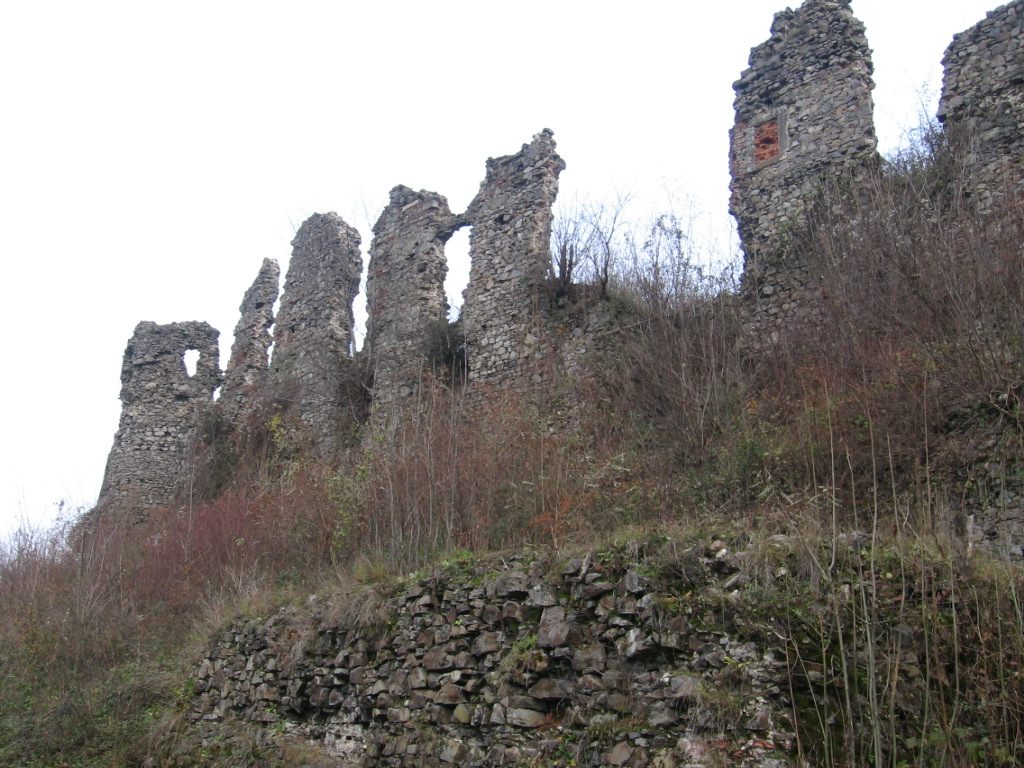
Ruins of Huszt Castle, owned by Csáky for a short time

John Sigismund died suddenly in 1571, four days after the ratification of the Treaty of Speyer. After the election of voivode Stephen Báthory (who later became Prince of Transylvania and King of Poland), Mihály Csáky lost his office and all of his political influence.

According to his contemporaries, he was a very stingy and violent man. He collected a huge fortune towards the end of his life: he acquired the estates of the extinct Czibak family in Bihar County and the Huszt Castle. His property was inherited by his nephews.

Mihály Csáky died in May 1572 at Gyulafehérvár, the capital of the Principality of Transylvania.

== Sources ==
- Csáki Mihály (1492–1572) erdélyi kancellár származásáról. In Jakó, Zsigmond: Társadalom, egyház, művelődés: Tanulmányok Erdély történelméhez. Budapest: Magyar Egyháztörténeti Enciklopédia Munkaközösség (METEM). 1997. pp. 91–96.
- Markó, László: A magyar állam főméltóságai Szent Istvántól napjainkig - Életrajzi Lexikon p. 104. (The High Officers of the Hungarian State from Saint Stephen to the Present Days - A Biographical Encyclopedia) (2nd edition); Helikon Kiadó Kft., 2006, Budapest; ISBN 963-547-085-1.
- Trócsányi, Zsolt: Erdély központi kormányzata 1540–1690. Budapest, Akadémiai Kiadó, 1980. ISBN 963 05 2327 2

Political offices
Preceded by First creation	Chancellor of Transylvania; 1556–1571	Succeeded by Ferenc Forgách
