= Johann Hasler =

Swiss theologian and physician

Johann Hasler (born 1548, died after 1602), also known as Haslerus, was a 16th-century Swiss theologian and physician. He is known for his association with a group of antitrinitarians including Johann Sylvan and Adam Neuser and for developing Galen's concept of heat and cold into the idea of a scale of temperature.

== Biography ==
Johann Hasler was born in December 1548 at Oberdiessbach in the canton of Bern. After attending the municipal school he studied at the University of Basel (1565–1568), and then the University of Heidelberg where he arrived in the Summer of 1568. While in Heidelberg he was in contact with Thomas Erastus and Johann Sylvan. His assistance to Sylvan, including acting as a courier and transcribing manuscripts led to his arrest and imprisonment in 1570 on suspicion of complicity. As it was judged that he was acting in ignorance, he was recalled to Bern, where he presented a written confession and received a caution. Sylvan was later executed for heresy.

Hasler continued his studies in Lausanne and Leipzig, where he matriculated in 1571. During his time in Leipzig, there were reports that he had travelled to Poland with a group of students. This led to suspicion that he was planning to defect to Transylvania where a number of radicals were based. However he returned to Leipzig, and then declared his intention of changing from theology to medicine. He transferred to the University of Strasbourg in the summer of 1574. While in Strasbourg, Hasler produced his first published work Aphorismi Thetici Aristotelei, a thesis which attempted a synthesis between philosophy and theology, reason and revelation. Although he received his degree shortly afterward, doubts were expressed about the theological views expressed in the work. Hasler responded in writing defending his work, which resulted in him being interrogated in prison, in August 1575, though part of his offence was publishing the work without the permission of the censor. Hasler agreed to retract any suggestion that scriptures were not the sole source of revelation and was released from prison. After this he was required to return to Bern.

During the next few years he spent time in Freiburg, where he received his medical doctorate, Lithuania as a family tutor, and Augsburg, where his two next important works De Logistica Medica, and Tabula aphoristica were published in 1578. In 1582 he returned to Bern, where he was appointed municipal doctor (Stadtarzt). Although holding a medical degree, he seems to have had little experience in practical medicine, and he transferred to a position in the university. He married in Bern, and had at least four children between 1583 and 1590. During this period he produced several works on practical astrology. He left Bern in 1593, after a conflict within the university, probably returning to Lithuania. The circumstances and date of his death are unknown.

== Theology and philosophy ==
Hasler could clearly be a difficult and disputatious man. A letter from Thomas Erastus in 1574 notes that "his arrogance and ambition gave grounds for concern" and that he was "capable of defending whichever side of an argument pleased him". But although he came under suspicion on several occasions, there was never sufficient evidence of serious deviations from the orthodoxy of the Lutheran establishment in Bern, and he generally retained the support of the city fathers, who had sponsored his studies.

The most important dispute was over the Aphorismi in 1574–1575, which dealt with arguments for natural knowledge of God (including the doctrine of the Trinity) based on Aristotle's Metaphysics. He argued that "Aristotle's comments on the eternity of the world were really a deduction from the idea of the Prime Mover as eternal causality. On this basis it was possible to outline the attributes of God, all of which could be derived from the simple and undivided nature of the divine essence." He was criticised for claiming that philosophy should be used to moderate religion, which implied that the divine revelation in the scriptures was not a sufficient basis for theology. This could be seen as an attack on the authority of the church, and he was forced to recant. His decision to change his field to medicine pre-dated this dispute, but it led him into generally safer territory.

== Medicine and science ==
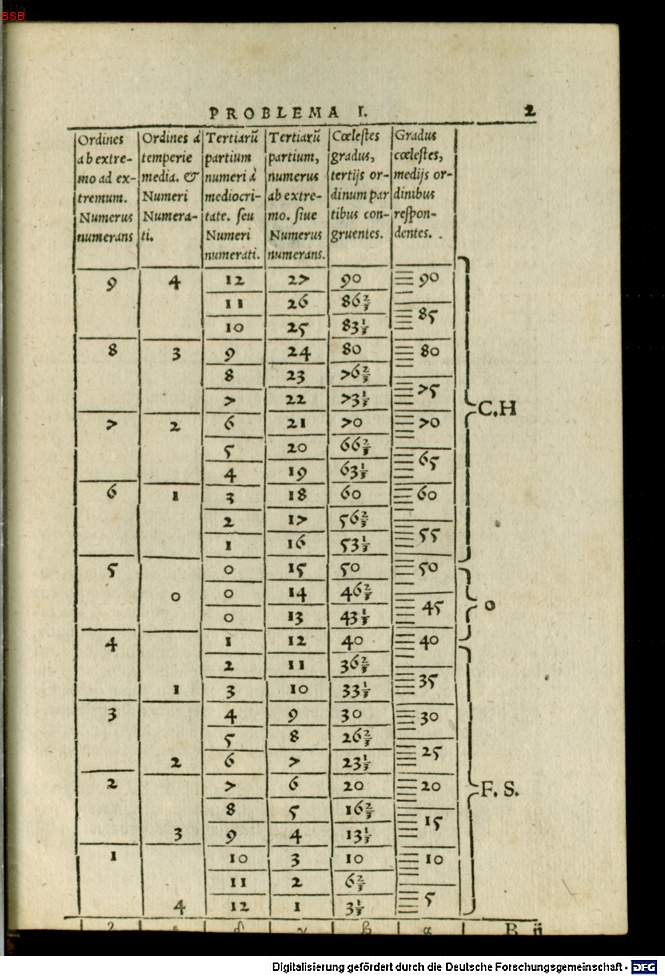
Hasler's diagram of temperature scales, from De Logistica Medica, published in 1578. Key: C = Calidum (Hot); F = Frigidum (Cold); H = Humidum (Moist); S = Siccum (Dry)

Galen's theory of medicine used the idea of the four humours (earth, air, fire, and water) characterised by four qualities (moist, dry, warm, cold), linked as earth: dry, cold; air: moist, warm; fire: dry, warm; water: moist, cold. Hasler followed Galen in considering temperament (cf temperature) as an important characteristic of both persons and medicines. Galen had experimented with mixing boiling water and ice to establish a "neutral" temperature, and posited four degrees of cold and four degrees of warmth on either side of this neutral zero point. This formulation still envisaged warm and cold as distinct, opposed entities. Hasler saw that the nine points of Galen's model could be united into a single scale from 1 (coldest) to 9 (hottest).

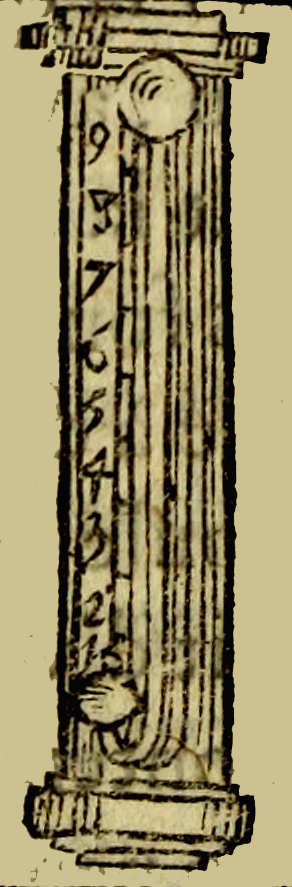
A double bulb (Dutch) thermometer with 1-9 temperature scale. From Leurechon's Recreation mathematique

A thermometer with a 1–9 scale was described in 1624.

He also aligned his 1–9 temperature scale with latitude, with one end of the scale corresponding to the hot equator, the other end to the cold arctic, as shown in the reproduction on the right. The diagram shows that a similar scaling applies to humidity. It appears that Hasler envisaged the underlying scales as continuous - this is implied both by the mapping to latitude, and by the presentation of more detailed, sub-divided versions of the scales.

Hasler's works also included comprehensive catalogues of medical substances categorised according to their properties of temperature and humidity, and astrological calendars.

== Works by Johann Hasler ==
- Aphorismi Thetici Aristotelei (Strasbourg. 1575).
- De Logistica Medica problematis novem (Augsburg, 1578).
- Tabula aphoristica (Augsburg, 1578).
- Fröhliche Practick auff das 1588 Jar (Cluj, 1588).
- Astrologische Practica auff das 1590 Jar (Basel, 1590).
- Paradoxus annorum mundi a creatione usque ad Jesum Chrlstum (Vilnius, 1596).
- De fuga et praeclusione pestilentiae (Vilnius, 1602).
- Declaratio in Aphorismis Theticis Aristoteleis, Archives du Chapitre Saint-Thomas, Strasbourg 354/38, 245–395.
- Duae tabulae thesium astrologicarum, Stadtbibliothek Bern, MS Inc. V. 174.
- De sacrosancta trinitae confessio apologetica. Archives du Chapitre Saint-Thomas, Strasbourg 354/48, 419–422.
