= Imre Sulyok =

Chancellor of Transylvania
- In office 1576 – 25 January 1578
- Monarch: Stephen Báthory
- Preceded by: Ferenc Forgách
- Succeeded by: Márton Berzeviczy; Farkas Kovacsóczy

Personal details
- Died: January 25, 1578
- Spouse: Borbála Keresztúry

Imre Sulyok de Lekcse et Alsószopor (? – 25 January 1578) was a Hungarian politician in the Principality of Transylvania, who served as Chancellor of Transylvania from 1576 until his death.

== Biography ==
Sulyok was born into a Sulyok gens (clan) of Szatmár County. His parents were István Sulyok and Klára Kende. He married Borbála Keresztúry, whom he had a son and a daughter. He studied at the University of Wittenberg between 1562 and 1563.

He served as a clerk for voivode Christopher Báthory's Chancellery in 1567. He functioned as Master of Judgement from 1572 to 1574. Prince Stephen Báthory sent Sulyok as his envoy to Vienna in the court of King Maximilian to thank the monarch's intervention in the promoting peace between the Prince and Gáspár Bekes. Sulyok went to Warsaw in 1575 and visited the Sejm to urge them to offer the Polish throne for Prince Báthory. He participated in the reorganizing of the place of authentication of the Kolozsmonostor Abbey in that same year.

Imre Sulyok was appointed Chancellor of Transylvania in the next year, replacing Ferenc Forgách, when Stephen Báthory became King of Poland and his younger brother, Christopher ruled the county as voivode. Sulyok had estates in Doboka County. He died in office on 25 January 1578. He was succeeded by Farkas Kovacsóczy (for voivode Christopher in Transylvania) and Márton Berzeviczy (for Stephen Báthory in Poland).

Political offices
Preceded by Ferenc Forgách	Chancellor of Transylvania; 1576–1578	Succeeded by Márton Berzeviczy; Farkas Kovacsóczy
