= Mihály Mikes (politician) =

Hungarian statesman (1613 – 1662)

Chancellor of Transylvania
- In office 1656–1660
- Monarch: George II Rákóczi
- Preceded by: Vacant last office-holder: István Kovacsóczy
- Succeeded by: János Bethlen

Personal details
- Died: 1662
- Spouse: Borbála Paczolai

Mihály Mikes de Zabola (? – 1662) was a Hungarian noble in the Principality of Transylvania, who served as Chancellor of Transylvania from 1656 to 1660.

== Biography ==
He was born into a Transylvanian aristocrat family as one of the five children of Zsigmond Mikes, a member of the Transylvanian Royal Council and Borbála Imecs. He married Borbála Paczolai, they had no children.

In his youth at November 1637, he tried to abduct his love Sára Tarnóczy de Királyfalva, with the help of his brothers, János and Pál and their servants, however they were caught in the act. As a result the Mikes brothers were sentenced to death and confiscation of property in 1638, but they fled to Moldavia, where served voivode Vasile Lupu. In the next year George I Rákóczi gave amnesty to him and returned to home.

Mikes functioned as commander of the Transylvanian artillery in 1644, then served as envoy to Warsaw besides Ferenc Bethlen in 1647 to ask the Polish throne for George I Rákóczi. After that he served in the Cavalry of the Court. He was appointed a member of the Royal Court of Justice in February 1652.

The new Prince of Transylvania, George II Rákóczi nominated him to the head of the Chancellery in 1656. He was also a member of the Royal Council since January 1658. He participated in the Second Northern War as commander of the Transylvanian troops which helped the Cossacks against the Polish Army.

The Ottoman Empire did not tolerate its vassal the Principality of Transylvania's autonomous foreign policy, therefore started a punitive campaign against Rákóczi. In 1658, Mikes unsuccessfully defended the line of Buzău River against the Ottoman-Tatar-Moldavian-Wallachian united army. Ákos Barcsay marched into Gyulafehérvár (today: Alba Iulia, Romania) and expelled, among others, Mikes from Transylvania on 24 May 1659. The anti-Prince also appointed a new Chancellor in the person of János Bethlen. However Mikes held the office too in the areas dominated by Rákóczi until the death of his lord in 1660.

== Legacy ==
Zsigmond Kemény depicted Mikes' abduction attempt in the novel of Özvegy és leánya ("The Widow and her Daughter").

== Sources ==
- Markó, László: A magyar állam főméltóságai Szent Istvántól napjainkig – Életrajzi Lexikon p. 115. (The High Officers of the Hungarian State from Saint Stephen to the Present Days – A Biographical Encyclopedia) (2nd edition); Helikon Kiadó Kft., 2006, Budapest; ISBN 963-547-085-1.
- Trócsányi, Zsolt: Erdély központi kormányzata 1540–1690. Budapest, Akadémiai Kiadó, 1980. ISBN 963 05 2327 2

Political offices
Preceded by Vacant; Title last held by István Kovacsóczy	Chancellor of Transylvania; 1656–1660	Succeeded by János Bethlen
