= István Kovacsóczy =

Hungarian politician (died 1634)

Chancellor of Transylvania
- In office 1622–1634
- Monarchs: Gabriel Bethlen; Catherine of Brandenburg; Stephen Bethlen; George I Rákóczi
- Preceded by: Vacant last office-holder: Simon Péchi
- Succeeded by: Vacant next office-holder: Mihály Mikes

Personal details
- Died: October 1634
- Spouse: Zsófia Telegdi

István Kovacsóczy de Körtvélyfa (? – October 1634) was a Hungarian noble in the Principality of Transylvania, who served as Chancellor of Transylvania from 1622 to 1634. His father Farkas Kovacsóczy, also a Chancellor (1578–1594), was executed by Sigismund Báthory in 1594.

== Biography ==
His mother was his father's first wife Kata Farkas de Harina. He had two brothers and two sisters. He married Zsófia Telegdi (died 1637). They had no children. During his early career, he served as familiar of Prince Gabriel Bethlen. He functioned as Secretary in the Transylvanian Chancellery between 1616 and 1622. After the arrest of Simon Péchi in 1621, he dealt with the daily internal political issues when the seat of the Chancellor was vacant. Finally, he was appointed Chancellor in 1622. He held the office until his death, he served under four Princes of Transylvania. He was also a member of the Royal Council.

He was the signatory of the Treaty of Vienna (1624) in the name of the Prince, which renewed the Peace of Nikolsburg. He also served as Captain General of Háromszék (since 1625) and as Ispán (Count; comes) of Torda County (since 1627) until his death. He was the last male member of the Kovacsóczy de Körtvélyfa family.

== Sources ==
- Markó, László: A magyar állam főméltóságai Szent Istvántól napjainkig – Életrajzi Lexikon pp. 113-114. (The High Officers of the Hungarian State from Saint Stephen to the Present Days – A Biographical Encyclopedia) (2nd edition); Helikon Kiadó Kft., 2006, Budapest; ISBN 963-547-085-1.
- Trócsányi, Zsolt: Erdély központi kormányzata 1540–1690. Budapest, Akadémiai Kiadó, 1980. ISBN 963 05 2327 2

Political offices
Preceded by Vacant; Title last held by Simon Péchi	Chancellor of Transylvania; 1622–1634	Succeeded by Vacant; Title next held by Mihály Mikes
