= Adam Neuser =

German Protestant pastor (1530–1576)

- Born: 1530; Gunzenhausen
- Died: 1576 (aged 45–46); Constantinople, Ottoman Empire
- Religion: Protestant Christianity (Note: Lutheranism, then Calvinism) (formerly); Sunni Islam
- Theological work
- Tradition or movement: Antitrinitarianism

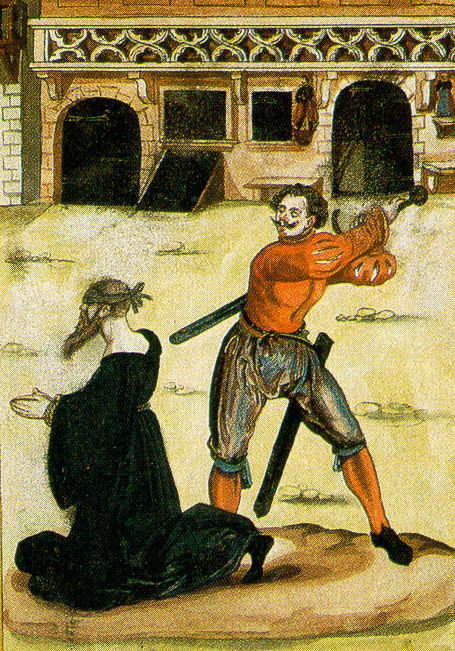
The execution of Neuser's associate Johann Sylvan.

Adam Neuser (c. 1530 – 12 October 1576) was a Protestant pastor of Heidelberg who held Antitrinitarian views and eventually converted to Islam.

== Biography ==
=== Early life ===
Neuser was born in Gunzenhausen and was a popular pastor and theologian in Heidelberg in the 1560s, serving at the Peterskirche and later the Heiliggeistkirche. During the controversy over church discipline that developed in the late 1560s, Neuser became a leading member of the Antidisciplinist, and thus anti-Calvinist, faction led by Thomas Erastus. His disaffection with the ecclesiastical regime perhaps played some role in his doubts concerning orthodox Christian dogma.

=== Antitrinitarian views ===
He wrote letters sternly attacking the doctrine of the trinity. He wrote to the Ottoman Sultan assuring Sultan that he would receive support in Germany if his conquests push him that far. Neuser along with another Antitrinitarian, Johann Sylvan, sought to dialog with the Turks. In an unsent letter, he argued that Christianity was corrupt, that Islam was better, and therefore the Sultan should take his army and conquer Europe.

Neuser was accused of denying divinity to Jesus Christ and was consequently imprisoned. His associate, Johann Sylvan, was tortured and beheaded. Neuser confessed but managed to break out of prison. He later converted to Islam and traveled to Istanbul where he served the Ottoman Sultan. When anti-Trinitarian visitors came to Istanbul, he attempted to convert them to the Islamic faith. Neuser also continued to research Christian sources that would refute the Trinity. He read the critiques of Christianity by Muhammad bin Abdullah, a Hungarian who had converted from Christianity to Islam, and recommended them to his friends.

His letter to the Ottoman Sultan is included in "Antiquities Palatine" which is now in the Archives at Heidelberg:

"I, Adam Neuser, a Christian born in Germany and advanced to the dignity of Preacher to the people in Heidelberg, a city where the most learned men at this day in Germany are to be found, do fly for refuge to your Majesty with a profound submission conjuring you for the love of God and your Prophet, on whom be the peace of God, to receive me into the number of your subjects and those of your people that believe in God.

For by the grace of the Omnipotent God, I see, I know, and I believe with my whole heart that your Doctrine and your Religion are pure, clear, and acceptable to God. I am firmly persuaded that my Retreat from among the idolatrous Christians will engage many persons of Consideration to embrace your Belief and your Religion, especially since many of the most learned and most considerable amongst them are herein of the same sentiments with me as I shall inform your Majesty by word of mouth.

As to what concerns myself I am certainly one of those of whom it is said in the thirteenth chapter of the Al Coran: The Christians show us more good will than the Jews; and when their Priests and Bishops, provided they are not imprudent and opinionated, understand the commandments which the Prophet of God gave, and thereby acknowledge the truth, they say with tears in their eyes, O God! We hope from our Hearts that since we believe the same things that the good people do, Thou wilt also make us enter into the communion: For why should not we believe in God and in Him who is manifested to us by the Truth?

Certainly, O Emperor! I am one of those that read the Al Coran with joy. I am one of those that desire to be of our People and I give testimony before God that the Doctrine of your Prophet, upon whom be the peace of God, is of undoubted Truth. For this reason I most humbly supplicate your Majesty for the love of God and of your Prophet to be graciously pleased to hear me and know after what manner the God of Mercy hath revealed this Truth to me.

But first of all your Majesty ought to be entirely persuaded that I have not recourse to your protection as some Christians are accustomed, who because of their crimes, thefts, murders, or adulteries, cannot live with safety among the people of their own Religion. For I had resolved above a year ago to fly for Refuge to you, and was advanced in my way as far as Presburg but not understanding the Hungarian language I could go no further and against my will was constrained to return to my country which I should not have ventured to do if I had fled for any crime. Besides nothing constrains me to embrace your Religion, for who could force me to it being unknown to our people, and at so great a distance from them?

So your Majesty ought not to place me in the number of those Christians who being conquered and made prisoners by your subjects embrace your Religion but not with good will and who so soon as they find occasion run away and renounce the true faith. Wherefore I again supplicate your Majesty to lend attention to what I am going to say and to be informed of the true course of my retreat to your Dominion.

Being promoted to the dignity of Preacher in the famous University of Heidelberg by the Elector Palatine who next to the Emperor is the most powerful prince in Germany, I began to weigh maturely within myself the divers dissensions and divisions of our Christian religion: for so many persons as there are amongst us there are so many opinions and sentiments. I began with abstracting from all the Doctors and Interpreters of the Scriptures who have wrote and taught since the days of the Prophet Jesus Christ. I tied myself only to the commandments of Moses and to the Gospel. Then I called upon God inwardly with a most religious application and prayed Him to show me the right way that I may not be in the danger to mislead myself and my hearers.

Then it pleased God to reveal to me the 'Articles of the Invocation of the One Only God', upon which Article I composed a book in which I prove that the Doctrine of Jesus Christ did not consist in asserting that he was himself a God as the Christians falsely allege: but that there is only One God who has no son consubstantial with Him. I dedicated this book to your Majesty and I am very sure that the most able men amongst the Christians are not capable of refuting it. And wherefore indeed should I associate to God another god like unto Him? Moses had forbid it and Jesus Christ never taught it.

Afterwards fortifying myself from day to day by the grace of God, and understanding that the Christians abuse all the benefits of Jesus Christ as formerly the Jews abused the brazen serpent ... I concluded that nothing pure is to be found amongst the Christians and that all they have is falsified. For they have perverted by their false interpretations almost all the writing of Moses and the Gospel which I have shown in a book wrote with my own hand and which I shall present to your Majesty.

When I say that the Christians have falsified and corrupted the commandments of Moses and the Gospel I mean only the words and the sense. For the doctrine of Moses, of Jesus and of Mahomet agree in everything and are not contrary to anything ... the Al Coran gives a very advantageous testimony to Moses and Jesus Christ. But it insists principally upon the Christians corrupting the commandments of Moses and the Gospel of Jesus Christ by their false interpretations. Indeed if the Word of God was faithfully interpreted there would be no difference amongst the Jews, Christians and Turks. Thus what the Al Coran so often repeats is true. The doctrine of Mahomet destroys all the false interpretations of the Scriptures and teaches the true sense of the Word of God ...

After that by the grace of God I understood there was but One only God, that I had observed that the doctrine of Jesus Christ was not taught as it ought to have been, that all the ceremonies of the Christians were very much different from their first institutions. I began to think I was the only man of my opinion in the World. I had not seen Al Coran and among us Christians there was care taken to spread in all parts such infamous and scandalous reports against everything that concerns the doctrines of Mahomet that the poor people who are made to believe things as so many truths are seized with horror and run out of themselves at the very name of Al Coran.

Nevertheless by the effect of Divine Providence that book fell into my hands for which I give thanks to God. To God I say Who knows that in my prayers I invoke Him for your Majesty and for all those that belong to you. I sought all effects of ways to impart the knowledge of these truths to my Auditors and in case they would not receive this doctrine I resolved to ask leave of the Electors to abandon my charge and retire to you.

I began to attack by way of dispute in all the churches and in the schools some points of our doctrine and obtained what I wished: For I brought the matter to such a point that it was known to all the States of the Empire and I drew several learned men to my side. The Elector (fearing an invasion from the Emperor Maximillian) ... deposed me ..."

== See also ==
- Matthias Vehe
