= Pesti Napló =

- Founded: March 1850
- Ceased publication: October 1939
- Language: Hungarian
- Headquarters: Budapest
- OCLC number: 751765505

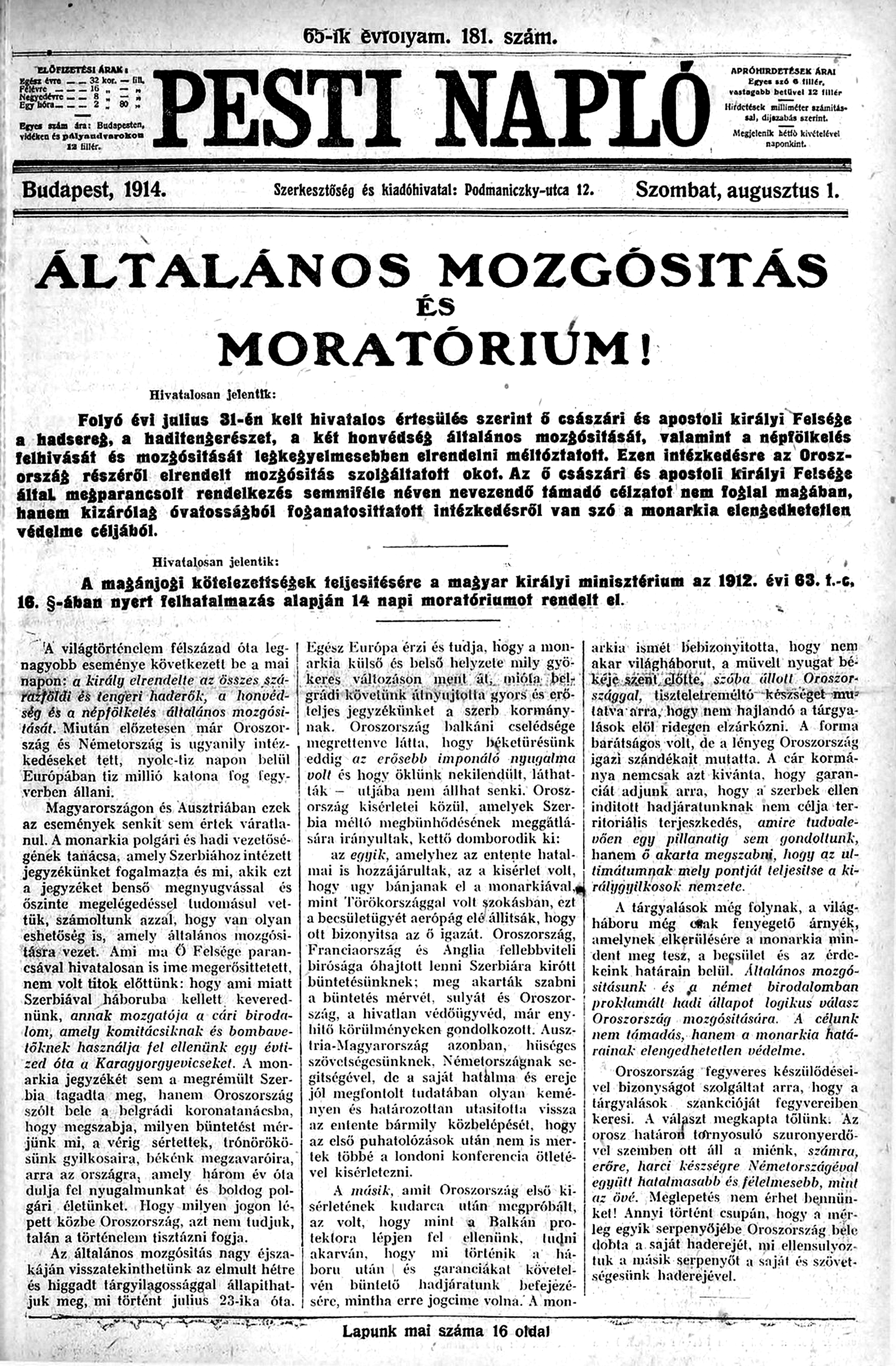
A 1914 edition of the paper

Pesti Napló (Hungarian pronunciation: [ˈpɛʃti ˈnɒploː]) was a Hungarian newspaper published from March 1850 to October 1939. The paper was based in Budapest, Hungary.

The Hungarian author Zsigmond Kemény was among the regular contributors to another paper, Pesti Hírlap. He became the editor of Pesti Napló in 1855.
