= Mihály Mikes (soldier) =

Hungarian landowner (died 1721)

Count Mihály Mikes de Zabola (? – 6 January 1721, in Csesztve) was a Hungarian landowner and aristocrat in Transylvania from the prestigious Mikes family.

He served as Captain General of Háromszék (one of the geographical regions of Székely Land) in 1691. He was created Baron by Leopold I in 1693. Three years later he earned the title of Count for his family. Later he was appointed Ispán (Count; comes) of Belső-Szolnok County in 1700.

During the Rákóczi's War of Independence, he was captured by the kuruc in 1703. After that he became a supporter of Francis II Rákóczi. He was elected to the Kuruc Senate by the Diet of Marosvásárhely (today: Târgu Mureș, Romania) in 1707. He functioned as commander of the exiled kuruc people in the Romanian principalities (Moldavia and Wallachia) with a rank of General. He was a member of the Transylvanian Gubernium ("Governorate") in 1713.

== Sources ==
- Mihály Mikes, in Magyar Életrajzi Lexikon 1000-1990
