= Zsigmond Kemény =

Hungarian writer

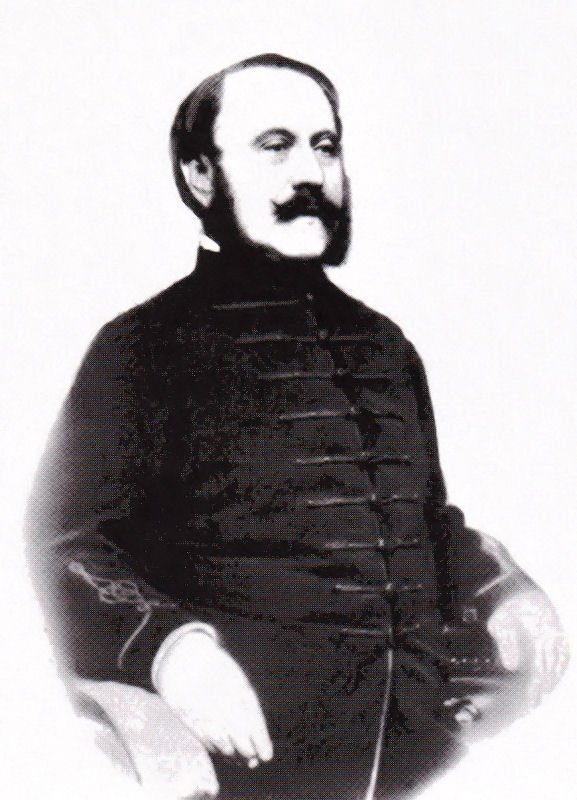
Zsigmond Kemény

Baron Zsigmond Kemény (June 12, 1814 – December 22, 1875) was a Hungarian writer.

== Life and work ==
Kemény was born in Alvincz, Principality of Transylvania, Kingdom of Hungary, Austrian Empire (today Vințu de Jos, Romania) to a distinguished noble family, but family feuds left him with little personal wealth. His early schooling in Nagyenyed (today Aiud, Romania) gave him knowledge of English law, French law and German law, politics and culture. In 1837 he studied jurisprudence at Marosvásárhely (today Târgu-Mureş, Romania), but soon devoted himself entirely to journalism and literature. His first unfinished work, On the Causes of the Disaster of Mohács (1840), attracted much attention. In the same year he studied natural history and anatomy at Vienna University. In 1841, along with Lajos Kovács, he edited the Transylvanian newspaper Erdélyi Híradó. He also took an active part in provincial politics and warmly supported the principles of Count István Széchenyi. In 1846 he moved to Pest, where his pamphlet, Korteskedés és ellenszerei ("Partisanship and its Antidote"), had already made him famous. In Pest he discovered others who shared his liberalism and desire for reformation, and for a time was on the staff of the Pesti Hirlap. The same year he brought out his first great novel, Gyulai Pál. His lifelong interest in politics led to him becoming an outspoken public speaker, and in 1848 Kemény was elected a member of the revolutionary diet, promoting the idea of an independent Hungary. After a brief exile he accepted the amnesty and returned to Hungary. In 1857 he wrote his most famous novel: Özvegy és leánya ("The widow and her daughter").

Kemény's enthusiasm for Hungarian independence had waned, believing that the European balance of power would never accept an independent Hungary, and advocated a policy of reconciliation with Austria. After the failure of Lajos Kossuth's radical nationalist policies, Kemény claimed that these ideas did not best serve the Hungarian people. He proposed compromise with Austria and moderation in politics, in his two pamphlets, Forradalom után ("After the Revolution") and Még egy szó a forradalom után ("One word more after the Revolution"). This tactic only succeeded in making him unpopular.

He subsequently edited the newspaper Pesti Napló. In this paper Kemény promoted the Hungarian Passive Resistance movement. He also published several political essays (e.g. "The Two Wesselényis", and "István Széchenyi"). During the 1860s Kemény took an active part in the political movement led by statesman Ferenc Deák, whose right hand he continued to be, and popularized the Austro-Hungarian Compromise of 1867 that Deák helped bring about; however, later he denounced it. Kemény was elected to the diet of 1867 for one of the divisions of Pest, but took no part in the debates. The last years of his life were passed in seclusion in Transylvania.

== Literary style ==
Kemény's political work should not overshadow his novels, which were remarkable for their lively dialogue, as well as their pessimistic outlook. His writing differed from his contemporaries in that his protagonists' fate was not directly linked to their moral standards. That is, the virtuous weren't unconditionally rewarded, and sometimes the wicked went unpunished. His characters were thwarted by everyday frustrations and minor carelessness; they are not struck by lightning, they are more likely to be consumed by a fire caused by a carelessly dropped match. The fine historical novel A rajongók ("The Fanatics") (Pest, 1858–1859) is generally regarded as his best.
