= List of chancellors of Transylvania =

The following is the list of chancellors of Transylvania during the Principality of Transylvania (1570–1711) and the (Grand) Principality of Transylvania (1711–1867).

== List of chancellors ==
=== Principality of Transylvania ===
Name	Date	Prince	Note
Mihály Csáky	1556–1571	John Sigismund Zápolya	
Ferenc Forgách	1571–1575	Stephen Báthory	
Imre Sulyok	1576–1578	Stephen Báthory	
Márton Berzeviczy	1578–1586	Stephen Báthory	for Stephen Báthory in Poland
Farkas Kovacsóczy	1578–1594	Stephen Báthory, From 1586: Sigismund Báthory	for voivodes Christopher Báthory and Sigismund Báthory until 1586
István Jósika	1594–1598	Sigismund Báthory	
Demeter Naprágyi	1598–1600	Rudolf, From August 1598: Sigismund Báthory, From March 1599: Andrew Báthory	
Vacant	1600–1603	Michael the Brave, From 1601: Sigismund Báthory, From 1602: Rudolf	headed by a secretary of the Chancellery
János Jacobinus	1603	Mózes Székely	
Mihály Káthay	1604–1606	Rudolf, From 1605, Stephen Bocskay	appointed by Stephen Bocskay.
Vacant	1606–1607	Stephen Bocskay	Secretary: Simon Péchi
János Petki	1607–1608	Sigismund Rákóczi	
István Kendi	1608–1610	Gabriel Báthory	
János Imreffy	1610–1611	Gabriel Báthory	
Vacant	1611–1613	Gabriel Báthory	Secretary: György Hidy
Simon Péchi	1613–1621	Gabriel Bethlen	
Vacant	1621–1622	Gabriel Bethlen	Secretary: István Kovacsóczy
István Kovacsóczy	1622–1634	Gabriel Bethlen, From 1629, Catherine of Brandenburg, In 1630, Stephen Bethlen, From December 1630, George I Rákóczi	
Vacant	1634–1656	George I Rákóczi, From 1648, George II Rákóczi	Master of the Judgement: István Kassai (1634–1644), Secretary: János Szalárdi (1644–1649), Secretary: János Pálóczi Horváth (1649–1656)
Mihály Mikes	1656–1660	George II Rákóczi, 1657–1658: disputed Prince Francis Rhédey	
János Bethlen; Acting Chancellor: Farkas Bethlen (1676–1677)	1659–1676; 1677–1678	Ákos Barcsay, From 1661, John Kemény, From 1662, Michael I Apafi	appointed by Ákos Barcsay, when Mihály Mikes still held the office
Farkas Bethlen	1678–1679	Michael I Apafi	
Vacant	1679–1688	Michael I Apafi	the distribution of functions among several persons
Mihály Teleki	1688–1690	Michael I Apafi; Field Marshal Antonio Caraffa	appointed by Leopold I, Transylvania was occupied
Transylvanian Court Chancellery	Since 1694	Habsburg rule	Diploma Leopoldinum end of the independent Transylvania

=== Habsburg rule ===
The Transylvanian Court Chancellery was established in 1694, according to the Diploma Leopoldinum, modeled on its Hungarian counterpart. Leopold I also created the Gubernium ("Governorate") which was the main governmental body of Transylvania until the Austro-Hungarian Compromise of 1867.

During the reign of Joseph II the Hungarian and Transylvanian Court Chancelleries were merged in 1787. The King withdrew his, among others, regulation on his deathbed.

Name	Date	Note
Miklós Bethlen	1691–1708	Chancellor
Sámuel Kálnoky	1694–1706	Court Chancellor
Pál Ráday	1707–1710 (?)	Director of Francis II Rákóczi's Transylvanian Chancellery
Zsigmond Kornis	1710–1713	Court Chancellor; Governor (1713–1731)
János Bornemisza	1713–1740	Chancellor
László Gyulaffi	1740–1754	Court Chancellor
Gábor Bethlen	1754–1765	Court Chancellor
Samuel von Brukenthal	1766–1777	Chancellor; Chairman of the Gubernium (1774–1777), Governor (1777–1787)
Károly Jeromos Pálffy	1787–1791	Court Chancellor of Hungary and Transylvania
Sámuel Teleki	1791–1822	Court Chancellor
Miklós Jósika	1822–1834	Lord Chancellor
Vacant	1834–1837	
Elek Nopcsa	1837–1844	Court Chancellor
Vacant	1844–1846	
Sámuel Jósika	1846–1848	Court Chancellor
Vacant	1848–1860	Chancellery was disbanded by Francis Joseph after the Hungarian Revolution of 1848
Ferenc Kemény	1860–1861	Chancellor
Ferenc Nádasdy	1861–1865	Court Chancellor
Ferenc Haller	1865–1867	Court Chancellor

== See also ==
- Governor of Transylvania
- List of rulers of Transylvania
- Principality of Transylvania (1570–1711)
- Voivode of Transylvania
