= Stephen Bocskai =

Prince of Transylvania

- Prince of Transylvania and Hungary
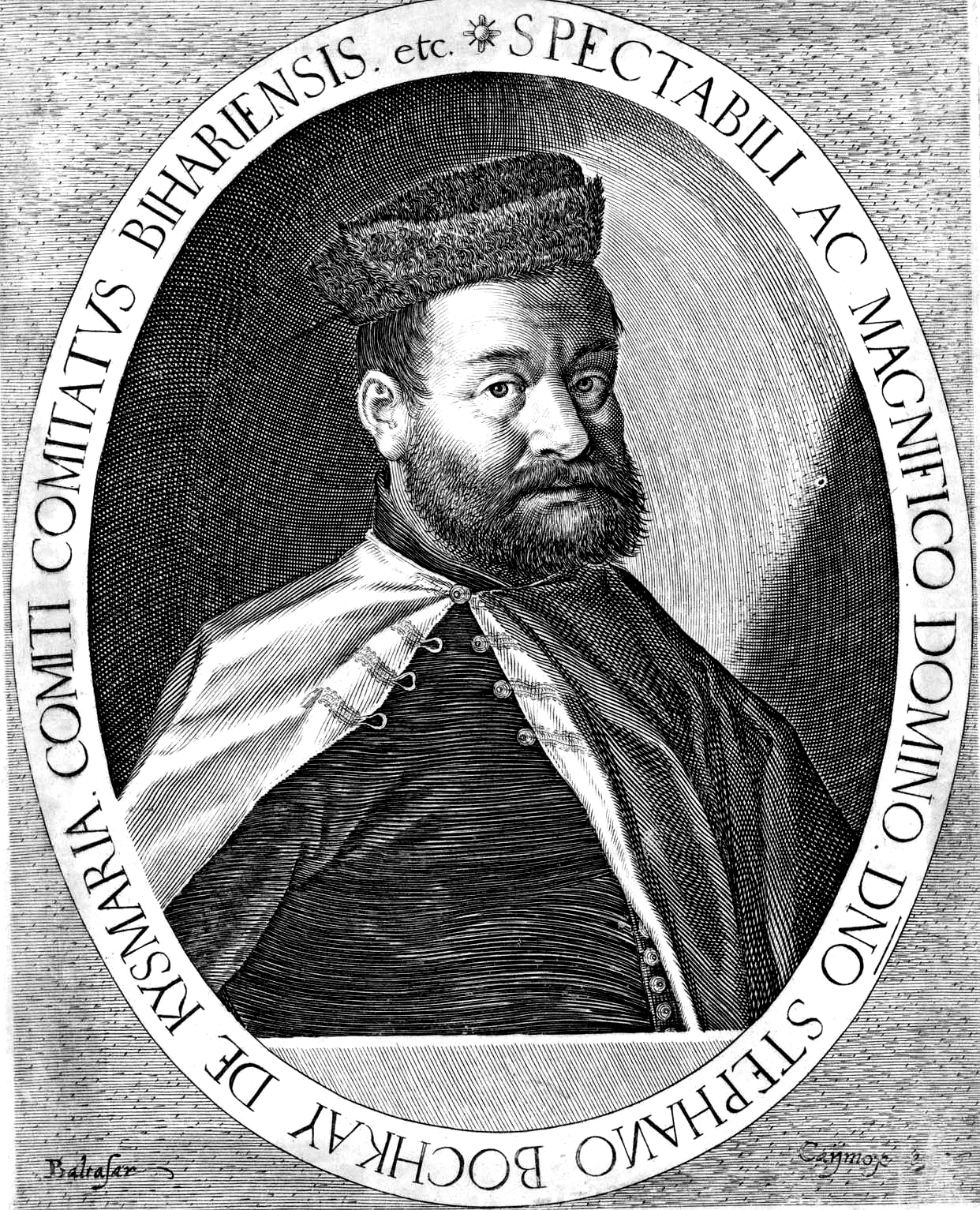

Prince of Transylvania
- Reign: 1605–1606
- Successor: Sigismund Rákóczi
- Born: Bocskai István; 1 January 1557; Kolozsvár, Eastern Hungarian Kingdom
- Died: 29 December 1606 (aged 49); Kassa, Royal Hungary
- Burial: 22 January 1607; St. Michael's Cathedral; Gyulafehérvár, Transylvania (now Alba Iulia, Romania)
- Spouse: Margit Hagymássy
- Father: György Bocskai
- Mother: Krisztina Sulyok
- Religion: Reformed

Stephen Bocskai or Bocskay (Hungarian: Bocskai István, Slovak: Štefan Bočkaj; 1 January 1557 – 29 December 1606) was Prince of Transylvania and Hungary from 1605 to 1606. He was born to a Hungarian noble family. His father's estates were located in the eastern regions of the medieval Kingdom of Hungary, which developed into the Principality of Transylvania in the 1570s. He spent his youth in the court of the Holy Roman Emperor, Maximilian, who was also the ruler of Royal Hungary (the western and northern regions of the medieval kingdom).

Bocskai's career started when his underage nephew, Sigismund Báthory, became the ruler of Transylvania in 1581. After the Diet of Transylvania declared Sigismund of age in 1588, Bocskai was one of the few members of Sigismund's council who supported his plan to join an anti-Ottoman coalition. Sigismund made Bocskai captain of Várad (now Oradea in Romania) in 1592. After the pro-Ottoman noblemen forced Sigismund to renounce his throne in 1594, Bocskai supported him in his bid to regain it, for which Sigismund rewarded him with estates confiscated from the leaders of the opposition. On Sigismund's behalf Bocskai signed a treaty concerning the membership of Transylvania in the Holy League in Prague on 28 January 1595. He led the Transylvanian army to Wallachia, which had been occupied by the Ottomans. The Christian troops liberated Wallachia and defeated the retreating Ottoman army in the Battle of Giurgiu on 29 September 1595.

After a series of Ottoman victories, Sigismund abdicated in early 1598. The commissioners of Maximilian II's successor, Rudolph, took possession of Transylvania and dismissed Bocskai. Bocskai then persuaded Sigismund to return, but Sigismund once again abdicated in March 1599. The new prince, Andrew Báthory, confiscated Bocskai's estates in Transylvania proper. Andrew Báthory was dethroned by Michael the Brave of Wallachia. During the following period of anarchy, Bocskai was forced to stay in Prague for several months because Rudolph's officials did not trust him. After his secret correspondence with the Grand Vizier, Lala Mehmed Pasha, was captured in October 1605, Bocskai openly rebelled against Rudolph.

Bocskai hired Hajdús (irregular soldiers) and defeated Rudolph's military commanders. He expanded his authority over the Partium, Transylvania proper, and nearby counties with the support of the local noblemen and burghers who had also been stirred up by Rudolph's tyrannical acts. Bocskai was elected prince of Transylvania on 21 February 1605, and prince of Hungary on 20 April. The Ottomans supported him, but his partisans thought that the Ottomans' intervention threatened the independence of Royal Hungary. To put an end to the civil war, Bocskai and Rudolph's representatives signed the Treaty of Vienna on 23 June 1606. Rudolph acknowledged Bocskai's hereditary right to rule the Principality of Transylvania and four counties in Royal Hungary. The treaty also confirmed the Protestant noblemen and burghers' right to freely practise their religion. In his last will, Bocskai emphasized that only the existence of the Principality of Transylvania could secure the special status of Royal Hungary within the Habsburg monarchy.

== Early life ==
Stephen was the sixth or seventh child of György Bocskai and Krisztina Sulyok. His father was a Hungarian nobleman whose inherited estates were located in Bihar and Zemplén Counties. Stephen's mother was related to the influential Török and Héderváry families. One of her two sisters was the wife of István Dobó. Dobó was made Voivode of Transylvania by Ferdinand I, King of Hungary, in 1553, shortly after Isabella Jagiellon (who had administered the eastern part of the Kingdom of Hungary on behalf of her son, John Sigismund Zápolya) was forced to leave her realm. György Bocskai accompanied Dobó to Transylvania and received new estates in the province from Ferdinand.

Stephen was born in Kolozsvár (now Cluj-Napoca in Romania) on 1 January 1557. At that time, his father was being held in prison because Isabella Jagiellon had returned and ordered the imprisonment of Ferdinand's supporters. A few months after his son's birth, György Bocskai was released. He and his family settled in Kismarja, which was the center of his estates in Bihar County. He converted from Catholicism to Calvinism in the 1560s. He died in 1570 or 1571.

Stephen Báthory, who succeeded Zápolya in 1571, protected the interests of György Bocskai's orphaned children. At Báthory's request, Ferdinand I's successor, Maximilian, restored to them their father's former estates in Zemplén County. The teenager Stephen Bocskai may have already moved to Maximilian's court – it is known that a son of Krisztina Sulyok was reportedly living in Vienna in 1571 – but it is certain that he was living in the royal court when his elder brother, Jeromos, died in 1572, because he hurried back to Kismarja from Vienna to console his mother. Initially, he served as a page in the royal court. He received a salary from 1574. He again came back to Kismarja in the summer of 1575 to see his ailing mother and to administer his estates. About a year later, he returned to Vienna where he was made a steward.

After being elected King of Poland in late 1575, Stephen Báthory adopted the title of prince of Transylvania and charged his brother, Christopher Báthory, with the government of the principality. Christopher was the husband of Bocskai's sister, Elisabeth. Maximilian, who had a very tolerant attitude towards the ideas of the Reformation, died on 12 October 1576. His devout Catholic son, Rudolph, succeeded him. Before long, Bocskai left Prague and settled in the Principality of Transylvania. He was not appointed to higher offices during Christopher's rule. He was only made the commander of a troop of 32 horsemen and 20 foot soldiers in Várad.

== Career ==
=== Councillor ===
The dying Christopher Báthory appointed Bocskai to the council that was set up to administer Transylvania during the minority of the son of Christopher Báthory and Elisabeth Bocskai, Sigismund, in the spring of 1581. As the youngest member of the regency council, Bocskai had little chance of influencing the government, then dominated by Sándor Kendi and Farkas Kovacsóczy. Bocskai and Dénes Csáky decided to go to Kraków to convince Stephen Báthory to make their ally, János Ghyczy, the sole regent for Sigismund. However, before their departure for Poland, Stephen Báthory set up a new regency council, confirming Kendi and Kovacsóczy's position. Bocskai was appointed head of Sigismund's court, but he renounced the office because his relationship with the regency council remained tense. He only retained his membership in the royal council.

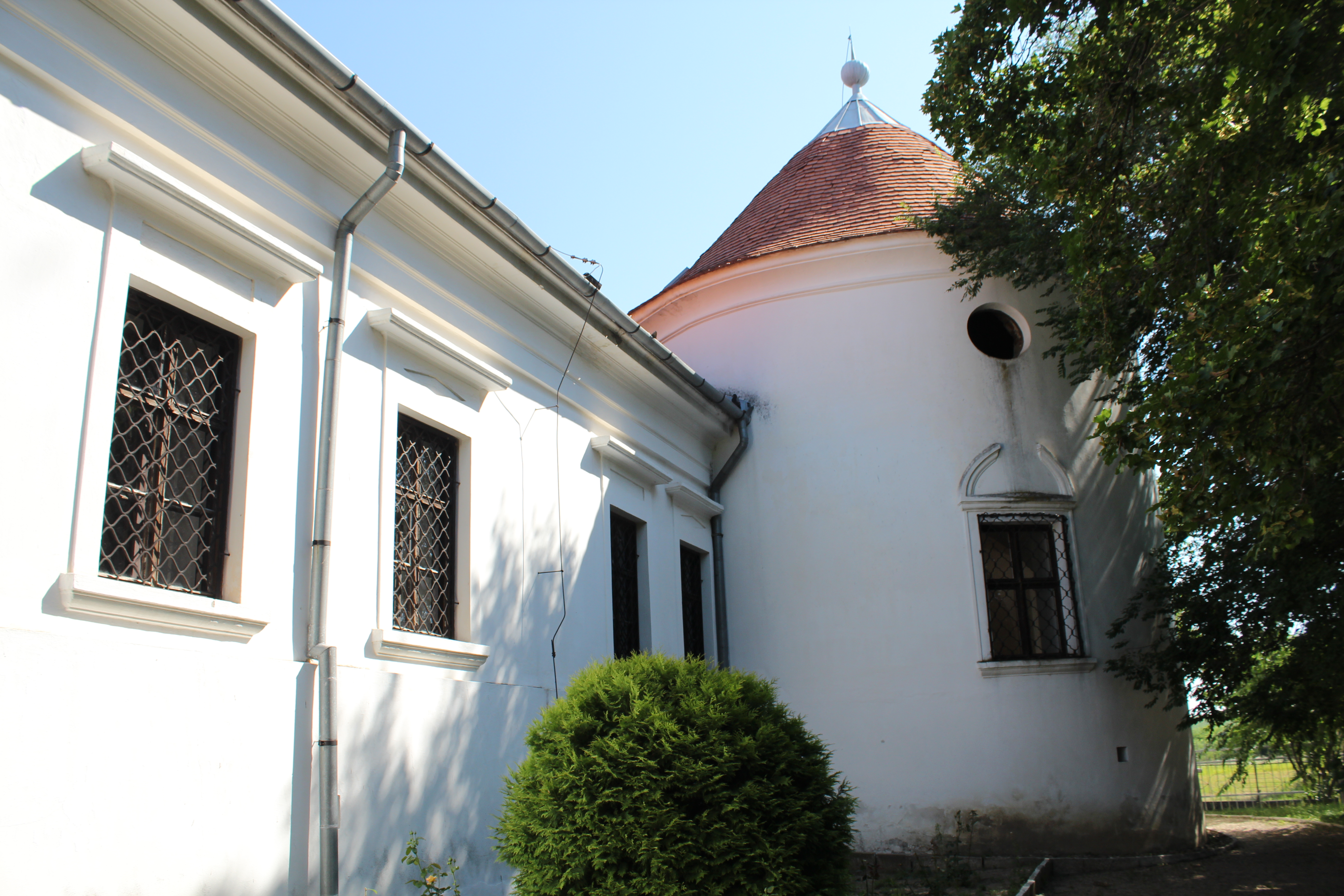
A bastion of Bocskai's castle at Nagykereki

Bocskai married a wealthy widow, Margit Hagymássy, in late 1583. Her dowry included the fortress of Nagykereki and the nearby villages. Stephen Báthory dissolved the regency council and appointed Ghyczy to administer Transylvania on Sigismund's behalf in May 1585. Bocskai retained his seat in the royal council. After Stephen Báthory died in December 1586, Bocskai went at least twice to Poland to negotiate the implementation of Báthory's last will. During his visits, he realized that most Polish noblemen did not want to continue Báthory's policy and Transylvania could no longer expect support from Poland.

Ghyczy fell ill in early 1588. The 16-year-old monarch's cousins, Balthasar Báthory and Stephen Báthory (the namesake of his late uncle), persuaded the Diet of Transylvania to declare the prince of age in December 1588. Bocskai again retained his membership in the royal council. Political rivalries gave rise to the spread of gossip about Balthasar's attempts to dethrone Sigismund. Some rumours also circulated about Bocskai, either describing him as Sigismund's most faithful councillor or accusing him of a conspiracy against the Báthory family. Bocskai established a strong relationship with the commanders of the army around that time.

=== Captain of Várad ===
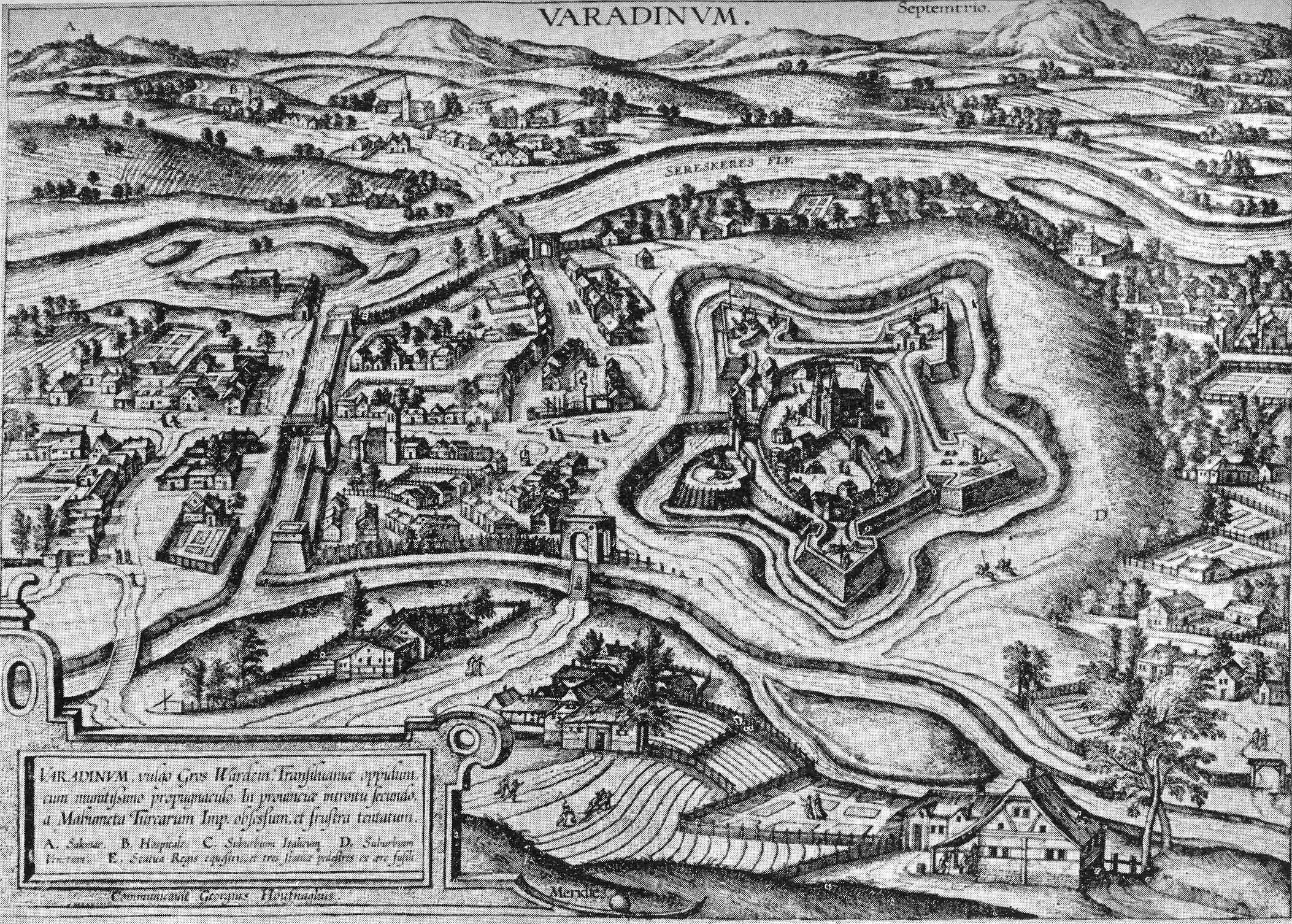
The fortress of Várad (now Oradea in Romania) in 1598 (an engraving by Joris Hoefnagel)

Influenced by his Jesuit confessor, Alfonso Carillo, Sigismund Báthory decided to turn against the Ottoman Empire. His cousins sharply opposed his plan, which outraged Sigismund. He replaced Stephen Báthory with Bocskai, making the latter captain of Várad and ispán (or head) of Bihar County in May 1592. The captains of Várad were the commanders of the strongest army in the principality. Sigismund, who was a devout Catholic, ordered the Calvinist Bocskai to protect the Catholics in his new seat. Bocskai continued the reconstruction of the fortress, which protected the most important route between Transylvania and Royal Hungary.

The Ottoman Sultan, Murad III, ordered the Grand Vizier, Koca Sinan Pasha, to invade Royal Hungary in August 1593. In the same month, Ferenc Wathay (who was the cousin of Bocskai's wife) visited Bocskai in Várad. In his memoir, Wathay mentioned that his commander, Ferdinand Hardegg ("the king's representative"), had ordered him to meet Bocskai. Young Transylvanian noblemen hurried to Royal Hungary to fight against the Ottomans, but most Transylvanian politicians wanted to avoid war with the Ottoman Empire as long as Poland remained neutral. Sigismund did not abandon his plan to fight against the Ottomans, but only Bocskai and Ferenc Geszthy, who was the captain of Déva (now Deva in Romania), supported him in the royal council.

Crimean Tatars stormed into Hungary and pillaged the Partium in June 1594, forcing Bocskai to stay in Várad. Sigismund Báthory convoked the Diet, but the delegates of the Three Nations of Transylvania refused to declare war against the Ottoman Empire. Taking advantage of the prince's failure, Balthasar Báthory persuaded him to abdicate in late July. Sigismund went to Kővár (now Remetea Chioarului in Romania), and then announced that he wanted to move to Italy. Ferenc Kendi and Kovacsóczy prevented Balthasar from securing the princely throne for himself.

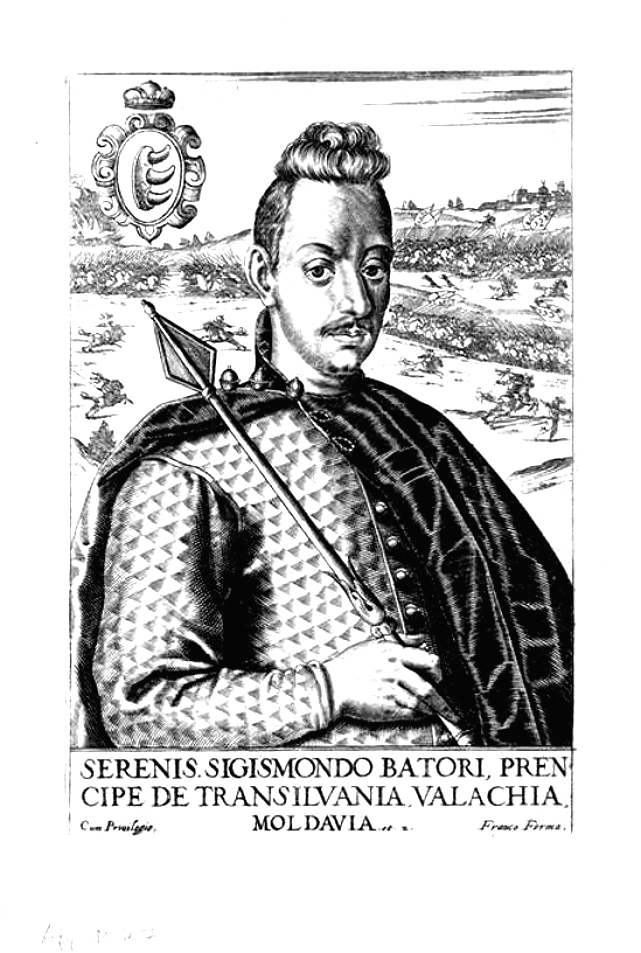
Bocskai's nephew, Sigismund Báthory, Prince of Transylvania

Bocskai and the other commanders of the army hurried to Kővár, where they and Friar Carillo convinced Sigismund to change his mind. Bocskai and his troops accompanied Sigismund back to Kolozsvár, forcing the delegates of the Three Nations to again pay homage to him on 27 August. A day later, fifteen leaders of the opposition were arrested at the prince's order. In a few days, many of them (including Balthasar Báthory and Farkas Kovacsóczy) were executed or murdered. Years later, Sigismund Báthory told Ferenc Nádasdy that Bocskai had forced him to order their execution. Most historians also say that Bocskai was responsible for the purge, which made him his nephew's most influential advisor.

Bocskai was made ispán of Inner Szolnok and Kraszna Counties. Many estates confiscated from the executed noblemen were granted to him during the following years, making him one of the wealthiest landowners of the principality. For instance, he seized the fortresses at Marosvécs in Transylvania proper (now Brâncovenești in Romania), and Szentjobb and Sólyomkő in Partium (now Sâniob and Șinteu in Romania).

Sigismund Báthory sent Bocskai as his plenipotentiary to Prague in November 1594 to start negotiations with the representatives of the anti-Ottoman Holy League. He signed a treaty regarding the membership of Transylvania in the League on 28 January 1595. The Holy Roman Emperor, Rudolph (who was also the king of Hungary), acknowledged the independence of Transylvania and promised his niece, Maria Christina, to Sigismund Báthory. Bocskai went to Graz, where he married Maria Christina as his nephew's proxy on 6 March. Upon his return to Transylvania, the Diet confirmed the treaty on 16 April. Bocskai accompanied Maria Christina from Kassa (now Košice in Slovakia) to Gyulafehérvár (present-day Alba Iulia in Romania) in July.

Sigismund Báthory made György Borbély Ban of Karánsebes (now Caransebeș in Romania), ordering him to invade the nearby Ottoman territories. Bocskai dispatched his deputy in Várad, György Király, to support Borbély's campaign. The Transylvanian army forced the Ottomans to abandon the fortresses along the Maros (Mureș) River before the end of October. However, Koca Sinan Pasha had meanwhile invaded Wallachia and captured Bucharest and Târgoviște. The Wallachian ruler, Michael the Brave, who had acknowledged Sigismund Báthory's suzerainty, was forced to retreat towards Transylvania. The grand vizier decided to transform Wallachia into an Ottoman province and made one of his commanders, Hasan Pasha, beylerbey (or governor) of Wallachia before he started to retreat in October.

To be able to provide military assistance to Michael of Wallachia, Sigismund Báthory promised the Székely commoners, who had earlier been reduced to serfdom, to restore their liberties if they joined his campaign on 15 September. More than 20,000 Székelys took up arms, enabling Sigismund to muster an army about 35,000 strong. Although the prince personally led the army to Wallachia, Bocskai was the actual commander of the campaign. After Michael the Brave and Sigismund's other vassal, Ștefan Răzvan of Moldavia, joined the campaign, their united troops laid siege to Târgoviște on 16 October. Two days later, Bocskai personally led the decisive attack against the fortress, forcing the Ottoman soldiers to abandon it and try to break through the besiegers. The Ottomans were either killed or captured. The Ottoman garrison abandoned Bucharest without resistance and the main Ottoman army retreated to Giurgiu on the Danube. By the time Sigismund's army reached the Danube, most Ottoman soldiers had crossed the river, but those who had stayed behind in Wallachia were massacred on 29 October. On the following day, the Ottoman fortress at Giurgiu was also occupied. After returning to Transylvania, Sigismund Báthory revoked his decision about the liberation of the Székelys on 12 December.

In January 1596 Sigismund Báthory left for Prague to start negotiations over the continuation of the war against the Ottomans. He charged Bocskai with the administration of Transylvania. Bocskai soon had to face the Székely commoners. Their leaders threatened those who accepted serfdom with impalement. Bocskai sent troops to Székely Land, ordering the punishment of the ringleaders. His lieutenants overrode his instructions and put down the rebellion with extreme cruelty during the "Bloody Carnival" of 1596.

Sigismund Báthory returned from Prague in March 1596. He personally led his troops against the Crimean Tatars and Ottomans who had broken into the Partium. During his absence, Bocskai administered the principality. After a series of Ottoman victories, Sigismund started negotiations regarding his abdication with the representatives of Rudolph. The agreement was signed in December 1597, but Rudolph did not send his representatives to take possession of Transylvania for months. During the transition period, the Catholic Chancellor of Transylvania, István Jósika, accused Bocskai of initiating a plot to seize Transylvania for himself, but Friar Carillo stood by Bocskai. Bocskai persuaded Sigismund Báthory to have Jósika imprisoned shortly before his official abdication. The prince also awarded him the title of baron on 29 March 1598.

=== Turmoil ===
The Diet of Transylvania swore fealty to Rudolph on 8 April 1598. Rudolph appointed three commissioners (István Szuhay, Bartholomeus Pezzen, and Miklós Istvánffy) to administer Transylvania until the arrival of his governor, Maximilian III, Archduke of Austria. The commissioners did not trust Bocskai and deprived him of his offices. Having been in correspondence with his nephew, Bocskai knew that Sigismund Báthory was already regretting his abdication. Bocskai mustered his troops at Szászsebes (now Sebeș in Romania) to secure Sigismund's return. After Sigismund came to Transylvania, Bocskai convoked the Diet and persuaded the delegates to swear fealty to him on 21 August. Jósika was executed and the commissioners were expelled.

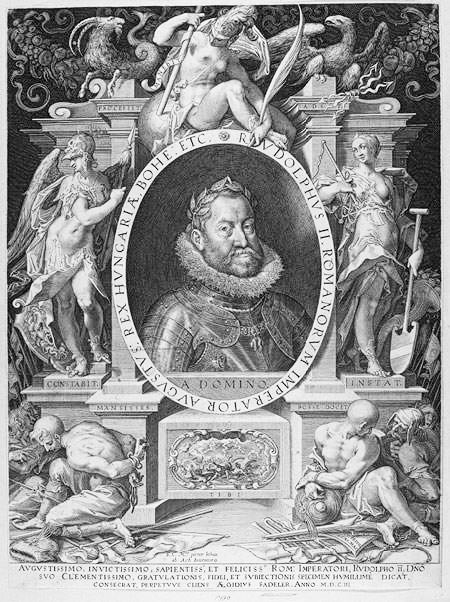
The Holy Roman Emperor, Rudolph, who was also the ruler of Royal Hungary, an engraving by Aegidius Sadeler (1603)

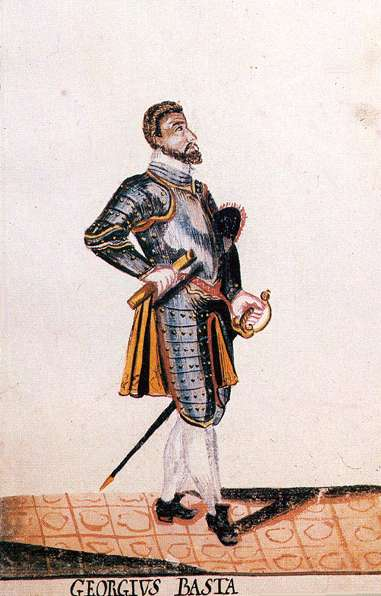
Rudolph's commander, Giorgio Basta, who planned to murder Bocskai

Bocskai was again made the supreme commander of the Transylvanian army, but his former deputy, György Király, did not obey him and allowed Rudolph's troops to take possession of Várad. An Ottoman army broke into the Partium, laid siege to Várad, and pillaged Bocskai's nearby estates in October. Sigismund made contact with his cousin, Andrew Báthory (who was the brother of the murdered Balthasar) and offered him possession of Transylvania. He kept his negotiations with Andrew secret because Bocskai had always been a strong opponent of the pro-Ottoman policy represented by Andrew. To get rid of his uncle, Sigismund dispatched him to Prague to start new negotiations with Rudolph in late 1598.

Bocskai was still in Prague when Sigismund abdicated in favor of Andrew in March 1599. He returned to Transylvania as Rudolph's envoy and refused to swear fealty to Andrew. He settled in his fortress at Szentjobb in August. Andrew summoned him to the Diet, accusing him of the murder of Balthasar. After Bocskai ignored the prince's summons, his estates were confiscated in October, but this order could only be executed in Transylvania proper because the Partium was controlled by the emperor's supporters. Bocskai was planning to invade Transylvania, but Michael of Wallachia (whom Andrew wanted to replace with one of his brothers) was quicker and broke into the principality. The Székelys joined Michael, who routed Andrew in the Battle of Sellenberk on 28 October. Michael entered Gyulafehérvár, and Székely peasants murdered Andrew.

After learning of Michael's victory, Bocskai hired Hajdús (irregular soldiers, famed for their cruelty) and hurried to Kolozsvár. He thought that Michael was willing to withdraw from Transylvania and urged Giorgio Basta, the commander of Rudolph's army, to send new commissioners to Transylvania to put an end to the anarchy. Michael took possession of Transylvania proper, and the Diet acknowledged him as Rudolph's representative. Exposed to plundering raids by German, Wallachian, and Székely troops, Transylvania plunged into anarchy. Bocskai returned to the Partium, but Rudolph ordered him to join Michael in Gyulafehérvár on 26 November. Michael tried to take advantage of Bocskai's presence to persuade the garrisons of the fortresses to swear fealty to him, but Bocskai did not want to be Michael's underling. After he realized that Michael did not want to restore his Transylvanian estates to him, he again left Transylvania proper and settled in Szentjobb in early 1600.

Bocskai sent letters to Rudolph in Prague, describing Michael as an uneducated trickster and tyrant who wanted to establish an empire of his own, but Rudolph's new commissioners, David Ungnad and Mihály Székely, did not trust him. Ungnad referred to him as "the Pestilence" in his secret correspondence. The Transylvanian noblemen held Bocskai responsible for the anti-Ottoman policy that had contributed to the destruction of the principality. Instead of seeking Bocskai's assistance against Michael, they persuaded Basta to expel Michael from Transylvania in September. Sigismund Báthory, who had again decided to return, tried to convince Bocskai to support him. Bocskai gave his nephew's envoy over to Rudolph's official, Pál Nyáry, but this did not earn him the trust of Rudolph's commissioners. Basta was even planning to kill him to prevent him from further actions. On 25 November, the Diet of Transylvania confiscated Bocskai's estates and banished him from the principality.

Bocskai went to Prague to clear himself of the charges in January 1601. Michael of Wallachia also came to Prague and persuaded Rudolph to allow him to return to Transylvania, while Bocskai was forbidden to leave Prague. Michael and Basta routed Sigismund Báthory on 3 August, but Basta had Michael murdered thirteen days later. Basta's mercenaries regularly pillaged Transylvanian towns and villages during the following years. Bocskai returned to the Partium before the end of 1601, but he was again summoned to Prague in April 1602. He was made the emperor's councillor, but he could leave Prague only in late 1602. He again settled in Szentjobb and made several attempts to secure the restoration of his confiscated Transylvanian estates, but Basta sharply opposed his plan.

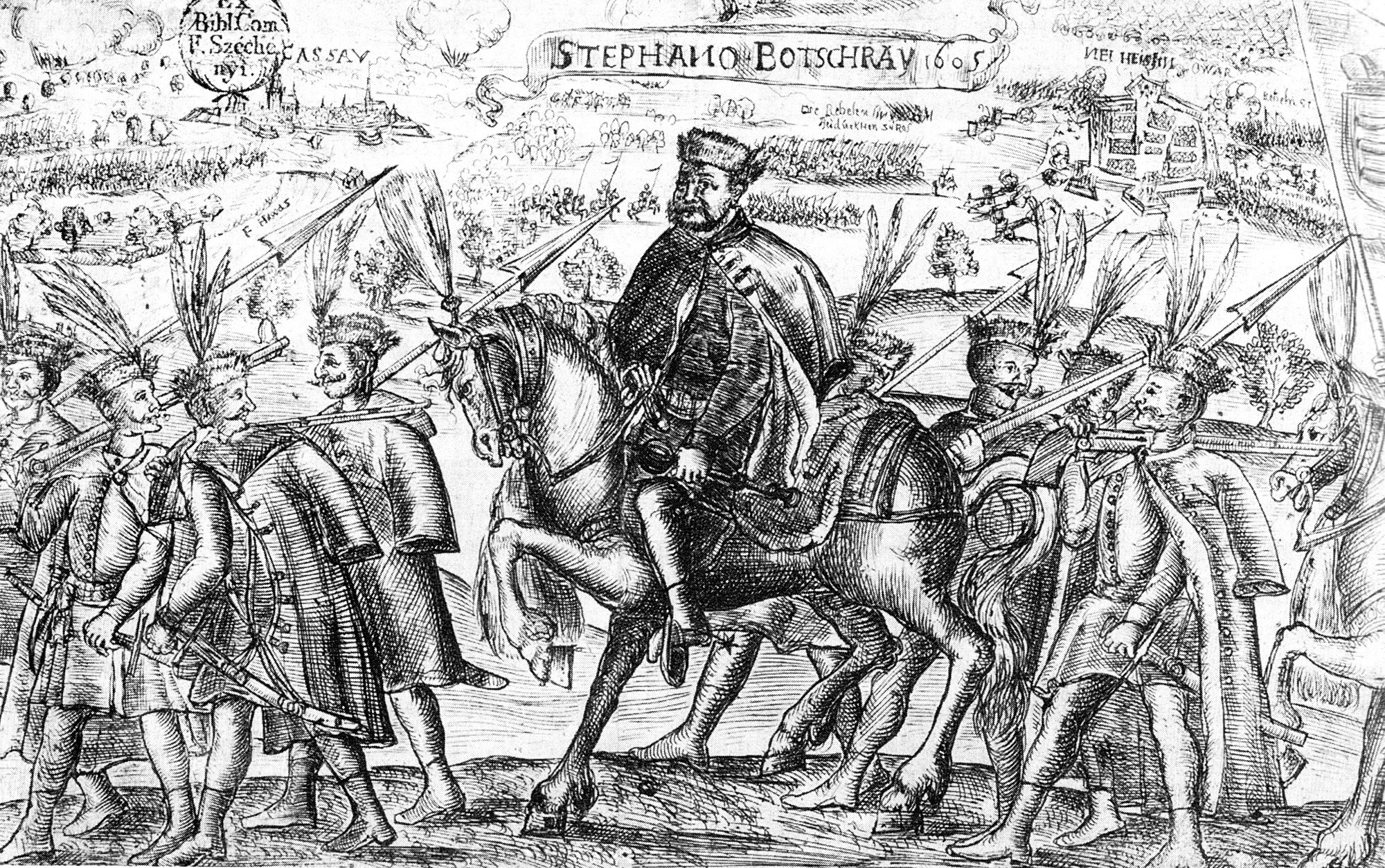
Bocskai and his hajduk warriors

From 1603, Rudolph's officials confiscated the estates of wealthy noblemen in both Royal Hungary and Transylvania through legal proceedings. After Giacomo Barbiano di Belgiojoso, the captain of Kassa, confiscated the St. Elisabeth Cathedral from the Lutherans and gave it to the Catholics in early 1604, Rudolph prohibited the Diet of Hungary from discussing religious issues. Belgiojoso wanted to borrow 20,000 florins from Bocskai in the spring of 1604, but Bocskai denied the loan. In retaliation, Belgioso ordered the collection of the tithe on Bocskai's estates even though the estates were exempt from the tax. Belgioso also imprisoned Bocskai's nephew, Dénes Bánffy, and only released him after Bocskai had paid a ransom.

The leader of the Transylvanian noblemen who had fled to the Ottoman Empire, Gabriel Bethlen, sent a letter to Bocskai urging him to rise up against Rudolph, but Bocskai refused. To reward Bocskai for his loyalty, Rudolph restored to him almost all his estates in Transylvania proper on 2 July 1604. Bocskai visited Transylvania and realized that the towns and villages had almost completely been destroyed during the previous years. His experiences convinced him that only an autonomous Transylvania supported by the Ottomans could secure the restoration of the freedom of Hungary. On his way back from Transylvania, on 20 September he learnt that Hajdús had seized a letter about his alleged correspondence with the Grand Vizier, Lala Mehmed Pasha, from Gabriel Bethlen. Fearing reprisals, Bocskai hurried to Sólyomkő and pretended that gout had paralysed him. Actually, he ordered his castellans to make preparations for resistance, but one of them revealed Bocskai's plans to Cipriano Concini, the deputy captain of Várad.

== Uprising and reign ==
=== First successes ===
Concini led his 600 soldiers to Szentjobb and captured the fortress on 2 October. The castellan of Bocskai's other castle, Nagykereki, hired 300 Hajdús, enabling him to defend the fortress against Concini. Belgioso sent an army against Bocskai, but Bocskai's agents convinced the Hajdús to desert from Belgioso's army, which enabled Bocskai to defeat Belgioso near Álmosd on 15 October. Belgioso withdrew from the Partium towards Kassa, but the predominantly Protestant townspeople did not allow him to enter the town. The mayor of the town, Johann Bocatius, persuaded the burghers to let Bocskai's Hajdús come to the town on 30 October.

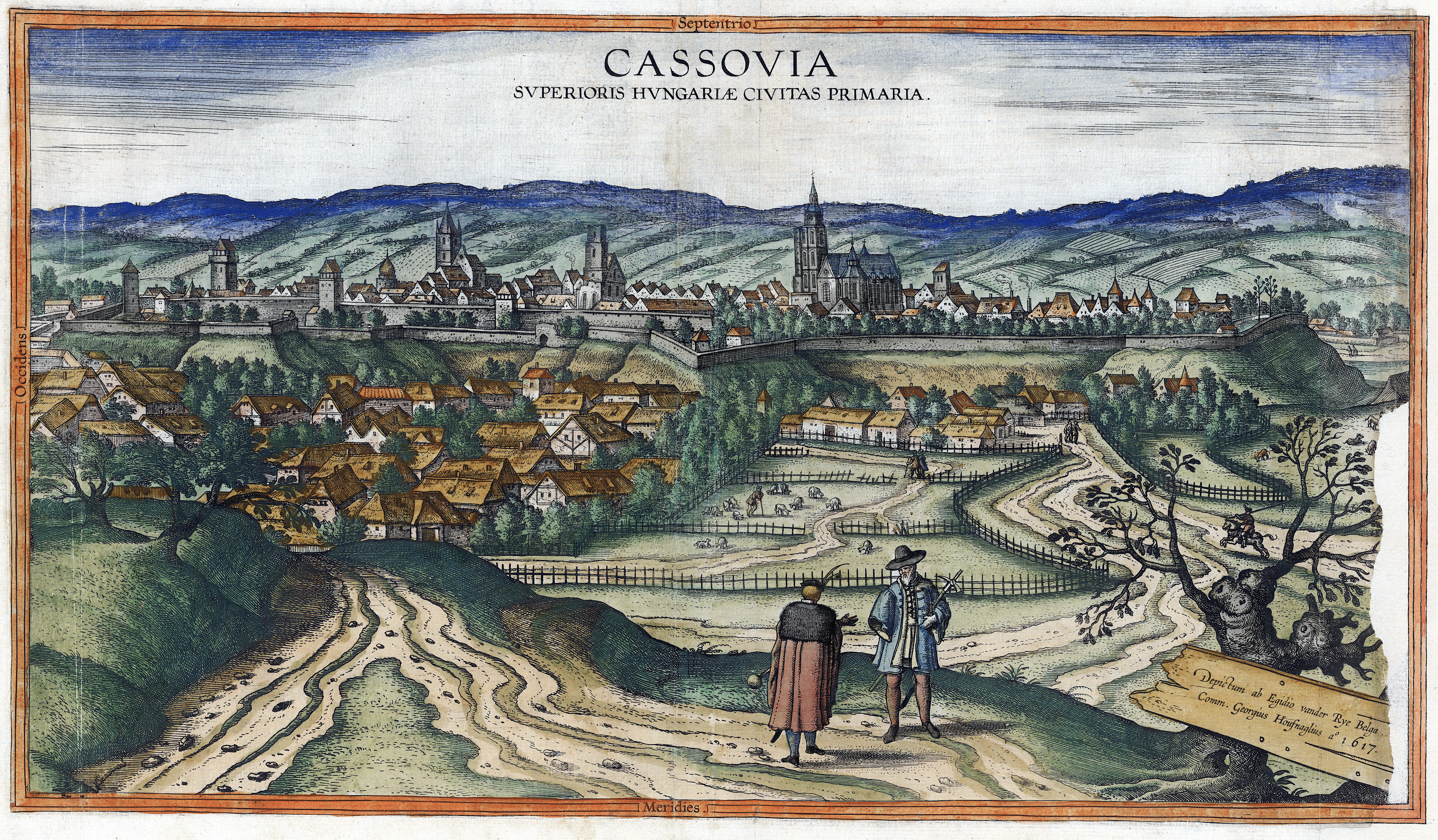
Kassa (now Košice in Slovakia) in 1617

Bocskai issued a proclamation to the noblemen from Kassa, reminding them of the tyrannical acts of Rudolph and his officials. The delegates of the counties and towns of Upper Hungary came to Kassa and voted the necessary funds to continue the fight. Bocskai made the young Calvinist lords, Bálint Drugeth and Ferenc Mágocsy, commanders of his army, and the Catholic nobleman, Mihály Káthay, his chancellor. Rudolph dispatched Giorgio Basta at the head of an army of 10,000 mercenaries against the rebels. Basta's disciplined army defeated a troop of Hajdús near Osgyán (now Ožďany in Slovakia) on 17 November.

Gabriel Bethlen came to Kassa on 20 November, accompanied by Lala Mehmed Pasha's envoy, who handed the sultan's ahidnâme (or charter) to Bocskai, which styled him prince of Transylvania. Lala Mehmed Pasha also sent reinforcements to Bocskai. Basta defeated Bocskai near Edelény on 27 November, but he could not capture Kassa and withdrew to Eperjes (now Prešov in Slovakia) in early December. Bocskai sent letters to Transylvania urging the leaders of the Three Nations to support his uprising. A Unitarian Székely nobleman, János Petki, was the first to join him. He played a crucial role in convincing the Székelys to forgive Bocskai for the Bloody Carnival of 1596. A Hajdú captain, Balázs Lippai, who had already questioned Bocskai's leadership, entered into correspondence with Basta. Bocskai had Lippai captured and executed on 6 January 1605. He made an alliance with Ieremia Movilă, Voivode of Moldavia, and promised the Székelys that he would restore their liberties, enabling him to secure his rule in Transylvania.

=== Elected prince ===
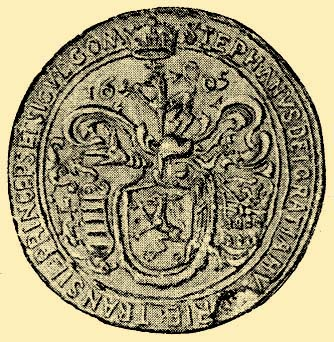
Bocskai's princely seal

The delegates of the Transylvanian noblemen and the Székelys elected him prince in Nyárádszereda (now Miercurea Nirajului in Romania) on 21 February, but the Transylvanian Saxons and the burghers of Kolozsvár remained loyal to Rudolph's commissioners. Bocskai sent proclamations, entitled Querelae Hungariae (Complaints of Hungary), to the royal courts of Europe in March, accusing Rudolph of tyranny and listing the monarch's unlawful acts that had caused the uprising. Rudolph promised to grant an amnesty for him, but on 24 March Bocskai refused the offer.

Basta withdrew his army from Eperjes to Pressburg (now Bratislava in Slovakia) in early April. The delegates of 22 counties from Upper Hungary and Partium assembled at Szerencs. They unanimously acclaimed Bocskai prince of Hungary on 20 April. Although the Transdanubian counties did not acknowledge his rule, Bocskai wanted to reunite the Kingdom of Hungary under his rule and urged the Sublime Porte to send a royal crown to him.

Bocskai's army captured Nagyszombat (now Trnava in Slovakia), Sümeg, Szombathely, Veszprém, and other towns in Transdanubia and also pillaged Lower Austria, Moravia, and Silesia in May. Michael Weiss persuaded the Saxons of Brassó (now Brașov in Romania) to acknowledge Bocskai's rule. The burghers of Kolozsvár also swore fealty to him on 19 May. Bocskai went to Transylvania in August. His army captured Segesvár (now Sighișoara in Romania) on 9 September, which put an end to the Saxons' resistance. The delegates of the Three Nations of Transylvania paid homage to him in Medgyes (now Mediaș in Romania) on 14 September.

=== Peace treaties ===
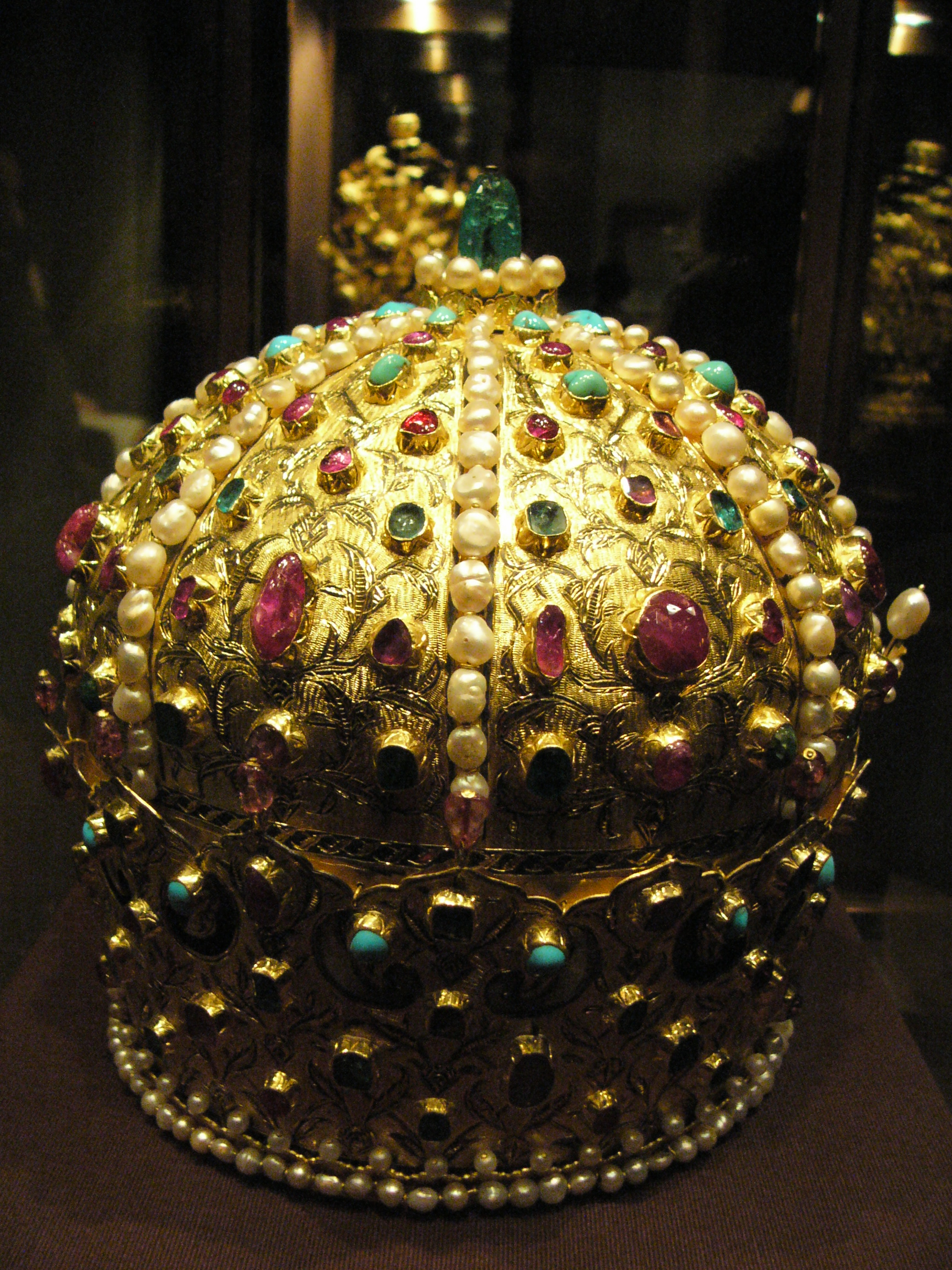
Crown of Stephen Bocskai (a diadem that the Grand Vizier, Lala Mehmed Pasha, gave to Bocskai)

The Ottomans took advantage of Bocskai's uprising. Lala Mehmed Pasha captured Esztergom on 3 October. Bocskai's commander, Bálint Drugeth, prevented his Ottoman allies from entering Érsekújvár (now Nové Zámky in Slovakia) when he forced the defenders of the town to give in on 17 October. Bocskai met Lala Mehmed Pasha at Pest on 11 November. The Grand Vizier styled Bocskai king and gave a royal crown to him, but he refused to accept it as a royal insignia.

After the fall of Esztergom to the Ottomans, István Illésházy and other influential noblemen realized that only the Habsburgs were able to prevent the Ottomans from seizing new territories in Royal Hungary. They persuaded Bocskai to start negotiations with Rudolph's brother, Matthias, who had decided to dethrone Rudolph. Although the delegates of the eastern counties and the Hajdús still opposed the peace, the Diet authorized Bocskai to send his envoys to Vienna. On 12 December, Bocskai granted collective nobility to 9,254 Hajdús and settled them in his estates in Szabolcs County.

Bocskai's envoy, Illésházy, reached a compromise during his negotiations in Vienna on 9 February 1606. The royal court was ready to restore the traditional administration of Royal Hungary and confirm most liberties of the noblemen and burghers, but was unwilling to acknowledge the independence of Transylvania under Bocskai's rule. On 4 April the Diet of Transylvania authorized Bocskai to sign a treaty with the Habsburgs, but in May the Diet of Hungary ordered Illésházy to continue the negotiations with Matthias.

The negotiations ended with the Treaty of Vienna, which was signed on 23 June. The new treaty confirmed the right of the Protestant noblemen and burghers to freely practise their religion. Bocskai was acknowledged as the hereditary prince of Transylvania, which was expanded to Szabolcs, Szatmár, Ugocsa, and Bereg Counties and the castle of Tokaj. Bocskai confirmed the treaty in Kassa on 17 August.

Bocskai was willing to mediate a peace treaty between the Habsburgs and the Ottoman Empire. On 24 November Rudolph issued a new proclamation, stating that the Principality of Transylvania could retain its independence even if Bocskai died without male issue. The Peace of Zsitvatorok, which put an end to the Long Turkish War, was signed on 11 November.

=== Last months ===
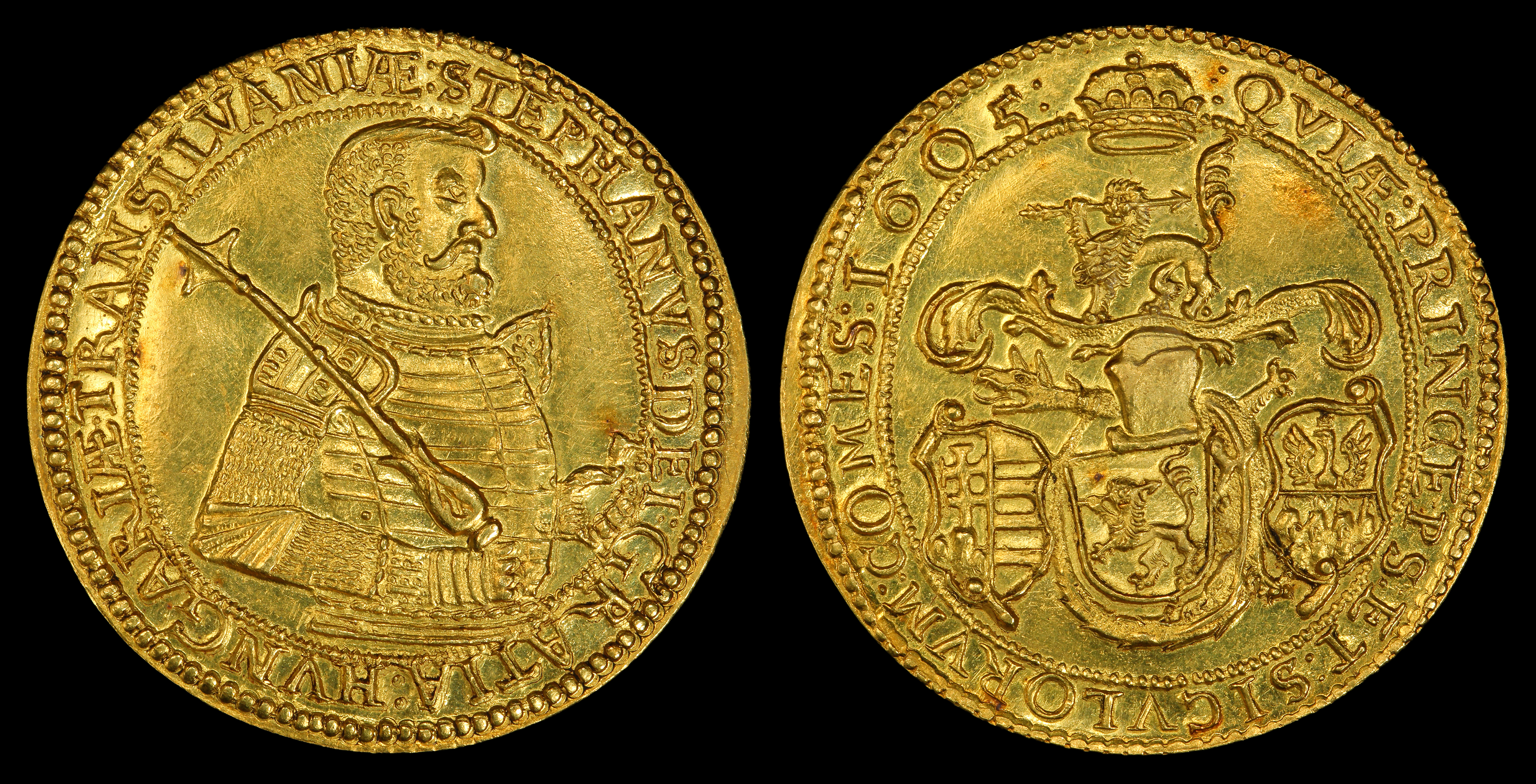
Bocskai's golden ducate, depicting the elderly prince

Bocskai had already in the spring of 1606 stated that his feet felt heavy, suggesting that he suffered from edema. On 13 December, he convoked the Diet to Kassa, but four days later he made his last will. He urged his successors to preserve the independence of Transylvania as long as the Habsburgs reigned in Royal Hungary. He named Bálint Drugeth as his successor before he died in Kassa on 29 December.

Bocskai's sudden death gave rise to rumours. The Hajdús accused his chancellor, Mihály Káthay, of having poisoned him. They also claimed that Káthay had falsified Bocskai's testament to prevent the young Gábor Báthory from seizing the throne. The Hajdús attacked Káthay on the main square of Kassa and cut him into pieces on 12 January 1607.

The funeral procession taking Bocskai's corpse to Gyulafehérvár departed from Kassa on 3 February. Drugeth led the procession, but the Diet of Transylvania did not want to elect him their ruler. Instead, they proclaimed the elderly Sigismund Rákóczi prince in Kolozsvár on 11 February. Bocskai was buried in the St Michael's Cathedral in Gyulafehérvár on 22 February.

As long as the Hungarian Crown is with a nation mightier than us, with the German, and the Hungarian Kingdom is also dependent of the Germans, it will be necessary and expedient to have a Hungarian prince in Transylvania, for he shall provide protection and be of use to them. If, may God grant, the Hungarian Crown were at Hungarian hands in a Hungary under a crowned king, we urge the Transylvanians neither to secede from it, nor to resist to it, but rather to make efforts, according to their abilities and with united will, to subject themselves to that Crown in the ancient way.

— Excerpt from Bocskai's last will

== Family ==
Ancestors of Stephen Bocskai

4. Simon Bocskai
2. György Bocskai
5. N. Kismarjai
1. Stephen Bocskai
12. István Sulyok
6. Balázs Sulyok
26. Imre Török
13. Krisztina Török
3. Krisztina Sulyok
7. Erzsébet Pethő

Bocskai's wife, Margit, was the daughter of Lestár Hagymássy (who was a lesser nobleman with estates in Zala County) and Katalin Csáby. Margit was born around 1560. Her dying mother made Lestár's brother, Kristóf Hagymássy, Margit's guardian around 1570. Kristóf Hagymássy was an influential member of the royal council in Transylvania. After her uncle died in 1577, Margit was put under the guardianship of Christopher Báthory (Bocskai's brother-in-law).

Margit was given in marriage to the wealthy Tamás Warkócs (who was related to the Báthory family) in 1579. Warkócs's estates were located near Bocskai's domains in Bihar County. She gave birth to two sons, Tamás and György, but only György survived childhood.

Her first husband died in early 1583. The year of mourning for him was still up, when Margit married Bocskai in late 1583. Their marriage was childless, but Bocskai loved his wife and took care of her son. He was also the guardian of the sons of his widowed sister, Sára. Margit Hagymássy died in September 1604.

After the Treaty of Vienna, Bocskai proposed himself to Maria Christina of Habsburg, whose marriage with Sigismund Báthory had been annulled. She and her mother were willing to accept the offer, but Rudolph I refuted it, saying that "the daughter of the mayor of Kassa would be fine for wife to Bocskai". Bocskai did not abandon the idea of a new marriage until his death.

== Legacy ==
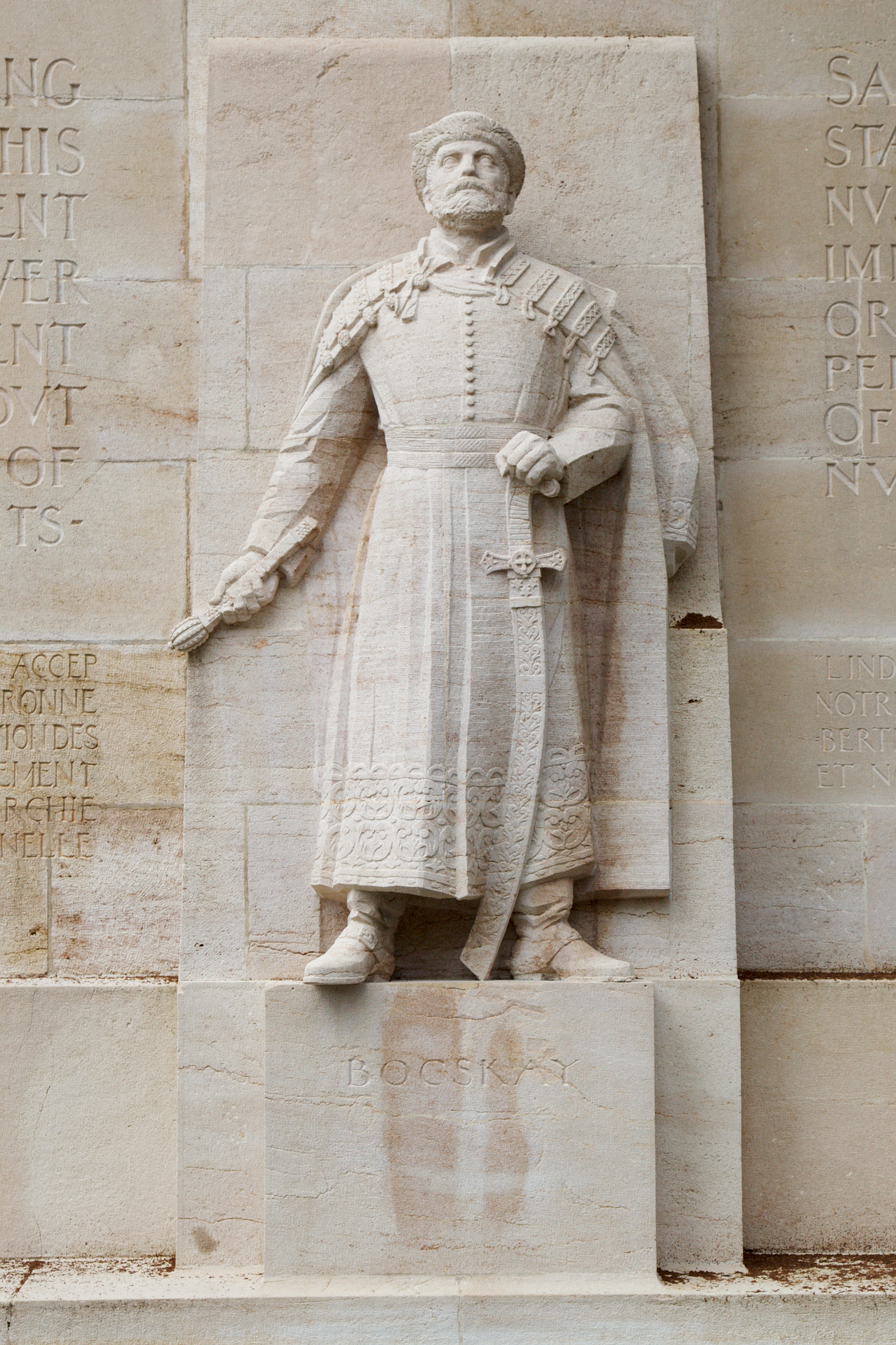
Bocskai's statue on the Reformation Wall (Geneva, Switzerland)

Even before his death, Bocskai's partisans regarded his uprising as a war for the independence of Hungary. The archivist János S. Debreceni described him as a new Gideon in December 1604. Most modern historians also regard him as the leader of a national movement which was an antecedent of Rákóczi's War of Independence and the Hungarian Revolution of 1848. Others state, Bocskai who was the Ottomans' ally did not take up arms for the restoration of an independent Kingdom of Hungary, because he could only hope to rule a country under Ottoman suzerainty. For instance, Géza Pálffy emphasizes, most Hungarian noblemen remained loyal to the Habsburg monarch, thus Bocskai's uprising should be described as a civil war.

Bocskai was also described as a champion of religious freedom. The Hajdús who joined him on 14 October 1604 emphasized that they wanted "to defend Christianity, our country and dear homeland, and especially the one true faith" (that is Calvinism). Shortly after Bocskai's death, Drugeth's priest, Menyhárt Bornemissza Váci, described him as a new Moses who could not enter the Promised Land. Bocskai was the first Calvinist prince of Transylvania. His statue can be found on the Reformation Wall in Geneva.

Although the Peace of Vienna and the laws of 1608 were eroded and partially neutralised as time went on by the pressures of Habsburg absolutism, they nevertheless represented an important landmark in Hungary's development and a valuable set of precedents for a people adept in the use of precedents. The new laws maintained and strengthened Hungary's claim to special treatment among the lands ruled by the Habsburg Monarchy; they established, for Hungary, the principle of religious freedom and ensured that Hungary would once again – for the time being, at least – be governed by Hungarian officers of state through the Hungarian Diet, and a Hungarian treasury. István Bocskai's achievement, of which he did not live to see the fruits, was substantial.

— Bryan Cartledge: The Will to Survive: A History of Hungary

The Bocskai coat is named after the prince.

== See also ==
- Peace of Nikolsburg
- Treaty of Szatmár
- Pragmatic Sanction of 1713
- Austro-Hungarian Compromise of 1867

== Sources ==
- Barta, Gábor (1994). "The Emergence of the Principality and its First Crises (1526–1606)". In Köpeczi, Béla; Barta, Gábor; Bóna, István; Makkai, László; Szász, Zoltán; Borus, Judit (eds.). History of Transylvania. Akadémiai Kiadó. pp. 247–300. ISBN 963-05-6703-2.
- Benda, Kálmán (1993). Bocskai István [Stephen Bocskai] (in Hungarian). Századvég. ISBN 963-8384-40-9.
- Cartledge, Bryan (2011). The Will to Survive: A History of Hungary. C. Hurst & Co. ISBN 978-1-84904-112-6.
- G. Etényi, Nóra; Horn, Ildikó; Szabó, Péter (2006). Koronás fejedelem: Bocskai István és kora [A Crowned Prince: Stephen Bocskai and his Time] (in Hungarian). General Press Kiadó. ISBN 963-9648-27-2.
- Granasztói, György (1981). "A három részre szakadt ország és a török kiűzése (1526–1605)". In Benda, Kálmán; Péter, Katalin (eds.). Magyarország történeti kronológiája, II: 1526–1848 [Historical Chronology of Hungary, Volume I: 1526–1848] (in Hungarian). Akadémiai Kiadó. pp. 361–430. ISBN 963-05-2662-X.
- Kontler, László (1999). Millennium in Central Europe: A History of Hungary. Atlantisz Publishing House. ISBN 963-9165-37-9.
- MacCulloch, Diarmaid (2004). The Reformation: A History. Viking. ISBN 0-670-03296-4.
- Pálffy, Géza (2009). "Szabadságharc volt-e Bocskai István mozgalma? [Was Stephen Bocskai's movement a war for independence?]" (PDF). História (in Hungarian). 30 (1): 7–10.
- Pop, Ioan-Aurel (2005). "The Romanians in the 14th–16th centuries from the "Christian Republic" to the "Restoration of Dacia"". In Pop, Ioan-Aurel; Bolovan, Ioan (eds.). History of Romania: Compendium. Romanian Cultural Institute (Center for Transylvanian Studies). pp. 209–314. ISBN 978-973-7784-12-4.
- Szabó, András (2010). "Téged Isten dicsérünk": Bocskai István, Erdély és Magyarország fejedelme ["Thee, O God, we praise": Stephen Bocskai, Prince of Transylvania and Hungary] (in Hungarian). Magyarországi Református Egyház Kálvin János Kiadója. ISBN 978-963-558-164-1.

Stephen Bocskai Born: 1 January 1557 Died: 29 December 1606
Regnal titles
Vacant Land of the Hungarian Crown Title last held by Moses Székely	Prince of Transylvania; 1605–1606	Succeeded by Sigismund Rákóczi
Vacant New creation	Prince of Hungary; 1605–1606	Vacant Dissolution
Political offices
Vacant Title last held by Gábor Pekry	Ispán of Bihar County; 1591–1599	Succeeded by Pál Nyáry
Vacant Title last held by Stephen Báthory	Ispán of Kraszna County; 1597	Vacant Title next held by Gabriel Báthory
Previous: Ferenc Theke	Ispán of Inner Szolnok County; 1597	Succeeded by Boldizsár Kornis
