= István Szamosközy =

Hungarian humanist and historian

- Stephanus Zamosius
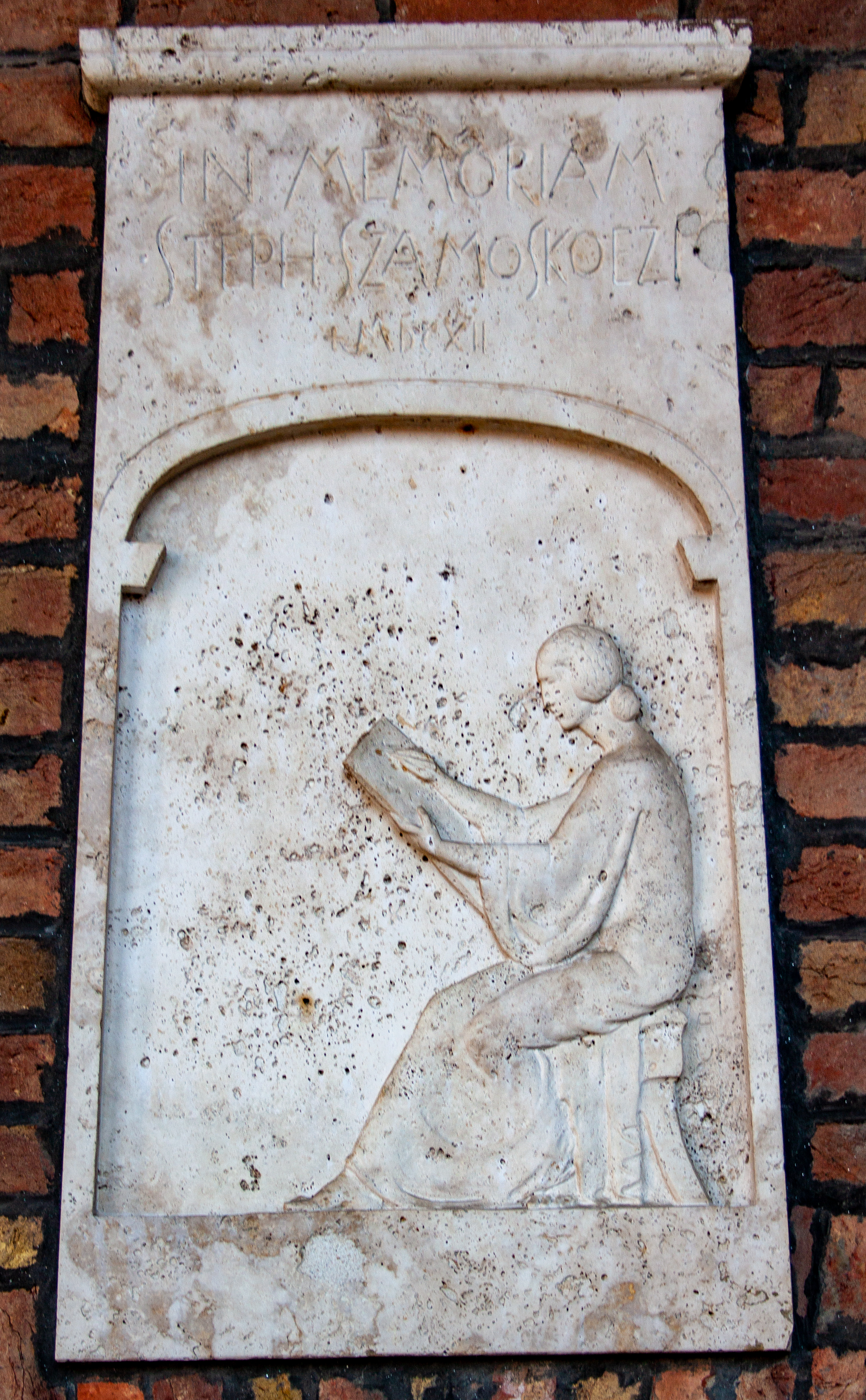
- Relief of Zamosius in the Szeged Pantheon
- Born: Szamosközy István; 1565; Kolozsvár, Principality of Transylvania (now Cluj-Napoca, Romania)
- Died: 1612 (aged 46–47); Gyulafehérvár, Principality of Transylvania (now Alba Iulia, Romania)
- Occupations: Humanist and historian

Academic background
- Education: Heidelberg University

István Szamosközy, latinised as Stephanus Zamosius (1565–1612) was a Hungarian humanist and historian.

== Life ==
Zamosius was probably born in 1565 in Kolozsvár, Principality of Transylvania (now Cluj-Napoca, Romania). His father moved there from the land between the Szamos and Tisza rivers, the family's place of origin. After his parents' premature death, he was taken care of by László Sombory who sent him as his son's, Sándor's companion to the University of Padua. He studied philosophy and history first in Heidelberg University, then, from 1591 to 1593, in Padua. Zamosius's work as a historian started in 1587 and was heavily influenced by classical writers and humanism, exposed to him in his fatherland, a Protestant center, and Italy.

In 1593 he returned to Transylvania and started to work at Gyulafehérvár for the archive of the Transylvanian court. There he started collecting materials and writing his major work on Hungarian history.

Stephen Bocskai nominated him as the official court historian.

== Works ==
- In Padova he published a Collection of Roman inscriptions in Dacia
- he published also a numismatic treatise

His unfinished Hungarian history was never published but parts are extant in many manuscript copies. Farkas Bethlen saved longer parts in his Transylvanian history. He designed his work based on the example of Antonio Bonfini's Decades (Tenths). Sándor Szilágyi published Zamosius's works in four volumes in Szamosközy történeti maradványai, Budapest 1876–1880.

- Hebdomanes (Sevenths)
- Pentates (Fifths)
- History of the year 1594
- Analecta lapidum vetustorum et nonnullarum in Dacia antiquitatum

== Sources ==
- Kulcsár Péter, ed. (1977). Humanist Historians (Hungarian: Humanista Történetírók). Budapest: Szépirodalmi Könyvkiadó.
