= István Jósika =

Chancellor of Transylvania 1594-1598

Chancellor of Transylvania
- In office 1594–1598
- Monarch: Sigismund Báthory
- Preceded by: Farkas Kovacsóczy
- Succeeded by: Demeter Naprágyi

Personal details
- Died: 11 September 1598 Szatmár, Principality of Transylvania (today: Satu Mare, Romania)
- Spouse: Borbála Füzy
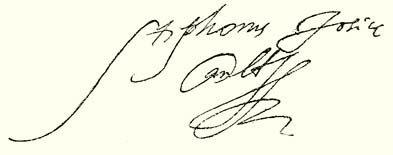
- Signature

Baron István Jósika de Branyicska, also Ștefan Jósika or Ștefan Iojică (? – 11 September 1598) was a Hungarian noble in the Principality of Transylvania, who served as Chancellor of Transylvania from Autumn 1594 to August 1598. He was the ancestor and first prominent member of the Baron Jósika de Branyicska family.

== Biography ==
His Romanian origin is mentioned by Giovanni de Marini Poli (the agent of Emperor Rudolf) in 1595 ("di natione Vallacha”), by Cosimo Capponi in 1596 ("è pure un povero Valacho"), by István Szamosközy and by the Franciscan friar Giuseppe Pisculo. His father was Dániel Jósika de Karánsebes, who functioned as vice-ispán of Szörény County. István had five siblings. He married Borbála Füzy (widow of Pál Gyulai) in 1593, they had a son, Zsigmond. He mastered Romanian, Hungarian, Italian and Latin.

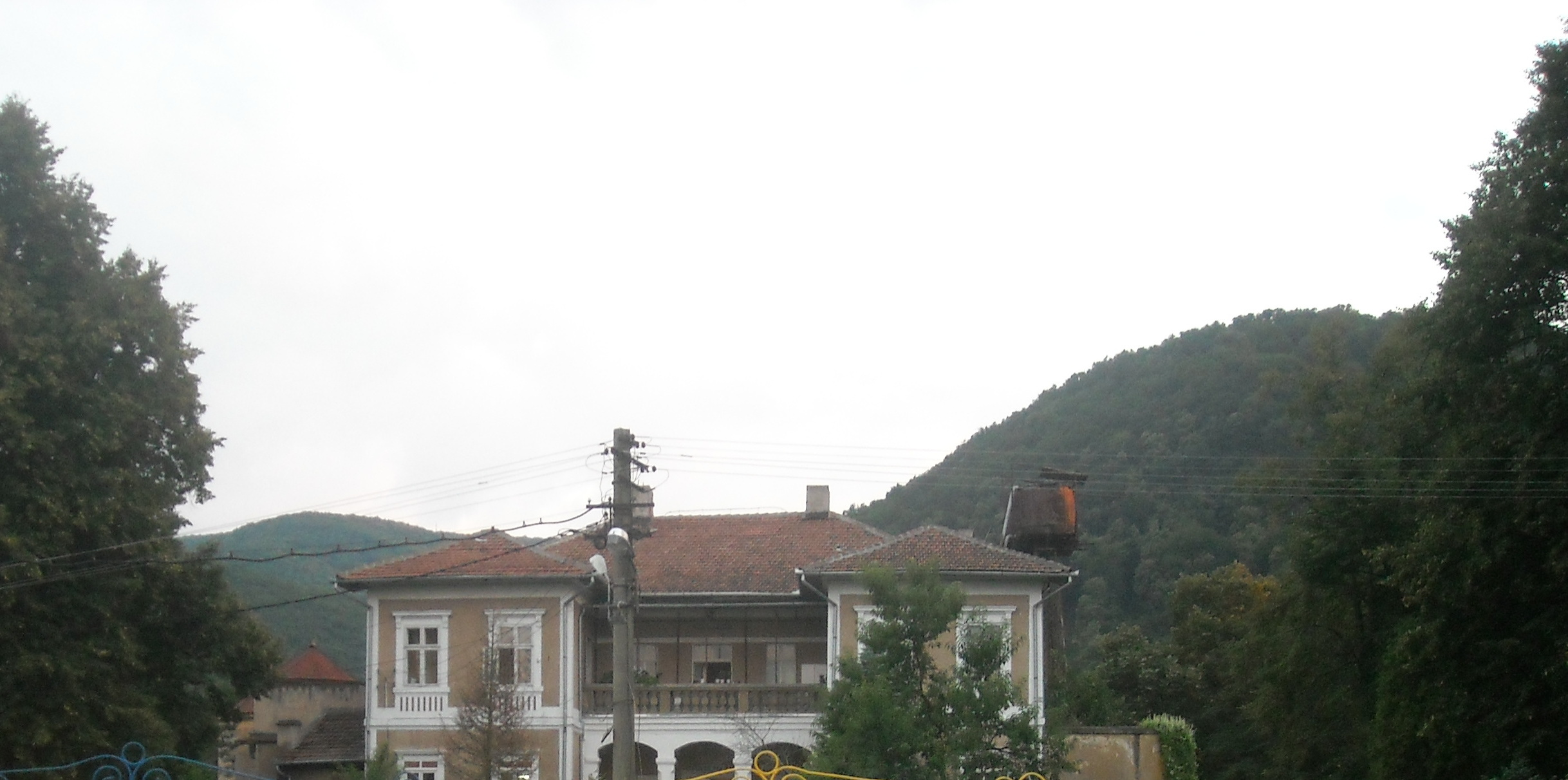
Jósika Castle, Brănișca (Branyicska)

Jósika raised among the Transylvanian aristocrats, because his wife was related to the Báthory family. István became founder of his family's property. In 1585, he became a secretary for the Chancellery. After the death of Farkas Kovacsóczy, he was appointed Chancellor of Transylvania (suppremus cancelarius) by Prince Sigismund Báthory. The monarch donated the confiscated estates of László Szalánczi to Jósika, like Zsidóvár (today: Jdioara, Romania) and Branyicska (today: Brănișca, Romania). He took his title of nobility from the latter village's name. He was also promoted to the rank of Baron, after that his family belonged to the Hungarian nobility. According to historian István Szamosközy, Jósika was responsible for the execution of his predecessor, because he wanted Kovacsóczy's office.

He was mentioned as Captain General in September 1597. He besieged Temesvár (today: Timișoara, Romania) on 17 October 1597, but he was forced to retire ten days later. Jósika was a trusted man of Báthory, the prince often sent him to Italy and Prague as his envoy. He also negotiated with Emperor Rudolf.

When the Holy Roman Emperor became Prince of Transylvania after series of conflicts and abdication of Báthory, he appointed Archduchess Maria Christina (wife of Sigismund Báthory) as his Regent. Jósika also held the position of Chancellor. However he became advocate of the pro-Ottoman politics in Transylvania. His activity revealed. He was arrested and imprisoned on 4 April 1598. Sigismund Báthory returned to Transylvania and marched into Kolozsvár (today: Cluj-Napoca, Romania) to retake his throne. The prince accused him to want to obtain the power, as a result he was decapitated without judgement before gate of the Szatmár Castle.

== Legacy ==
His widow married to Zsigmond Sármasági. Jósika's possessions were confiscated, but later his son, Zsigmond, regained them. His life inspired the novel of his descendant, Miklós Jósika (Jósika István I-V, Pest, 1847).

== Sources ==
- Markó, László: A magyar állam főméltóságai Szent Istvántól napjainkig – Életrajzi Lexikon p. 110. (The High Officers of the Hungarian State from Saint Stephen to the Present Days – A Biographical Encyclopedia) (2nd edition); Helikon Kiadó Kft., 2006, Budapest; ISBN 963-547-085-1.
- Trócsányi, Zsolt: Erdély központi kormányzata 1540–1690. Budapest, Akadémiai Kiadó, 1980. p. 28., p. 48. ISBN 963 05 2327 2

Political offices
Preceded by Farkas Kovacsóczy	Chancellor of Transylvania; 1594–1598	Succeeded by Demeter Naprágyi
