= János Ghyczy =

Hungarian noble

Governor of Transylvania
- In office 1 May 1585 – 17 December 1588
- Monarchs: Stephen Báthory; Sigismund Báthory
- Preceded by: Sándor Kendi; Farkas Kovacsóczy; László Sombori
- Succeeded by: Sigismund Báthory (as Prince)

Personal details
- Born: c. 1520
- Died: 7 January 1589 Gyulafehérvár, Principality of Transylvania (today: Alba Iulia, Romania)
- Spouse: Zsuzsanna Válkai

János Ghyczy de Ghicz, Assakürt et Ablánczkürt (c. 1520 – 7 January 1589) was a Hungarian noble in the Principality of Transylvania, member of the Royal Council, who served as Governor of Transylvania for the underage voivode then prince Sigismund Báthory from 1 May 1585 to 17 December 1588.

== Life ==
He was born around 1520 as the sixth and youngest child of Lénárt Ghyczy and Sára Waghy. He married Anna Káthay.

He served in Kapuvár as familiaris of Tamás Nádasdy in 1558. Two years later he moved to Érsekújvár (today: Nové Zámky, Slovakia) serving besides his brother, György and held the officiolatus of within the Archdiocese of Esztergom. He entered the royal service in 1562. he became cavalry lieutenant with 26 horses in the Castle of Gyula in 1564. In the next year he fought against the united Transylvanian-Ottoman Army, led by John Sigismund Zápolya and Pasha Hassan, alongside the garrison of Gyula and Lazarus von Schwendi's army. He seriously wounded from a lance.

He defended Gyula which besieged by the troops of Pasha Pertaf in July 1566. After the fall of the castle (September) he survived the massacres and fled to Transylvania. He entered into the service of Prince John Sigismund Zápolya who gave him Csókfalva (today part of Ghindari, Romania) and Bede (today: Bedeni, Romania) in Marosszék (later: Maros-Torda County). After that he was a confidential follower of Stephen Báthory since 1571, he received vast estates for his services.

Ghyczy served as Captain General of Várad from 1576 to 1585. After that he was appointed Governor of Transylvania besides the underage Sigismund Báthory. He was also a member of the Royal Council between 1585 and 1589. During the Diet of Spring 1587, the cousin of the young prince, Stephen Báthory de Somlyó intended to overthrow Ghyczy and take control of the country. However, the Ottoman Porte prevented the coup d'état of Báthory and confirmed Ghyczy in his position. He resigned due to illness in the Diet of Medgyes (today: Mediaș, Romania) in December 1588. He died soon afterwards. He was buried in the Gyulafehérvár Cathedral on 21 January 1589.

== Sources ==
- Markó, László: A magyar állam főméltóságai Szent Istvántól napjainkig – Életrajzi Lexikon pp. 107–108. (The High Officers of the Hungarian State from Saint Stephen to the Present Days – A Biographical Encyclopedia) (2nd edition); Helikon Kiadó Kft., 2006, Budapest; ISBN 963-547-085-1.

Political offices
Preceded by Sándor Kendi; Farkas Kovacsóczy; László Sombori	Governor of Transylvania; 1585–1588	Succeeded by Sigismund Báthory as Prince
