= Sándor Kendi =

Romanian politician

Governor of Transylvania along with Farkas Kovacsóczy and László Sombori
- In office 6 March 1583 – 1 May 1585
- Monarchs: Stephen Báthory voivode: Sigismund Báthory
- Preceded by: Council of Twelve
- Succeeded by: János Ghyczy

Personal details
- Died: August 30, 1594 Kolozsvár, Principality of Transylvania (today: Cluj-Napoca, Romania)
- Spouse(s): Klára Patóchi; Anna Almádi
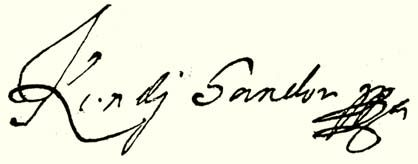
- Signature

Sándor Kendi de Szarvaskend (Kendy; ? – 30 August 1594) was a Hungarian noble in the Principality of Transylvania, member of the Royal Council, who served as Governor of Transylvania for the underage voivode Sigismund Báthory from 6 March 1583 to 1 May 1585.

== Family ==
His father was Mihály Kendi, brother of voivode Ferenc Kendi and Antal Kendi who were executed by Isabella Jagiellon in 1558. His mother was Mihály's first (Zsófia Szilvásy) or second wife (Katalin Bánffy).

Sándor Kendi married twice: his wives were Klára Patóchi and Anna Almádi. He had four children:

- Zsuzsanna, her first husband was Balthasar Báthory
- Krisztina, her second husband was Farkas Kovacsóczy
- Zsófia
- István, Chancellor of Transylvania (1608–1610), probably he was the last male member of the Kendi family.

== Career ==
He started his work at the Transylvanian Chancellery in 1565. He became secretary of the Chancellery in 1568. He served as envoy of John Sigismund Zápolya to Emperor Maximilian I from 1570 to 1572. The Emperor arrested him and refused to return for a year. Returning to home he became a supporter of Prince Stephen Báthory. Ha made several contacts with the Ottoman Porte since 1572, during the uprisings of Gáspár Bekes.

Kendi was appointed a member of the Royal Council in 1573. He held that position until his execution. He served as Lord Lieutenant (Count; comes) Inner Szolnok County between 1578 and 1591. He also functioned as Treasurer along with János Gálffy from 1578 to 1581. Stephen Báthory dissolved the Council of Twelve and established a three-member Regent Council besides the underage Sigismund Báthory, Voivode of Transylvania since 1581. Sándor Kendi was appointed Governor along with his son-in-law, Farkas Kovacsóczy and László Sombori, who also member of the Royal Council.

After the resignation of Governor János Ghyczy (1588) he was elected councilor besides the older Sigismund Báthory however the new prince did not accept that and overshadowed him. Kendi retired from the politics for a time.

He openly opposed the foreign policy of Sigismund in 1594 who turned against the Turks, his overlord. Kendi considered dangerous for the independence of Transylvania that Sigismund allied with the Habsburg-dominated Kingdom of Hungary. Later his fears came true. He clarified his standpoint at the Transylvanian Diet on 17 August 1594, but the majority opted for turning against the Ottoman Empire. The prince enraged for his group's activities in the field as a result Kendi, among others, was arrested. Later the opposition magnates were executed without any trial, including Sándor Kendi, his brother Ferenc Kendi, his cousin Gábor Kendi (son of the late Antal Kendi), Balthasar Báthory (cousin of the prince) and Farkas Kovacsóczy.

== Sources ==
- Markó, László: A magyar állam főméltóságai Szent Istvántól napjainkig – Életrajzi Lexikon p. 113. (The High Officers of the Hungarian State from Saint Stephen to the Present Days – A Biographical Encyclopedia) (2nd edition); Helikon Kiadó Kft., 2006, Budapest; ISBN 963-547-085-1.
- Trócsányi, Zsolt: Erdély központi kormányzata 1540–1690. Budapest, Akadémiai Kiadó, 1980. p. 106.' ISBN 963 05 2327 2

Political offices
Preceded by Council of Twelve (1581–1583)	Governor of Transylvania along with Farkas Kovacsóczy and László Sombori; 1583–1585	Succeeded by János Ghyczy (1585–1588)
