= Bloody Carnival =

1596 massacre of Székely serfs

The Bloody Carnival (Hungarian: véres farsang) was the massacre of Székely serfs in February 1596 after their rebellion for the restoration of their freedom. The Székelys rose up because the Diet of Transylvania had refused to restore their freedom. Sigismund Báthory, Prince of Transylvania promised them to restore their freedom if they joined his campaign against the Ottomans in Wallachia in autumn 1595.

== Sources ==
- Barta, Gábor (1994). "The Emergence of the Principality and its First Crises (1526–1606)". In Köpeczi, Béla; Barta, Gábor; Bóna, István; Makkai, László; Szász, Zoltán; Borus, Judit (eds.). History of Transylvania. Akadémiai Kiadó. pp. 247–300. ISBN 963-05-6703-2.
- G. Etényi, Nóra; Horn, Ildikó; Szabó, Péter (2006). Koronás fejedelem: Bocskai István és kora [A Crowned Prince: Stephen Bocskai and his Times] (in Hungarian). General Press Kiadó. ISBN 963-9648-27-2.
