= Farkas Kovacsóczy =

Hungarian politician

Chancellor of Transylvania
- In office 1578 – 28 August 1594
- Monarchs: Stephen Báthory; Sigismund Báthory
- Preceded by: Imre Sulyok
- Succeeded by: István Jósika

Personal details
- Born: c. 1540
- Died: 11 September 1594 Szamosújvár, Principality of Transylvania (today: Gherla, Romania)
- Spouse(s): Kata Farkas; Krisztina Kendi

Farkas Kovacsóczy de Körtvélyfa (c. 1540 – 11 September 1594) was a Hungarian noble in the Principality of Transylvania, who served as Chancellor of Transylvania from Summer 1578 to 28 August 1594. His son, István later became Chancellor too.

== Family ==
Kovacsóczy was born into a Transylvanian noble family of Slavonic origin. His parents were János Kovacsóczy, who fled from Slavonia due to the Ottoman invasion, and Erzsébet Török de Buda. He had two siblings.

He married Kata Farkas de Harina first in 1581, three sons (including István) and two daughters were born. He married for the second time to Krisztina Kendi de Szarvaskend, they had no children. His father-in-law was Sándor Kendi, a member of the Transylvanian Royal Council and father of István Kendi, who was elected Chancellor in 1608.

== Career ==
Between 1572 and 1573, he studied in France and at the University of Padua. He finished his studies there along with Stephen Báthory, who later became Prince of Transylvania and King of Poland. Kovacsóczy was a prominent counselor of his starting in 1571.

He accompanied the prince to Poland in 1576, where he served as secretary for the Transylvanian affairs at the Royal Chancellery in Kraków. He returned home in 1578 and was appointed Chancellor beside voivode Christopher Báthory, who took on state affairs on behalf of his brother. Christopher died in 1581 and was succeeded by his son, Sigismund Báthory in the office of the Voivode. Stephen Báthory established a three-member Regent Council beside the underage Sigismund. Between 1583 and 1585, Kovacsóczy served on that council, along with his future father-in-law Sándor Kendi and László Sombori.

Kovacsóczy participated in the royal election of 1587 in Poland as envoy of the Prince of Transylvania. In 1594, he strongly opposed the turn against the Ottomans and the alliance with the Habsburg Empire, along with Balthasar Báthory, cousin of prince Sigismund, and Sándor Kendi. He considered Sigismund's decision dangerous. As a result, the opposition magnate was arrested by the prince. Farkas Kovacsóczy was strangled to death in the prison of Szamosújvár (today: Gherla, Romania) on 11 September 1594.

== Works ==
- De administratione Transylvaniae (The administration of Transylvania; 1584)

== Sources ==
- Markó, László: A magyar állam főméltóságai Szent Istvántól napjainkig – Életrajzi Lexikon p. 113. (The High Officers of the Hungarian State from Saint Stephen to the Present Days – A Biographical Encyclopedia) (2nd edition); Helikon Kiadó Kft., 2006, Budapest; ISBN 963-547-085-1.
- Trócsányi, Zsolt: Erdély központi kormányzata 1540–1690. Budapest, Akadémiai Kiadó, 1980. ISBN 963 05 2327 2

Political offices
Preceded by Imre Sulyok	Chancellor of Transylvania; 1578–1594	Succeeded by István Jósika
Preceded by Council of Twelve (1581–1583)	Governor of Transylvania along with Sándor Kendi and László Sombori; 1583–1585	Succeeded by János Ghyczy (1585–1588)
