= László Sombori =

Hungarian noble

Governor of Transylvania along with Farkas Kovacsóczy and Sándor Kendi
- In office 6 March 1583 – 1 May 1585
- Monarchs: Stephen Báthory voivode: Sigismund Báthory
- Preceded by: Council of Twelve
- Succeeded by: János Ghyczy

Personal details
- Died: September 1590
- Spouse: Zsuzsanna Válkai

László Sombori or Sombory ( ? – September 1590) was a Hungarian noble in the Principality of Transylvania, member of the Royal Council, who served as Governor of Transylvania for the underage voivode Sigismund Báthory (along with Sándor Kendi and Farkas Kovacsóczy) from 6 March 1583 to 1 May 1585.

== Sources ==
- Markó, László: A magyar állam főméltóságai Szent Istvántól napjainkig – Életrajzi Lexikon pp. 123–124. (The High Officers of the Hungarian State from Saint Stephen to the Present Days – A Biographical Encyclopedia) (2nd edition); Helikon Kiadó Kft., 2006, Budapest; ISBN 963-547-085-1.

Political offices
Preceded by Council of Twelve (1581–1583)	Governor of Transylvania along with Farkas Kovacsóczy and Sándor Kendi; 1583–1585	Succeeded by János Ghyczy (1585–1588)
