= Edict of Torda =

Religious decree in early modern Europe in 1568

The Edict of Torda (Hungarian: tordai ediktum, Romanian: Edictul de la Turda, German: Edikt von Torda) was a decree that authorized local communities to freely elect their preachers in the Eastern Hungarian Kingdom of John Sigismund Zápolya. The delegates of the Three Nations of Transylvania – the Hungarian nobles, Transylvanian Saxons, and Székelys – adopted it at the request of the monarch's Antitrinitarian court preacher, Ferenc Dávid, in Torda (Romanian: Turda, German: Thorenburg) on 28 January 1568. Though it did not acknowledge an individual's right to religious freedom, in sanctioning the existence of a radical Christian religion in a European state, the decree was an unprecedented act of religious tolerance.

The Catholic and Eastern Orthodox churches had coexisted in the southern and eastern territories of the medieval Kingdom of Hungary for centuries. However, ideas that the Catholic Church regarded as heresy were not tolerated: the Hungarian Hussites were expelled from the country in the 1430s and the 1523 Diet of Hungary passed a decree that ordered the persecution of Lutherans. The latter decree was in practice ignored during the civil war that followed the Ottoman victory against the Hungarian army in the Battle of Mohács in 1526. After the Ottomans occupied the central regions of the medieval kingdom in 1541, they allowed the infant John Sigismund to rule the lands to the east of the river Tisza under the regency of his mother, Isabella Jagiellon. In the early 1540s the Diets acknowledged the right of the Three Nations to freely regulate their internal affairs. The Saxons regarded religion as an internal affair and ordered the introduction of the Lutheran Reformation in their settlements in 1544–1545. The Diet sanctioned the coexistence of the Catholic and Lutheran denominations only in 1557.

John Sigismund started to rule personally after his mother died in 1559. He was interested in religious affairs and organized a series of debates between the representatives of the different Protestant theologies. He converted from Catholicism to Lutheranism in 1562, and from Lutheranism to Calvinism in 1564. His court physician, Giorgio Biandrata, and Ferenc Dávid jointly persuaded him to also allow the public discussion of the doctrine of the Trinity. Sigismund accepted Dávid and Biandrata's Antitrinitarian views in 1567. The Edict of Torda was adopted at the following Diet. It stated that "faith is the gift of God" and prohibited the persecution of individuals on religious grounds. In practice, the edict only sanctioned the existence of four "received" denominations – the Catholic, Lutheran, Calvinist, and Unitarian Churches. Further religious innovations were prohibited during the reign of John Sigismund's successor, Stephen Báthory, but religious tolerance remained a distinguishing feature of the Principality of Transylvania (the successor state to John Sigismund's realm) in Early modern Europe.

== Background ==
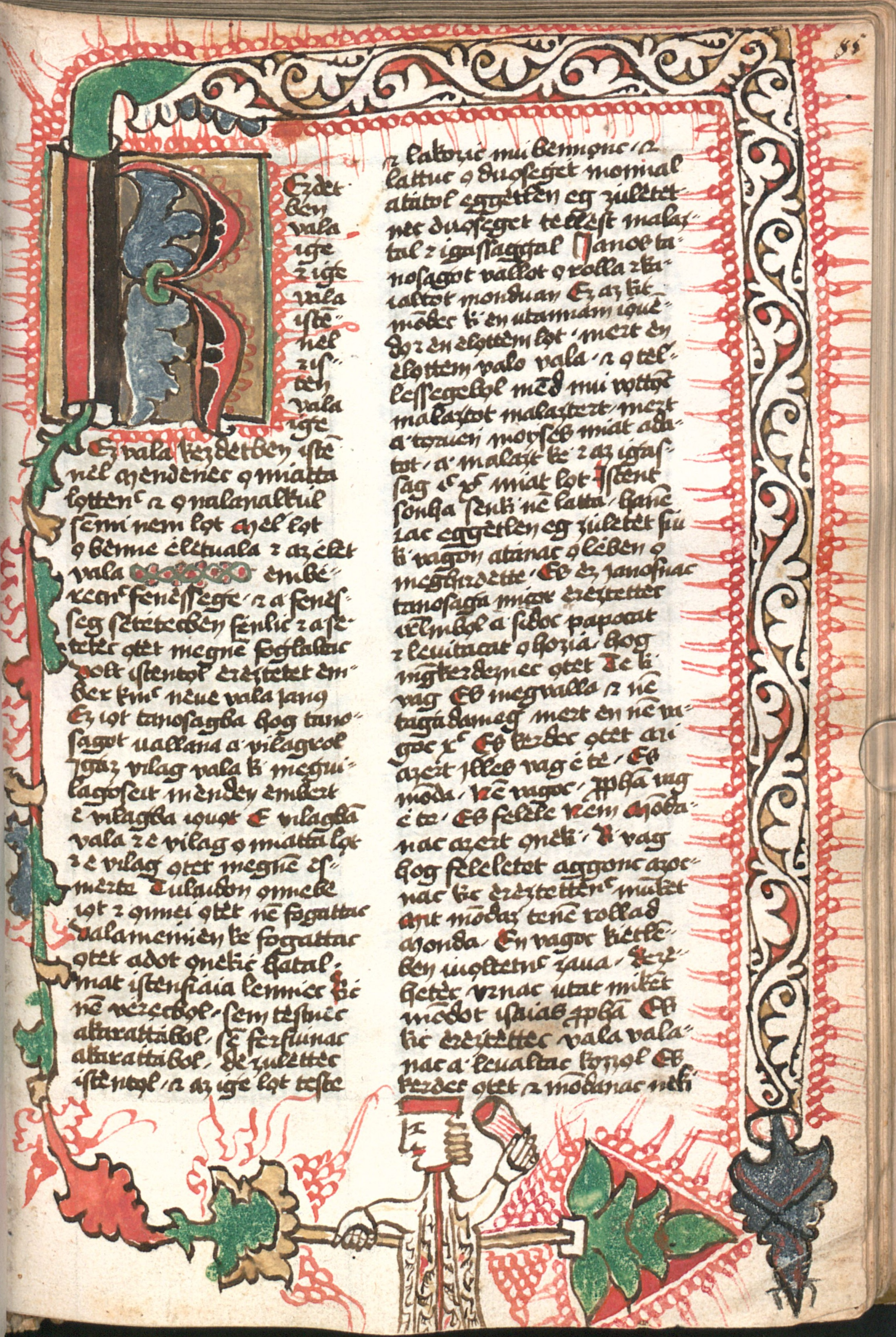
Page from the Munich Codex of the first Hungarian translation of the Bible

The Catholic Church was facing a profound crisis in the Kingdom of Hungary at the end of the Middle Ages. Ideas that the Catholic Church regarded as heretical appeared in the late 14th century, primarily in the small towns. In the 1430s, young burghers who had studied at the University of Prague began teaching the theology of the Czech Jan Hus, despite his having been condemned to death for heresy at the Council of Constance. Two Hussite preachers completed the first Hungarian translation of the Bible in the early 1430s. Pope Eugene IV appointed the Franciscan James of the Marches to eradicate Hussitism in Hungary in 1436. The Hussites who survived the purge fled to Moldavia in 1439.

German burghers of Upper Hungary (now mostly in Slovakia) were the first to adopt Martin Luther's views in the early 1520s. Dozens of the German courtiers of Mary of Habsburg (the wife of Louis II of Hungary) also supported the ideas of the Reformation. However, the Hungarian noblemen remained hostile towards Lutheran theology, primarily because they wanted to secure the support of the Holy See against the Ottoman Empire. On 24 April 1523, the Diet of Hungary passed a decree that ordered the persecution and execution of Luther's followers in the entire kingdom.

The Ottoman Sultan Suleiman the Magnificent annihilated the Hungarian army in the Battle of Mohács in 1526. Louis II drowned in a nearby stream while fleeing from the battlefield. The majority of the Hungarian noblemen elected as king one of their number, John Zápolya, but the most powerful noblemen proclaimed Louis II's brother-in-law, Ferdinand of Habsburg, the lawful monarch, leading to a civil war that lasted nearly two decades.

Ferdinand and John reached a compromise in 1538. Each acknowledged the other's right to rule, but they also agreed that the kingdom was to be reunited under the rule of the one who survived the other. However, the childless John married Isabella Jagiellon, who gave birth to a son, John Sigismund, in 1540. Two weeks later, John died, but only after persuading his supporters to pledge that they would secure his infant son's rule. Keeping their word, they elected John Sigismund king in Buda in clear contradiction to the 1538 compromise. The royal election provoked a new invasion by Ferdinand's troops.

Taking advantage of the new conflict, Suleiman again invaded Hungary in 1541. He occupied the central region, but confirmed John Sigismund's rule in the lands to the east of the river Tisza as his vassal, creating an Eastern Hungarian Kingdom. The Estates of John Sigismund's realm acknowledged the situation and swore fealty to the child king and his mother.

== Towards tolerance ==
The Kingdom of Hungary, especially its eastern territory, had been a borderland between the Catholic and Eastern Orthodox churches. The two churches co-existed without major conflicts, although the monarchs occasionally took (mostly marginal) measures against Eastern Orthodox believers in the 14th century. Eastern Orthodox lords established Basilite monasteries in the southern and northeastern regions; Eastern Orthodox bishops residing in Transylvanian monasteries were documented from the late 14th century.

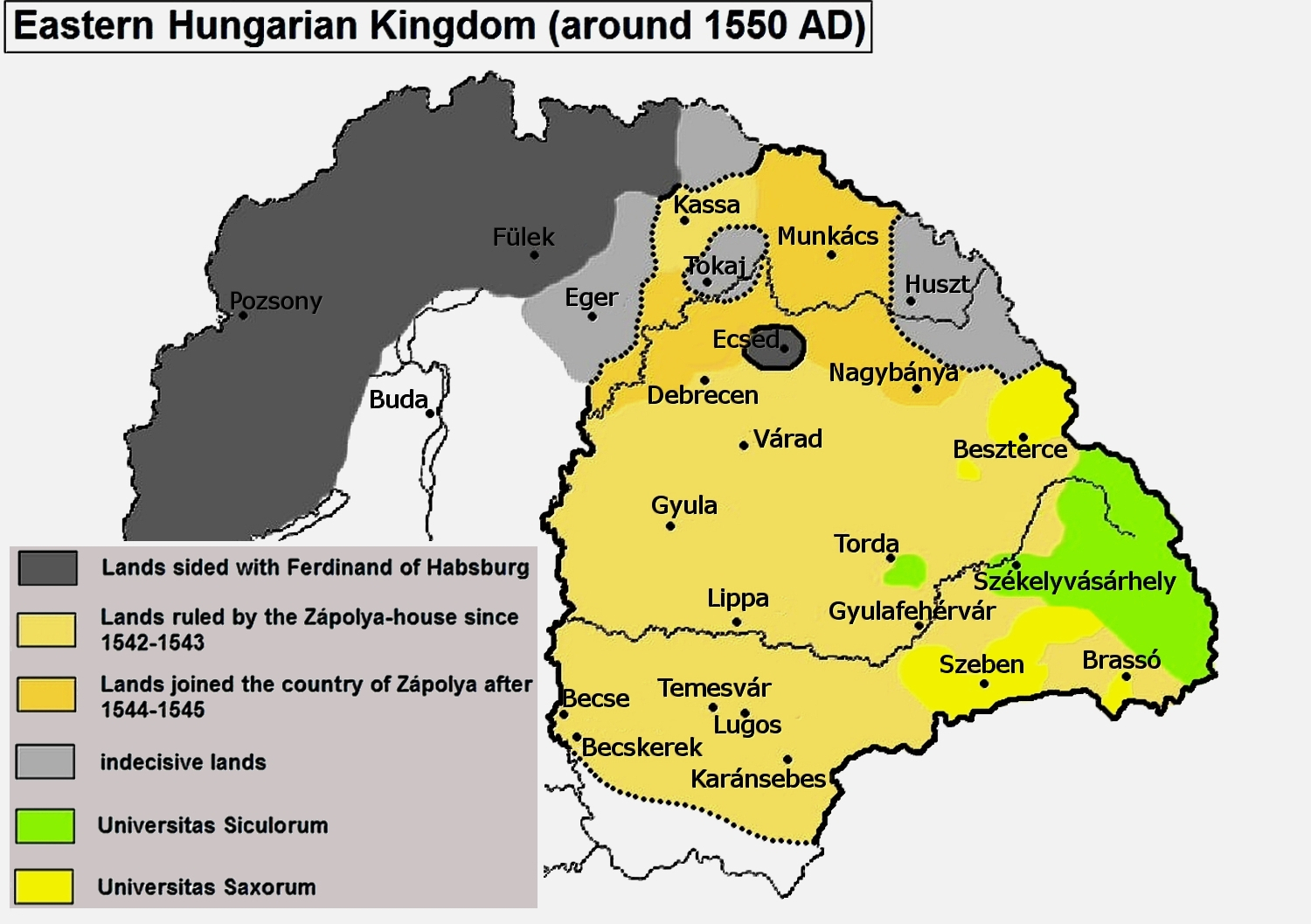
John Sigismund's realm around 1550

The civil war that followed the Battle of Mohács made the enforcement of anti-Lutheran legislation difficult after 1526. The popular interpretation of the Ottomans' victory at Mohács as a sign of the wrath of God facilitated the spread of the ideas of the Reformation. John Zápolya became especially reluctant to persecute the Lutherans after the Pope excommunicated him for his alliance with the Ottomans in 1529. He organized a public debate between Catholic prelates and a Lutheran preacher in Schässburg (Romanian: Sighișoara, Hungarian: Segesvár) in 1538.

Between 1541 and 1545, the Diets (or legislative assemblies) in the eastern Hungarian Kingdom re-affirmed the agreement that the Hungarian noblemen, Transylvanian Saxons, and Székelys had signed during the Transylvanian peasant revolt in 1437, making this "Union of the Three Nations" a fundamental law. The Diets decreed that each nation could freely regulate its internal affairs at its own assemblies. The Saxons regarded religious issues as an internal affair, and their general assembly ordered the introduction of the Reformation in their towns and villages in 1544–1545. Lutheran ideas also spread among the noblemen from the 1540s. Twenty-nine Hungarian preachers from the region of Várad (Romanian: Oradea, German: Großwardein) adopted a creed similar to the Augsburg Confession at their synod in Erdőd (Romanian: Ardud, German: Erdeed) in 1545.

The Ottoman authorities always acknowledged the co-existence of multiple monotheist religions in line with Islamic traditions, although Christians and Jews were obliged to pay a special tax, known as jizya, in the Ottoman Empire. In 1548 the Ottoman pasha (or governor) of Buda forbade the Catholic authorities of Tolna to persecute the local Lutheran preacher, stating that all locals "should be able to listen to and receive the word of God without any danger". Historian Susan J. Ritchie says that the pasha's order may have influenced the Edict of Torda, although "no direct evidence exists" that the compilers of the edict knew of the order.

Isabella was forced to surrender her son's realm to Ferdinand of Habsburg in 1551. In the same year, the Lutheran members of the town council of Debrecen accused the town pastor, Márton Kálmáncsehi, of heresy because he denied the real presence of Christ in the Eucharist. He was forced to flee from the town, but the wealthy Péter Petrovics put him under his protection.

After Ferdinand of Habsburg proved unable to secure the defence of the eastern territories, the Diet persuaded Isabella and John Sigismund to return in 1556. Petrovics, who had always been their principal supporter, soon initiated new religious debates between Lutheran and Calvinist clergymen. In 1557 the Diet passed a decree that historian Krista Zach describes as "the founding document of the so-called religious tolerance" in John Sigismund's realm. Actually, the decree only acknowledged the existence of a separate Lutheran Church, urging the Catholic and Lutheran believers to avoid violent acts against each other. In the same year, Hungarian clerics of the region of Várad confirmed their adherence to the Calvinist view of the Eucharist, for which the Lutherans labelled them "Sacramentarians". The following Diet confirmed the decree that had been passed in 1557, but it also outlawed the Sacramentarians in 1558.

Because we and our noble son, in response to the ardent pleading of the land's [E]states, have decided that everyone may keep the faith he desires, including the new and the old customs of worship, we have left matters of faith to their discretion, so that it may happen as it pleases [the Estates]. In this matter, however, no injustice shall be done to anyone.

— Decree of the Diet of 1557

== John Sigismund, Dávid and Biandrata ==
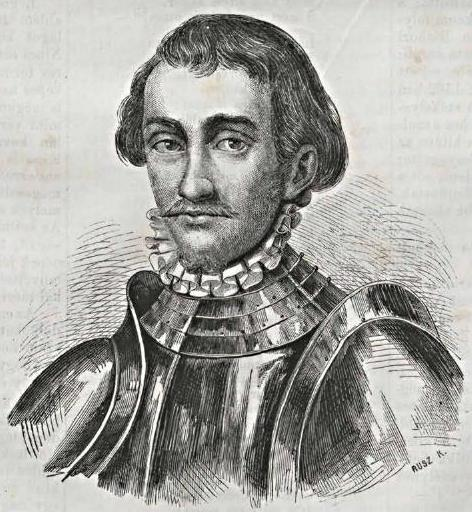
John Sigismund's portrait by Károly Rusz

John Sigismund became the actual ruler of the Eastern Hungarian Kingdom after the death of his mother on 15 November 1559. He had grown up as a Catholic, but he was curious about theological issues. He organized new religious debates between representatives of the Lutheran and Calvinist theologies in Mediasch (Romanian: Mediaș, Hungarian: Medgyes) in January 1560 and February 1561. His Lutheran chancellor, Mihály Csáky, persuaded him to order the two parties to summarize their views in writing. The summaries were sent for review to Wittenberg, Leipzig, and two other centers of theological studies in the Holy Roman Empire. The four German academies responded in early 1562, and their opinions were taken into account when the synod of the Lutheran clergy adopted a new creed in the same year. John Sigismund soon converted from Catholicism to Lutheranism.

A clergyman from Kolozsvár (Romanian: Cluj, German: Klausenburg), Ferenc Dávid, had meanwhile become a key figure in the development of Protestant ideas in John Sigismund's realm. Historian István Keul says Dávid's career displays his extraordinary "denominational flexibility". He was elected the superintendent of the Church of the Hungarian Lutherans in 1557. He made attempts to reconcile the Lutheran and Calvinist clerics, but their views of the Eucharist were incompatible. Dávid's studies of the works of Erasmus of Rotterdam and Michael Servetus contributed to his critical attitude towards dogmas and the development of his conviction of the free choice of religion.

In the early 16th century Erasmus had urged commoners to regularly read the Bible. While producing his own critical edition of the Bible, Erasmus realized the Johannine comma, a brief aside which had previously been regarded as the principal evidence for the doctrine of the Trinity, did not exist in any of the oldest Greek manuscripts of the Bible, meaning it had been inserted later by scribes. Servetus read the critical studies of Joseph Kimhi and other Jewish scholars about the Trinity, and concluded that this dogma was the principal doctrine that separated Christianity from Judaism and Islam. He was forced to leave his native Spain for his Antitrinitarian views. He was executed with John Calvin's consent in Geneva in 1553.

Dávid was elected the superintendent of the newly formed Reformed Diocese of Transylvania, which adhered to Calvin's theology, in 1564. In the same year, John Sigismund converted from Lutheranism to Calvinism and made Dávid his court preacher. The Diet also acknowledged the existence of a separate Calvinist Church. Two years later the Diet made a Romanian Calvinist pastor, Gheorghe of Sîngeorgiu, the head of the Church of the Romanians. The Diet also ordered the expulsion of the Eastern Orthodox clerics who were unwilling to adhere to Calvinism, but the decree was never implemented.

John Sigismund made the Italian Giorgio Biandrata his court physician in 1563. Biandrata had questioned the deity of Jesus Christ in the late 1550s, for which Calvin regarded him as a "monster". Under Biandrata's influence, Dávid adopted an Antitrinitarian theology in 1565. Péter Melius Juhász, the Calvinist bishop of Debrecen, sharply criticized him, but the most influential burghers of Kolozsvár remained Dávid's staunch supporters. They prohibited the preaching of doctrines that differed from his views.

John Sigismund initially supported Juhász, but his Antitrinitarian court physician strongly influenced him. He did not prevent Biandrata and Dávid from holding a synod in early 1567. The synod adopted an Antitrinitarian creed, declaring that God the Father was the single God. Gáspár Heltai, Péter Károlyi, and other Calvinist priests left Kolozsvár, but more and more Hungarian noblemen and burghers were willing to accept Dávid's views. Melius Juhász held a synod at Debrecen that adopted a Trinitarian creed. His supporters demanded that Dávid should be stoned for his heresy.

== The edict ==
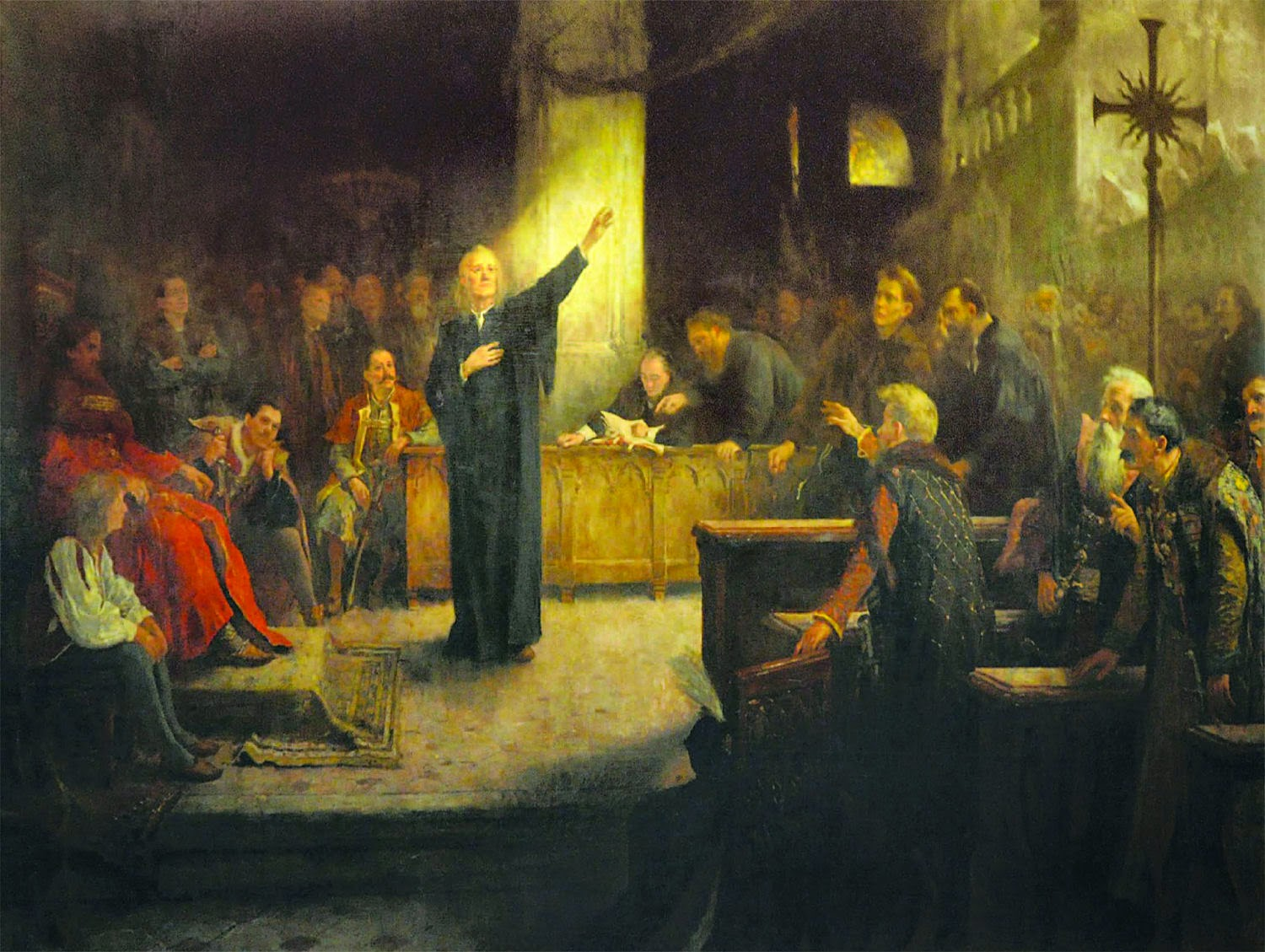
The Diet of Torda, an 1896 painting by Aladár Körösfői-Kriesch

Dávid published a series of books in Latin and Hungarian to defend his views in 1567 and 1568. His first Hungarian book, entitled A Short Explanation of How the Antichrist Beclouded the Knowledge of the True God, states that the abandonment of the doctrine of the Trinity is required to secure the realization of the Kingdom of God. He emphasizes that no peasant can receive salvation if that requires an understanding of theological terms such as person and substance, stating that a peasant "is unable [to] understand them in his entire life". To defend the idea of religious freedom, he quotes Gamaliel's advice about the imprisoned Apostles to the judges of the Sanhedrin from the Acts of the Apostles: Gamaliel suggests that the Apostles should be released without a punishment because if their work is "of human origin, it will fail", but if their work "is of God", the judges "will not be able to stop" the Apostles. Dávid also refers to the Parable of the Tares, in which Jesus states that tares that appear in a field of wheat should only be gathered up and burnt at the harvest.

Biandrata and Dávid convinced John Sigismund to accept their Antitrinitarian theology by the end of 1567. The king convoked a Diet, which assembled in Torda (Romanian: Turda, German: Thorenburg) on 6 January 1568. At Dávid's fervent demand, the delegates of the Three Nations confirmed on 28 January the toleration edicts that had been adopted in 1557 and 1563. A new edict was passed that ensured that both Anti-Trinitarian and Trinitarian theologies could be freely preached in the country. Repeating a text from the eighth verse of the second chapter of the Epistle to the Ephesians, the edict declares that "faith is the gift of God". The edict also refers to the seventeenth verse of the tenth chapter of the Epistle to the Romans, stating that faith "comes from hearing the message, and the message is heard through the word about Christ". The edict forbids people from mistreating each other on religious grounds.

His Majesty, our Lord, in whatever manner he—together with his realm [i.e. the Diet]—legislated in the matter of religion at the previous Diets, in the same manner now, in this Diet, he reaffirms that in every place the preachers shall preach and explain the Gospel each according to his understanding of it, and if the congregation like it, well, if not, no one shall compel them for their souls would not be satisfied, but they shall be permitted to keep a preacher whose teaching they approve. Therefore none of the superintendents or others shall abuse the preachers, no one shall be reviled for his religion by anyone, according to the previous statutes, and it is not permitted that anyone should threaten anyone else by imprisonment or by removal from his post for his teaching, for faith is the gift of God, this comes from hearing, which hearing is by the word of God.

— Edict of Torda

The Edict of Torda does not acknowledge the individuals' right to religious freedom. Instead, it emphasizes the local communities' right to freely choose their pastors. Furthermore, it does not cover the Eastern Orthodox Romanians, the Jews, and the Muslims. Nevertheless, the Edict of Torda was an extraordinary achievement of religious tolerance by the standards of 16th-century Europe. It was the first law to officially sanction the existence of a radical – Antitrinitarian – Christian community in a European state. A series of religious debates between the representatives of Trinitarian and Antitrinitarian views followed the adoption of the edict. John Sigismund was biased towards the Antitrinitarian preachers, but on 25 October 1569 he stated that religion could always be freely discussed in his realm.

== Afterwards ==
John Sigismund died on 14 March 1571. He had already renounced the title of king of Hungary and begun styling himself as prince of Transylvania. The Diet elected the powerful Roman Catholic nobleman, Stephen Báthory, voivode (or ruler) of Transylvania. Although decrees prohibited clergymen from attacking the priests of another religion for their teaching, Báthory urged the Saxon preachers to condemn Calvinist and Antitrinitarian theologies. The Saxons did not obey his demand.

Báthory also wanted to stop the spread of the Reformation among the Romanians in Transylvania. He made an Eastern Orthodox monk from Moldavia, Eftimie, their bishop on 5 October 1571, but without restricting the activities of the Calvinist superintendent of the Romanians. The Diet urged Báthory to respect the decrees that had been adopted regarding the Church of the Romanians during John Sigismund's reign, but the Serbian Patriarch of Peć ordained Eftimie bishop in 1572 with Báthory's consent. The Diet passed a new decree that prohibited religious innovations in May 1572. The decree authorized the prince to initiate investigations together with the competent church authorities against those who broke the law.

Dávid continued to preach new ideas, which brought him into conflict with Biandrata. Dávid rejected infant baptism and rejected the adoration of Christ, for which he was imprisoned in 1579. Nevertheless, religious tolerance remained a distinctive feature of the Principality of Transylvania. In 1588 the Diet even decreed that serfs could not be forced to convert to their lords' faith. The co-existence of the four received (or officially recognized) denominations – the Trinitarian Roman Catholic, Lutheran, Calvinist, and the Antitrinitarian Unitarian Churches – was not questioned.

The Eastern Orthodox Church was not regarded as a received religion, but its existence was also officially recognized. Gabriel Báthory, who ruled from 1608 to 1613, exempted the Eastern Orthodox priests from all feudal obligations and secured their right to free movement. His successor, Gabriel Bethlen, confirmed this decree in 1614. He also allowed the Jesuits to return to Transylvania and settled about 200 Anabaptist Hutterites (who were persecuted in all of Europe) in the principality. He also granted special privileges to the Jews, including relieving them of the requirement of wearing the Star of David or other distinctive signs.

The Edict of Torda influenced legislation in the multi-religious Polish–Lithuanian Commonwealth. On 28 January 1573 the Sejm (or general assembly) passed the so-called Warsaw Confederation, which contained an article on religious freedom. The article remained in force until the middle of the 17th century.

== See also ==
- Edict of Milan
- Edict of toleration
- Letter of Majesty
- Pál Bornemissza

== Sources ==
- Barta, Gábor (1994). "The Emergence of the Principality and its First Crises (1526–1606)". In Köpeczi, Béla; Barta, Gábor; Bóna, István; Makkai, László; Szász, Zoltán; Borus, Judit (eds.). History of Transylvania. Akadémiai Kiadó. pp. 247–300. ISBN 963-05-6703-2.
- Cartledge, Bryan (2011). The Will to Survive: A History of Hungary. C. Hurst & Co. ISBN 978-1-84904-112-6.
- Daniel, David P. (1992). "Hungary". In Pettegree, Andrew (ed.). The early Reformation in Europe. Cambridge University Press. pp. 49–69. ISBN 0-521-39768-5.
- Engel, Pál (2001). The Realm of St Stephen: A History of Medieval Hungary, 895–1526. I.B. Tauris Publishers. ISBN 1-86064-061-3.
- Erdő, János (1993). "A tordai ediktum teológiai alapjai [The theological bases for the Edict of Torda]" (PDF). Keresztény Magvető (in Hungarian). 99 (1): 24–29. ISSN 1222-8370.
- Ghitta, Ovidiu (2009). "The Orthodox Church of Transylvania (The 16th century – the second half of the 17th century)". In Pop, Ioan-Aurel; Nägler, Thomas; Magyari, András (eds.). The History of Transylvania, Vol. II (From 1541 to 1711). Romanian Academy, Center for Transylvanian Studies. pp. 254–269. ISBN 978-973-7784-04-9.
- Harris, Mark W. (2009). The A to Z of Unitarian Universalism. Scarecrow Press. ISBN 978-0-8108-6817-5.
- Keul, István (2009). Early Modern Religious Communities in East-Central Europe: Ethnic Diversity, Denominational Plurality, and Corporative Politics in the Principality of Transylvania (1526–1691). Brill Publishers. ISBN 978-90-04-17652-2.
- Kontler, László (1999). Millennium in Central Europe: A History of Hungary. Atlantisz Publishing House. ISBN 963-9165-37-9.
- Lendvai, Paul (2003). The Hungarians: A Thousand Years of Victory in Defeat. Hurst & Company. ISBN 1-85065-682-7.
- MacCulloch, Diarmaid (2003). The Reformation: A History. Viking Press. ISBN 0-670-03296-4.
- Metzger, Bruce M. (1994). A Textual Commentary on the Greek New Testament: A Companion volume to the United Bible Societies' Greek New Testament (fourth revised edition) (2 ed.). Deutsche Biblegesellschaft. ISBN 978-3-438-06010-5.
- Molnár, Miklós (2001). A Concise History of Hungary. Cambridge University Press. ISBN 978-0-521-66736-4.
- Parke, David B. (1957). The Epic of Unitarianism: Original Writings From the History of Liberal Religion. Starr King. ISBN 9781558962460. OCLC 645900157.
- Pásztori-Kupán, István. "Invocation of biblical authority in a secular decision: the theocratic relevance of the Torda Edict (1568)." Református Szemle 101, no. 6 (2008): 677-699. [in English]
- Ritchie, Susan J. (2014). Children of the Same God: The Historical Relationship Between Unitarianism, Judaism, and Islam. Skinner House Books. ISBN 978-1-55896-725-0.
- Sugar, Peter F. (1996) [1977]. Southeastern Europe under Ottoman Rule, 1354–1804. A History of East Central Europe. Vol. 5. University of Washington Press. ISBN 0-295-96033-7. OCLC 1120808279.
- Szegedi, Edit (2009). "The Birth and Evolution of the Principality of Transylvania (1541–1690); The Reformation in Transylvania: New Denominational Identities; Confessionalization". In Pop, Ioan-Aurel; Nägler, Thomas; Magyari, András (eds.). The History of Transylvania, Vol. II (From 1541 to 1711). Romanian Academy, Center for Transylvanian Studies. pp. 99–111, 229–254. ISBN 978-973-7784-04-9.
- Tihany, Leslie C. (1975). "Islam and the Eastern Frontiers of Reformed Protestantism". Reformed Review. 29 (1): 52–71. ISSN 0034-3064.
- Williams, George Huntston (1992). The Radical Reformation. Truman State University Press. ISBN 978-0-94354-983-5.
