= Paul Wiener =

Head of the Transylvanian Saxons' Evangelical Church

Plaque at the Piața Albert Huet in Sibiu

Paul Wiener was the first superintendent, or head, of the Transylvanian Saxons' Evangelical Church (in the Kingdom of Hungary) from 1553 to 1556. He started his career as a canon at the Catholic Ljubljana Cathedral, but he became an ardent supporter of Martin Luther's theology. In 1547, he was arrested. After he refused to reject his Evangelical views, he was exiled from Carniola.

== Sources ==
- Daniel, David P. (1998) [1992]. "Hungary". In Pettegree, Andrew (ed.). The Early Reformation in Europe. Cambridge University Press. pp. 49–69. ISBN 978-0-521-39768-1.
- Keul, István (2009). Early Modern Religious Communities in East-Central Europe: Ethnic Diversity, Denominational Plurality, and Corporative Politics in the Principality of Transylvania (1526–1691). Brill. ISBN 978-90-04-17652-2.
