= Matthias Dévay =

Hungarian Protestant converter

Mátyás Biró, also known as Matthias Dévai Biro (c. 1500 in Déva – 1547 in Debrecen), was a Protestant Reformer who has been called the "Luther of Hungary".

== Life ==
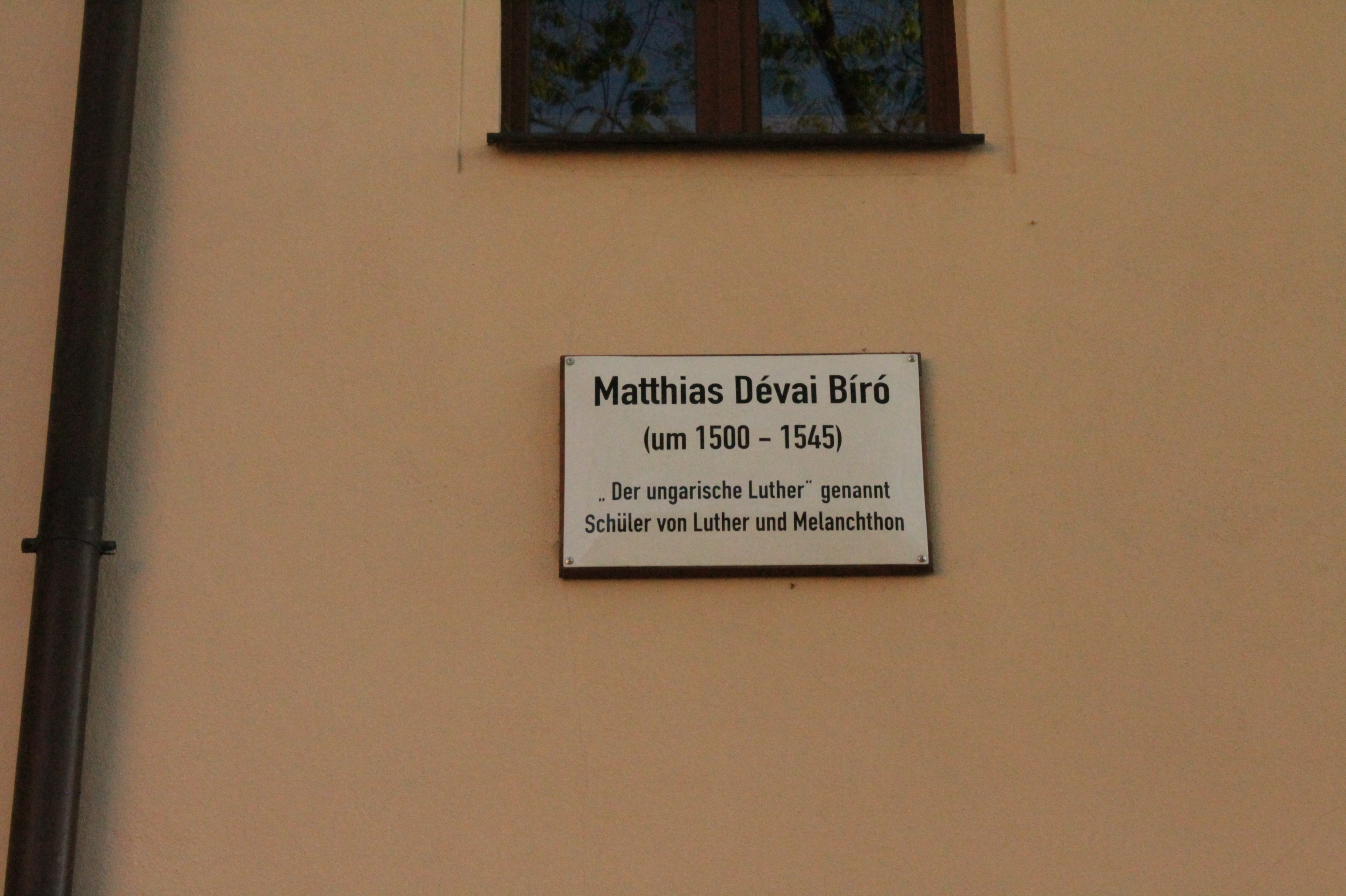
Plaque to Matthias Devai Biro, quadrangle of Wittenberg University

Dévai was born in Déva in Transylvania in eastern Hungary around 1500. He was later called "Devai" or "Dévay" because he was from Déva. He may have studied with Simon Grynaeus, the first Hungarian proponent of the Protestant Reformation, at Buda. The University of Cracow listed him as a student there in 1523. After two years of study, he was ordained as a priest and monk in the Roman Catholic Church.

Sometime between 1527 and 1529, Dévay became a supporter of the Protestant Reformation, and in 1529, he traveled to the University of Wittenberg to study under Martin Luther and Philip Melanchthon. As Luther's student, Dévay lived in Luther's house, a common practice in those days. The house and the student rooms are preserved in Wittenberg.

He returned to Buda by 1531, becoming the minister of a Protestant congregation. Protestant ideas were able to flourish in Hungary at this time because there had been a general breakdown in church discipline after virtually all Hungarian bishops were killed at the Battle of Mohács (1526) and the Kingdom of Hungary in general was in disarray. During his time in Buda, Dévay wrote a work denouncing prayer to saints. He also published 52 propositions explaining the Protestant position. Biro convinced members of the Batthyány and Bocskay families to support the Reformation. The Hungarian Reformation under Biro's leadership came to resemble the position later known as Calvinism. Hungarian Protestants came to distinguish between their faith, which they called magyar hit (Hungarian faith), from what they called német hit (German faith) (i.e. Lutheranism).

Dévay soon left Buda to become minister at Kassa. He was soon arrested by Thomas Szalaházy, bishop of Erlau, a close adviser to King Ferdinand I of Hungary. He was imprisoned first at Likavka, then at Pozsony, then at Vienna. He was tried before Johann Faber, Bishop of Vienna, another close adviser of Ferdinand, and a committed opponent of the Reformation. Biro was released soon after his trial, and returned to Buda where he resumed his work as a reformer. In 1532, he was re-arrested, and remained in prison until 1534.

Upon his release from prison, Dévay came under the protection of Tamás I Nádasdy. Dévay devoted his time to refuting the works of Gregory Szegedy, a doctor of the Sorbonne and provincial superior of the Franciscans in Hungary, who had written in opposition to the Reformation. Dévay wrote Orthographica Hungarica', the first book published in Hungarian.

In spite of King Ferdinand's opposition to the Reformation, Dévay supported Ferdinand's claim to the throne as opposed to his rival János Szapolyai, who was supported by the Ottoman Empire. The civil war between Ferdinand and János Szapolyai ultimately drove Miro from Hungary. He traveled to the court of George, Margrave of Brandenburg-Ansbach, bearing a letter of introduction from Philipp Melanchthon. From there, he traveled to Switzerland, where he adopted the view of the framers of the First Helvetic Confession on the topic of the Lord's Supper.

After returning to Hungary, Dévay was a zealous advocate of the Reformed position on the Lord's Supper, and denounced the Lutheran position. In 1544, the ministers of Sárvár complained to Martin Luther of the doctrine being taught by his former student, and Luther denounced Dévay's position as an abomination that he would fight against.

In Hungary, Dévay settled in Debrecen under the protection of one of Nádasdy's relatives. During this time, he wrote expositions of the Ten Commandments, the Lord's Prayer, the Apostles' Creed, and the Nicene Creed in the Hungarian language for the common man. He died in 1547, but his place of burial is unknown.

== See also ==
- Péter Perényi (1502–1548)
