= Márton Kálmáncsehi =

Hungarian pastor (1500–1550)

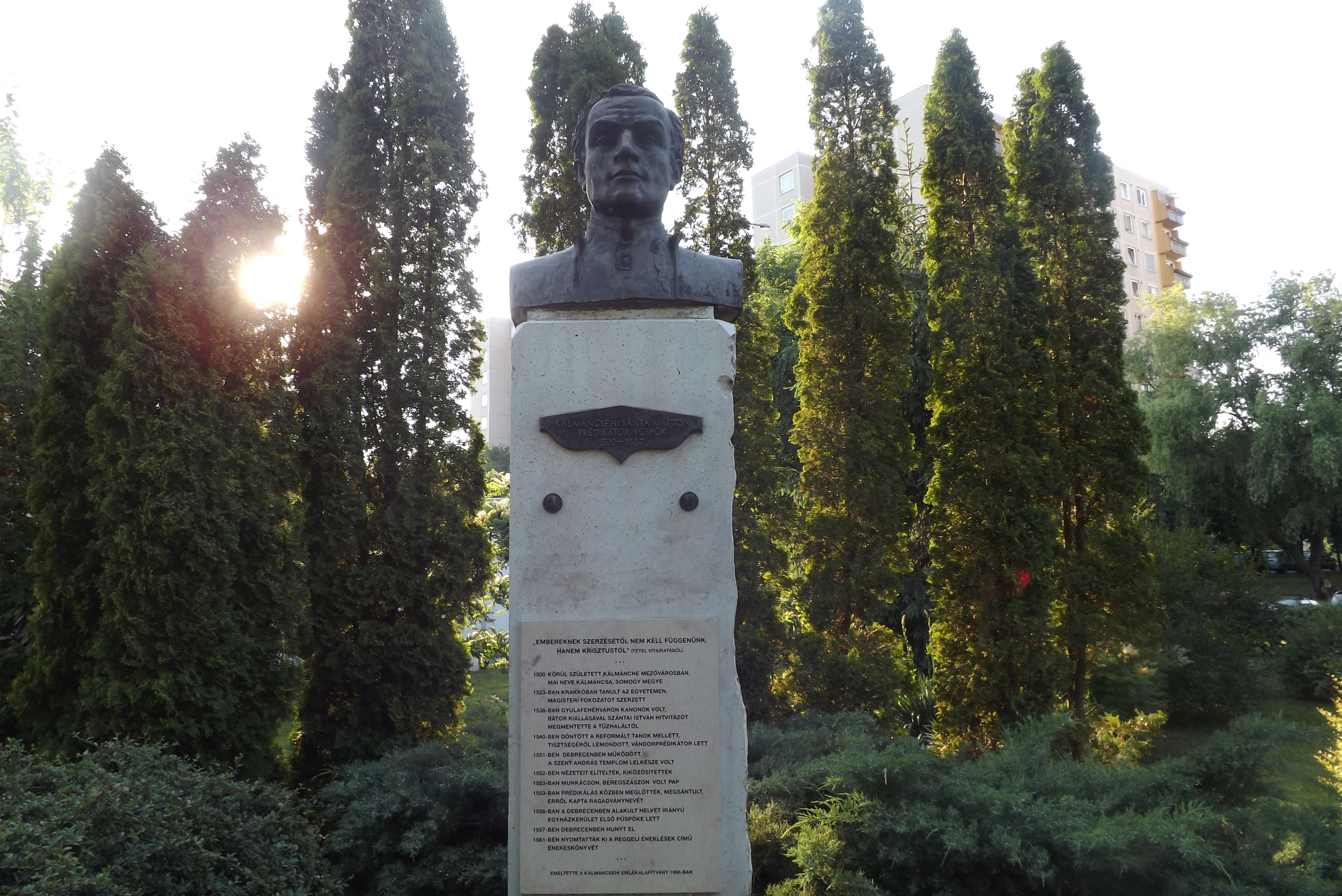
Bust of Kálmáncsehi in Debrecen

Márton Kálmáncsehi Sánta, also known as Martin Kálmáncsehi (Kálmáncsehi Sánta Márton; Kálmáncsa, 1500 – Debrecen, December 1550), was the first pastor to publicly preach Calvinist ideas in Hungary (in the 1540s). He began his church career as a canon at the Roman Catholic Diocese of Transylvania. He studied the theological works of Philip Melanchthon and Heinrich Bullinger. He succeeded the prominent reformator, Mátyás Dévai Bíró, as the Protestant town pastor of Debrecen in 1551.

== Sources ==
- Barta, Gábor (1994). "The Emergence of the Principality and its First Crises (1526–1606)". In Köpeczi, Béla; Barta, Gábor; Bóna, István; Makkai, László; Szász, Zoltán; Borus, Judit (eds.). History of Transylvania. Akadémiai Kiadó. pp. 247–300. ISBN 963-05-6703-2.
- Daniel, David P. (1998). "Calvinism in Hungary: the theological and ecclesiastical transition to the Reformed faith". In Pettegree, Andrew; Duke, Alastair; Lewis, Gillian (eds.). Calvinism in Europe, 1540-1620. Cambridge University Press. pp. 205–230. ISBN 0-521-57452-8.
- Péter, Katalin (1994). "Hungary". In Scribner, Bob; Porter, Roy; Teich, Mikuláš (eds.). The Reformation in National Context. Cambridge University Press. pp. 155–168. ISBN 0-521-40960-8.
