= Péter Perényi (1502–1548) =

Voivode of Transylvania, Crown Guard of the Holy Crown of Hungary

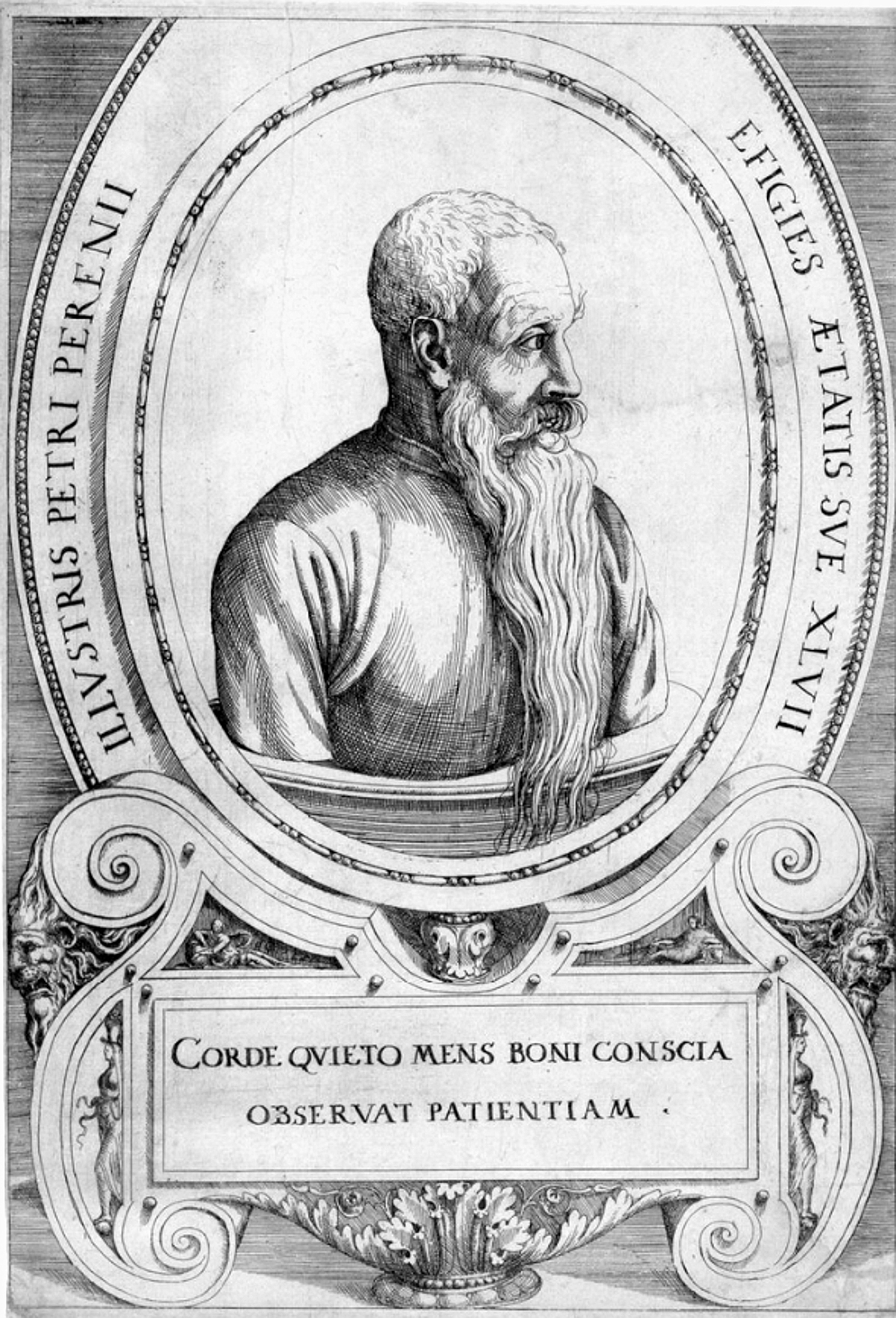
Péter Perényi

Baron Péter Perényi (Hungarian: legényi báró Perényi Péter; 1502 – 2 March 1548 in Vienna) was a Hungarian aristocrat who held the office of voivode of Transylvania from 1526 to 1529. He was an influential protector of Protestant preachers in the Kingdom of Hungary.

Since 1541 he held the title of Prince of the Holy Roman Empire (Prince of Siklos) but never used this title publicly.

== Sources ==
- Barta, Gábor (1994). "The Emergence of the Principality and its First Crises (1526–1606)". In Köpeczi, Béla; Barta, Gábor; Bóna, István; Makkai, László; Szász, Zoltán; Borus, Judit (eds.). History of Transylvania. Akadémiai Kiadó. pp. 247–300. ISBN 963-05-6703-2.
- Daniel, David P. (1998) [1992]. "Hungary". In Pettegree, Andrew (ed.). The Early Reformation in Europe. Cambridge University Press. pp. 49–69. ISBN 978-0-521-39768-1.
- Markó, László (2006). A magyar állam főméltóságai Szent Istvántól napjainkig: Életrajzi Lexikon [Great Officers of State in Hungary from King Saint Stephen to Our Days: A Biographical Encyclopedia] (in Hungarian). Helikon Kiadó. ISBN 963-547-085-1.
- Puskár, Anett (2004). "Szapolyai János és Perényi Péter". In Bessenyei, Jószef; Horváth, Zita; Tóth, Péter; Gyulai, Éva; Somorjai, Lehel (eds.). Tanulmányok Szapolyai Jánosról és a kora újkori Erdélyről [Studies on John Zápolya and on Early Medieval Transylvania]. Miskolci Egyetem Bölcsészettudományi Kar. pp. 215–230. ISBN 963-661-633-7.
