= Pál Bornemissza =

Hungarian catholic bishop

Pál Bornemissza was the Roman Catholic bishop of Transylvania in the Kingdom of Hungary from 1553 and 1556. King Ferdinand I appointed him to the episcopal see after years of vacancy, although the Transylvanian nobles had proposed an other candidate, Márton Kecseti. Bornemissza could not stop the spread of Reformation in his diocese and he left Transylvania in 1554. Two years later, he abdicated the bishopric. After his abdication, the Transylvanian bishopric was left vacant for more than 100 years.

== Sources ==
- Keul, István (2009). Early Modern Religious Communities in East-Central Europe: Ethnic Diversity, Denominational Plurality, and Corporative Politics in the Principality of Transylvania (1526–1691). Brill. ISBN 978-90-04-17652-2.
- Rácz, Lajos (1992). Főhatalom és kormányzás az Erdélyi Fejedelemségben [Sovereignty and State Administration in the Principality of Transylvania] (in Hungarian). Akadémiai Kiadó. ISBN 963-05-6301-0.
- Szegedi, Edit (2009). "The Reformation in Transylvania: New Denominational Identities; Confessionalization". In Pop, Ioan-Aurel; Nägler, Thomas; Magyari, András (eds.). The History of Transylvania, Vol. II (From 1541 to 1711). Romanian Academy, Center for Transylvanian Studies. pp. 229–254. ISBN 978-973-7784-04-9.
