= Gheorghe of Sîngeorgiu =

Gheorghe of Sîngeorgiu, also known as Gheorghe of Sângeorz, was the Reformed bishop of the Transylvanian Romanians from 1566 to around 1568.

== Background ==
Gheorghe's family was likely descended from the region of Hațeg or Hunedoara. Hațeg and Hunedoara were the centers of the Transylvanian domains of George, Margrave of Brandenburg-Ansbach in the Kingdom of Hungary. The Margrave appointed one of his German retainers, Georg Stolz, to administer Hunedoara. A devout adherent of Martin Luther's theology, Stolz started to spread Luther's views among the local "Wallachians", or Romanians, in 1526. The Transylvanian Saxons who officially adopted Lutheranism in the 1540s published catechisms in Romanians in 1544 and 1566.

== Bishop ==
King John Sigismund Zápolya converted from Catholicism to Lutheranism in 1562, and from Lutheranism to Calvinism in 1564. He was determined to convert the Greek Orthodox Romanians to Calvinism. For this purpose, Gheorghe was appointed "superintendent and bishop" of the Romanians at the Transylvanian Diet in Sibiu on 30 November 1566. On this occasion, the King also awarded him with Hungarian nobility. With this decision, the Diet made him the head of all Romanian clergymen, both priests and monks. The Diet ordered the expulsion of the Romanian priests who denied to convert to Calvinism, but the decree could not be implemented. Gheorghe held synods for the Romanian priests, but most of them absented themselves from the assemblies, because they regarded Gheorghe as the representative of an "impure faith", according to his own reports. Gheorghe was a patron of the Wallachian printer, Deacon Coresi. Coresi had established a printing house in Brașov and published books in Romanian.

== Sources ==
- Ghitta, Ovidiu (2009). "The Orthodox Church of Transylvania". In Pop, Ioan-Aurel; Nägler, Thomas; Magyari, András (eds.). The History of Transylvania, Vol. II (From 1541 to 1711). Romanian Academy, Center for Transylvanian Studies. pp. 255–269. ISBN 978-973-7784-04-9.
- Keul, István (2009). Early Modern Religious Communities in East-Central Europe: Ethnic Diversity, Denominational Plurality, and Corporative Politics in the Principality of Transylvania (1526–1691). Brill. ISBN 978-90-04-17652-2.
- Pop, Ioan-Aurel (2009). "Romanian Culture in the Second Half of the Sixteenth Century". In Pop, Ioan-Aurel; Nägler, Thomas; Magyari, András (eds.). The History of Transylvania, Vol. II (From 1541 to 1711). Romanian Academy, Center for Transylvanian Studies. pp. 281–292. ISBN 978-973-7784-04-9.
