= Eftimie (bishop of Transylvania) =

Eftimie was the Eastern Orthodox bishop of Transylvania from 1571 to 1574, and the bishop of Roman from 1574.

== Bishop ==
Eftimie was the hegumen, or head, of the Bistrița Monastery in Moldavia. Stephen Báthory, Voivode of Transylvania, appointed him to be the bishop of the Eastern Orthodox Romanians in his realm on 5 October 1571. During the reign of Báthory's Protestant predecessor, John Sigismund Zápolya, a Romanian Calvinist cleric was appointed as bishop of the Transylvanian Romanians, although most Romanians refused to convert to Calvinism. With Eftimie's appointment, the Catholic Báthory restored the Orthodox church hierarchy in Transylvania. Eftimie was ordained bishop by the Serbian patriarch, Makarije, at Peć in April 1572. His jurisdiction included Transylvania proper and Partium. Two years later he left Transylvania for Moldavia where he was made the bishop of Roman.

== Sources ==
- Ghitta, Ovidiu (2009). "The Orthodox Church of Transylvania". In Pop, Ioan-Aurel; Nägler, Thomas; Magyari, András (eds.). The History of Transylvania, Vol. II (From 1541 to 1711). Romanian Academy, Center for Transylvanian Studies. pp. 255–269. ISBN 978-973-7784-04-9.
- Keul, István (2009). Early Modern Religious Communities in East-Central Europe: Ethnic Diversity, Denominational Plurality, and Corporative Politics in the Principality of Transylvania (1526–1691). Brill. ISBN 978-90-04-17652-2.
- Pop, Ioan-Aurel (2009). "Romanian Culture in the Second Half of the Sixteenth Century". In Pop, Ioan-Aurel; Nägler, Thomas; Magyari, András (eds.). The History of Transylvania, Vol. II (From 1541 to 1711). Romanian Academy, Center for Transylvanian Studies. pp. 281–292. ISBN 978-973-7784-04-9.
