= Stephen Báthory (disambiguation) =

Stephen Báthory (1533–1586) was King of Poland and Grand Duke of Lithuania, Prince of Transylvania.

Stephen Báthory may also refer to:

- Stephen III Báthory (died 1444), Palatine of Hungary
- Stephen V Báthory (1430–1493), judge of the Royal Court and voivode of Transylvania
- Stephen VII Báthory (died 1530), Palatine of Hungary
- Stephen VIII Báthory (1477–1534), voivode of Transylvania
- Stephen Báthory (1553–1601), father of Gabriel Báthory
- Stephen Báthory (1555–1605), judge royal

== See also ==
- TSS Stefan Batory, an ocean liner
- Báthory family
