= Mézes de Debreczen =

Hungarian noble family

Mézes (with the praedicat Debreczen) is the name of an old Hungarian noble family from the lower-nobility.

== The History ==
The Mézes family can trace its roots back to the 16th century when settled in the city of Debrecen. Probably, the family is a branch of the Mézes de Mézes or Mézes de Méhkerék families. János Mézes aliter Nagy de Debreczen with his wife and children got noble patent in 06.04.1610. from Gabriel Bathori, Prince of Transylvania.

== Sources ==
- Mézes family on Hungarian wiki
- Databases of National Archives of Hungary
- Library of the National Archives of Hungary
- Mézes Miklós: A kalászba szökkenő vetés,1991.
- Mézes Ádám: Debreczeni és Retteghi Mézes család In: Nobilitas 2009. (szerk: Gudenus János József)
- Bunyitay Vincze: A VÁRADI PÜSPÖKSÉG TÖRTÉNETE ALAPÍTÁSÁTÓL A JELENKORIG
- Liber Regius
- Georgius Fejér: Codex diplomaticus Hungariae ecclesiasticus ac civiles
