= Stephen Báthory (1553–1601) =

Stephen Báthory of Somlyó (Hungarian: somlyói Báthory István; 1553 – 21 February 1601) was a member of Báthory family. He was the brother of Balthasar Báthory and Andrew Báthory.

== Early life ==
Stephen was the eldest son of András Báthory and Margit Majláth. He was born in 1553. His father died on 7 January 1563. Before the end of the year, his mother married János Iffjú, and moved to her new husband's estate in Érmihályfalva (now Valea lui Mihai in Romania) along with her four youngest children.

Stephen and the eldest of his four brothers, Gabriel, stayed behind in the Báthorys' castle in Szilágysomlyó (now Șimleu Silvaniei in Romania). They were put under the guardianship of their uncle, Christopher Báthory. In his letters, Stephen would mention several times his distant relative, Miklós Báthory (from the Ecsed branch of the Báthory family), with respect, showing that he knew him well in his childhood.

== Royal nephew ==
Stephen attended the Diet where his uncle and namesake, Stephen Báthory, was elected voivode of Transylvania on 25 May 1571. He was the favorite nephew of his uncle who financed his studies at the University of Padua from 1571 to 1573. Farkas Kovacsóczy was responsible for his education. The childless Stephen Báthory, who was elected king of Poland in December 1575, planned to make Stephen his successor. To strengthen Stephen's position, his uncle wanted to arrange a marriage between Stephen and Anna of Sweden, who was the granddaughter of Sigismund I, King of Poland, but both her father and the Polish noblemen opposed the marriage. His uncle also dispatched him to launch a military expedition against Moldavia in 1577.

Stephen married Zsuzsanna Bebek without his uncle's consent in 1580. She was descended from an aristocratic family, but the marriage outraged Stephen's royal uncle. Stephen's conversion from Catholicism to Protestantism further worsened his relationship with his uncle, but he soon returned to the Catholic faith.

== Family ==
Ancestors of Stephen Báthory

16. István Báthory
8. Miklós Báthory
17. Dorottya Várdai
4. Stephen Báthory
2. András Báthory
5. Katalin Thelegdy
1. Stephen Báthory
12. Mátyás Majláth
6. Stephen Majláth
3. Margit Majláth
14. Ferenc Nádasdy
7. Katalin Nádasdy

== Sources ==
- Barta, Gábor (1994). "The Emergence of the Principality and its First Crises (1526–1606)". In Köpeczi, Béla; Barta, Gábor; Bóna, István; Makkai, László; Szász, Zoltán; Borus, Judit (eds.). History of Transylvania. Akadémiai Kiadó. pp. 247–300. ISBN 963-05-6703-2.
- Horn, Ildikó (2002). Báthory András [Andrew Báthory] (in Hungarian). Új Mandátum. ISBN 963-9336-51-3.
- Markó, László (2000). A magyar állam főméltóságai Szent Istvántól napjainkig: Életrajzi Lexikon [Great Officers of State in Hungary from King Saint Stephen to Our Days: A Biographical Encyclopedia] (in Hungarian). Magyar Könyvklub. ISBN 963-547-085-1.
- Nagy, László (1988). Tündérkert fejedelme: Báthory Gábor [Prince of the Pixies' Garden: Gabriel Gáthory]. Zrínyi Kiadó. ISBN 963-326-947-4.
