= Stephen Báthory (1555–1605) =

Judge royal of the Kingdom of Hungary

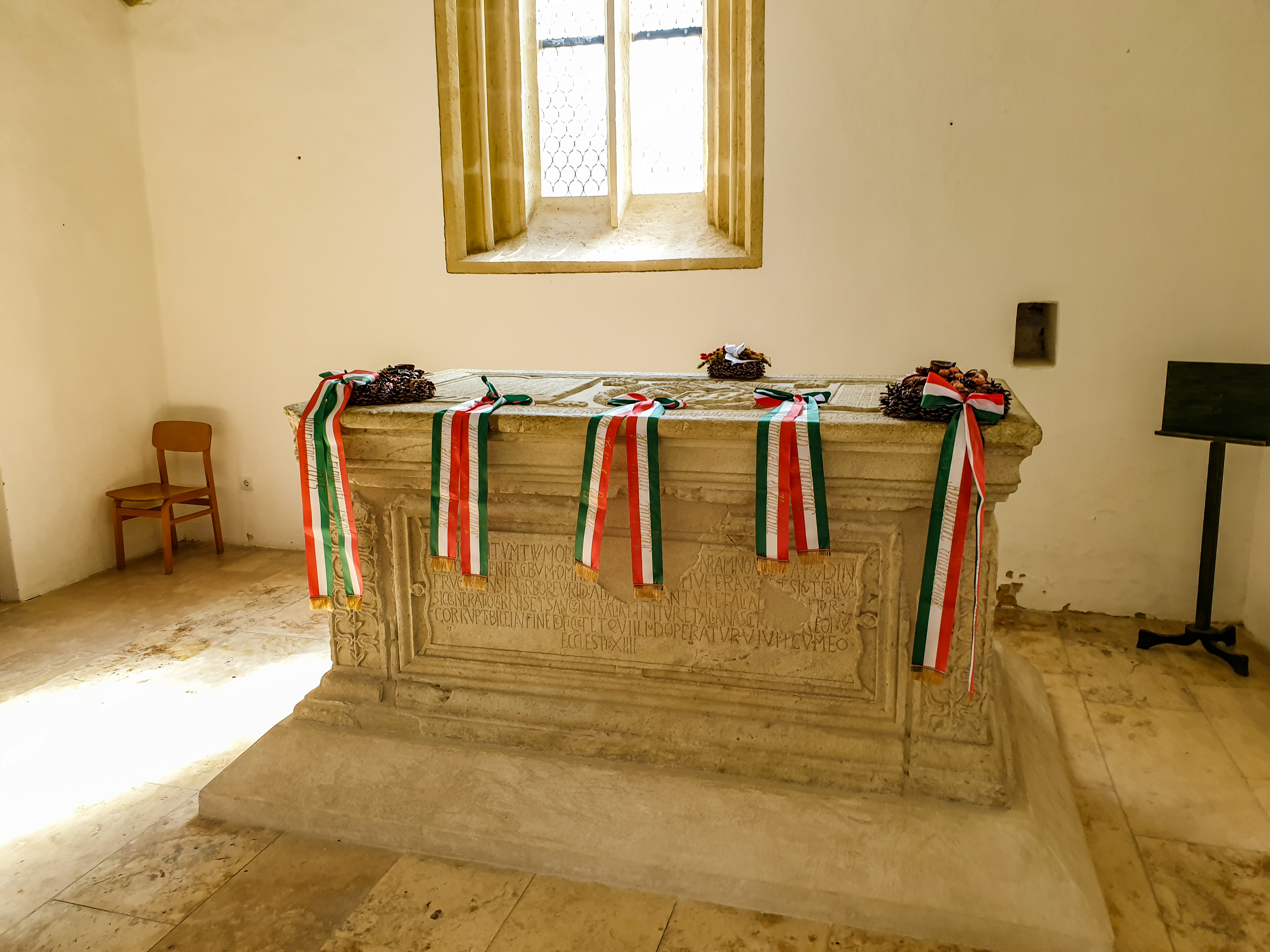
Sarcophagus of István Báthori in the reformed church of Nyírbátor

Stephen Báthory of Ecsed (Hungarian: ecsedi Báthory István; 1555 – 25 July 1605) was judge royal of the Kingdom of Hungary from 1586 to 1605.

== Early life ==
Stephen was the son of György Báthory (from the Ecsed branch of the family), and his distant relative, Anna Báthory (from the Somlyó branch). He was born in 1555. His younger sister was the infamous Elizabeth Báthory.

== Ancestors ==
Ancestors of Stephen Báthory

16. Stephen Báthory of Ecsed
8. András Báthory of Ecsed
17. Borbála Butkai
4. Stephen Báthory of Ecsed
9. Dorottya Várdai
2. György Báthory of Ecsed
5. Sophia of Masovia
1. Stephen Báthory
24. István Báthory of Somlyó
12. Miklós Báthory of Somlyó
25. Dorottya Várdai
6. Stephen Báthory of Somlyó
3. Anna Báthory of Somlyó
7. Catherine Telegdi

== Sources ==
- Horn, Ildikó (2002). Báthory András [Andrew Báthory] (in Hungarian). Új Mandátum. ISBN 963-9336-51-3.
- Markó, László (2000). A magyar állam főméltóságai Szent Istvántól napjainkig: Életrajzi Lexikon [Great Officers of State in Hungary from King Saint Stephen to Our Days: A Biographical Encyclopedia] (in Hungarian). Magyar Könyvklub. ISBN 963-547-085-1.
