= Carl Gustav von Simolin =

Russian diplomat (1715–1777)

Carl Alexander
- Born: 10 May 1715; Turku, Sweden
- Died: 27 August 1777 (aged 62); Spa

Carl Gustav Alexander, Freiherr von Simolin (10 May 1715 in Turku - 27 August 1777), brother of Johann Matthias von Simolin, was a Russian diplomat.

He was assigned to political missions early on and was particularly active in 1743 in the peace negotiations in Turku. In 1756, he went to Courland as Minister for Empress Elisabeth, a post he held with great skill under the most difficult circumstances until the end of his life. King Stanislaus Augustus made him and his brother a baron. He died in 1777 as a Russian Active State Councillor in Spa.
