= Von Simolin =

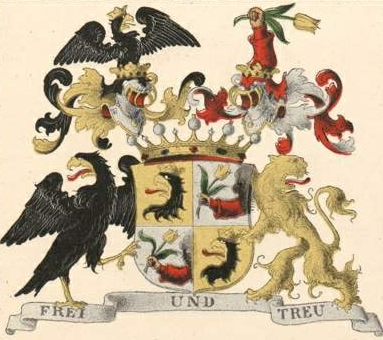
Baronial coat of arms of the family from the Baltisches Wappenbuch

The von Simolin family is a noble family of Finnish origin. It descends from a burgher in Turku, whose Finnish surname Simola was changed to Swedish sounding Simolin by his son, who became a Lutheran pastor in Tallinn.

== History ==
In earlier genealogical literature it was often stated that the family had its origins in Transylvania, now in Romania, connected with the Hungarian noble Báthory family.

Brothers Carl Gustav von Simolin and Johann Matthias von Simolin were ennobled in Holy Roman Empire. The Simolin family possessed large estates in Prussia and Courland and members served the Russian Empresses Elizabeth and Catherine as diplomats.

Court marshal Robert Freiherr von Simolin (b.1851-d.1927) took the name Simolin-Bathory.
