= Johann Matthias von Simolin =

Russian diplomat (1720–1799)

Johann Matthias, Freiherr von Simolin (b. July 17, 1720 in Turku – d. September 19, 1799 in Vienna), brother of Carl Gustav von Simolin, was envoy of Empress Catherine II at the Imperial Diet of Regensburg. He then went to Copenhagen as minister plenipotentiary, was then accredited as ambassador in Stockholm in 1777, and worked here through secret connections on the insurrection of Finland. In 1780 he went to London as ambassador and in 1786 to Paris. Here he presented Queen Marie Antoinette June 5, 1791 under the name of a Mrs. v. Korff issued a passport, as a result of which he lost a significant part of his fortune. Retired from business, he later lived for several years in Frankfurt am Main, until he was called back to Russia as President of the State Judicial Collegium. On the way there he died on 1799 in Vienna.
