= Margit Majláth =

Hungarian noblewoman

Margit Majláth (died after 1596) was a Hungarian noblewoman.

== Biography ==
Her father was István Majláth of Fogaras. In 1548 she was betrothed to András Báthory and married him in 1551. Ildikó Horn writes that they had six children:

- Stephen Báthory (1553–1601)
- Gabriel Batory (1555–1586)
- Anna
- Katrina
- Balthasar Báthory
- Andrew Báthory

On the other hand, Ferenc Budai writes that they had sons Boldizsár (Balthasar) András (Andrew) and István and daughters Erzsébet and Anna.

After András died on January 7, 1563, the same year she married János Iffjú. Iffjú was beheaded by Sigismund Báthory on August 31, 1594. They had son János, but the latter had no issue, and the line of Iffjú became extinct. After the execution of her husband (János Iffjú), she with her son János moved to Poland, where her older son, Andrew Báthory, took care of her. The last dated information about her is that in 1596 she came to Warsaw to ask her older son to resign from his church career and take power in Transylvania.
