= Piotr Tylicki =

Former Bishop of Krakow

- Bishop of Kraków
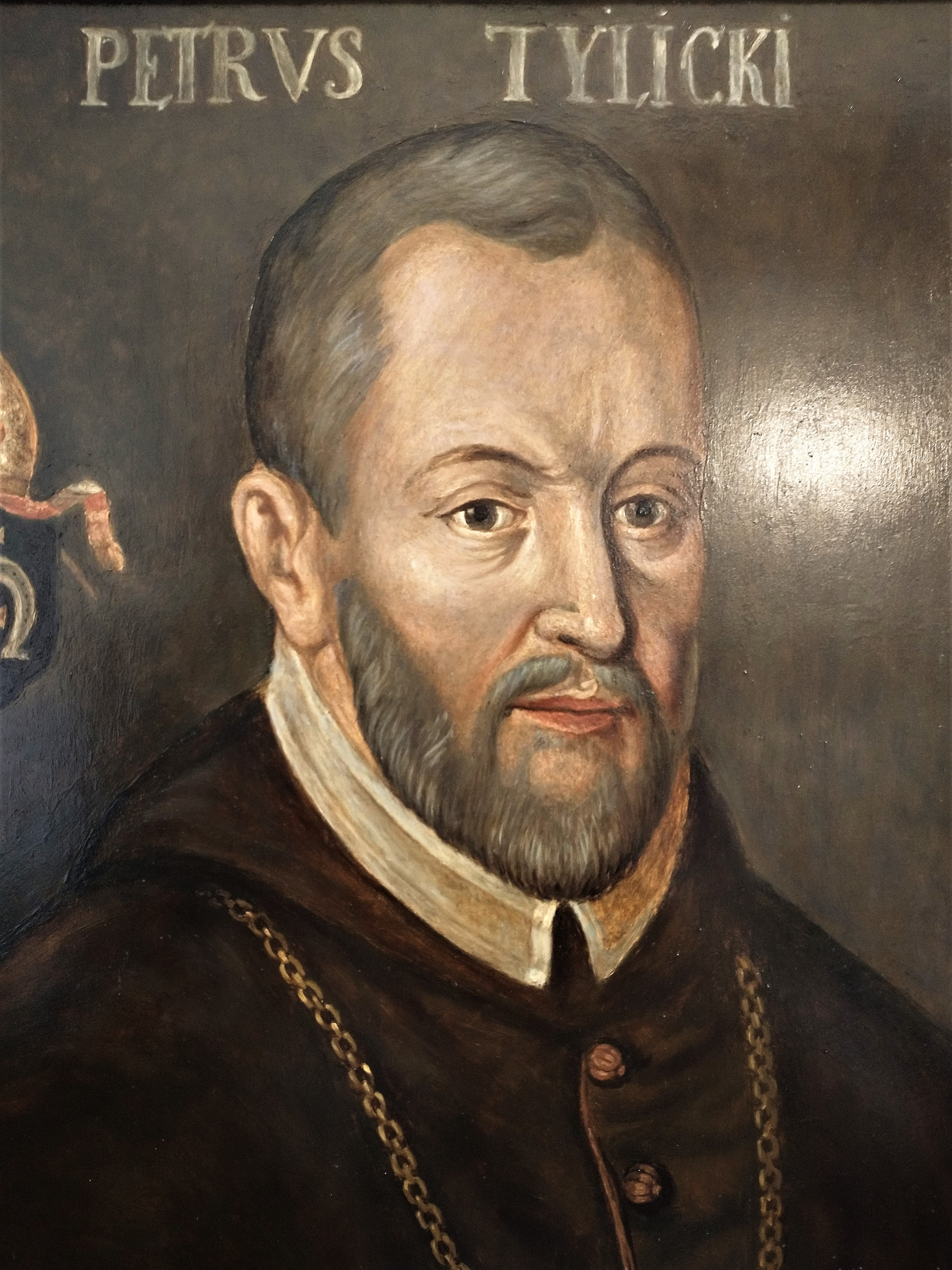

Personal details
- Born: 1543
- Died: 1616

Piotr Tylicki (1543–1616) was a Polish nobleman who was Bishop of Kraków (1607-1616). He was also Bishop of Chełmno, Warmia, and Włocławek, and Vice-Chancellor of the Crown of Poland (1598-1603).

Tylicki was born in Kowal to a family that claimed the Lubicz coat of arms. He received an education at the Kraków Academy. As Bishop of Kraków, he was made an inspector of monastic orders by the Holy See. He approved the construction of a Carmelite monastery in Kraków which initiated construction in 1611. Also as bishop, Tylicki played an important role in supporting Nowodworski Schools, an early type of private school, in Kraków. In 1615, after the publication of the Monita Secreta, Tylicki initiated an inquiry to ensure that the authors of the allegedly sacrilegious text were punished.

Tylicki died in 1616. The official announcement of his death described him as an exemplary politician and patriot. He was also described as virtuous and humble.

== See also ==
- Roman Catholic Archdiocese of Kraków
