= Báthory Castle =

- Șimleu Silvaniei
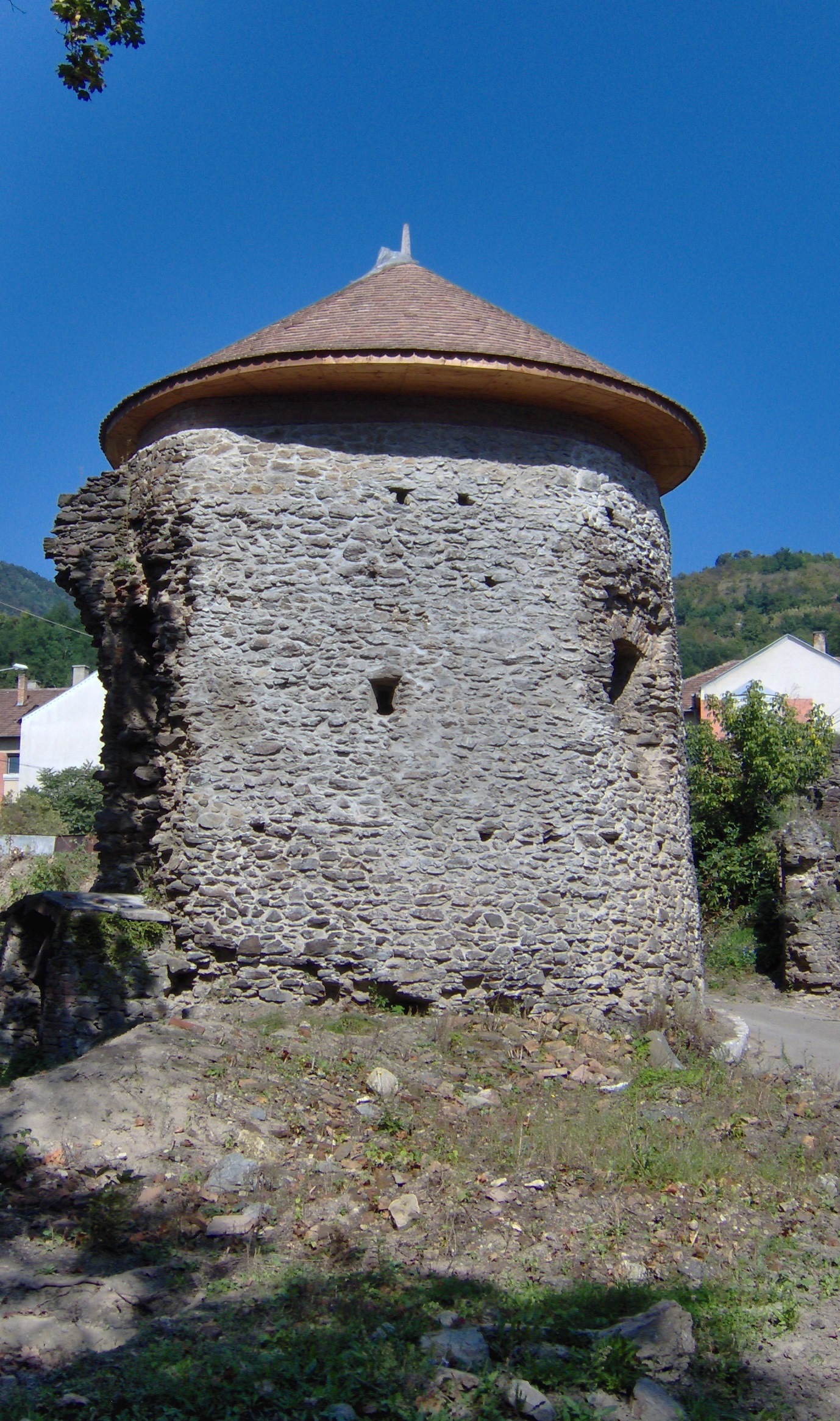

Location
- Coordinates: 47°13′50.67″N 22°47′56.87″E

Site history
- Built: 1592

Báthory Castle or Báthory Citadel, also known as Șimleu Silvaniei Fort, is a historic fort in Romania, in the modern-day city of Șimleu Silvaniei. Since the 1590s, the castle was the main residence of the Hungarian Báthory family during the era of the Principality of Transylvania.

== Gallery ==
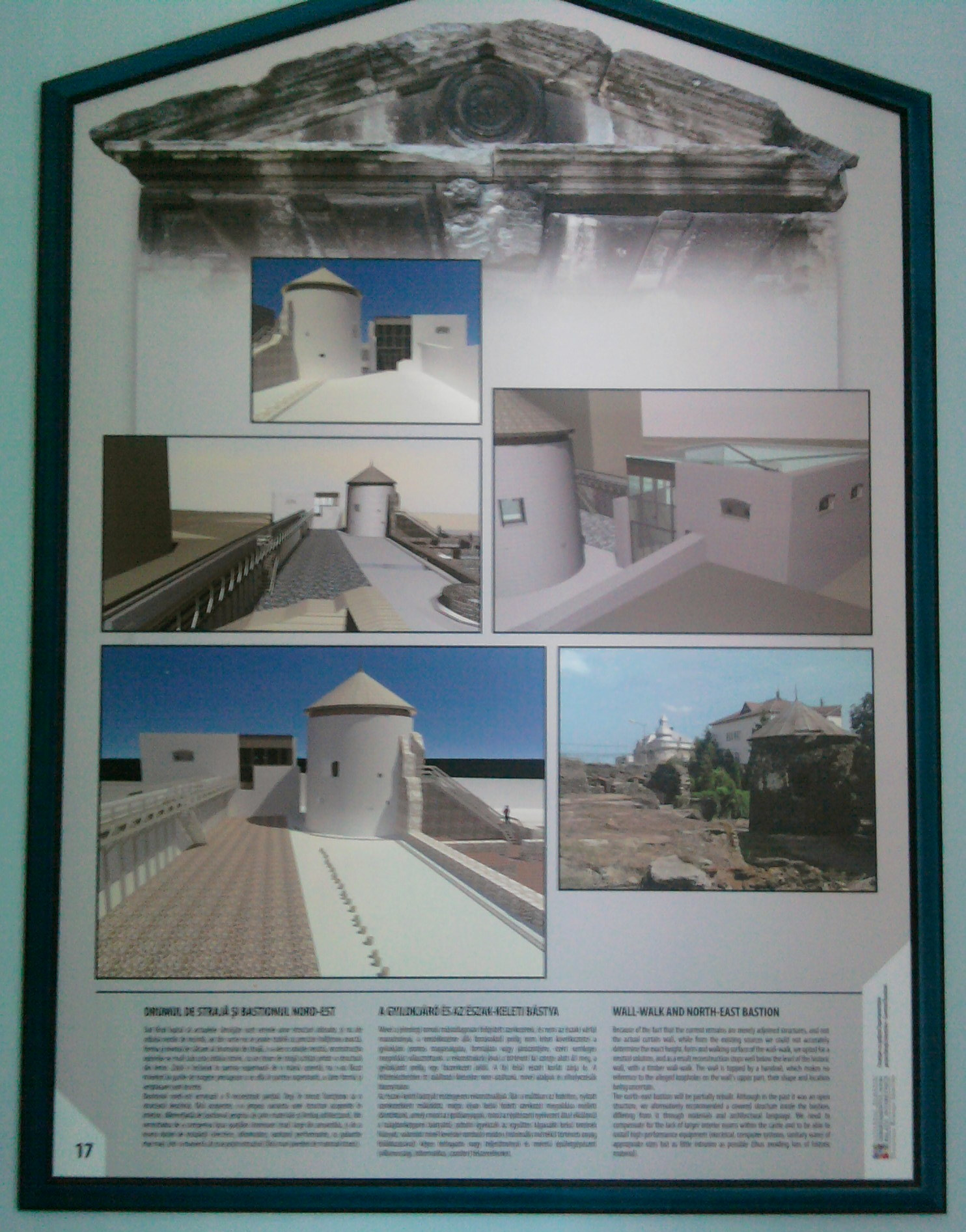

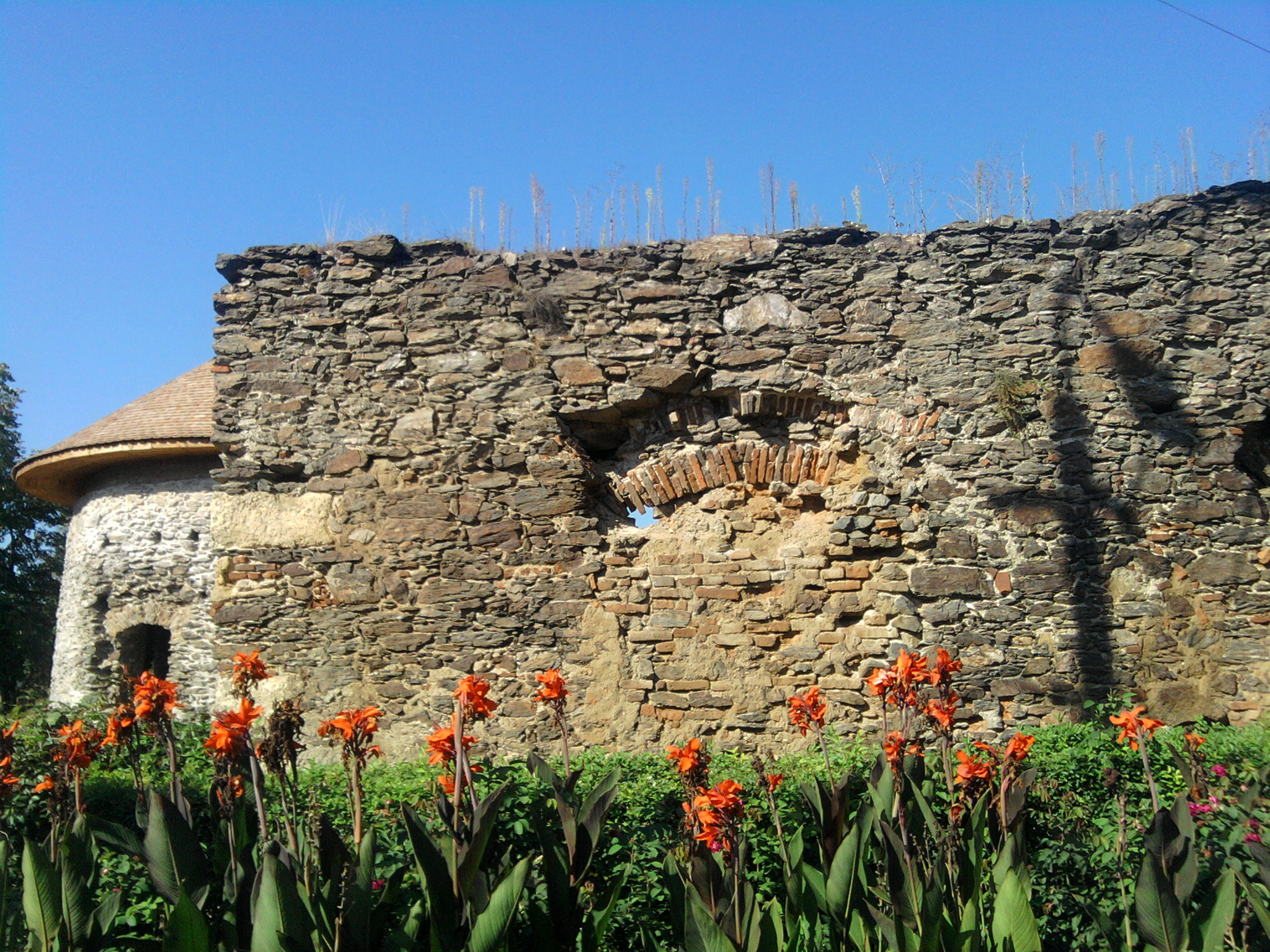

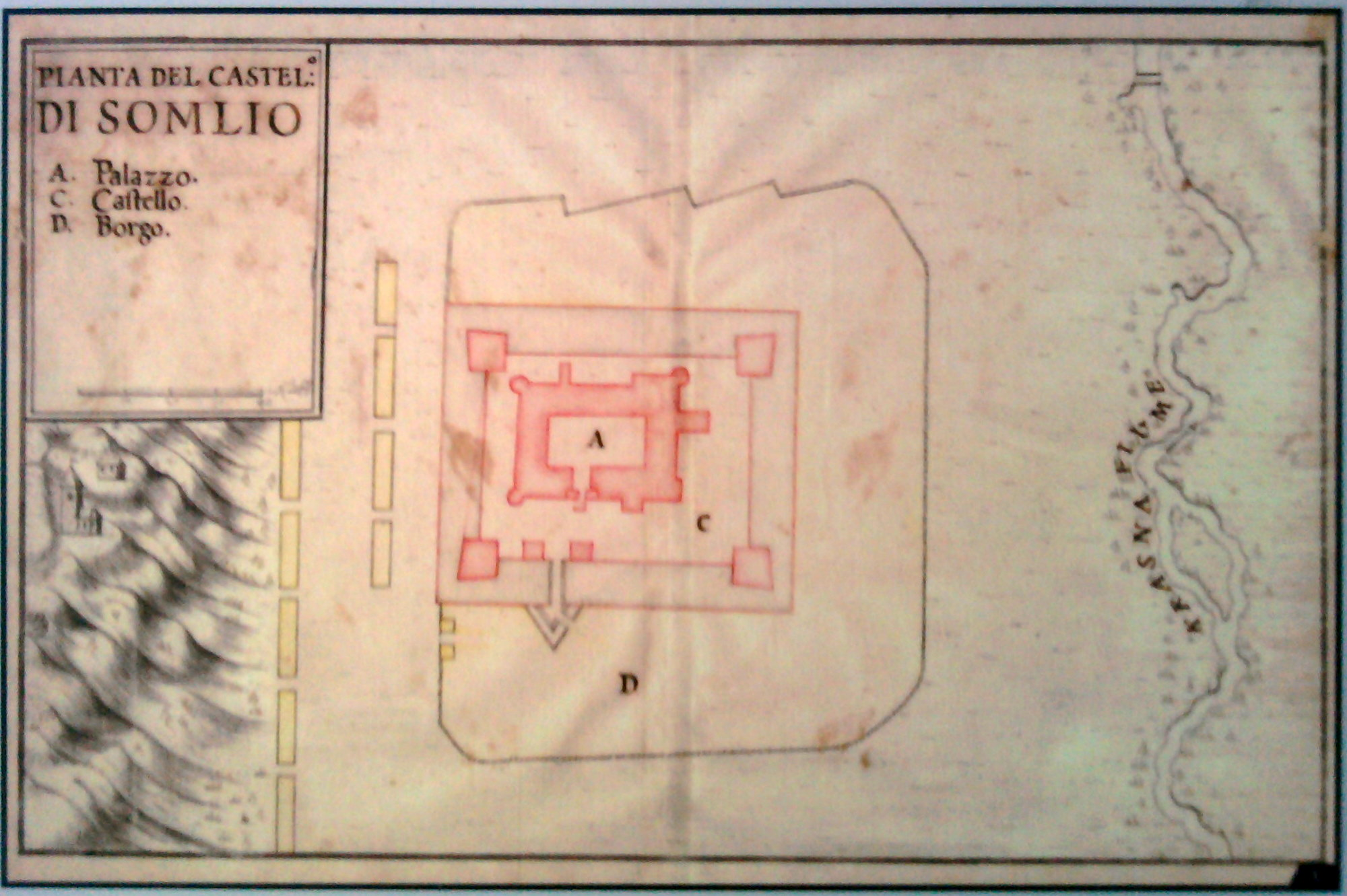
