= Stephen VIII Báthory =

Hungarian nobleman (1477–1534)

Stephen Báthory
- Born: 1477
- Died: 1534 (aged 56–57)
- Spouse: Catherine Telegdi
- House: Báthory
- Father: Nicholas Báthory
- Mother: Sophia Bánffy of Losoncz

Stephen VIII Báthory (Hungarian: VIII. Báthory István, pronounced [ˈbaːtori ˈiʃtvaːn]) (1477–1534) was a Hungarian noble.

== Biography ==
He was a son of Nicholas Báthory (1462–1500) of the Somlyó branch of the Báthory family, and his wife, Sophia Bánffy de Losoncz (b. 1477). He was appointed in 1521 adjoin (deputy) of the Voivode of Transylvania, and served under the Voivode John Zápolya. After the Battle of Mohács in 1526, Stephen supported Zápolya's claim to the Kingship of Hungary and in 1529 was made Voivode of Transylvania.

== Personal life ==
He fathered eight children with his wife Catherine Telegdi.

- Nicholas
- Catharine
- Andrew, father of Stephen, Balthasar and Andrew Báthory
- Sophia
- Anna (? –1570), born after her father's death, the mother of Elizabeth Báthory.
- Elizabeth (? –1562), who apparently was born well after her father's death
- Christopher (1530–1581), who governed Transylvania in the absence of his younger brother Stefan.
- Stephen (1533–1586), who became Voivode (and later Prince) of Transylvania and King of Polish-Lithuanian Commonwealth.

== Literature ==
- Farin, Michael, Heroine des Grauens. Elisabeth Báthory. Munich: P. Kirchheim, 2003. ISBN 3-87410-038-3.
- Wertner, Moritz, "Urgeschlechter in Siebenbürgen.", in Archiv des Vereins für siebenbürgische Landeskunde. Neue Folge, Bd. 29, Heft 1 (1899), Hermannstadt 1899, p. 156–235.
