= Stephen III Báthory =

Hungarian nobleman and commander

Stephen III Báthory (Hungarian: Báthory István) (died 11 November 1444, Varna) was a Hungarian nobleman and commander. His most prestigious position was Palatine of Hungary.

Stephen belonged to the Ecsed branch of the Báthory family. His parents were John V Báthory and Catherine, daughter of John Zanti. His older brother Bartholomew I Báthory fell in 1432 fighting against the Hussites. Stephen first appears in 1419 as dapiferorum regalium magister (master of the royal stewards), and later as a judge royal.

In 1435 he was appointed Palatine of Hungary by King Sigismund. Sigismund's short-lived successor, King Albert of Habsburg awarded him with the castle Bujak.

In 1444 he was the flag-bearer of Władysław, King of Poland and Hungary, in the Battle of Varna, in which he fell alongside his King.

Stephen was married twice:

1. Ursula, daughter of George de Kis Tapolcsa
2. Barbara, widowed Csapy

After his death, his second wife Barbara went to court against Christine, the widow of Stephen's younger brother Thomas, with which she disputed a mill's revenue.

Stephen fathered nine children:

- Catherine, who married George of Marczal
- Ladislaus (d. 1474), supreme count of the counties Szatmár and Szarand
- Andrew III Báthory (d. 1495), who was confirmed in his possession of Bujak. He is the only one among Stephen's son to produce male issue.
- Stephen V Báthory (d. 1493), served first as royal judge, excelled as a military commander and was made Voivod of Transylvania, the first of a long line of Báthory rulers of that country.
- Peter Báthory
- Thomas II Báthory, whose daughter married into the Zanoler family
- Paul I Báthory, surnamed the Mute
- Nicolaus III Báthory (d. 1506) was bishop first of Syrmia and after 1474 of Vác, renaissance scholar and advisor to King Matthias Corvinus
- Margaretha, who married first Nucgaek Szilággi, and then Paul Banfi.
