= Balthasar Báthory =

Transylvanian politician (1560–1594)

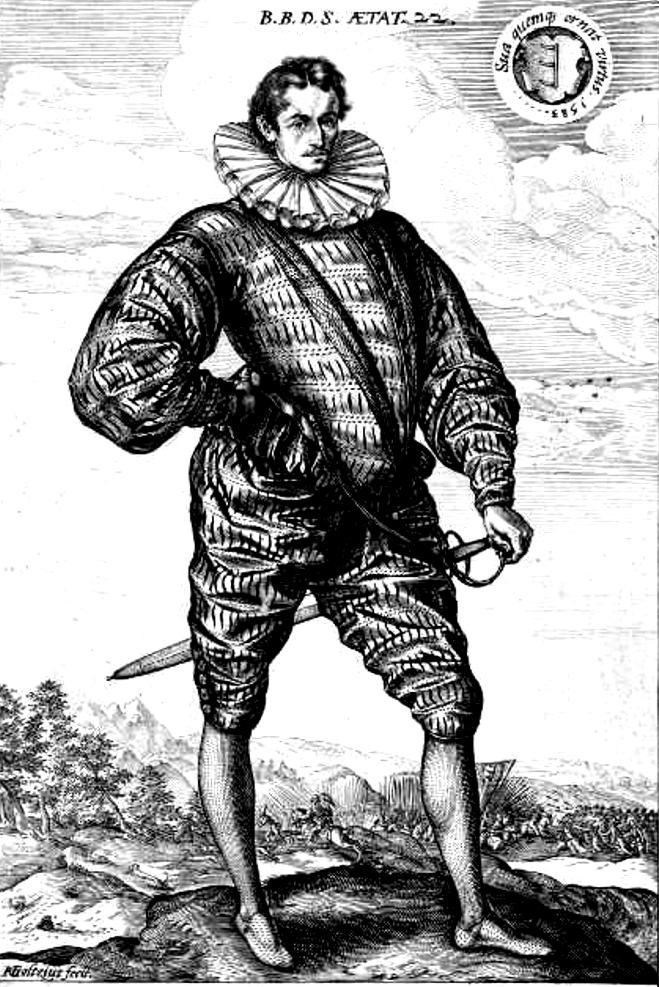
- Full name: Boldizsár Báthory de Somlyó
- Born: 1560
- Died: 11 September 1594 (aged 34); Szamosújvár, Principality of Transylvania (today: Gherla, Romania)
- Noble family: House of Báthory
- Spouse: Zsuzsanna Kendi
- Father: András Báthory
- Mother: Margit Majláth
- Occupation: Politician

Balthasar Báthory de Somlyó (Hungarian: Báthory Boldizsár; 1560 – 11 September 1594) was a Transylvanian politician from the Báthory family, and like his brother, prince Andrew Báthory, an opponent of the Habsburgs in Transylvania.

== Biography ==
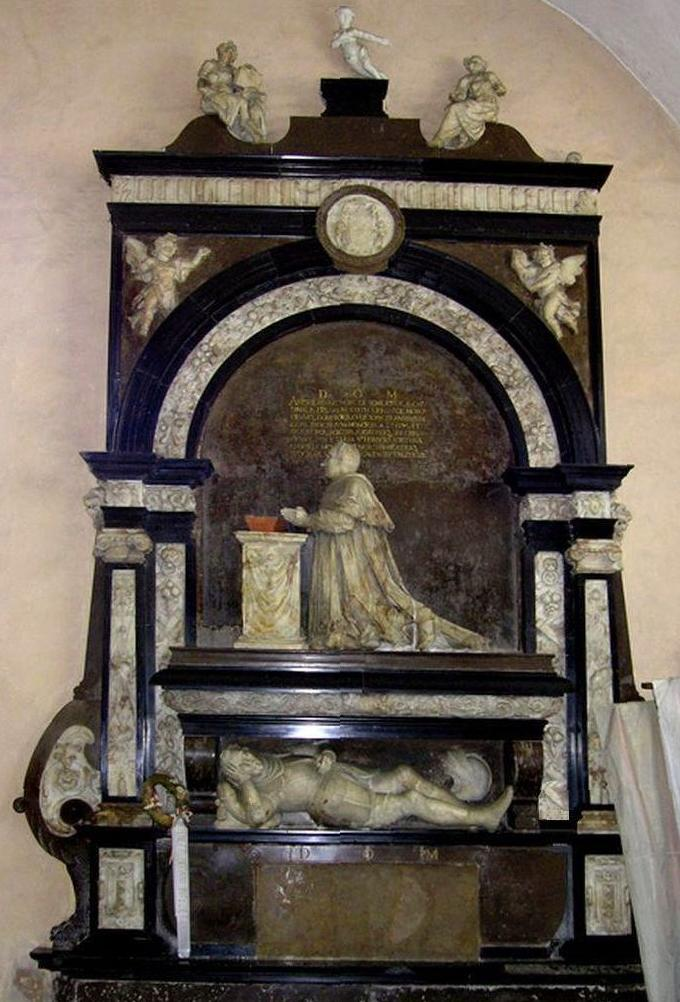
Tomb monument of Andrew and Balthasar Báthory (1598)

Balthasar was born around 1560 to a wealthy and powerful family, as son of Hungarian noblean András Báthory and his wife Margit Majláth. He was raised in Kraków, with his younger brother Andrew Báthory, at the court of his uncle Stephen Báthory, who became King of Poland in 1576.

By the time of Báthory's birth, the Kingdom of Hungary was divided into three parts: A western under the control of the Habsburgs (who also had the title of King of Hungary), a central control of the Ottoman Empire, and in the form of oriental Principality of Transylvania, ruled by the Hungarian nobility. Stephen Báthory was not only king of Poland at that time, but earlier, in 1571, was elected Prince of Transylvania, which did not give up title even after leaving for Kraków. Since there, he ruled the two states, leaving as regent in Transylvania, his older brother Christopher Báthory. The voivode died in 1581, after which Prince Stephen Báthory himself elected his nephew, the small child, 9-year-old noble: Sigismund Báthory.

Hoping that his family be consolidated into the power, and that the infant reached an older age to govern, Stephen continued to reign until his death in 1586. Sigismund reached the right age to govern itself without guardians in 1588, and that time Balthasar Báthory, when returned to Transylvania, become councilor of his cousin.

Later he joined the opposition of Sándor Kendi (his father-in-law), who refused to attack the Turks, but aimed to reach an amicable solution to the conflict. Unable to allow for this, the Holy Empire decided to extend its influence over Transylvania, to get rid of the faint young Prince. Kendi's opposition strengthened more increasingly by eruption of internal conflicts until May 1594. Balthasar was the responsible for the politics of Transylvania for a short time. In August of that same year, Sigismund regained power, and imprisoned all noble opponents including cousin Balthasar, who was later strangled in his cell.

== Sources ==
- Magyar életrajzi lexikon
- Erdély történelmi személyeinek adattára
