= Báthory family =

Hungarian royal family prominent in Central Europe from the 13th to 17th centuries

Báthory
- Parent house: Gutkeled
- Country: Kingdom of Hungary; Principality of Transylvania; Polish–Lithuanian Commonwealth
- Founded: 13th century
- Founder: Briccius
- Final ruler: Stephen XII (Ecsed branch); Andrew (Somlyó branch)
- Titles: Palatine of Hungary; Voivode of Transylvania; Prince of Transylvania; King of Poland; Grand Duke of Lithuania
- Dissolution: 1605; 421 years ago (Ecsed branch); 1637; 389 years ago (Somlyó branch)
- Cadet branches: Ecsed branch Szaniszlófi branch: Somlyó branch

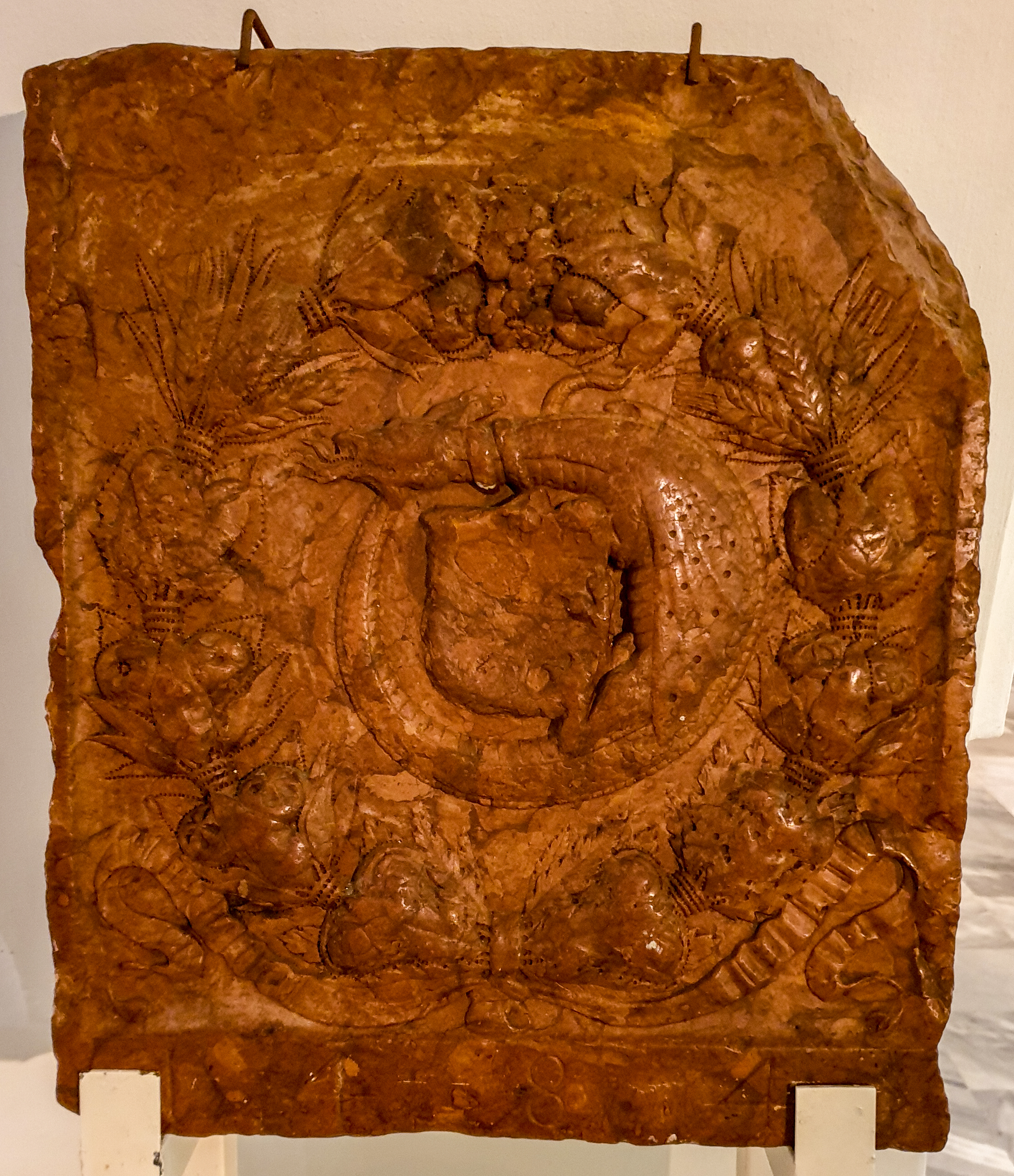
Red marble coat of arms of the family from 1484

The House of Báthory or Báthori (Polish: Batory) was an old and one of the most powerful Hungarian noble family founded by Briccius Bereck Báthory of the Gutkeled clan. The name means "of Bátor". The family rose to significant influence in Central Europe during the Late Middle Ages, holding high military, administrative and ecclesiastical positions in the Kingdom of Hungary. In the early modern period, the family produced several Princes of Transylvania and one King of Poland and Grand Duke of Lithuania (Stephen (István) Báthory).

== Origins ==
The Báthory family belonged to the Gutkeled, a clan of Hungarian Kingdom nobles, which traced its descent to the Swabian brothers Gut and Kelad, who immigrated into the Kingdom of Hungary from the castle Stof (probably Staufen im Breisgau or Hohenstaufen in Württemberg) during the reign of King Peter (reigned 1038–1046), who himself was partly of Venetian descent.

In 1279, King Ladislaus IV rewarded Andrew's brother Hodos Gutkeled and Andrew's sons George (d. 1307), Benedict (d. 1321) and Briccius (d. 1322) for their military services by granting them Bátor in the county of Szabolcs. Bátor had been the estate of Vajda son of Lángos, who had married a relative of Andrew but died without issue.

In 1310, Bátor came into the sole possession of Briccius when he reached an agreement with his nephew Michael and his cousin Vid to divide the joint possessions. After this, Briccius and his descendants named themselves Báthory, i.e. "of Bátor".

== Branches ==
The family divided into two major branches, which descended from the sons and grandsons of Briccius:

The elder branch of the family, the Báthory of Somlyó were descended from John, Count of Szatmár, the first-born son of Briccius, through his eldest son Ladislaus (died 1373). Ladislaus, Count of Szabolcs, married Anna Meggyesi and received Somlyó as dowry. Ladislaus' younger brother George II is the ancestor of the Simolin family, later called Báthory of Simolin (see below). A further division occurred under the great-grandsons of Ladislaus (latter half of the 15th century): John and Stephen dropped the name Báthory and founded the Szaniszlófi family, while Nikolaus continued the Somlyó branch.

The younger branch of the family, the Báthory of Ecsed, were descended from Luke, the youngest son of Briccius. Luke possessed wide estates in Szatmár and was granted by King Charles Robert the lordship of Ecsed, where he built the castle called Hűség (loyalty). This branch, since they retained the possession of Bátor, are sometimes called of Bátor or, as the younger branch, Nyírbátor (New Bathory).

== Legend and coats of arms ==
A legendary account, placing the Báthorys' origin in the year 900 (preceding the advent of the Gutkeled clan), relates how a god-fearing warrior called Vitus (a namesake of a member of the first generation of the Gutkeled clan) set out to fight a dragon, which lurked in the swamps next to the castle of Ecsed (actually built only in the 14th century) and harassed the countryside. Vitus killed it with three thrusts of his lance and as a reward received the castle. The grateful people honoured him with the names Báthory, meaning "good hero", and animus magnanimus. In Hungarian the word bátor means "brave". Several variants of the legend attributed this heroism to Opos the Brave, who lived in the second half of the 11th century and probably was not actually an ancestor of the Gutkeleds.

A simplified version of the Báthory coat of arms, based on those of Stephen Báthory, King of Poland and Grand Duke of Lithuania (reigned 1576–1586)

The Báthory coat of arms, granted in 1325 to the sons of Briccius, was styled in reference to this legend: three horizontally placed teeth surrounded by a dragon biting its own tail, the surrounding dragon being the emblem of the Order of the Dragon.

== Further history ==
The Ecsed branch first rises to prominence with the sons of Luke's grandson John V. His eldest son Bartholomew I fell in 1432 fighting against the Hussites. The second son, Stephen III rose to become Palatine of Hungary and in 1444 fell in the Battle of Varna as flag-bearer of Władysław, King of Poland and Hungary. He had also received the castle Bujak from King Albert of Habsburg.

Of Stephen's six sons, Ladislaus V (d. 1474) was supreme count of the counties Szatmár and Zaránd, the second Andrew III (d. 1495) was confirmed in his possession of Bujak. The third son, Stephen V (d. 1493) excelled as a military commander and was made Voivode of Transylvania, the first of a long line of Báthory rulers of that country.

The youngest son, Nicolaus III (d. 1506), bishop first of Syrmia and after 1474 of Vác, excelled as a renaissance scholar and served as counselor to King Matthias Corvinus.

Stephen VII first proved himself as Count of Temesvár and in 1519 was elected Palatine of Hungary, as which he had to contend with the opposition of the nobility. In 1526, he fought in the disastrous Battle of Mohács against the Ottomans, in which King Louis II fell.

After the harsh and fierce battle, Hungary was torn apart by the conflict between the rival royal claims. The two branches of the family positioned themselves on the opposing sides of the conflict. The Ecsed branch commonly sided with the Habsburgs: Stephen VII, who had escaped the battle, fled with Louis' widow to Pozsony (now Bratislava), where he organized the election of Ferdinand of Austria as King of Hungary. In the 1550s, when Ferdinand briefly gained control of Transylvania in 1551, he installed Stephen's nephew Bonaventura as his lieutenant to govern the country.

The Somlyó branch, on the other hand, supported John Zápolya, whom the greater part of the Hungarian nobility had elected King. Zápolya appointed Stephen VIII Voivode of Transylvania, which he governed until his death in 1534. Later, the interest of the Zápolyas were represented at the Habsburg court by the Voivode's son Stephen IX, who would go on to become Prince of Transylvania and King of Poland.

Impressed by Stephen, George VI Báthory, of the Ecsed branch, was persuaded to change his allegiance from the Habsburgs to Zápolya, for which the Habsburg king deprived him of his castle Bujak. George strengthened his alliance to Stephen by marrying his sister Anna, uniting the branches. Anna Báthory was the widow of the last descendant of the Dragfi family and George now seized the castles of the Dragfi. Since the Dragfi estates were legally due to the crown, the Habsburgs forced George to yield the castles and withdrew to Csitsva in Zemplén County.

George and Anna Báthory produced the most infamous member of the family, Elizabeth, a widow Countess who was eventually arrested for allegedly murdering hundreds of young girls, mostly peasants, over the course of many years. She was sentenced to life imprisonment in one of the Báthory castles. According to the opinions of a majority of historians, legends such as her bathing in the blood of the young women were based on later rumors; the validity of the charges themselves are debated. While some modern historians believe there was a plot to steal her lands, there is a record of her own Lutheran pastor, István Magyari, making a complaint about her crimes against young women in her care eight years before an official investigation was launched. Some scholars have suggested that she served as one of Bram Stoker's influences for writing the novel Dracula, but the evidence to support this is slim.

=== Notable members of the Somlyó branch ===
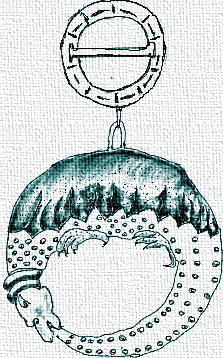
Reconstruction of the Order of the Dragon emblem (II) based on the sketches in Austrian Museum custody; the original badge is missing.

- Stephen VIII Báthory (1477–1534), Voivode of Transylvania.
- Stephen IX Báthory (1533–1586), youngest son of Stephen VIII, Voivode (and later Prince) of Transylvania and King of Poland and Grand Duke of Lithuania.
- Christopher Báthory (1530–1581), son of Stephen Báthory of Somlyó and elder brother of the King of Poland, administered Transylvania as voivode during the absence of his brother.
- Sigismund Báthory (1572–1613), son of Christopher, Prince of Transylvania.
- Cardinal Andrew Báthory (1562/63–1599), cousin of Sigismund, Prince of Transylvania, Grand Master of the Order of the Dragon.
- Gabriel I Báthory (1589–1613), nephew of Andrew, Prince of Transylvania.
- Sophia Báthory (died 1680), niece of Gabriel Báthory, married to George II Rákóczi uniting the families of the Báthory and the Rákóczi, supported the Counter-Reformation.

=== Notable members of the Ecsed branch ===
- Stephen III Báthory (died 1444), Palatine of Hungary
- Stephen V Báthory (died 1493), Voivode of Transylvania
- Barbara Báthory, daughter of Andrew III, married Palatine Emericus de Perén
- George V Báthory, son of Andrew III, Agazonum regalium magister, supreme count of Sümegh
- Stephen VII Báthory (died 1530), son of Andrew III, Hungarian commander, Palatine of Hungary
- Andrew IV Báthory, son of Andrew III, Ban of Belgrad, supreme count of Szatmár, married Catherine of Rozgon, which brought him the castles of Csitsva, Cserép, Rozgon and Thora.
- Bonaventura Báthory (also called Andrew by his soldiers) (d. 1566), first-born son of Andrew IV, supreme count of Szatmár and Szabolcs, later tabernicorum regalium magister and royal judge. He married twice without having issue.
- Nicolaus VI Báthory (died 1585), son of Andrew IV, a royal judge, he is described as "a man of rare honesty, powerful in possessions and influence east of the river Theiss", he died after falling from a chariot.
- George VI Báthory, son of Andrew IV, turned on the Habsburgs. Father of Elizabeth Báthory.
- Stephen XII Báthory (died 1605), son of George VI, royal judge in the counties Sümegh and Szatmár and supreme count of Szabolcs, opened the doors of his castle Ecsed to Stephen Bocskay in his rebellion against the Habsburg, dies shortly afterward.
- Gabriel Báthory, the younger brother of Stephen XII, was the last male member of the Ecsed line. It is unclear whether he died before or after his sisters Elizabeth and Sophia.
- Elizabeth Báthory (died 1614), daughter of George VI and through her mother, niece of the Polish King Stephen Báthory. Descendant of both the Ecsed and Somlyó branches of the Bathory family. Ferenc Nádasdy's wife, and after his death, the wealth and properties were inherited by her.

== Báthory of Simolin ==
Another branch of the family are the Báthory of Simolin family, which was named after their estate Simony (or Simolin). They descended from George II, the younger son of John I, through the George's grandson Michael. In the 15th century, Michael's brothers George and Ladislaus, who both died without issue, had sold their heritage to the then-head of the Somlyó branch, Nicolaus. The Simolin family possessed large estates in Prussia and Courland and members served the Russian Empresses Elizabeth and Catherine as diplomats. In the 19th century, long after the demise of the other branches, the family claimed name and title of Counts Báthory, since their ancestor Michael had never consented to the sale conducted by his brothers, and in 1852 the Russian government confirmed the legitimacy of their claims.

== See also ==
- List of titled noble families in the Kingdom of Hungary
- Bakunin family

== Literature ==
- Craft, Kimberly, "Infamous Lady: The True Story of Countess Erzsébet Báthory." (2009). ISBN 1-4495-1344-1.
- Farin, Michael, Heroine des Grauens. Elisabeth Báthory. Munich: P. Kirchheim, 2003. ISBN 3-87410-038-3.
- Wertner, Moritz, "Urgeschlechter in Siebenbürgen.", in Archiv des Vereins für siebenbürgische Landeskunde. Neue Folge, Bd. 29, Heft 1 (1899), Hermannstadt 1899, pp. 156–235.
