= History of Transylvania =

Transylvania is a historical region in central and northwestern Romania. It was under the rule of the Agathyrsi, part of the Dacian Kingdom (168 BC–106 AD), Roman Dacia (106–271), the Goths, the Hunnic Empire (4th–5th centuries), the Kingdom of the Gepids (5th–6th centuries), the Avar Khaganate (6th–9th centuries), the Slavs, and the 9th century First Bulgarian Empire. During the late 9th century, Transylvania was part of the Hungarian conquest, and the family of Gyula II of the seven chieftains of the Hungarians ruled Transylvania in the 10th century. King Stephen I of Hungary asserted his claim to rule all lands dominated by Hungarian lords, and he personally led his army against his maternal uncle Gyula III. Transylvania became part of the Kingdom of Hungary in 1002, and it belonged to the Lands of the Hungarian Crown until 1920.

After the Battle of Mohács in 1526 it belonged to the Eastern Hungarian Kingdom, from which the Principality of Transylvania emerged in 1570 by the Treaty of Speyer. During most of the 16th and 17th centuries, the principality was a vassal state of the Ottoman Empire; however, the principality had dual suzerainty (Ottoman and Habsburg kings of Hungary).

In 1690, the Habsburg dynasty claimed and gained possession of Transylvania through the historic rights of the Hungarian crown. After the failure of Rákóczi's War of Independence in 1711, Habsburg control of Transylvania was consolidated and Hungarian Transylvanian princes were replaced with Habsburg imperial governors. During the Hungarian Revolution of 1848, the Hungarian government proclaimed union with Transylvania in the April Laws of 1848. After the failure of the revolution, the March Constitution of Austria decreed that the Principality of Transylvania be a separate crown land entirely independent of Hungary. After the Austro-Hungarian Compromise of 1867, the separate status of Transylvania ceased and the region was incorporated again into the Kingdom of Hungary (Transleithania) as part of the Austro-Hungarian Empire. During this period the Romanian community experienced the awakening of self-consciousness as a nation, which was manifested in cultural and ideological movements such as Transylvanian School, and the drafting of political petitions such as Supplex Libellus Valachorum. After World War I, the National Assembly of Romanians from Transylvania proclaimed the Union of Transylvania with Romania on 1 December 1918. Transylvania became part of Kingdom of Romania by the Treaty of Trianon in 1920. In 1940, Northern Transylvania reverted to Hungary as a result of the Second Vienna Award, but it was returned to Romania after the end of World War II.

Due to its varied history, the population of Transylvania is ethnically, linguistically, culturally and religiously diverse. From 1437 to 1848 political power in Transylvania was shared among the mostly Hungarian nobility, German burghers and the seats of the Székelys (a Hungarian ethnic group). The population consisted of Romanians, Hungarians (particularly Székelys) and Germans. The majority of the present population is Romanian, but large minorities (mainly Hungarian and Roma) preserve their traditions. However, as recently as the Romanian communist era, ethnic-minority relations remained an issue of international contention. This has abated (but not disappeared) since the Revolution of 1989. Transylvania retains a significant Hungarian-speaking minority, slightly less than half of which identify themselves as Székely. Ethnic Germans in Transylvania (known there as Saxons) comprise about one percent of the population; however, Austrian and German influences remain in the architecture and urban landscape of much of Transylvania.

The region's history may be traced through the religions of its inhabitants. For the first time in history, the Diet of Torda in 1568 declared freedom of religion. There was no state religion, while in other parts of Europe and the world religious wars were fought. The Roman Catholic, Lutheran, Calvinist, and Unitarian Churches and religions were declared to be fully equal, and the Romanian Orthodox religion was tolerated. Most Romanians in Transylvania belong to the Eastern Orthodox Church faith, but from the 18th to the 20th centuries the Romanian Greek-Catholic Church also had substantial influence. Hungarians primarily belong to the Roman Catholic or Reformed Churches; a smaller number are Unitarians. Of the ethnic Germans in Transylvania, the Saxons have primarily been Lutheran since the Reformation; however, the Danube Swabians are Catholic. The Baptist Union of Romania is the second-largest such body in Europe; Seventh-day Adventists are established, and other evangelical churches have been a growing presence since 1989. No Muslim communities remain from the era of the Ottoman invasions. As elsewhere, anti-Semitic 20th century politics saw Transylvania's once sizable Jewish population greatly reduced by the Holocaust and emigration.

== Name of Transylvania ==
The earliest known reference to Transylvania appears in a Medieval Latin document of the Kingdom of Hungary in 1075 as "ultra silvam", in the Gesta Hungarorum as "terra ultrasilvana", meaning "land beyond the forest" ("terra" means land, "ultra" means "beyond" or "on the far side of" and the accusative case of "silva", "silvam" means "woods, forest"). Transylvania, with an alternative Latin prepositional prefix, means "on the other side of the woods". The Hungarian form Erdély was first mentioned in the Gesta Hungarorum as "Erdeuelu". The Medieval Latin form "Ultrasylvania", later Transylvania, was a direct translation from the Hungarian form "Erdőelve" ("erdő" means "forest" and "elve" means "beyond" in old Hungarian). That also was used as an alternative name in German "Überwald" ("über" means "beyond" and "wald" means forest) in the 13th–14th centuries. The earliest known written occurrence of the Romanian name Ardeal appeared in a document in 1432 as "Ardeliu". The Romanian Ardeal is derived from the Hungarian Erdély. Erdelj in Serbian and Croatian, Erdel in Turkish were borrowed from this form as well.

According to the Romanian linguist Nicolae Drăganu, the Hungarian name of Transylvania evolved over time from Erdőelü, Erdőelv, Erdőel, Erdeel in chronicles and written charters from 1200 up to late 1300. In written sources from 1390, we can find also the form Erdel, which can be read also as Erdély. There is evidence for that in the written Wallachian Chancellery Charters expressed in Slavonic where the word appears as Erûdelû (1432), Ierûdel, Ardelîu (1432), ardelski (1460, 1472, 1478–1479, 1480, 1498, 1507–1508, 1508), erdelska, ardelska (1498). With the first texts written in Romanian (1513) the name Ardeal appears to be written. Drăganu claims that the greatest Romanian philologists and historians maintain that Ardeal came from Hungarian.

== Ancient history ==
=== Scythians ===
According to the archaeological evidence, Transylvania was ruled by several proto-Scythian groups, but the first of which we know by name were the Agathyrsi.

Herodotus gives an account of the Agathyrsi, who lived in Transylvania during the fifth century BCE. He described them as a luxurious people who enjoyed wearing gold ornaments. Herodotus also claimed that the Agathyrsi held their wives in common, so all men would be brothers.

The Agathyrsi, later partly assimilated into the Dacians.

=== Dacian states ===
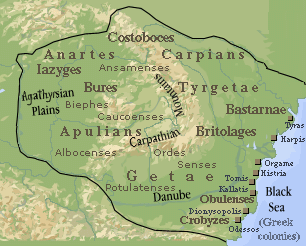
Dacian kingdom during the rule of Burebista (82 BCE)

A kingdom of Dacia existed at least as early as the early second century BCE under King Oroles. Under Burebista, the foremost king of Dacia and a contemporary of Julius Caesar, the kingdom reached its maximum extent. The area now constituting Transylvania was the political center of Dacia.

The Dacians are often mentioned by Augustus, according to whom they were compelled to recognize Roman supremacy. However, they were not subdued and in later times crossed the frozen Danube during winter and ravaging Roman cities in the recently acquired Roman province of Moesia.

The Dacians built several important fortified cities, among them Sarmizegetusa (near the present Hunedoara). They were divided into two classes: the aristocracy (tarabostes) and the common people (comati).

=== Roman-Dacian Wars ===
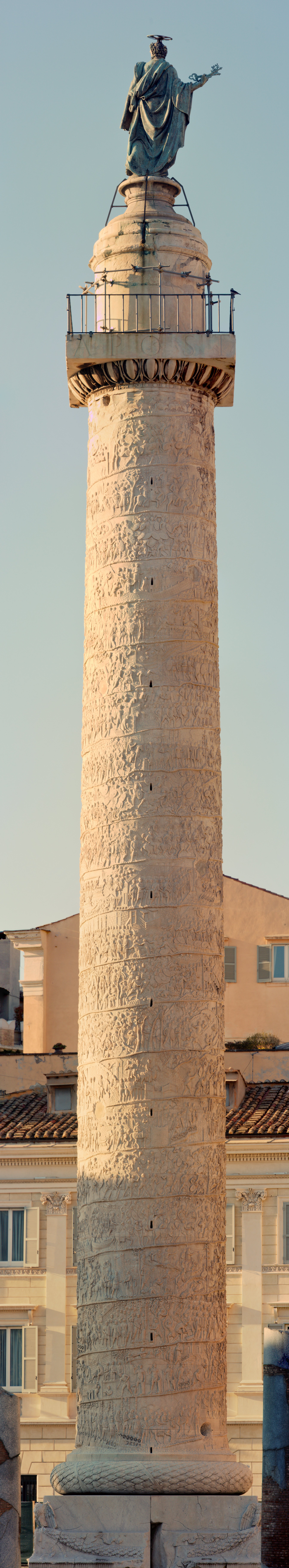
Trajan's Column in Rome

The Roman Empire expansion in the Balkans brought the Dacians into open conflict with Rome. During the reign of Decebalus, the Dacians were engaged in several wars with the Romans from 85 to 89 CE. After two reverses, the Romans gained an advantage but were obliged to make peace due to the defeat of Domitian by the Marcomanni. Domitian agreed to pay large sums (eight million sesterces) in annual tribute to the Dacians for maintaining peace.

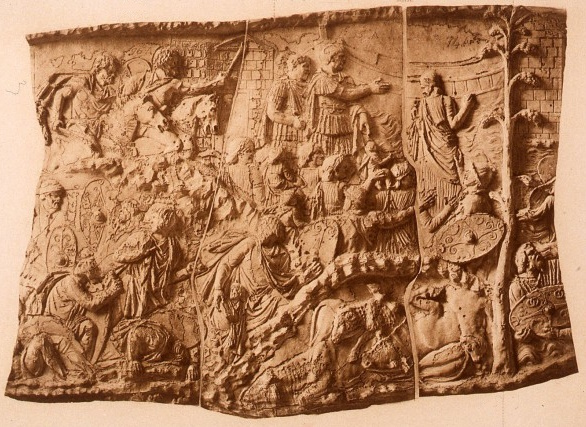
29th and 30th scenes from Trajan's Column. Infantry attack the Dacians, who flee while riders torch their settlement. Amidst the chaos, Trajan compassionately gestures to a woman holding her child

In 101, the emperor Trajan began a military campaign against the Dacians, which included a siege of Sarmizegetusa Regia and the occupation of part of the country. Estimates give a total of 90,000 soldiers represented by 7 legions, 24 cohorts of auxiliary cavalry and more than 70 cohorts of auxiliary infantry. The Romans prevailed but Decebalus was left as a client king under a Roman protectorate and the territories outside the Carpathian arch were occupied by the Romans. The peace lasted only 3 years and Trajan quickly began a new campaign against Decebalus (105–106). The battle for Sarmizegetusa Regia took place in the early summer of 106 with the participation of the II Adiutrix and IV Flavia Felix legions and a detachment (vexillatio) from the Legio VI Ferrata. The city was set on fire, the pillars of the sacred sanctuaries were cut down and the fortification system was destroyed; however, the war continued. Decebalus' dramatic flee, ended days later with the former king taking his own life. Through the treason of Bacilis (a confidant of the Dacian king), the Romans found Decebalus' treasure in the Strei River(estimated by Jerome Carcopino as 165,500 kg of gold and 331,000 kg of silver). The last battle with the army of the Dacian king took place at Napoca.

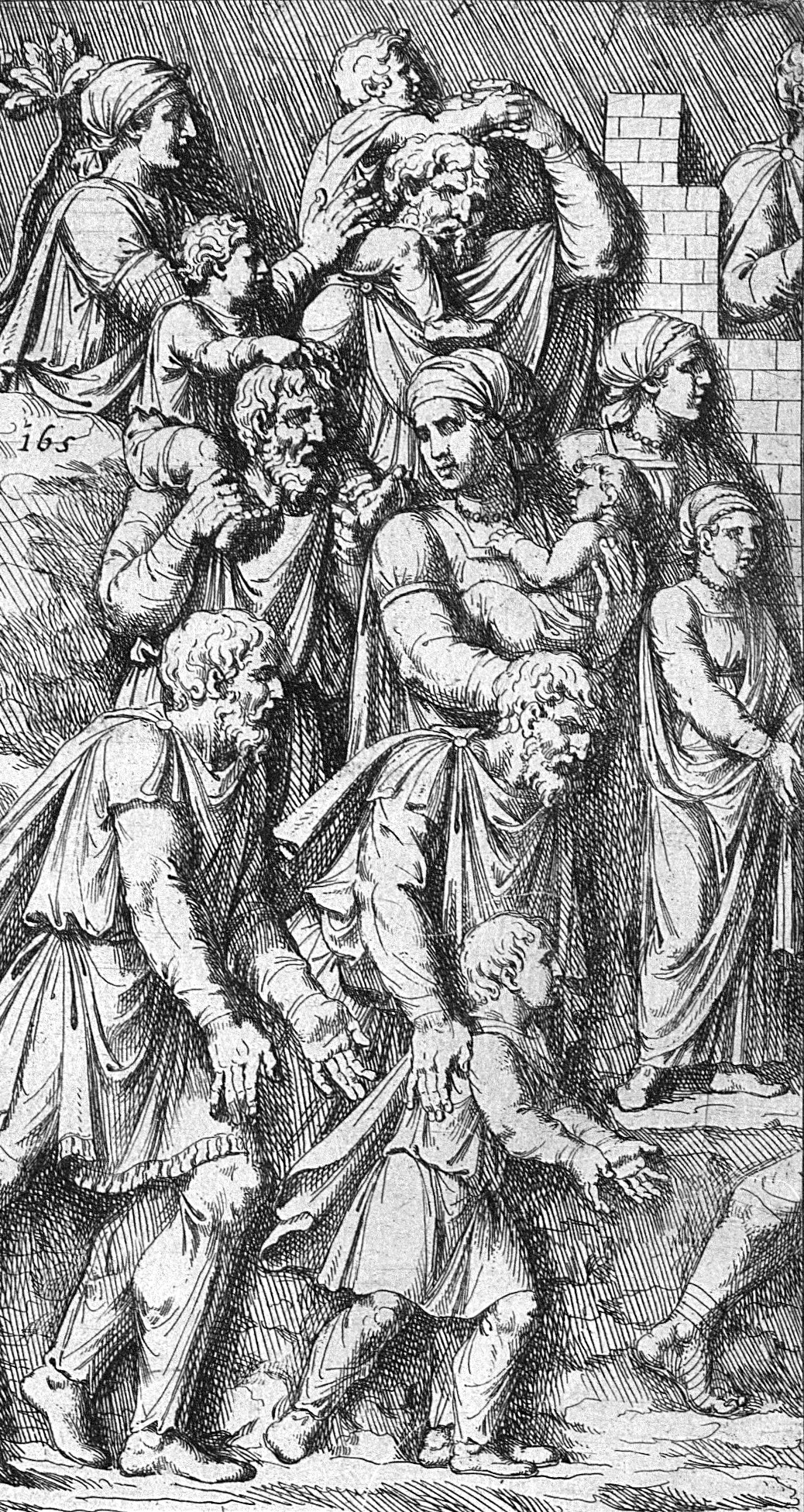
Population of Dacia represented on Trajan's Column

Dacian culture encouraged its soldiers to not fear death, and it was said that they left for war merrier than for any other journey. In his retreat to the mountains, Decebalus was followed by Roman cavalry led by Tiberius Claudius Maximus. The Dacian religion of Zalmoxis permitted suicide as a last resort by those in pain and misery, and the Dacians who heard Decebalus' last speech dispersed and committed suicide. Only the king tried to retreat from the Romans, hoping that he could find in the mountains and forests the means to resume battle, but "Maximus's cavalry pursued him like the furies". After they almost caught him, Decebalus committed suicide by slashing his throat with his sword (falx).The history of the Dacian Wars was written by Cassius Dio, and it is also depicted on Trajan's Column in Rome.

While ancient sources report the total extermination of the Dacian people, the conquest had a drastic impact on the demography of the region. Large parts of the population were enslaved, killed or expelled during the war. Settlers from around the empire repopulated the area.

Following the war, several parts of Dacia including Transylvania were organized into the Roman province of Dacia Traiana.

=== Roman Dacia ===
The newly formed province of Dacia incorporate the areas south and southeast of Carpathians that were previously added to Moesia. Two major military centres were established at Berzobis and Apulum with additional forts of auxiliary troops in strategic locations such as Tibiscum and Porolissum, comprising some 35000 stationed soldiers. Major works of infrastructure were undertaken to connect the newly established urban and military centres such as the road from Potaissa to Napoca, and the Trajan's Bridge was built in the preparation part of the conquest. During the time of the second governor of Dacia, Terentius Scaurianus, a new colony was set on the western edge of Hațeg Plain with colonists mainly from the Italian peninsula, colonia Ulpia Traiana Augusta Dacica Sarmizegetusa, taking from the name of the old Dacian capital and acting as the governor's residence (later moved to Apulum).

Roman Dacia

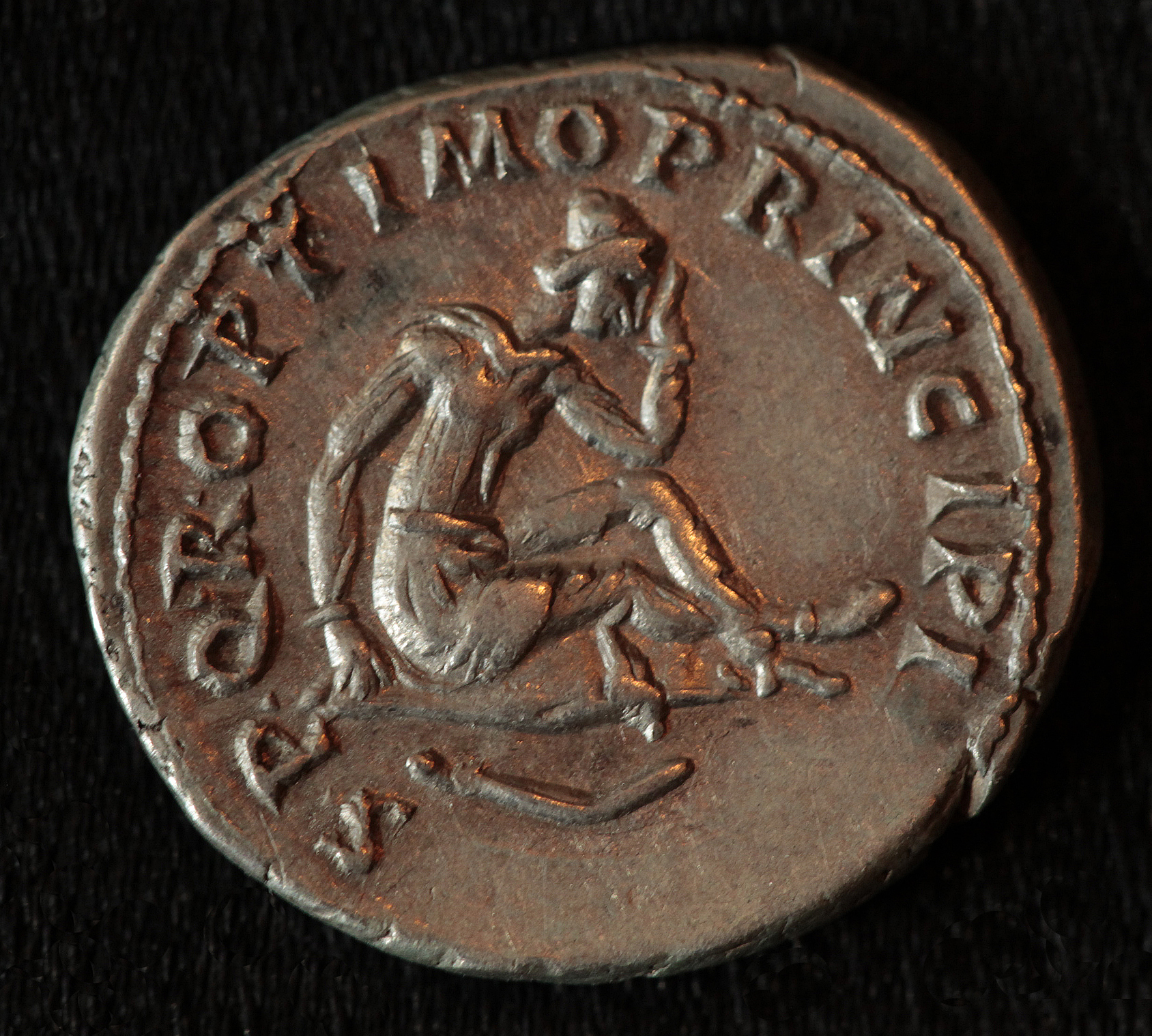
Reverse of Roman denarius from Trajan's rule depicting a defeated Dacian

Rural settlements of the vicus and villa types were established, many connected to military sites. Archaeological finds show most are of Roman type, including material culture such as tools and ovens of the lower classes. Roman administration took control of the salt trade route that served the neighbouring territories of Pannonia and Upper Moesia, and the placement of the new towns suggests they were established in part to exploit the gold and iron mines of southwest Transylvanian region, and it at least partially reflects the pattern of depopulation from the Dacian Wars. The colonists settled by official initiative were mostly veterans of various legions with a significant addition of Illyrian miners, while the private enterprise was a diverse mixture of Roman citizens from places such as Galatia, Palmyra, Gallia, along with slaves and peregrini.

Dacia province was among the last region which was conquered by the Roman Empire, and among the first which was abandoned. In less than 170 years, the Romans built 10 cities, more than 400 military buildings of which 100 legionary or auxiliary forts, left over 4000 inscriptions and thousands traces of material culture.

During the third century, increasing pressure from the Free Dacians and Visigoths forced the Romans to abandon Dacia Traiana.

According to historian Eutropius in Liber IX of his Breviarum, in 271, Roman citizens from Dacia Traiana were resettled by the Roman emperor Aurelian across the Danube in the newly established Dacia Aureliana, inside former Moesia Superior:

Aurelian gave up the province of Dacia, which Trajan had created beyond the Danube, since the whole of Illyricum and Moesia had been devastated and he despaired of being able to retain it, and he withdrew the Romans from the cities and countryside of Dacia, and resettled them in the middle of Moesia and named it Dacia, which now divides the two Moeasias and is on the right bank of the Danube as it flows to the sea, whereas previously it was on the left.

— Eutropius, Breviarium historiae romana – Liber IX, XV

In the same work, Etropius describes the people who lived in the region in his time, and gives a description of the ethnic composition of the area.

"He rebuilt some cities in Germany; he subdued Dacia by the overthrow of Decebalus, and formed a province beyond the Danube, in that territory which the Thaiphali, Victoali, and Theruingi now occupy. This province was a thousand miles in circumference."

==== Daco-Roman continuity theory ====
Conflicting theories exist concerning whether or not the Romanians are a Romanized Dacian population that, surviving the Migration Period, remained in Transylvania after the withdrawal of the Romans.

=== Migration Period ===
==== Goths ====
Before their withdrawal the Romans negotiated an agreement with the Goths in which Dacia remained Roman territory, and a few Roman outposts remained north of the Danube. The Thervingi, a Visigothic tribe, settled in the southern part of Transylvania, and the Ostrogoths lived on the Pontic–Caspian steppe.

About 340, Ulfilas brought Acacian Arianism to the Goths in Guthiuda, and the Visigoths (and other Germanic tribes) became Arians.

The Goths were able to defend their territory for about a century against the Gepids, Vandals and Sarmatians; however, the Visigoths were unable to preserve the region's Roman infrastructure. Transylvania's gold mines were unused during the Early Middle Ages.

The Gothic presence in the area of Transylvania starts from the second half of the third century, after the Roman army withdrawal, a continued over the forth century. At the end of this the Gothic tribes left Transylvania, the settlements were abandoned without signs of destruction.

This is how Theophanes Confessor describes the area under Gothic rule:

There were at that time numerous extremely large Gothic tribes living beyond the Danube in the districts to the far north. Of these, four are particularly worthy of note, namely the Goths, the Visigoths, the Gepids, and the Vandals, who differ from one another in name alone and speak the same dialect. They all subscribe to the Arian heresy. After crossing the Danube in the time of Arkadios and Honorius, they were settled on Roman territory.

==== Huns ====
By 376 a new wave of migratory people, the Huns, led by Uldin defeated and expelled the Visigoths, setting up their own headquarters in what was Dacia Inferior. Hoping to find refuge from the Huns, Fritigern (a Visigothic leader) appealed to the Roman emperor Valens in 376 to be allowed to settle with his people on the south bank of the Danube. However, a famine broke out and Rome was unable to supply them with food or land. As a result, the Goths rebelled against the Romans for several years. The Huns fought the Alans, Vandals, and Quadi, forcing them toward the Roman Empire. Pannonia became the centre during the peak of Attila's reign (435–453).

The race of Huns, long shut off by inaccessible mountains, broke out in sudden rage against the Goths and drove them in widespread confusion from their old homes. The Goths fled across the Danube and were received by Valens without negotiating any treaty.- Paulus Orosius: Histories against the Pagans

Dating from 425 to 455, the Transylvanian traces of the Huns lie in the lowlands of the Mureș valley. The most important testimonies of the Hun rule are the two separate sets of coins discovered at Sebeș. Between the 420s and 455, Hun princes and lords established summer residences in Transylvania. The newest discoveries strengthens the theory that there was a more serious Hun military presence in Transylvania.

== Middle Ages ==
=== Early Middle Ages: the great migrations ===
==== Spread of Christianity ====
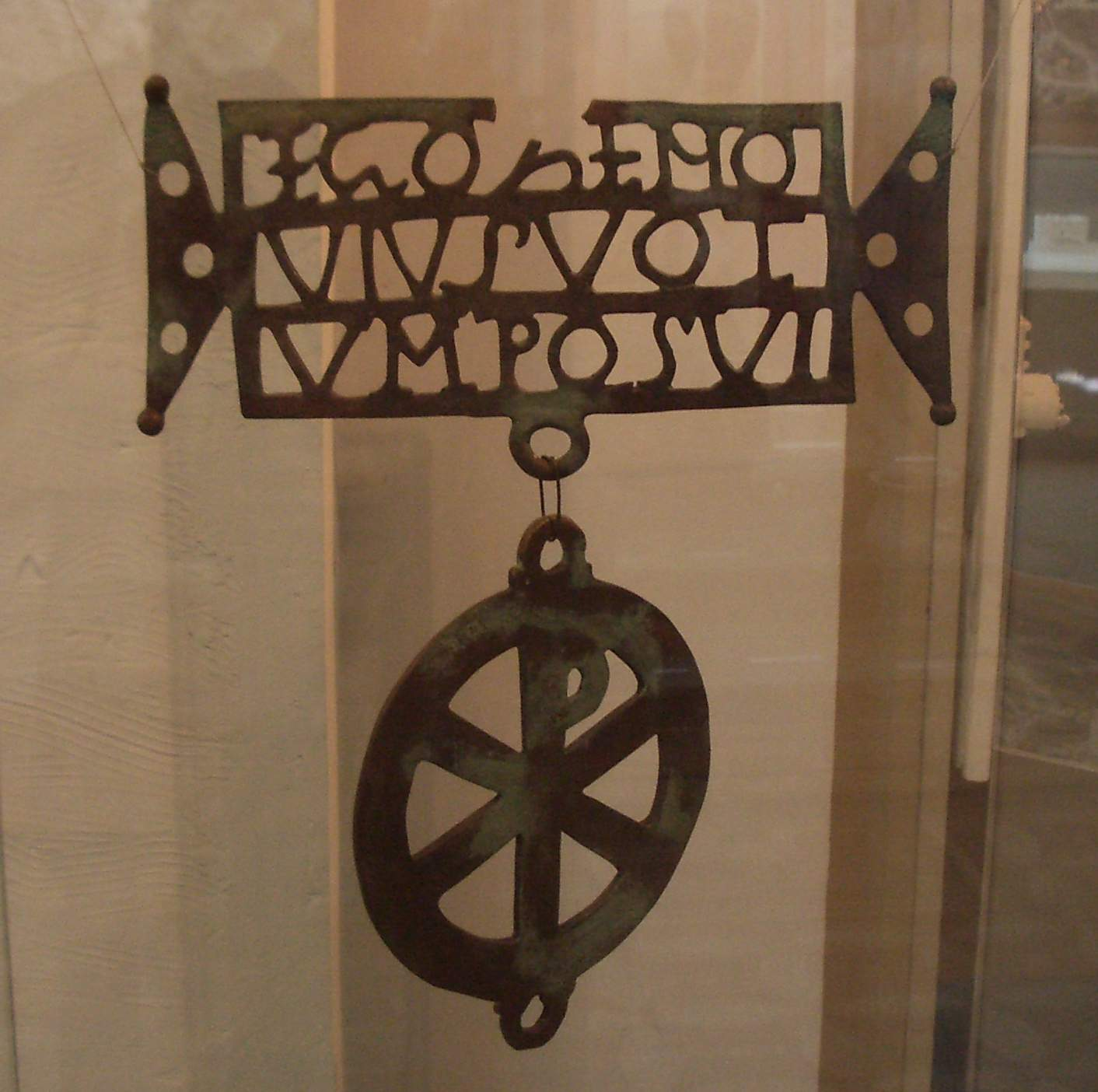
The bronze Biertan Donarium, an early Christian votive object of the early fourth century, consisting of a medallion with a Chi-Rho and a plaque bearing an inscription: "EGO ZENOVIVS VOTVM POSVI" ("I, Zenovius, offered this gift").

Sparse archeological findings from the 4th century (Biertan Donarium, a clay pot with Christian symbols from Moigrad, and another clay pot with Chi Rho monogram at the bottom from Ulpia Traiana for example) point at minor Christian communities isolated from the main group.

The Biertan Donarium was found in 1775. There are two theories on the origins of this artifact. According to the supporters of the Daco-Romanian continuity theory this donarium was made by the survivor Latin-speaking Christian population population of Dacia following the Aurelian Retreat. Those historians who are sceptic about this object point to the dubious circumstances of this finding. They emphasize that there were no Roman settlements or Christian churches near to Biertan. According to them this object was made in Aquileia in Northern Italy during the 4th century and it was carried into Transylvania as a loot by Gothic warriors or by trading. It is the most possible that the find from Biertan is a result of plundering in Illyricum or Pannonia or in the Balkans anytime between the fourth and the sixth century and this artifact was reused as a pagan object by its new owners. Originally it was intended to be hung from a candelabrum but the perforations made later indicate it was reused and attached to a coffer for storing vessels or other goods. According to this opinion even its usage for Christian purposes should be questioned in the territory of Transylvania.

It is only in the 5th century that the artefacts become more common, most of them in the form of oil lamps, gold rings with cross incisions (from the tomb of Omahar in Apahida), a chest piece with Christian symbols. From the 6th century, associated with the missionary work supported by Justinian I and confirmed by their Byzantine provenance, the oil lamps become even more common, accompanied by two ampullae with the representation of Saint Menas, and several moulds for cross shaped pendants.

In the context of Khan Boris I conversion to Christianity and the baptism of Bulgarians, the Byzantine type of church organization is identified in the region. Historian I. Baán, discussing the origin of Kalocsa archdiocese, pointed that the existence of two archdioceses in the early days of Kingdom of Hungary is connected with parallel work undertaken by missionaries from both the Eastern and the Western churches. He identifies archdiocese of Kalocsa with "archdiocese of Tourkia" and lists in its suborder the dioceses of Transylvania, Banat, and Cenad. The baptism of Gyula II in Constantinople and his accompaniment by bishop Hierotheos lead to the deduction that the diocese of Transylvania was established before 1018. From this reasoning a diocese of Transylvania, subordinated to the Patriarchate of Constantinople, could be dated to the time of Géza. His reasoning is sustained by the discovery in 2011 at Alba Iulia of a church built in Eastern tradition, and dated between the second half of the 10th century and first half of the 11th century. During the rule of Ahtum (baptised in Vidin) in Banat, towards the end of 10th century, a monastery of Eastern rite monks was active in Cenad.

==== Gepids ====
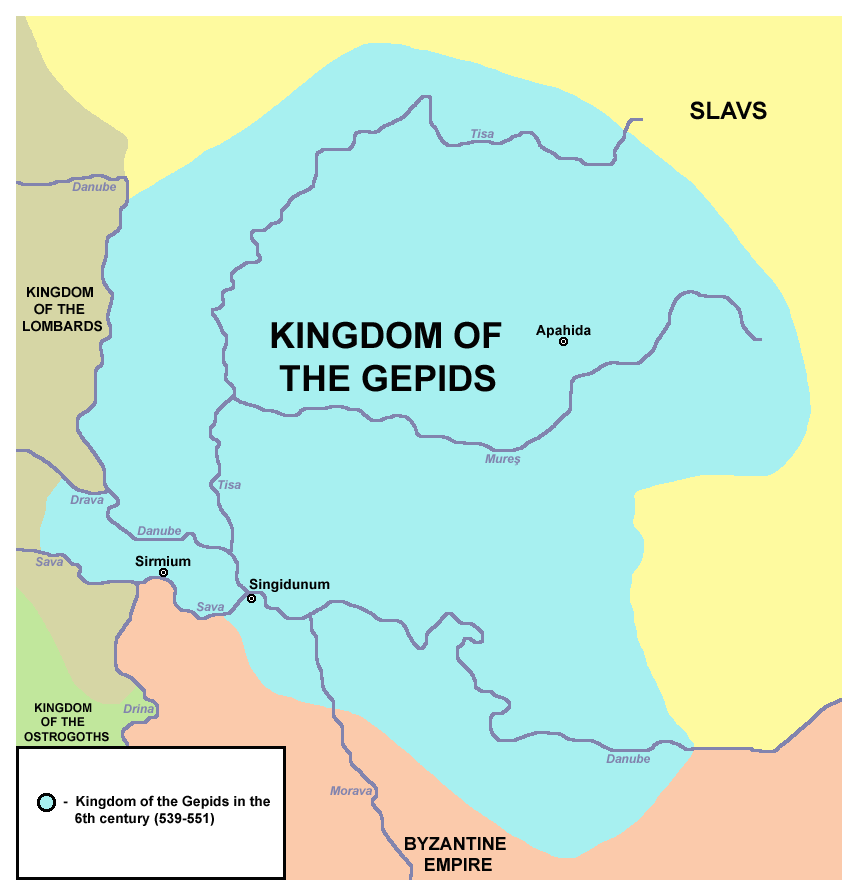
Kingdom of the Gepids in the 6th century (539–551)

After Attila's death, the Hunnic empire disintegrated. In 455 the Gepids (under king Ardarich) conquered Pannonia, allowing them to settle for two centuries in Transylvania. The Gepids secured their rule by attacking and ravaging their neighbors' territories and creating military border zones, while themselves remaining in Transylvania proper, surrounded by hard terrain. On one occasion in 539, cooperating with the Franks they crossed the Danube and devastated Moesia, killing magister millitum Calluc. They weren't this lucky with the Ostrogoths, who first routed the united forces of Gepids, Suebians, Scirians and Sarmatians at the Battle of Bolia, than at the Battle of Sirmium. King Thraustila lost the city and his successors failed to recapture even after Theodoric's death. After a long decline, Gepidia finally fell to the joint invasion of the Avars and Lombards in 567. Very few Gepid sites (such as cemeteries in the Banat region) after 600 remain; they were apparently assimilated by the Avar empire.

This is how Jordanes describes the territory of Dacia, under the Gepids, and the times before that:

"I mean ancient Dacia, which the race of the Gepidae now possesses. This country lies across the Danube within sight of Moesia, and is surrounded by a crown of mountains. It has only two ways of access, one by way of Boutae and the other by Tapae. This Gothia, which our ancestors called Dacia and now, as I have said, is called Gepidia, was then bounded on the east by the Roxolani, on the west by the Iazyges, on the north by the Sarmatians and Basternae and on the south by the river Danube. The lazyges are separated from the Roxolani by the Aluta river only."

Romanian scholars that specialise in the period, along with other specialists in the field such as Walter Goffart, generally reject the reliability of Jordanes's description of Gepid ethnic identity, their migration to the area - including what would later be known as Transylvania, and the report on their statal organization, arguing that archaeological evidence does not match with the literary source.

==== Avars, Slavs, Bulgars ====
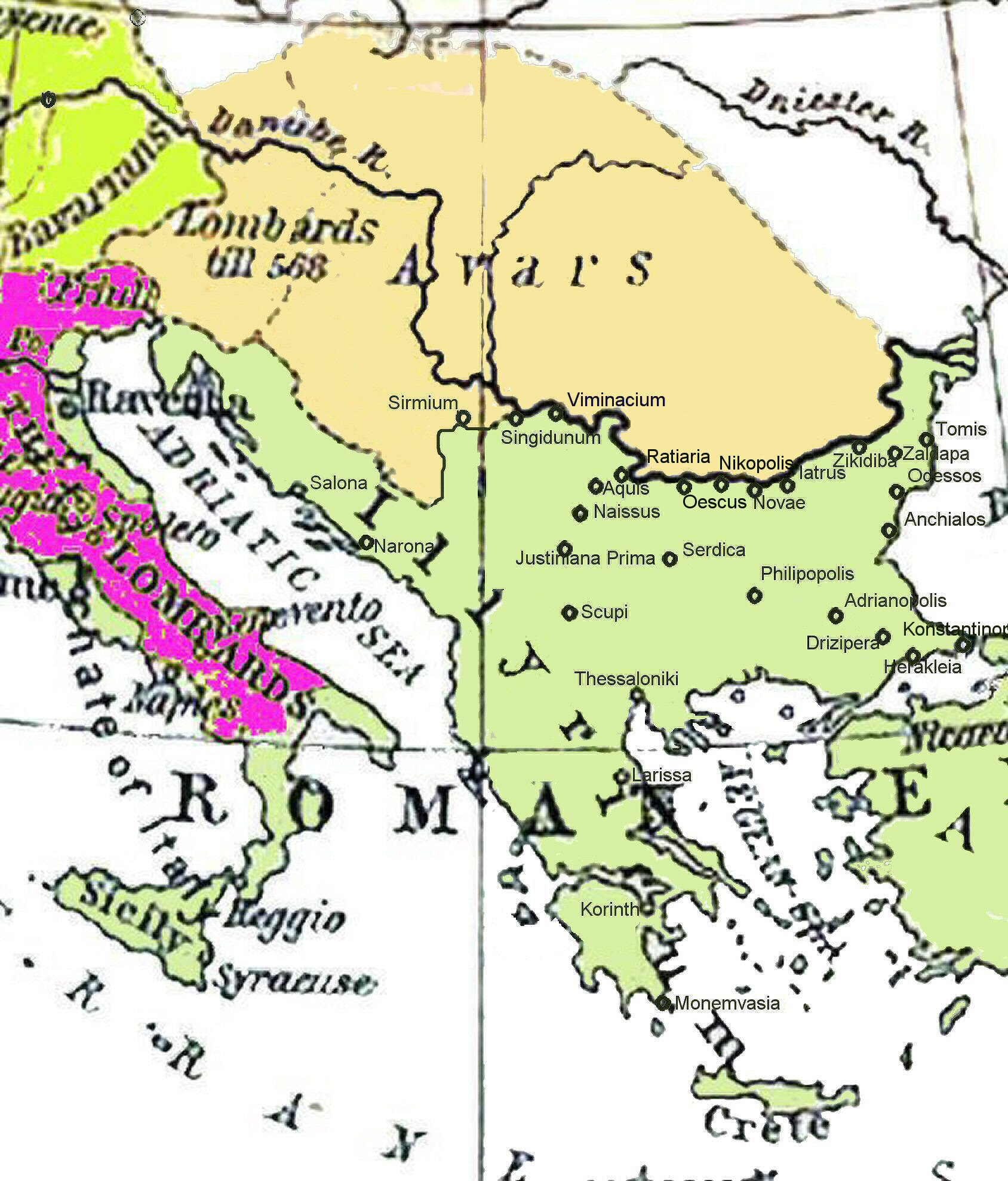
The Avar Khaganate around 582–612

In 568, the Avars, under Khagan Bayan I established an empire in the Carpathian Basin that lasted for 250 years. In the beginning, the Avar Khaganate controlled a larger territory which expanded from the Carpathian Basin to the Pontic-Caspian Steppe and dominated numerous people. The Onogur-Bulgars fought their independence in the middle 7th century and the Avar Khaganate was shrunken to the area of the Carpathian Basin. Related peoples from the east arrived in the Avar Kaganate several times: around 595 the Kutrigurs, and then around 670 the Onogurs. The Ravenna Cosmography, written around 700, describes the area as follows:

"And in front of this same Albis is the land called Lesser Dacia, and beyond it to the side is the large and spacious land called Greater Dacia, which is now referred to as Gepidia; currently, the people of the Unorum [Avars] are known to inhabit it. Beyond that is Illyricum, which extends as far as the province of Dalmatia."

The region of Transylvania was an important site in the Byzantine-Avar wars. Byzantine ambassadors often appeared in the area to try to persuade the various peoples living in Transylvania to form an alliance. Theophanes the Confessor recounts one such diplomatic mission as follows:

"As for Sarbaros, he dispatched him with his remaining army against Constantinople with a view to establishing an alliance between the western Huns (who are called Avars) and the Bulgars, Slavs, and Gepids, and so advancing on the City and laying siege to it."

Charlemagne started a Frankish campaign against the Avars in 791. The Avar Khaganate had a catastrophic civil war in 795 where the higher-ranking jugurrus who ruled the eastern regions and Transylvania was defeated and the Avars themselves decimated their ruling class in Transylvania. The Franks renewed their attacks in 795–796. Krum, the Bulgar khan also attacked the Avars, his army advanced into the Tisza region in 803. The Avars were defeated by the Franks and Bulgars in 803, and their steppe-empire ended around 822. The Transylvanian Avars were subjugated by the Bulgars under Khan Krum at the beginning of the ninth century, after which the region was partially occupied by fleeing Slavs, who sought for protection from the Franks. Southern Transylvania was conquered by the First Bulgarian Empire which took control of its salt distribution network, most of it directed towards the early medieval site of Szolnok from where it was distributed further in Europe. In the Royal Frankish Annals, it is described that at that time in Transylvania, there were Avars and a Slavic tribe called the Obodrites, also called the Predecentes, and Bulgars lived next to them.

The downfall of the Avar Khaganate at the beginning of the 9th century did not mean the extinction of the Avar population, contemporary written sources report surviving Avar groups. The Hungarian conquerors together with the Turkic-speaking Kabars integrated the Avars, Onogurs and Slavonic groups. The conquering Hungarians mixed to varying degrees on individual level with the Avar population living in the Carpathian Basin, but they had Avar genetic heritage as well.

The Slavs settled in some regions in Transylvania from the 7th century, and left traces up to the end of the 12th century. The occurrence of Early Slavs in the region (by some historians as early as the second half of the 6th century) followed two general directions: one from the south, along the Olt river valley, and one from the north-west (upper Tisza) along the Crasna river valley. No evidence has been found to sustain a movement along the Mureș valley as well during this time. A third direction of entry was noted after the second half of the 7th century from the north-east. It should be noted, however, that the arrival and expansion of Slavic speaking population in the current territory or Romania is a debated topic and that the current understanding in Romanian academic circles is that some archaeological finds usually associated with migrating Slavs are no longer valid, for example the sunken-floored buildings of the Ipotești–Cândești culture which were found also in southern Transylvania after the sixth century and were considered indicative of Slavic culture existed in the region even before the supposed Slav migration. Anania Shirakatsi, a 7th-century Armenian historian, describes Transylvania inhabited by the Slavs in his geography as follows:

"On the south side is Thrace proper and on the north side the large country of Dacia, where dwell the Slavs who form twenty-five tribes, in whose place invaded the Goths, who came from the island of Scandia which is called Emios by the Germans."

==== Hungarians ====
The Hungarian conquest of the Carpathian Basin (Chronicon Pictum, 1358)

Foundation of the Hungarian state is connected to the Hungarian conquerors, who arrived from the Pontic Steppe in the frame of a strong centralized steppe-empire under the leadership of Grand Prince Álmos and his son Árpád The Hungarians arrived in the Carpathian Basin, in a geographically unified but politically divided land, after acquiring thorough local knowledge of the area from the 860s onwards. After the end of the Avar Kaganate (c. 822), the Eastern Franks asserted their influence in Transdanubia, the Bulgarians to a small extent in the Southern Transylvania and the interior regions housed the surviving Avar population in their stateless state. The Avar population survived the time of the Hungarian conquest of the Carpathian Basin. In this power the Hungarian conqueror elite took the system of the former Avar Kaganate, there is no trace of massacres and mass graves, it is believed to have been a peaceful transition for local residents in the Carpathian Basin. Based on genetics evidence, the Hungarian conquerors had Ugric ancestry and later admixed with Sarmatians and Huns. There is a genetic continuity from the Bronze Age, a continuous migration of the Steppe folks from east to the Carpathian Basin. The contemporary local population is descended from previous peoples of the Carpathian Basin, and a large number of people survived to the 10th century from the previous Avar period. The local population started admixing only in the second half of the 10th century with the conquering Hungarians.

In 862, Prince Rastislav of Moravia rebelled against the Franks, and after hiring Hungarian troops, won his independence; this was the first time that Hungarians expeditionary troops entered the Carpathian Basin. In 862, Archbishop Hincmar of Reims records the campaign of unknown enemies called "Ungri", giving the first mention of the Hungarians in Western Europe. In 881, the Hungarian forces fought together with the Kabars in the Vienna Basin. According to historian György Szabados and archeologist Miklós Béla Szőke, a group of Hungarians were already living in the Carpathian Basin at that time, so they could quickly intervene in the events of the Carolingian Empire. The number of recorded battles increased from the end of the 9th century. In the late Avar period, a part of Hungarians was already present in the Carpathian Basin in the 9th century, this has been supported by genetic and archaeological research, because there are graves in which Avar descendants are buried in Hungarian clothes. An important segment of this Avar era Hungarians is that the Hungarian county system of King Saint Stephen I may be largely based on the power centers formed during the Avar period.

The Hungarians took possession of the Carpathian Basin in a pre-planned manner, with a long move-in between 862 and 895. This is confirmed by the archaeological findings, in the 10th century Hungarian cemeteries, the graves of women, children and elderly people are located next to the warriors, they were buried according to the same traditions, wore the same style of ornaments, and belonged to the same anthropological group. According to genetic evidence, Hungarian conqueror's men and women came to the Carpathian Basin together. The Hungarian military events of the following years prove that the Hungarian population that settled in the Carpathian Basin was not a weakened population without a significant military power. Other theories assert that the move of the Hungarians was forced or at least hastened by the joint attacks of Pechenegs and Bulgarians. According to eleventh-century tradition, the road taken by the Hungarians under Prince Álmos took them first to Transylvania in 895. This is supported by an eleventh-century Russian tradition that the Hungarians moved to the Carpathian Basin by way of Kiev. Prince Álmos, the sacred leader of the Hungarian Great Principality died before he could reach Pannonia, he was sacrificed in Transylvania. According to Romanian historian Florin Curta, no evidence exists of Magyars crossing Eastern Carpathian Mountains into Transylvania.

The De Administrando Imperio recounts the relations of the surrounding regions, including Transylvania, following the Hungarian conquest as follows:

"Such are the landmarks and names along the Danube river; but the regions above these, which comprehend the whole settlement of Turkey [Hungary], they now call after the names of the rivers that flow there. The rivers are these: the first river is the Timisis, the second river the Toutis, the third river the Morisis, the fourth river the Krisos, and again another river, the Titza. Neighbours of the Turks [Hungarians] are, on the eastern side the Bulgarians, where the river Istros, also called Danube, runs between them; on the northern, the Pechenegs; on the western, the Franks; and on the southern, the Croats. These eight clans of the Turks [Hungarians] do not obey their own particular princes, but have a joint agreement to fight together with all earnestness and zeal upon the rivers, wheresoever war breaks out."

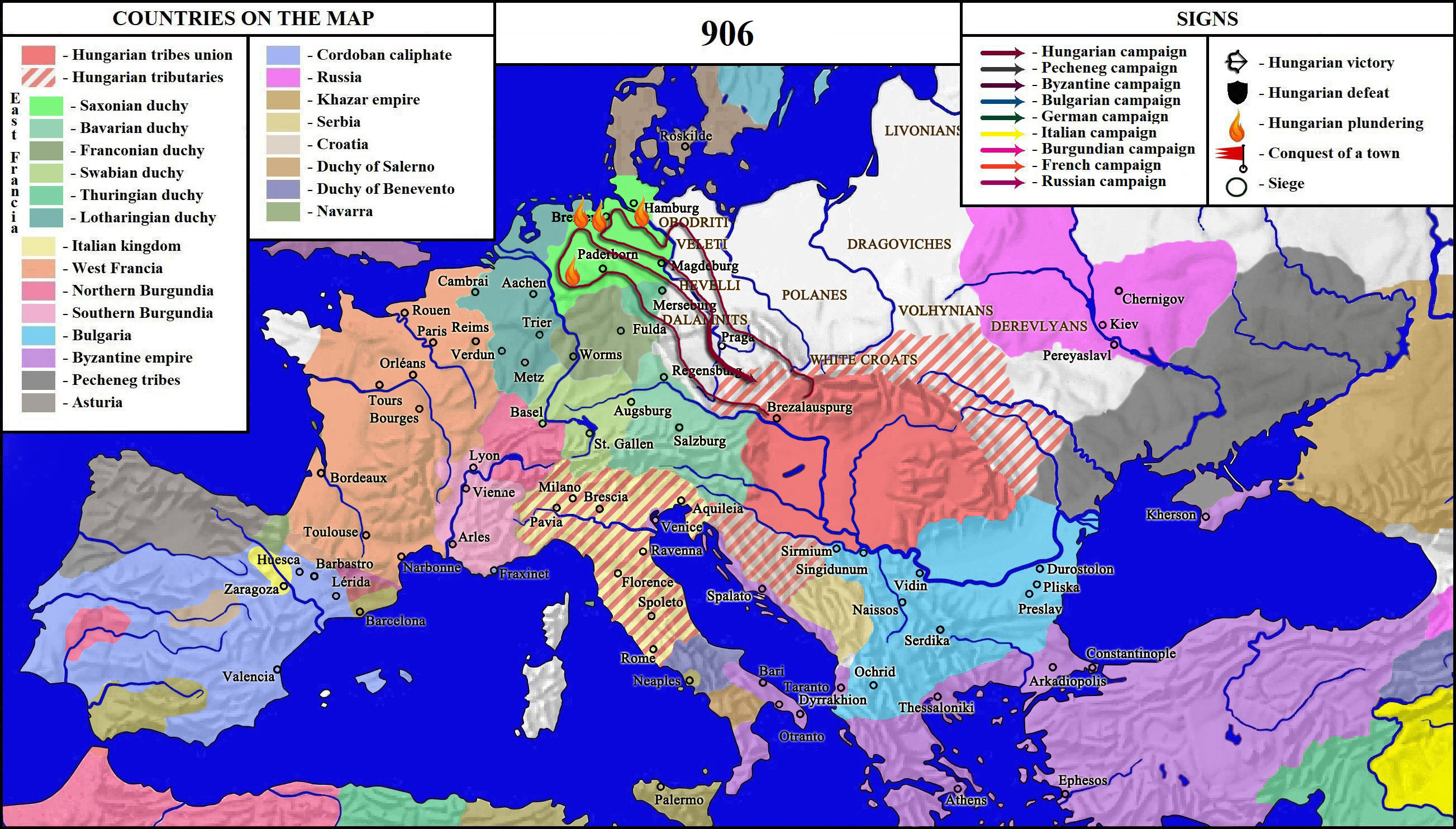
Hungarian campaigns in 906

According to supporters of the Daco-Roman continuity theory, Transylvania was populated by Romanians at the time of the Hungarian conquest. Opponents of this theory assert that Transylvania was sparsely inhabited by peoples of Slavic origin and Turkic people.

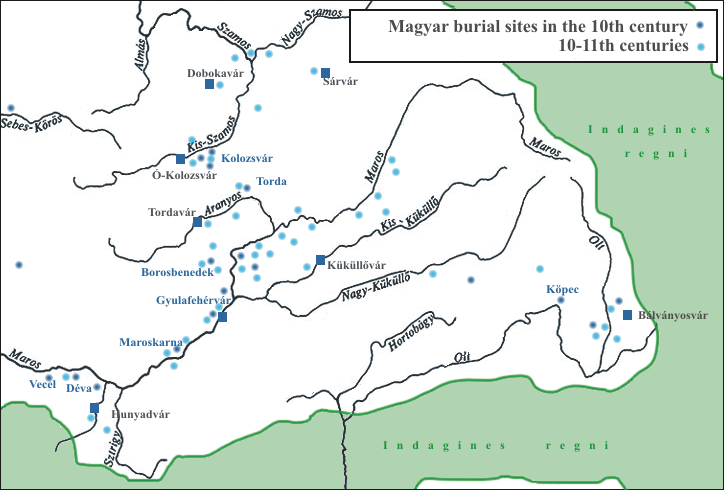
Hungarians burial sites in Transylvania in the 10th–11th centuries

The earliest Hungarian artifacts found in Transylvania date to the first half of the 10th century. The very typical feature of the Asian Hun and European Hun cemeteries is the partial horse burials, almost in all Hun graves there are only remain of horses. Outside the Huns, only the Hungarians used partial horse burials. This ancient tradition that went through centuries, it is easily identifiable in the Huns and Hungarians graves. Archeologists also found this kind of horse burial in Transylvania. During joint research, archaeologists from the University of Sibiu (Romania) and the University of Tübingen (Germany) excavated one of the most important Hungarian cemeteries from the time of the Hungarian conquest near Orăștie (Szászváros in Hungarian) in 2005. According to Romanian archeologist Marian Tiplic, the excavated graves refer to the second generation of Hungarian conquerors, the skeletons found here are the remains of the Gyula tribe. It was a permanent settlement, the location of which, on top of a hill, suggests that the goal of the Hungarian was to control the valley of the Mureș. Hungarian cemeteries from the 9th and 10th centuries were also unearthed at Cluj-Napoca (Kolozsvár in Hungarian), Gâmbaș (Marosgombás in Hungarian), and other Transylvanian sites. A coin minted under Berthold, Duke of Bavaria (reign 938–947) found near Turda indicates that Transylvanian Magyars participated in western military campaigns. Although their defeat in the 955 Battle of Lechfeld ended Magyar raids against western Europe, raids on the Balkan Peninsula continued until 970. Linguistic evidence suggests that after their conquest, the Magyars inherited the local social structures of the conquered Pannonian Slavs; in Transylvania, there was intermarriage between the Magyar ruling class and the Slavic élite.

Gyula's family ruled Transylvania from around 925 onwards. Gyula II was a Hungarian tribal leader in the middle of the 10th century. His capital was Gyulafehérvár (now Alba Iulia in Romania). The Hungarian name Gyulafehérvár is meaning "White Castle of the Gyula", the modern Romanian name Alba Iulia coming from the Medieval Latin name of the city which originated from the Hungarian form, although the old Romanian name Bălgrad, which originated from Slavic, similarly meant "White Castle". Gyula II descended from a family whose members held the hereditary title gyula, which was the second in rank among the leaders of the Hungarian Great Principality. Ioannes Skylitzes narrates that around 952 Gyula II visited Constantinople, where he was baptized, and Emperor Constantine VII lifted him from the baptismal font. A bishop named Hierotheos accompanied Gyula II back to Hungary. Hierotheos was the first bishop of Transylvania. Gyula II built the first church of Transylvania in Gyulafehérvár (now Alba Iulia in Romania) around 950, the ruins of the church were discovered in 2011. Sarolt, daughter of Gyula II was married to Géza, Grand Prince of the Hungarians around 970. Their son Vajk was born around 975, who became the first king of Hungary in 1000 as King Stephen I of Hungary.

===== Medieval Gesta Hungarorum and the Hungarian conquest of the Carpathian Basin =====
The enemies of the conquering Hungarians in the Gesta Hungarorum are not mentioned in other primary sources, consequently, historians debate whether Gelou, Glad, and Menumorut were a historical person or an imaginary figure created by Anonymus.

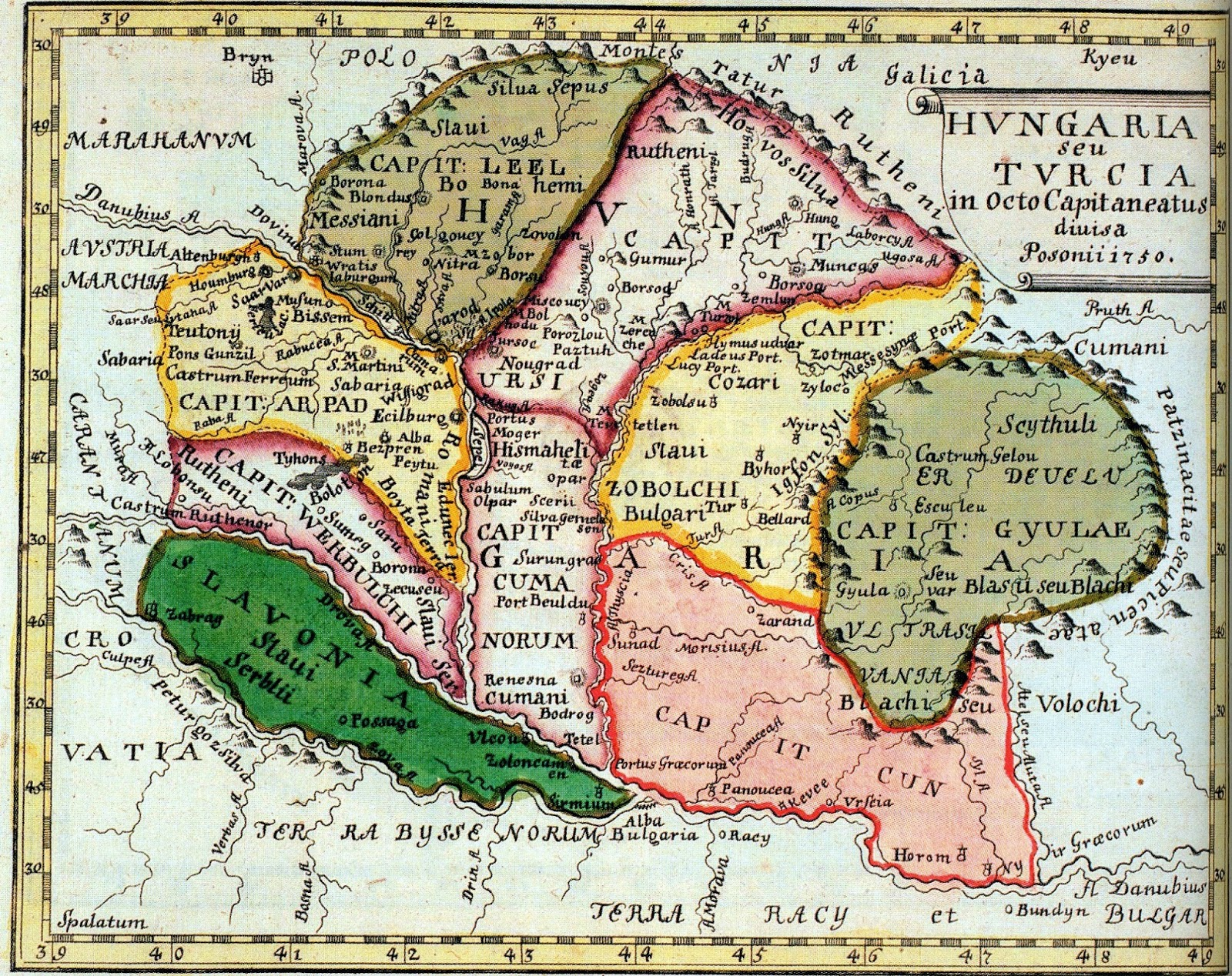
Map according to the Gesta Hungarorum (János Tomka Szászky, 1750)

Gelou (Hungarian: Gyalu, Romanian: Gelu) is a figure in the Gesta Hungarorum (Latin for The Deeds of the Hungarians), а medieval work written by an author known as "Anonymus" in the Hungarian royal court probably at the end of the 12th century (about 300 years after the Hungarian conquest, which was around 895). In the Gesta Hungarorum Gelou ruled part of Transylvania, he was described as "a certain Vlach" (quidam blacus) and "prince of the Vlachs" (ducem blacorum), inhabited his land by "Vlachs and Slavs" (blasij et sclaui). He was said to be defeated by one of the seven Hungarian dukes, Töhötöm (Tuhutum in the original Latin, also known as Tétény). Hungarian historians assert that Gelou was created by the author from the name of the village of Gyalu (today's Gilău in Romania), a Transylvanian village in the Mountains of Gyalu (today's Gilău Mountains in Romania), where Gelou died in the Gesta Hungarorum. Some Hungarian historians identify the Blaks (Blasii, Blaci) people with the Bulaqs.

Then Tuhutum, having heard of the goodness of that land, sent his envoys to Duke Árpád to ask his permission to go beyond the woods [ultra silvas] to fight Duke Gelou. Duke Árpád, having taken counsel, commended Tuhutum's wish and he gave him permission to go beyond the woods to fight Duke Gelou. When Tuhutum heard this from an envoy, he readied himself with his warriors and, having left his companions there, went forth eastwards beyond the woods against Gelou, duke of the Vlachs [blacorum]. Gelou, duke of Transylvania, hearing of his arrival, gathered his army and rode speedily towards him in order to stop him at the Meszes Gates, but Tuhutum, crossing the wood in one day, arrived at the Almás [Almas] river. Then both armies came upon each other, with the river lying between them. Duke Gelou planned to stop them there with his archers.

— Anonymus: Gesta Hungarorum

Glad (Hungarian: Galád) was the ruler of Banat at the time of the Hungarian conquest of the Carpathian Basin according to the Gesta Hungarorum. Glad came from Vidin in Bulgaria, he occupied the land from the river Mureș up to the castle of Orșova and Palanka with the help of the Cumans. According to Anonymus, Glad commanded a great army of horsemen and foot soldiers and his army was supported by Cumans, Bulgarians and Vlachs (blacorum). The Hungarians sent an army against him and Glad was defeated, his army was annihilated, two dukes of the Cumans and three kneses of the Bulgarians were slain in the battle. Hungarian historiography regards him as fictitious, along with many other imaginary enemy characters in the Gesta Hungarorum, he is also not mentioned in other primary sources. Anonymus's reference to the Cumans supporting Glad is one of the key points in the scholarly debate, because the Cumans did not arrive in Europe before the 1050s. In Romanian historiography, Glad is described as one of "the three Romanian dukes" who ruled the regions of present-day Romania in the early 10th century.

And because God with His grace went before the Hungarians, he gave them a great victory and their enemies fell before them as hay before reapers. And in that battle two dukes of the Cumans and three princes [kenezy] of the Bulgarians were slain, and Glad, their duke, escaped in flight but all his army, melting like wax before flame, was destroyed at the point of the sword. Then Zuard, Cadusa and Boyta, having won victory, setting forth from there, came to the borders of the Bulgarians and encamped beside the Ponoucea river. Duke Glad, having fled, as we said above, for fear of the Hungarians, entered Keve [Keuee] castle and, on the third day, Zuardu, Cadusa and Boyta, from whom the Brucsa kindred descends, having arranged their army began to fight against Keve castle.

— Anonymus: Gesta Hungarorum

Menumorut (Hungarian: Ménmarót) was the ruler of the lands between the rivers Mureș, Someș and Tisza at the time of the Hungarian conquest of the Carpathian Basin around 900. According to the Gesta Hungarorum, Menumorut's duchy was populated primarily with Khazars and Székelys, and he acknowledged the suzerainty of the ruling Byzantine Emperor at the time. According to Anonymus, Menumorut communicated "haughtily with a Bulgarian heart".

After spending several days, Duke Árpád, having taken the advice of his noblemen, sent envoys to the castle of Bihar, to Duke Menumorout, asking him, by right of his forbear, King Attila, to give him the land from the Szamos [Zomus] river to the border of Nyr, up to the Meszes Gate [ad portam Mezesynam], and he sent him gifts, just as he had previously sent to Salan, duke of Titel [duci Tytulensy]. And in that embassy were sent two of the most energetic warriors: Vsubuu, father of Zoloucu, and Velec, from whose progeny Turda, the bishop, is descended. For these were the most nobleby birth, like the others that set forth from the Scythian land and who followed Duke Álmos with a great host of peoples.

— Anonymus: Gesta Hungarorum

According to the Gesta Hungarorum, the Hungarians besieged and seized Menumorut's fortress at Biharia which caused him to apologise for his Bulgar sympathies and offered his daughter in marriage to Zoltán, the son of Árpád, the Grand Prince of the Hungarians. The chronicle states that Menumorut died without a son before 907 and left his whole kingdom in peace to Zoltán, his son-in-law.

Ajtony was an early-11th-century ruler in the territory now known as Banat, According to the Gesta Hungarorum, he was a descendant of Glad. He taxed salt which was transferred to King Stephen I of Hungary on the Mureș River. The Hungarian king sent Csanád, Ajtony's former commander-in-chief, against him at the head of a large royal army. Csanád defeated and killed Ajtony, Csanád County and its capital Csanád (today's Cenad in Romania) were named after him.

=== As part of the medieval Kingdom of Hungary ===
==== High Middle Ages ====
The Grand Principality of Hungary existed c. 862 until 1000, then it was re-organized as a Christian Kingdom by King Saint Stephen who was the 5th descendant of Grand Prince Álmos. In 1000 Stephen I of Hungary, grand prince of the Hungarian tribes, was recognised by the Pope and by his brother-in-law Henry II, Holy Roman Emperor as king of Hungary. Although Stephen was raised as a Roman Catholic and Christianization of the Hungarians was achieved mostly by Rome, he also recognized and supported orthodoxy. Attempts by Stephen to control all Hungarian tribal territories led to wars, including one with his maternal uncle Gyula (a chieftain in Transylvania; Gyula was the second-highest title in the Hungarian tribal confederation). In 1002, Stephen led an army into Transylvania and Gyula surrendered without a fight. This made possible the organization of the Transylvanian Catholic episcopacy (with Gyulafehérvár as its seat), which was finished in 1009 when the bishop of Ostia (as papal legate) visited Stephen and they approved diocesan divisions and boundaries.

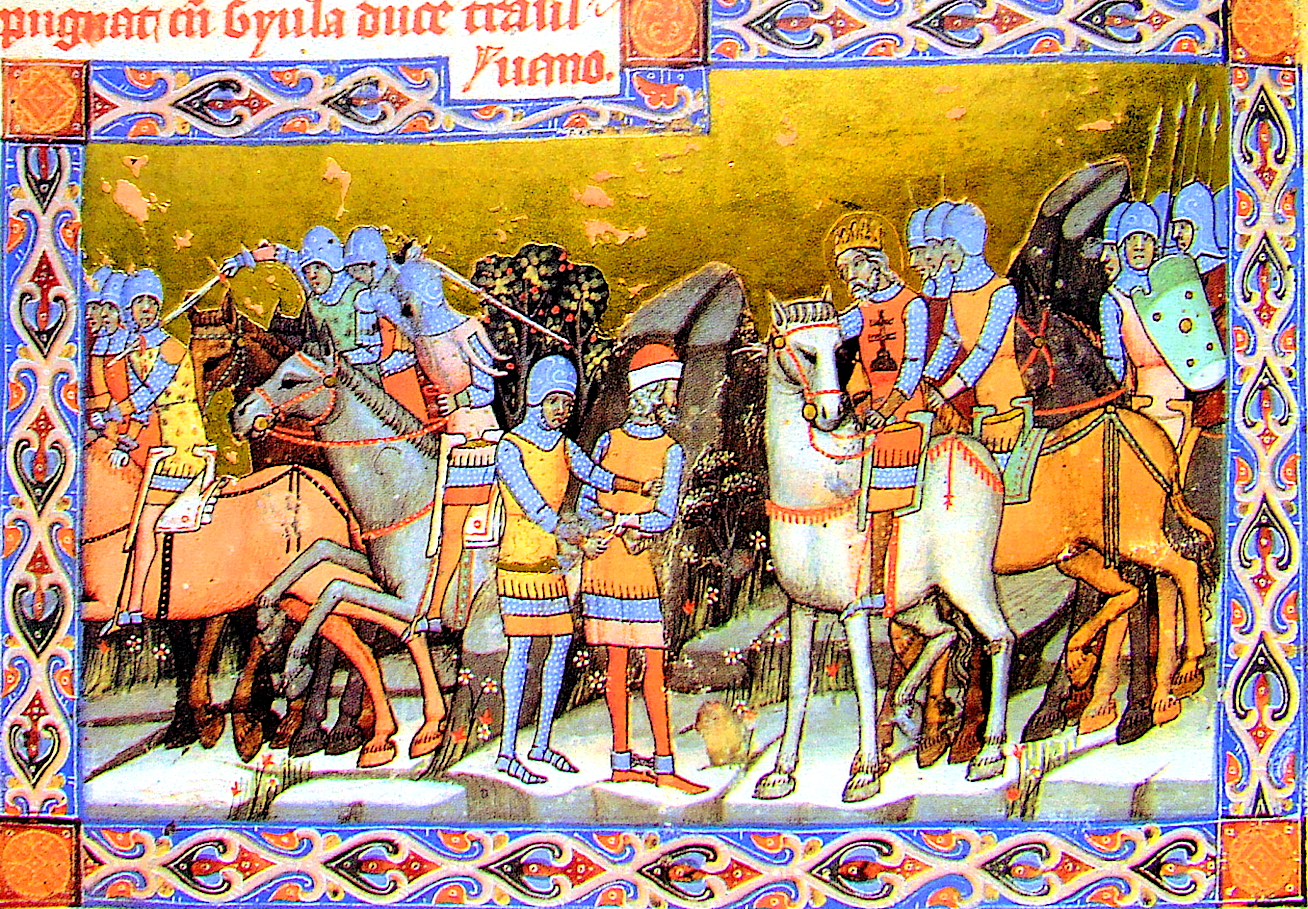
King Saint Stephen of Hungary captures his uncle Gyula, the ruler of Transylvania (Chronicon Pictum, 1358)

After when Saint Stephen had been deemed worthy, and won the crown of the royal majesty by divine order, he waged a famous and profitable war against his maternal uncle named Gyula, who at that time ruled the entire Transylvanian country with his own power. So in the 1002nd year of Our Lord's birth, King Saint Stephen captured Gyula, his wife and two sons and sent them to Hungary...Saint Stephen annexed Gyula's big, rich country all the way to Hungary.

— Mark of Kalt: Chronicon Pictum

According to the Chronicon Pictum, King Stephen I of Hungary defeated Kean, a ruler of Bulgarians and Slavs in southern Transylvania.

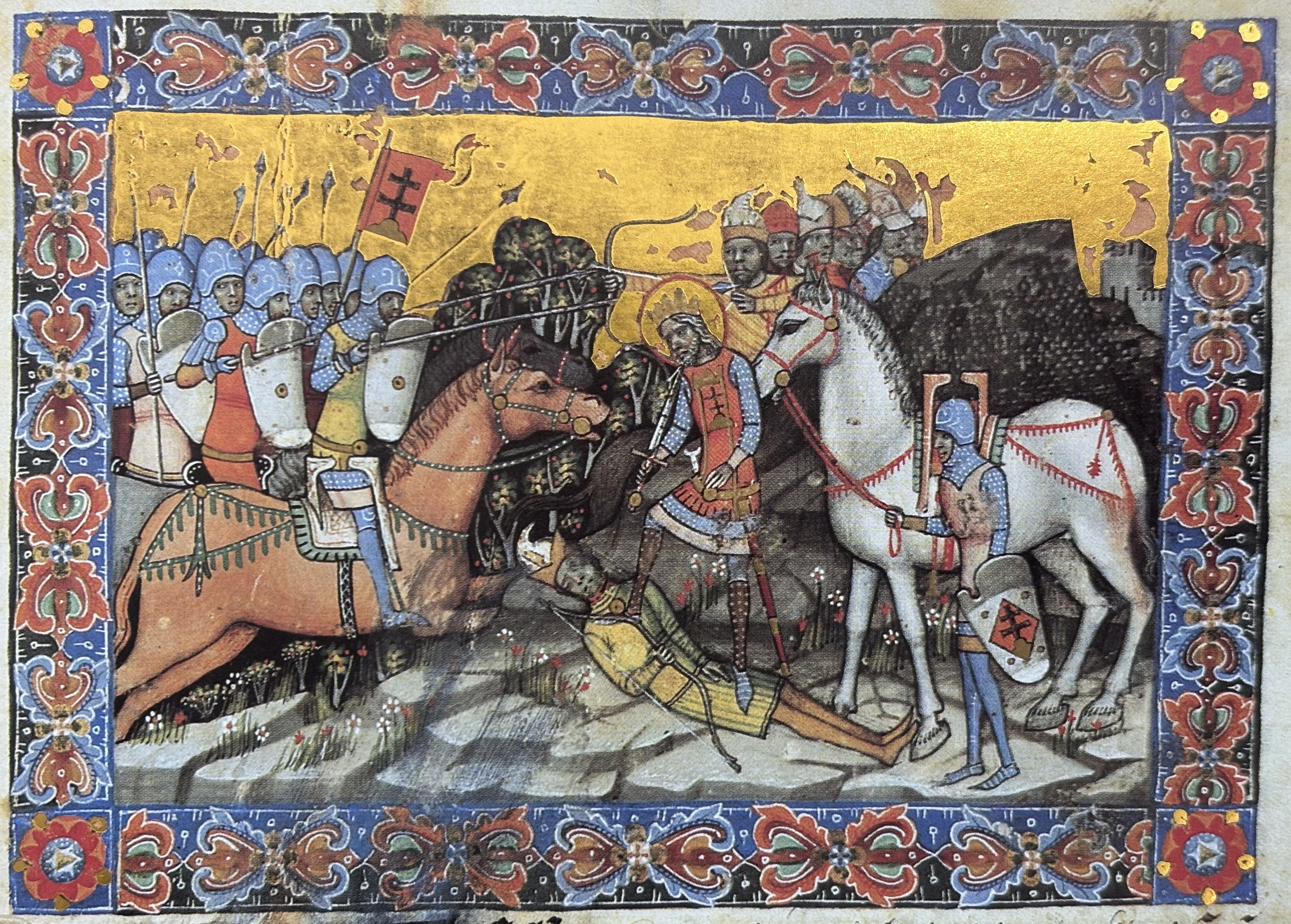
King Saint Stephen of Hungary defeats Kean "Duke of the Bulgarians and Slavs" (Chronicon Pictum, 1358)

Then, He sent his army against Kean, the leader of the Bulgarians and Slavs. These peoples live in places that are very strong according to their natural location, therefore it cost him to much trouble and battle sweat until he finally defeated and killed the named leader. He acquired an inestimable amount of treasure, especially gold, pearls and precious stones. He placed one of his great-grandfathers here, Zoltán by name, who later held those parts of Transylvania as a hereditary province, therefore, he was colloquially called Zoltán of Transylvania. He lived to the time of the holy king and was a very old man, that is why the king made him above the rich nations.

— Mark of Kalt: Chronicon Pictum

Medieval Transylvania was an integral part of the Kingdom of Hungary; however, it was an administratively distinct unit. The medieval Kingdom of Hungary was not divided into provinces, although at the beginning of the 14th century its kings bore a long title that included the names of nine countries and provinces – "By the grace of God, King of Hungary, Dalmatia, Croatia, Rama, Serbia, Galicia, Lodomeria, Cumania and Bulgaria". However, the majority of addresses were demand addresses. Actual rule was only exercised over Croatia and Dalmatia, where the Hungarian authority was represented by the bans placed at the head of the provinces. Within the country – due to their great distance from the center – only two separate territorial governments were established, which are sometimes mentioned as a country (regnum) in the sources, but were never included among the titles of the Hungarian kings: Transylvania along the eastern borders and Slavonia south of the Drava.

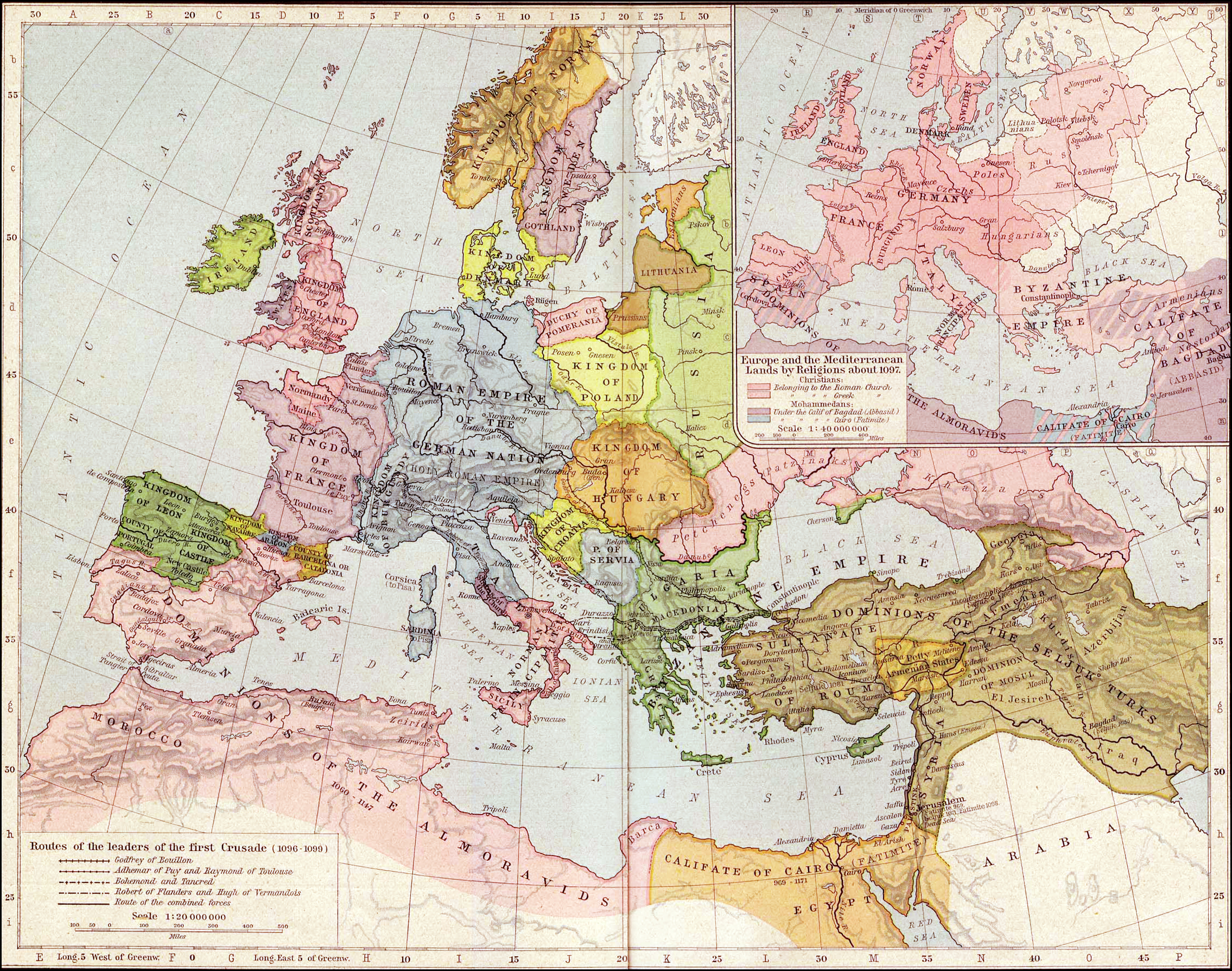
Europe in 1097

The first recorded Pecheneg invasion of Transylvania occurred during the reign of Stephen I of Hungary. The Battle of Kerlés, was an engagement between an army of Pechenegs and Ouzes commanded by Osul and the troops of King Solomon of Hungary and his cousins, Dukes Géza and Ladislaus, in Transylvania in 1068.

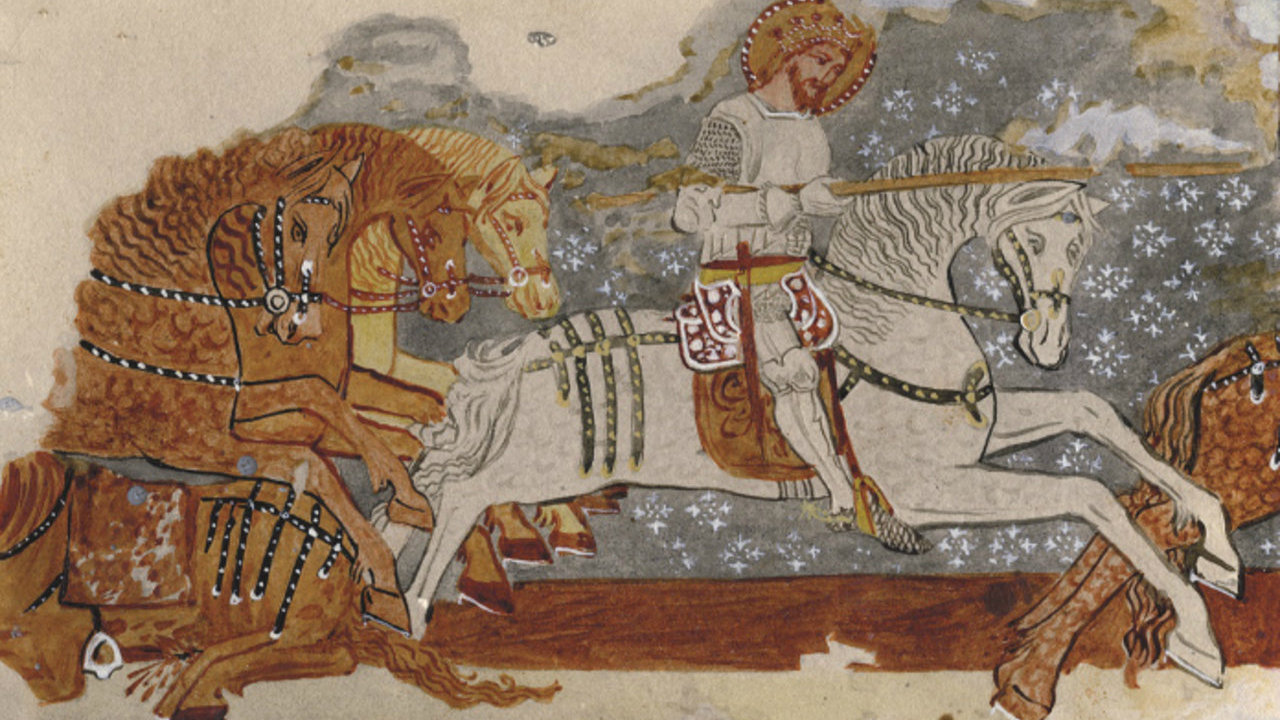
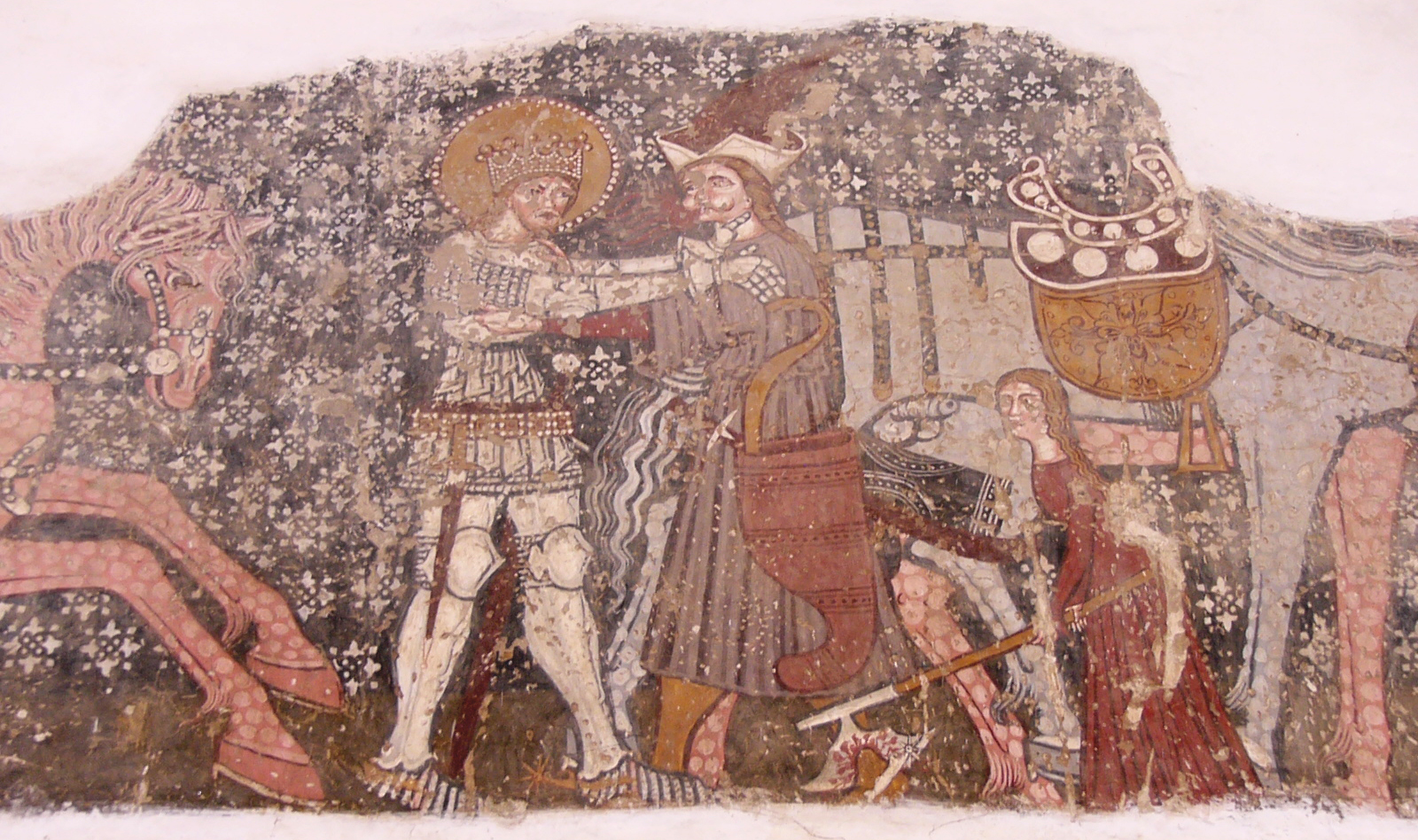
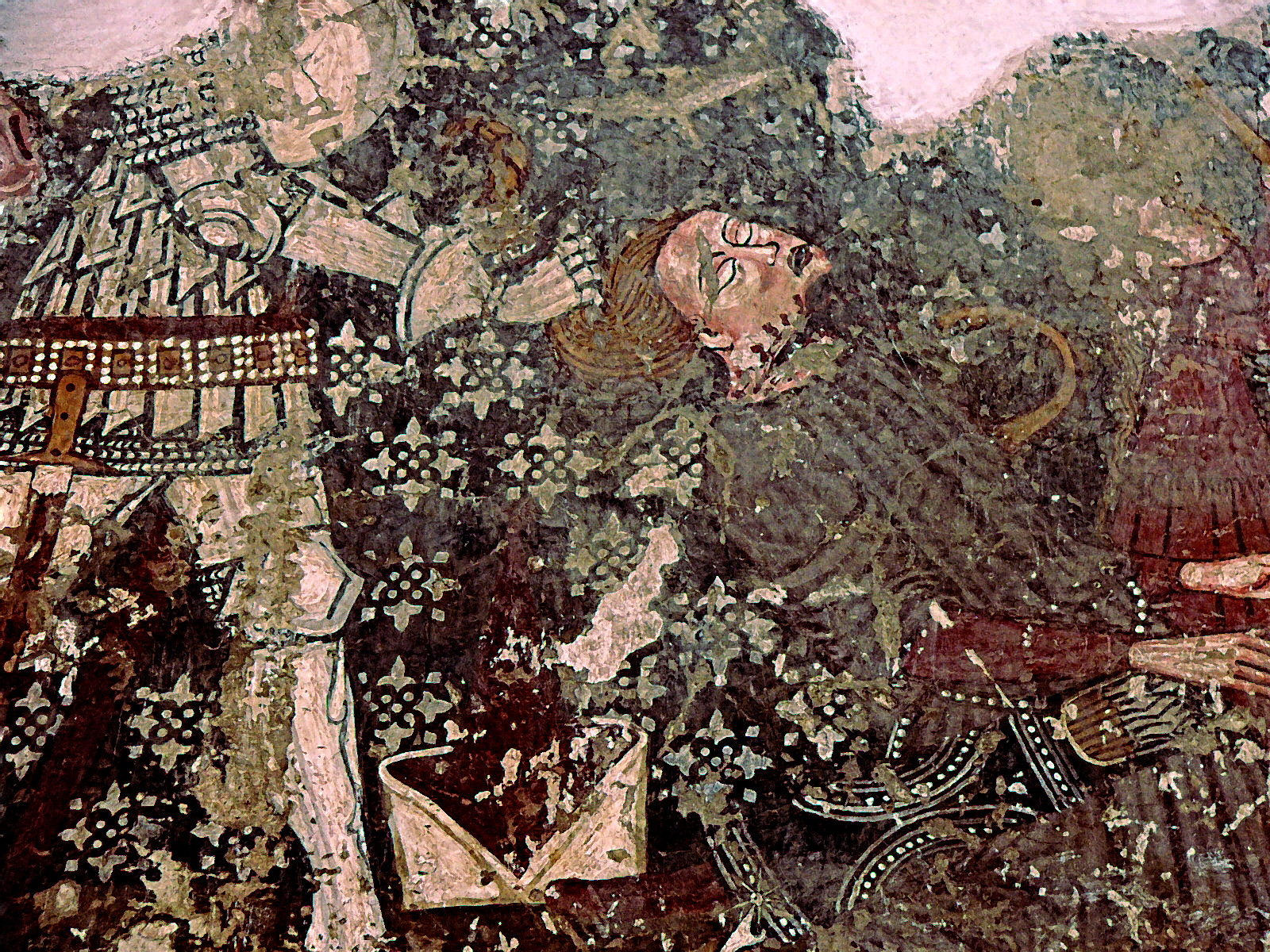
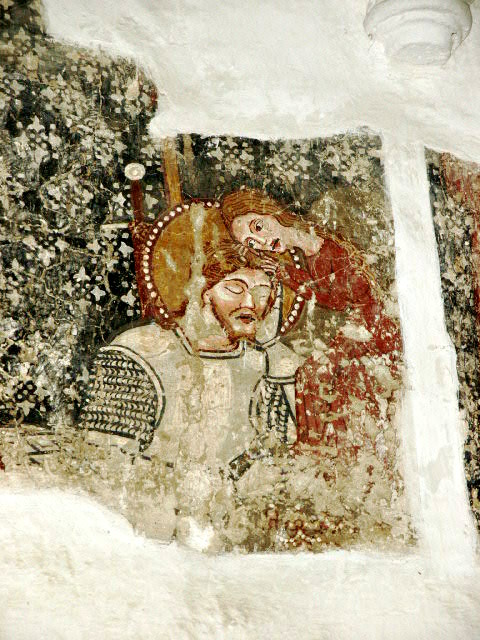
King Saint Ladislaus, the knight-king (fresco of the Saint Ladislaus legend in the church of Székelyderzs, 1419)

King Ladislaus I of Hungary released the imprisoned former king, Solomon at the time of the ceremony of the canonization of the first five Hungarian saints. After his release, Solomon made a final effort to regain his crown. He persuaded a Cuman chieftain, Kutesk, to invade Hungary. Solomon promised Kutesk, that he would give him the right of possession over Transylvania and would take his daughter as wife. King Ladislaus defeated the invaders in 1085.

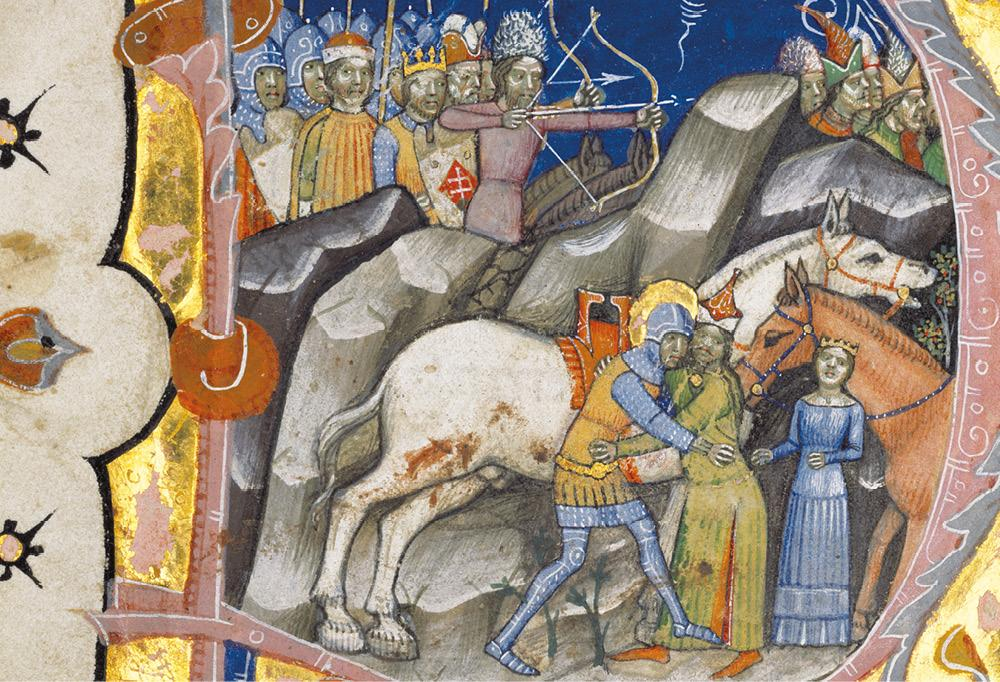
After the Battle of Kerlés in 1068, Saint Ladislaus is fighting a duel with a cuman warrior who kidnapped a girl (Chronicon Pictum, 1358)

Of the known Hungarian documents drafted before 1200, only twenty-seven bear some reference to Transylvania; two date from the 11th, the rest from the 12th century. Of the latter, sixteen reveal only the name of some Transylvanian, religious or lay dignitary, such as a bishop, a dean, a voivode, or a count. In the 13th century, and particularly after 1250, the number of documents touching on Transylvania grows rapidly and reaches over four hundred.

===== Székelys =====
The Székelys have historically claimed descent from Attila's Huns. Hungarian medieval chronicles recount that a contingent of Huns remained in Transylvania, later allying with the returning Hungarians they conquered the Carpathian Basin together in the 9th century. Several medieval Hungarian chronicles claimed that the Székely people descended from Huns:

They, having set forth from the island, riding through the sand and flow of the Tisza, crossed at the harbour of Beuldu, and, riding on, they encamped beside the Kórógy river, and all the Székelys, who were previously the peoples of King Attila, having heard of Usubuu's fame, came to make peace and of their own will gave their sons as hostages along with divers gifts and they undertook to fight in the vanguard of Usubuu's army, and they forthwith sent the sons of the Székelys to Duke Árpád, and, together with the Székelys before them, began to ride against Menumorout.

— Anonymus: Gesta Hungarorum

These Székelys were the remains of the Huns, who when they learned that the Hungarians had returned to Pannonia for the second time, went to the returnees on the border of Ruthenia and, after conquering Pannonia together, gained a part of it, though not in the plain of Pannonia, but among the Vlachs in the mountains along the border. Therefore, being mingled with the Vlachs, they are said to use their letters.

— Simon of Kéza: Gesta Hunnorum et Hungarorum

They were afraid of the western nations that they would suddenly attack them, so they went to Transylvania and did not call themselves Hungarians, but Székelys. The western clan hated the Huns in Attila's life. The Székelys are thus the remnants of the Huns, who remained in the mentioned field until the return of the other Hungarians. So when they knew that the Hungarians would return to Pannonia again, they hurried to Ruthenia to them, conquering the land of Pannonia together.

— Mark of Kalt: Chronicon Pictum

It is said that in addition to the Huns who escorted Csaba, from the same nation, yet three thousand people were retreating, cut themselves out of the said battle, remained in Pannonia, and first established themself in a camp called Csigla's Field. They were afraid of the Western nations which they harassed in Attila's life, and they marched to Transylvania, the frontier of the Pannonian landscape, and they did not call themselves Huns or Hungarians, but Siculus, in their own word Székelys, so that they would not know that they are the remnants of the Huns or Hungarians. In our time, no one doubts, that the Székelys are the remnants of the Huns who first came to Pannonia, and because their people do not seem to have been mixed with foreign blood since then, they are also more strict in their morals, they also differ from other Hungarians in the division of lands. They have not yet forgotten the Scythian letters, and these are not inked on paper, but engraved on sticks skillfully, in the way of the carving. They later grew into not insignificant people, and when the Hungarians came to Pannonia again from Scythia, they went to Ruthenia in front of them with great joy, as soon as the news of their coming came to them. When the Hungarians took possession of Pannonia again, at the division of the country, with the consent of the Hungarians, these Székelys were given the part of the country that they had already chosen as their place of residence.

— Johannes Thuróczy: Chronica Hungarorum

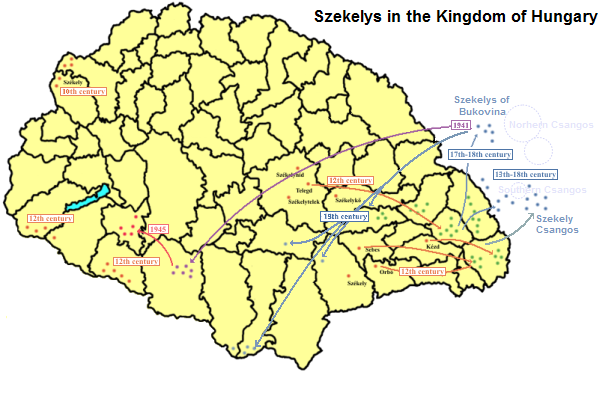
Székely people in the Kingdom of Hungary

In the Middle Ages, the Székelys played a role in the defense of the Kingdom of Hungary against the Ottomans in their posture as guards of the eastern border. Nicolaus Olahus stated in the book Hungaria et Athila in 1536 that "Hungarians and Székelys share the same language, with the difference that the Székelys have their own words specific to their nation." The people of Székelys were in general regarded as the most Hungarian of Hungarians. In 1558, a Hungarian poet, Mihály Vilmányi Libécz voiced this opinion, instructing the reader in his poem that if they had doubts about the correctness of the Hungarian language: "Consult without fail the language of the ancient Székelys, for they are the guardians of the purest Hungarian tongue".

===== Saxons =====
In the 12th and 13th centuries, the areas in the south and northeast were settled by German colonists known as Saxons. Tradition holds that Siebenbürgen, the German name for Transylvania, derives from the seven principal fortified towns founded by these Transylvanian Saxons.

The first German settlers called in by Géza II in around 1160 came from the Rhineland and established their villages between the Olt and Küküllő rivers. Around the same time north of them, German "guests" (hospites) arrived at the kingly estates in Radna and Beszterce. The colonization was organized by the Gräves (de) or gerébs (hu). Some gerébs received judicial, administrative, martial positions. These titles later became hereditary.

Already in the 13th century, Transylvanian Saxony was divided into seats mirroring the Székelys. The basis of the Transylvanian German administration was laid by Andrew II in his 1224 diploma "Andreanum". He ceased the supervision of the voivode and gave the job (called "royal judge" (királybíró) from then on) to the ispán of Szeben. The municipal privileges enabling local priest and judge elections, that the Saxon seats and villages received came to be known as "Szeben freedom" (szebeni szabadság). The area of the Beszterce river could also enjoy the "Szeben freedom" from 1366 on. The Saxons only had to pay tax to the king. This was every year on St. Martin's Day, 11 November. Furthermore, 500 German armored soldiers were recruited into the Hungarian army. The recruitment and training was managed by the Saxon count, the second most powerful Saxon lord in the colony.

As the society evolved, the Saxon middle class discriminated the gerébs who largely assimilated into the Hungarian nobility. The now leaderless communities became either craftmen or independent peasants. The markets where they sold their products became towns. A new class also emerged: the merchant citizenry. Their towns gained the right to tax cargoes, containing expensive eastern goods. As the Saxons now preferred hiring mercenaries rather than recruiting from their own folk, the count post, now functioning more of an economist, was taken over by the mayor of Szeben. The mayor was chosen by an urban council of 12 persons who came from a council of 100 persons. Ergo, the Saxon society's most powerful officials were the royal judge and the mayor, both from Szeben.

The ecclesia of Transylvanian Saxony was very divided. Some counties in the southern part were attached to the provostship of Szeben, others to the bishopric of Gyulafehérvár.

God wanted them to move to Pannonia as soon as possible. Then they crossed mountains for three months, and finally, against the will of the said peoples, they reached the border area of Pannonia, the land now called Transylvania. When they marched into this land, fearing the attack of the surrounding peoples, the whole corps of the militants under their command was divided into seven armies, and captains, lieutenants, corporals were appointed in the usual manner to lead each army, and each army consisted of thirty thousand and eight hundred and fifty-seven armed warriors. Because at the time of their second exodus from Scythia, from the one hundred and eight tribes, two hundred and sixteen thousand armed men were reportedly brought with them, that is, two thousand of every tribe, except those of the household. Over these seven armies, a captain was assigned to lead each of them, and seven hillforts were built to protect their wives and animals and they remained in those castles for a time. This is why the Germans call this part of the land Siebenbürgen, meaning seven castles to this day.

— Johannes Thuróczy: Chronica Hungarorum

===== Teutonic Knights =====
The German influence became more marked when, in 1211, King Andrew II of Hungary called on the Teutonic Knights to protect Transylvania in the Burzenland from the Cumans. After the order strengthened its grip on the territory and expanded it beyond Transylvania without authorisation, Andrew expelled the Knights in 1225.

===== "Voivod" (end 12th–13th century) =====
Administration in Transylvania was at the hands of a voivod appointed by the king (the word voivod, or voievod, first appeared in 1193). Before then, the word ispán was used for the chief official of Alba County. Transylvania came under voivod rule after 1263, when the duties of the Counts of Szolnok (Doboka) and Alba were eliminated. The voivod controlled seven comitatus. According to the Chronicon Pictum, Transylvania's first voivod was Zoltán of Transylvania, the same person as Zolta, great-grandfather of Saint Stephen. This is debated by modern historians, as in the Middle Ages a person couldn't live for so long and be capable to perform such an important position; however, it is not questioned that Zoltán was the relative of the king, maybe his brother.

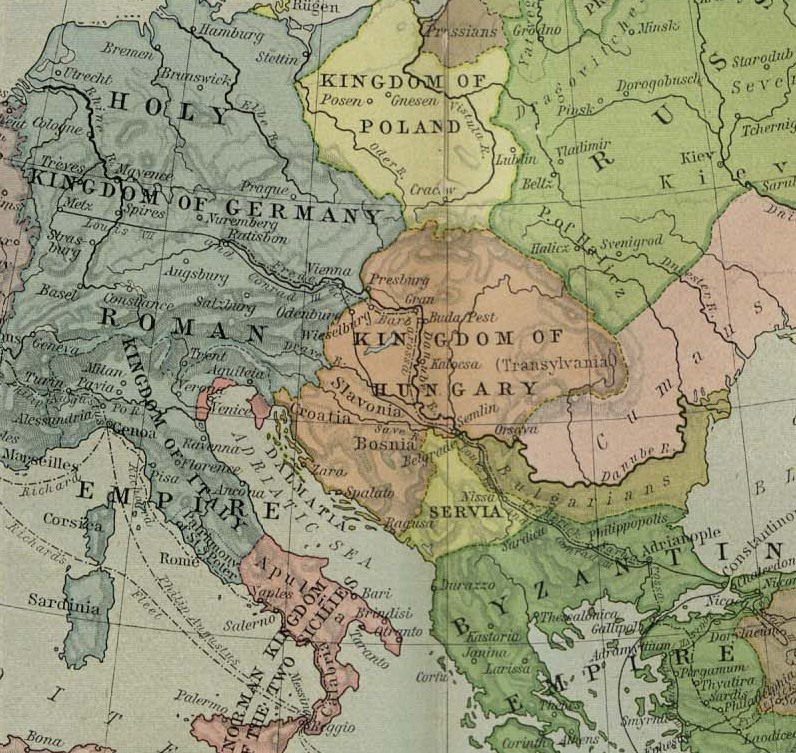
Kingdom of Hungary in 1190, during the rule of Béla III

==== Romanians' presence in Hungarian documents ====
According to Jean W. Sedlar, the oldest extant documents from Transylvania, dating from the 12th and 13th centuries, make passing references to both Hungarians and Vlachs.

In 1213, an army of Vlachs, Saxons and Pechenegs, led by the Count of Sibiu, Joachim Türje, attacked the Second Bulgarian Empire - Bulgarians and Cumans in the fortress of Vidin.

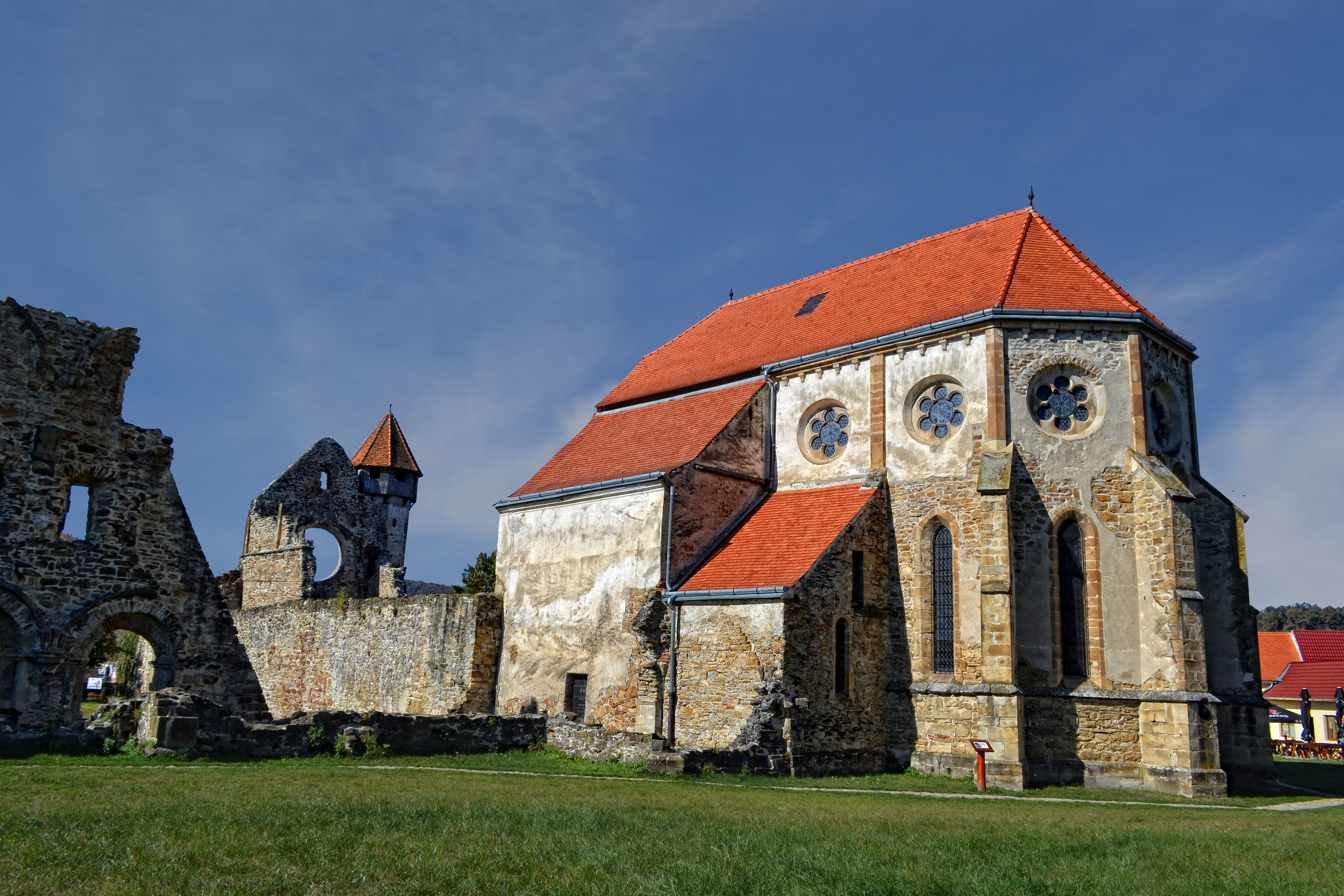
Cârța Monastery

A royal charter from 1223 is the first data on Romanians in Transylvania, related to the monastery of Kerc (now Cârța Monastery in Romania), which mentions that the Vlachs owned the land when the monastery was founded. According to the Diploma Andreanum issued by King Andrew II of Hungary in 1224, the Transylvanian Saxons were entitled to use certain forests together with the Vlachs and Pechenegs.

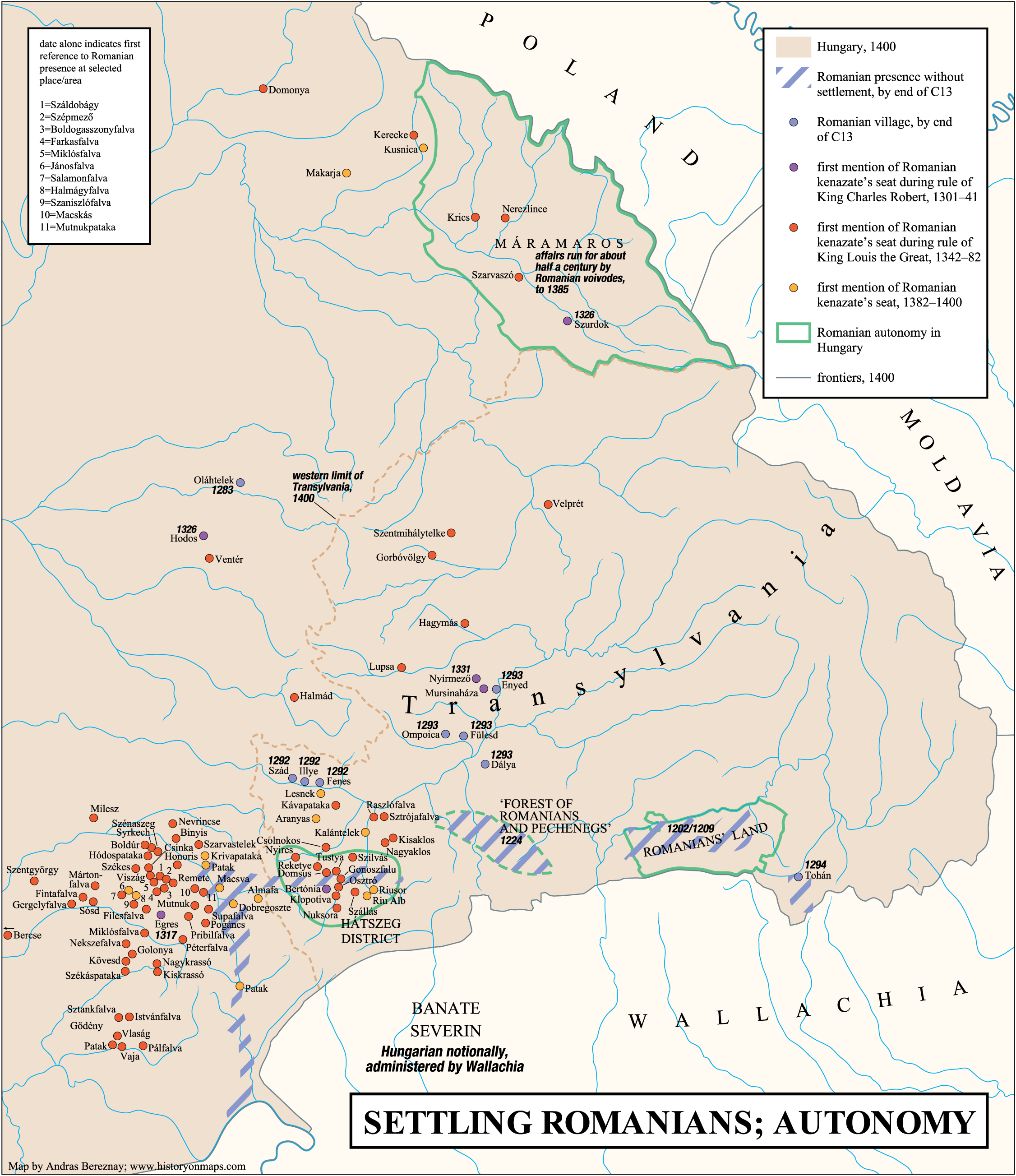
Earliest mentions of Romanian settlements in official documents in the Kingdom of Hungary (between 1200 and 1400).

In 1252 King Béla IV of Hungary, for his services in various foreign embassies, donates to Vince, Comes of the Székely of Sebus, the land called Zek between the territory of the Vlachs of Kyrch, the Saxons of Barasu, and the Székelys of Sebus, which once belonged to a Saxon estate called Fulkun, but has been uninhabited since the Mongol invasion.

In 1256 King Béla IV of Hungary, upon the complaint of Archbishop Benedict of Esztergom, confirms the right of the archdiocese to tithes from mining wages and from animal taxes collected from the Szeklers and Romanians to the king or anyone else, among the judicial, accommodation and taxation privileges of the archdiocese, with the exception of land rents from Saxons, but also from Romanians from everywhere and from anywhere they came.

In the spring of 1291, in Alba Iulia, King Andrew III of Hungary, the last from the Árpád dynasty, convened and presided over an assembly consisting of the representatives of "all nobles, Saxons, Szeklers and Vlachs" (cum universis Nobilibus, Saxonibus, Syculis et Olachis). This was the general congregation of all the privileged groups in Transylvania (the Hungarian nobles, the Saxons, the Szeklers and the Romanians), held about six months after the General Assembly of the Kingdom of Hungary, unfold at Buda.

===== Mongol invasions =====
Diocesan division of Transylvania in the 13th century

In 1241, Transylvania suffered during the Mongol invasion of Europe. Güyük Khan invaded Transylvania from the Oituz (Ojtoz) Pass, while Subutai attacked in the south from the Mehedia Pass towards Orșova. While Subutai advanced northward to meet Batu Khan, Güyük attacked Hermannstadt/Nagyszeben (Sibiu) to prevent the Transylvanian nobility from aiding King Béla IV of Hungary. Beszterce, Kolozsvár and the Transylvanian Plain region were ravaged by the Mongols, in addition to the Hungarian king's silver mine at Óradna. A separate Mongol force destroyed the western Cumans near the Siret River in the Carpathians and annihilated the Cuman bishopric of Milcov. Estimates of population decline in Transylvania due to the Mongol invasion range from 15 to 50 percent.

The Cumans converted to Roman Catholicism and, after their defeat by the Mongols, sought refuge in central Hungary; Elizabeth the Cuman (1244–1290), known as Erzsébet in Hungarian, a Cuman princess, married Stephen V of Hungary in 1254.

In 1285, Nogai Khan with Talabuga led the invasion of Hungary. Talabuga led an army in northern Hungary but was stopped by heavy Carpathian snow; he was defeated near Pest by the royal army of Ladislaus IV and ambushed by the Székelys in retreat. Talabuga's army ravaged Transylvania; cities such as Reghin, Brașov and Bistrița were plundered. Still, the invaders suffered from lack of food, being also confronted with the resistance of the local people, Székelys, Romanians and Saxons.

Benedict, abbot of the church Szent Tamás of Esztergom, wrote regarding the Mongol invasion of 1285: "26,000 Tatars were killed in the Kingdom of Hungary, so the Tatars fled, trying to save themselves from the hands of the Hungarians, they reached Transylvania, but the Székelys, Vlachs and Saxons blocked the roads with their scouts and surrounded them...". Iohannes Longus de Ypre, Marino Sanuto Torsello recorded that in the Mongol invasion the passes of the Carpathians were defended together by the Romanians and the Székelys: "However, the remnants of the Tatars returned to Cumania, after their retreat, the nations of Pannonia, the Vlachs and the Székelys, who live in the Zipheos [Carpathian] mountains, which the Hungarians call forests [Transylvania], closed those passes in such a way that the Tatars could no longer cross them."

In 1288, the archbishop of Strigonius, Lodomerius, the most important Catholic church figure from Hungary, wrote an epistle "to the Hungarian, Saxon, Szeklely and Romanian nobles from the counties of Sibiu and Borsa in Transylvania", bringing serious charges against King Ladislaus IV and demanding them to no longer obey the sovereign and offer military aid against him.

===== Power system: the "estates" (12th–14th century) =====
The three most important 14th-century dignitaries were the voivod, the Bishop of Transylvania and the Abbot of Kolozsmonostor (on the outskirts of present-day Cluj-Napoca).

Transylvania was organized according to the estate system. Its estates were privileged groups, or universitates (the central power acknowledged some collective freedoms), with socio-economic and political power; they were also organized using ethnic criteria.

As in the rest of the Hungarian kingdom, the first estate was the aristocracy (lay and ecclesiastic): ethnically heterogeneous, but undergoing homogenization around its Hungarian nucleus. The document granting privileges to the aristocracy was the Golden Bull of 1222, issued by King Andrew II. The other estates were the Saxons, Szeklers and Romanians, all with an ethno-linguistic basis. The Saxons, who had settled in southern Transylvania in the 12th and 13th centuries, were granted privileges in 1224 by the Diploma Andreanum. The Szeklers and Romanians were granted partial privileges. While the Szeklers consolidated their privileges, extending them to the entire ethnic group, the Romanians had difficulty retaining their privileges in certain areas (terrae Vlachorum or districtus Valachicales) and lost their estate rank. Nevertheless, when the king (or the voivod) summoned the general assembly of Transylvania (congregatio) during the 13th and 14th centuries it was attended by the four estates: noblemen, Saxons, Szeklers and Romanians (Universis nobilibus, Saxonibus, Syculis et Olachis in partibus Transiluanis).

===== Vlach law =====
The Vlach law was a set of laws regulating the way of life and farming of the Central European and Balkan peoples practicing transhumance pastoralism that has been also introduced in the Kingdom of Hungary, thus affecting Transylvania. The expression "ius valachicum" appears in documents issued in the Kingdom of Hungary in the 14th century, referring to a type of law followed by the Romanian population in the kingdom. It was a type of "common law" used by the Romanian population in Kingdom of Hungary, that is also cognate with the law used in both Moldavia and Wallachia. In the Kingdom of Hungary, the unwritten law (customary law) coexisted with the written law (royal decrees), they had the same authority and were applied accordingly in the courts.

In Romanian historiography, the law in the Kingdom of Hungary is cognate of the customary laws in Moldavia and Wallachia and a continuation of the pre-Hungarian Slavo-Romanian legal practices of agricultural land distribution and social stratification (the title of kneze is of Slavic origin but correspondent to Romanian jude). The Romanian historian Ioan-Aurel Pop says that the customary law originates from Roman habit of land distribution were "sortes" (Romanian: sorți) were drawn, the land was divided in falces (Romanian: fălci), the neighbouring falces owner was a vicinus (Romanian: vecin). The uphold of the law was overseen by judes (Romanian juzi) a title that was replaced by the Slavic word knez and developed in situ throughout the centuries. The law was connected to the so-called Romanian districts "districta Valachorum". The first Romanian districts are mentioned in the 14th century, after they become more visible in the records. These districts encountered throughout the Kingdom of Hungary are not specific to a Romanian population, the term depending upon context differed in its meaning. That Romanian districts had some sort of legal autonomy, where people might use Romanian customary law. The Vlach law had roots in the Romano-Byzantine legal tradition which was influenced by the Hungarian customary law. More than 60 Romanian districts are known to have existed in the Kingdom of Hungary.

In Hungarian historiography, due to the settlement activities of the kenezes, villages with Vlach law arose in the Kingdom of Hungary between the 13th and 16th centuries, initially mostly inhabited by Romanians (Vlachs) and Ruthenians. The very first villages with Vlach law were established in Transylvania, their numbers increased, and spread in Upper Hungary, and in other parts of the Kingdom of Hungary, primarily in mountainous areas. Mostly shepherds lived in their villages with the Vlach law. According to this law, people were settled where the natural conditions were not favorable for farming. Its essential elements were the unique taxation methods. As the law had a more freedom of degree of taxation, it was favoring the immigration of foreigners. The origin of Vlach law, that the kenez was not only chieftain, but also a settlement contractor, who receives some uninhabited land from the king in order to settle it and then he and his descendants judge over the settlers in non-principal matters. These areas are smaller or larger in proportion to the size of the donated land. There were kenezes with 300 families, but also ones with barely four or five families. Initially, they settled in the vicinity of existing villages, but from the middle of the 14th century, they also founded independent settlements.

The Romanian immigrants in the Kingdom of Hungary are invariably characterized in Hungarian sources as mountain shepherds. As late as the 16th century, an official report referred to Romanians as people who kept many animals in the forests and mountains. The "sheep tax" (quinquagesima ovium, meaning "sheep fiftieth") was paid only by the Romanians, a people closely identified with sheep-breeding. The tax required the delivery of one sheep for every fifty sheep held. Since the mountain-dwelling Romanians practised but subsistence farming, they were not taxed on their agricultural output.

Contrary to the name of this law, not only the Romanians (Vlachs), but also other peoples were entitled to this right. The village with Vlach law was not only the place of residence of the Romanian or Ruthenian population, Slovaks, Poles, Croats and Hungarians also settled according to the more free Vlach law, favorable to the immigration of foreigners.

Voivode was the title of a leader who held authority over several kenezes. Sources dating from the 14th century confirm that whereas kenez was a hereditary title, the voivodes were initially elected by the Romanians, which was a practice consistent with Hungarian customary law, which provided that immigrant groups elect a leader from their ranks. (Székelys elected their captains and judges, Saxons elected the magistrates who worked alongside the royal court), and ). The voivodes followed the example of the kenezes and obtained that their status and privileges be passed on to their heirs. The hereditary status of voivodes and kenez did not deprive ordinary Romanians of their legal and economic rights, those rights were recognized by the castellans at the head of Hungarian castle districts. In the district courts, in accordance with Hungarian administrative practice, they appointed not only kenezes but also Romanian priests and commoners, and the courts followed Romanian customary law in rendering judgment.

The most important characteristics of the legal status of villages with Vlach law were the following: the judge of the resettled population is the settler kenezes, or was his heir, and the court of Hungarian royal officers judged the kenez. One third of the amount of fines imposed on the people went to the kenez, and two thirds could be used by the villages for their own needs. The villages could redeem their public service obligation with a tenth of their produce. The population gave a royal fiftieth of their animals.

In the early 14th century, it was recorded about 40 Romanian districts, which stretched through eastern Hungary and Transylvania, northwards to Máramaros. The knezes were entrusted with the duty to populate private and royal estates. The Romanian knezes in return for their settlement activities, obtained permanent leadership of the settlements which they had founded and they acquired rights to revenues. The knezes held the title of nobles, however the knezes were not qualified as full nobles, because they were obligated to pay duties to the castle in exchange for their estates. The duties of the Romanian knezes varied according to the district and to the individual conditions under which their ancestors had initially acquired and settled the land: to provide a single mounted warrior for guarding the Danube river against intrusion, and to supply livestock, including delivery of the "sheep fiftieth".

==== Later Middle Ages ====
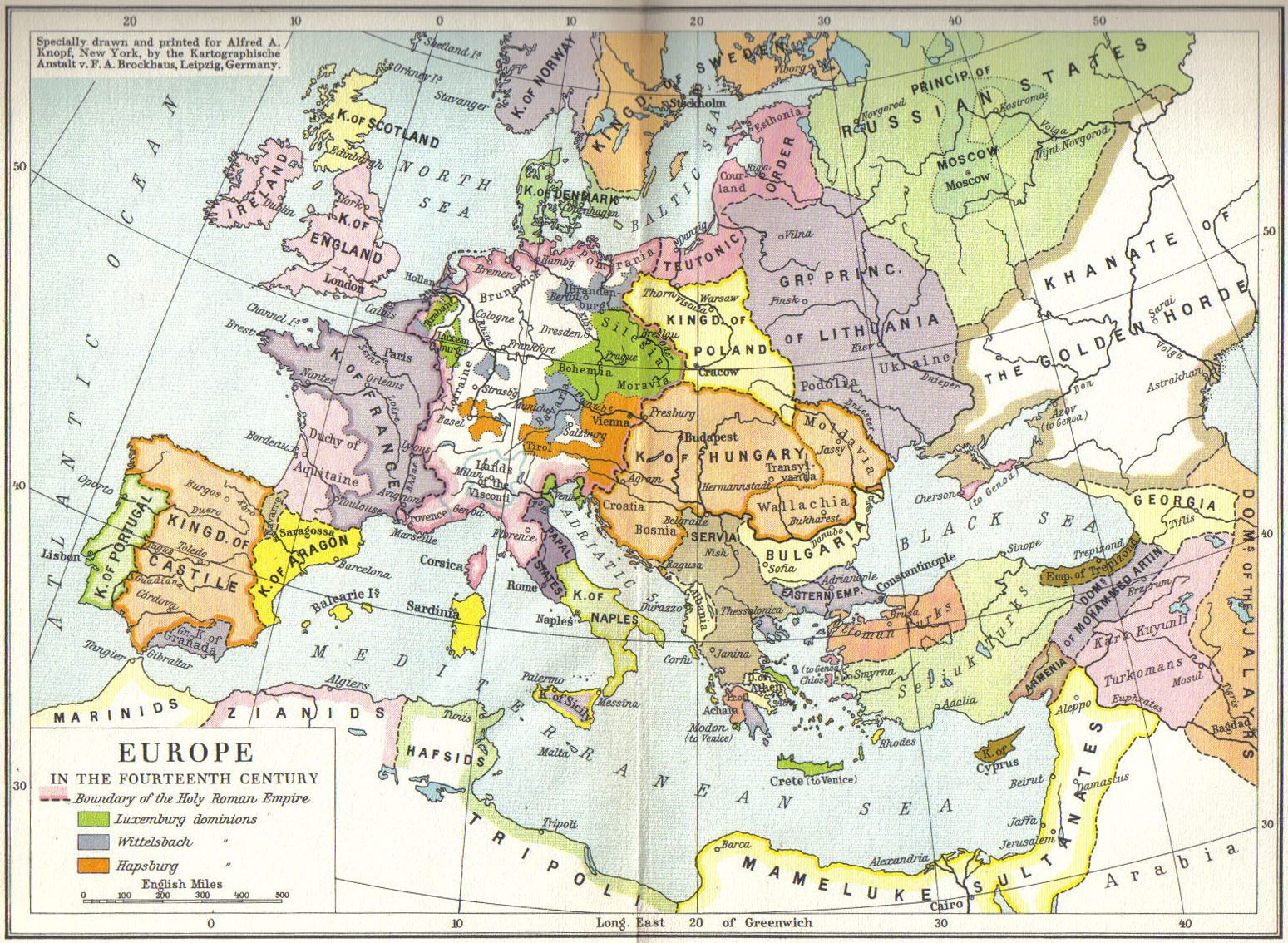
Europe in 14th century

In the 14th century, the Kingdom of Hungary had a political and economic consolidation, thus Transylvania prospered as never before. King Louis I of Hungary dispatched Andrew Lackfi, Count of the Székelys to invade the lands of the Golden Horde in retaliation for the Tatars's earlier plundering raids against Transylvania. Lackfi and his army of mainly Székely warriors inflicted a defeat on a large Tatar army on 2 February 1345. The campaign had finally expelled the Tatars and ended the devastations of the Mongols in Transylvania. The Golden Horde was pushed back behind the Dniester River, thereafter the Golden Horde's control of the lands between the Eastern Carpathians and the Black Sea weakened.

In Hungarian historiography, the main source of problems was the relationship between nobles and villains, which was not resolved and was further complicated as claimed by legal and social aspects of the settlement of Romanians in the Hungarian counties. King Louis I of Hungary visited Transylvania in 1366 to deal with the disorder.

Among the Hungarian kings, King Louis I of Hungary was the most frequent visitor in Transylvania, one reason to settle the problems of the southern borderlands. It was not a serious threat, however the armies of the Wallachian voivodes who are frequently rebelled against the Hungarian Crown rampaged the Saxon villages at the frontiers. To secure the defence of the southern mountain passes, King Louis I of Hungary had rebuilt the castles of Talmács (now Tălmaciu in Romania) and Törcs (now Bran Castle in Romania) by the Saxons of Szeben and Brassó (now Sibiu and Brașov in Romania).

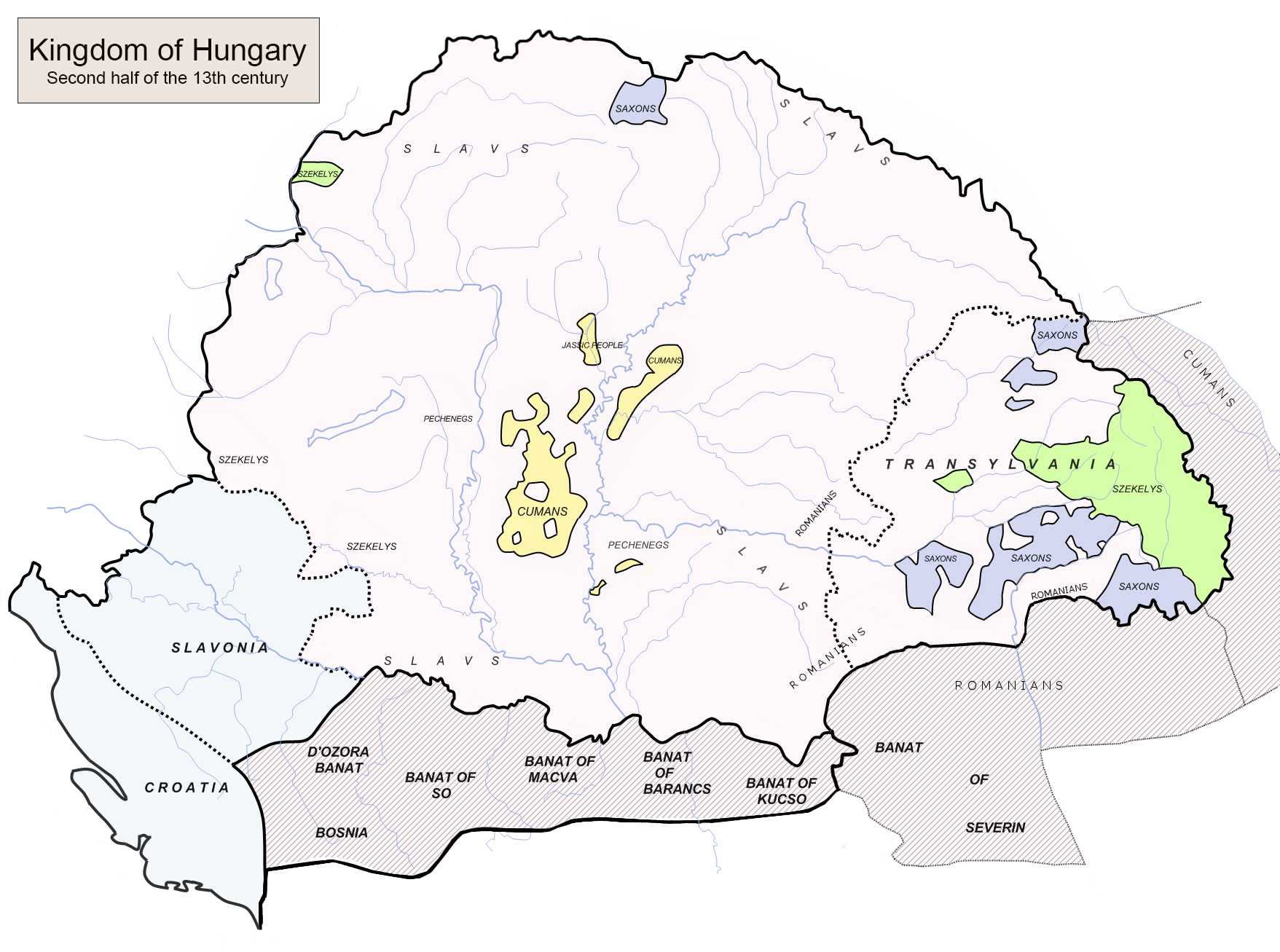
Local autonomies in the Kingdom of Hungary (late 13th century)

The relative calmness of public conditions in Transylvania is reflected in the list of the voivodes in the 14th century. Individuals and families who enjoyed the Hungarian king's trust hold the extremely prestigious office for long periods, which ensured a political continuity: Thomas Szécsényi for 22 years, the Lackfi family for 26 years, and Ladislaus Losonci for 15 years. The Voivode of Transylvania was the governor, chief magistrate, and the military commander of the Transylvania's counties, his authority included the Székely and Saxon territories as well. The Székely and Saxon areas were governed by the Count of the Székelys and Count of the Saxons who were nominally independent from the Transylvanian voivode, and the Székelys and Saxons insisted for this status, because they were afraid that if they came under common judicial and administrative authority with the Hungarian nobility, their specific legal order would be pushed into the background by the influence of Hungarian noble law. The unified control of Transylvania was in the interests of the Hungarian kings, harmony among the chief officials of Transylvania was ensured that the Count of the Székelys, who was also the count of three of the four Saxon districts (Beszterce, Brassó, Medgyes-Selyk), was appointed from among the close relatives of the voivode. King Louis I of Hungary entrusted Transylvania to the Lackfi family for the posts of the Voivode of Transylvania and the Count of the Székelys for most of the period between 1344 and 1376. The voivode represented Transylvania to the outside world. Inside Transylvania, the voivode was the connection between the social groups that were different by language, custom, interest, and law. The first institutional relations of the three feudal nations (Hungarian nobles, Székelys, Saxons) were forged through the voivode. Legal, administrative or military questions often arose in which the three nations were interested. The Hungarian king was supposed to call a general council, but he usually entrusted this task to the Transylvanian voivode. The diets at Torda (now Turda in Romania) were a frequent occurrence in the 14th century, which helped to the leaders of the three nations to take note of their common interests. The Ottoman threat made the cooperation especially urgent.

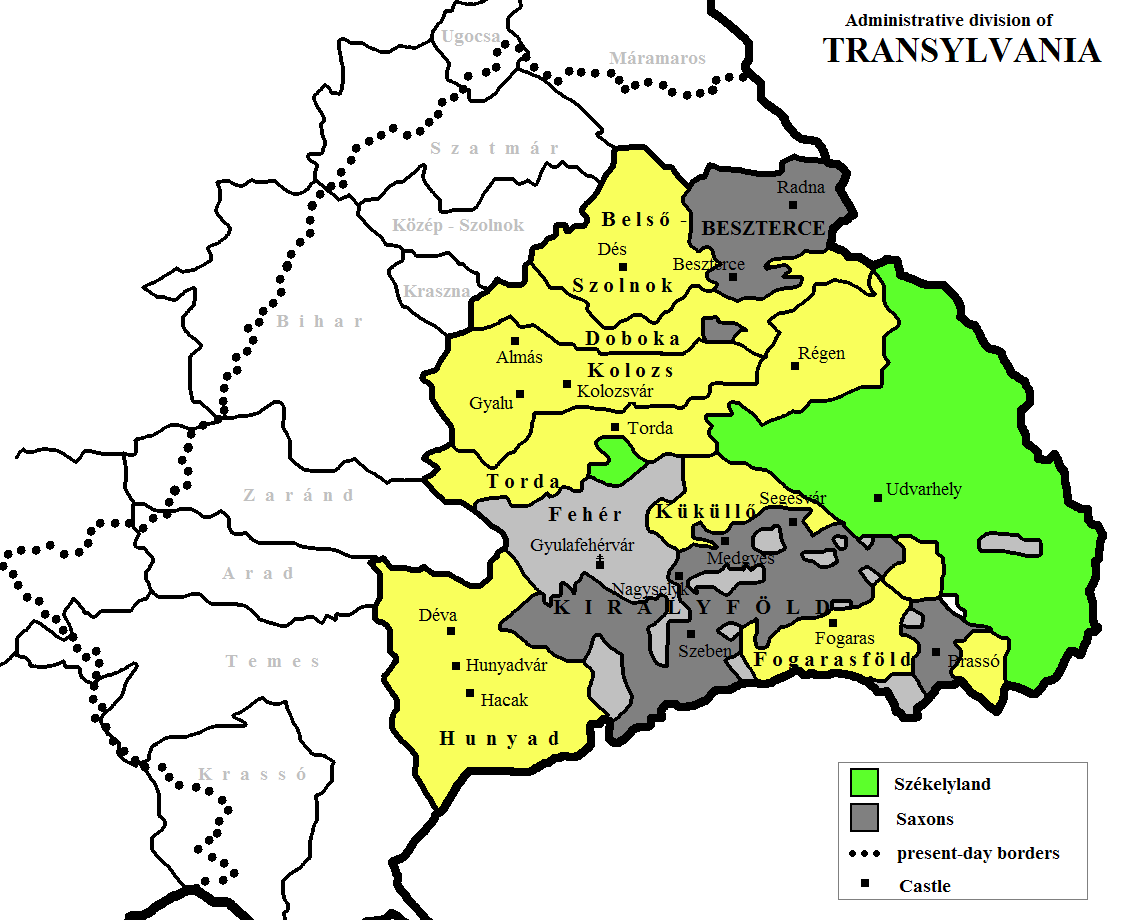
Administrative divisions of Transylvania, early 16th century

According to Romanian historian Pop, following the Decree of Turda, which came after the loss of Moldavia to Bogdan I of Moldavia one year earlier and the breakaway of Wallachia a few decades earlier, Romanians' offered a "muted resistance" against the monarch and the noblemen who had attempted to deprive them of their property, especially their inherited estates. Romanians no longer had the right to participate in political power being gradually reduced to the state of the peasantry. The rich Romanians, Romanian nobility, Romanian knights and landowners, in order to maintain their rights and continue their hold on power, converted to the Catholicism and adopted the Hungarian customs. From the 16th century, the nobility becomes synonymous with Hungarianness. The Romanian nobles who continued and participated in power broke away from their mass of their people, whom they ceased to represent.

In 1437 Hungarian and Romanian peasants, the petty nobility and burghers from Kolozsvár (Klausenburg, now Cluj), under Antal Nagy de Buda, rose against their feudal masters and proclaimed their own estate (universitas hungarorum et valachorum, "the estate of Hungarians and Romanians"). To suppress the revolt the Hungarian nobility in Transylvania, the Saxon burghers and the Székelys formed the Unio Trium Nationum (Union of the Three Nations): a mutual-aid alliance against the peasants, pledging to defend their privileges against any power except that of Hungary's king. By 1438, the rebellion was crushed. From 1438 onwards the political system was based on the Unio Trium Nationum, and society was regulated by these three estates: the nobility (mostly Hungarians), the Székely and Saxon burghers. These estates, however, were more social and religious than ethnic divisions. Directed against the peasants, the Union limited the number of estates (excluding the Orthodox from political and social life in Transylvania): "The privileges define the status of the three recognized nations – the Hungarians, the Siculi and the Saxons – and the four churches – Lutheran, Calvinist, Unitarian and Catholic. The exclusion concerns the Romanian community and its Orthodox Church, a community that accounts for at least 50% of the population in the mid-eighteenth century."

===== Ottoman threat and John Hunyadi =====
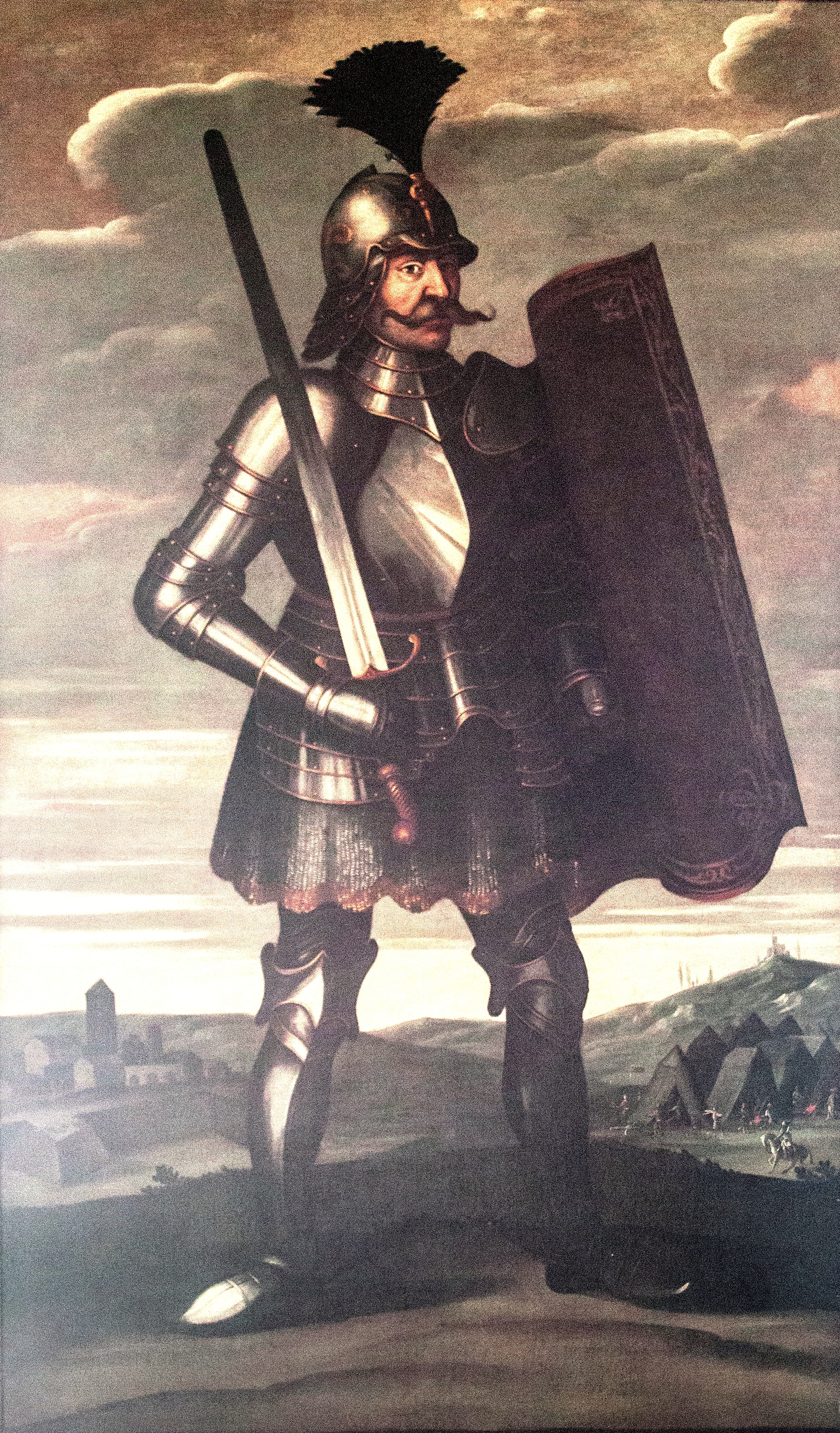
John Hunyadi, Voivode of Transylvania, Regent-Governor of the Kingdom of Hungary

The Ottomans became aware of the Transylvanian peasant revolt in 1437, a fact which made the region an even more attractive target for the large-scale expedition of the following year. Ali Bey, possibly driven by a desire for revenge after his defeat near Smederevo that summer, launched a raid into Transylvania during the winter of 1437–1438, aiming to gather intelligence about the region.

Between 1438 and 1440, the Ottoman Empire pursued a comprehensive strategy aimed at expanding its influence and territorial control in the Balkans and Central Europe. This approach involved the annexation and incorporation of buffer states such as Serbia, followed by efforts to bring Wallachia under direct Ottoman control. Simultaneously, the Ottomans launched repeated raids into Transylvania and other regions of the Kingdom of Hungary. The Ottomans planned to initiate a broader campaign aimed at the conquest of Hungary, with the ultimate goal of annexing at least a portion of the Hungarian Kingdom into the Ottoman realm.

In 1438, Sultan Murad II personally led the largest raid on Hungary in living memory, an Ottoman expedition in Transylvania. The Ottoman invasion ravaged southeastern Hungary for 45 days, during which the Ottomans faced little resistance, except at Szeben (now Sibiu, Romania), where the resistance of citizens caused significant Ottoman casualties.

A key figure in Transylvania at this time was John Hunyadi (c. 1387 or 1400–1456). Hunyadi was awarded a number of estates (becoming one of the foremost landowners in Hungarian history) and a seat on the royal council for his service to Sigismund of Luxemburg. After supporting the candidature of Ladislaus III of Poland for the Hungarian throne, he was rewarded in 1440 with the captaincy of the fortress of Nándorfehérvár (Belgrade) and the voivodship of Transylvania (with his fellow voivod Miklos Újlaki). His subsequent military exploits (he is considered one of the foremost generals of the Middle Ages) against the Ottoman Empire brought him further status as the regent of Hungary in 1446 and papal recognition as the Prince of Transylvania in 1448.

Sultan Murad II proclaimed a raid into Transylvania, John Hunyadi defeated the raiding Ottoman army at the Battle of Hermannstadt in 1442. John Hunyadi and his 15,000 men defeated the 80,000-strong army of Beylerbey Şehabeddin at Zajkány (today's Zeicani), near the Iron Gate of the Danube river in 1442.

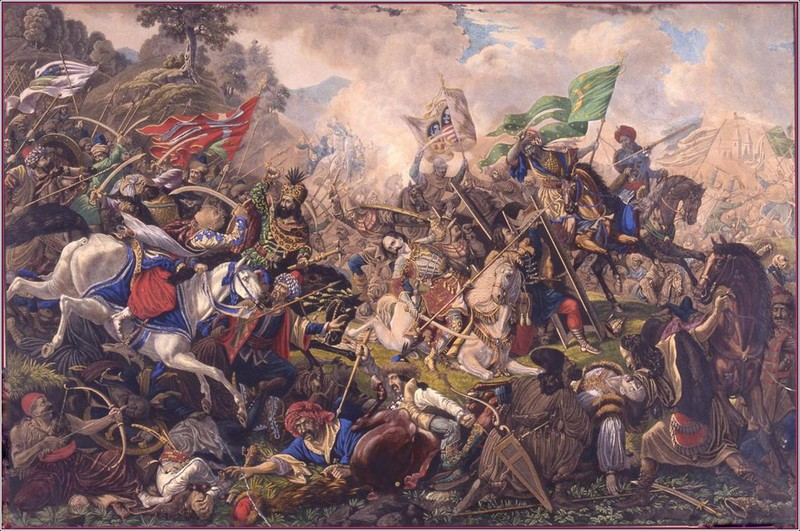
Battle of Breadfield (Colorized lithography from Eduard Gurk after Ion Osolsobie, 19th century)

The Battle of Breadfield was the most tremendous conflict fought in Transylvania up to that time in the Ottoman–Hungarian Wars, taking place in 1479 during the reign of King Matthias Corvinus. The Hungarian army defeated a highly outnumbered Ottoman army and the Ottoman casualties were extremely high. The battle was the most significant victory for the Hungarians against the raiding Ottomans, and as a result, the Ottomans did not attack southern Hungary and Transylvania for many years thereafter.

== Early modern period ==
=== Principality of Transylvania ===
When the main Hungarian army and King Louis II Jagiello were slain by the Ottomans in the 1526 Battle of Mohács, John Zápolya—voivod of Transylvania, who opposed the succession of Ferdinand of Austria (later Emperor Ferdinand I) to the Hungarian throne—took advantage of his military strength. When John I was elected king of Hungary, another party recognized Ferdinand. In the ensuing struggle Zápolya was supported by Sultan Suleiman I, who (after Zápolya's death in 1540) overran central Hungary to protect Zápolya's son John II. John Zápolya founded the Eastern Hungarian Kingdom (1538–1570), from which the Principality of Transylvania arose. The principality was created after the signing the Treaty of Speyer in 1570 by king John II and emperor Maximiliam II, thus John Sigismund Zápolya, the Eastern Hungarian king became the first prince of Transylvania. According to the treaty, the Principality of Transylvania nominally remained part of the Kingdom of Hungary in the sense of public law. The Treaty of Speyer stressed in a highly significant way that John Sigismund's possessions belonged to the Holy Crown of Hungary and he was not permitted to alienate them.

Habsburgs controlled Royal Hungary, which comprised counties along the Austrian border, Upper Hungary and some of northwestern Croatia. The Ottomans annexed central and southern Hungary.

In 1568, the Diet of Torda enacted the Edict of Torda, decreeing religious freedom in Transylvania in the Eastern Hungarian Kingdom, an extraordinary and unprecedented development for its time. Preachers were permitted to "preach the Gospel according to their own understanding", while persecution, imprisonment, and removal from office on religious grounds were prohibited. The first such list, dating from 1595, identified the four recognised religions: Roman Catholicism, Lutheranism, Calvinism and Unitarianism. The laws subsequently referred to the Orthodox religion of the Romanian population as a tolerated religion.

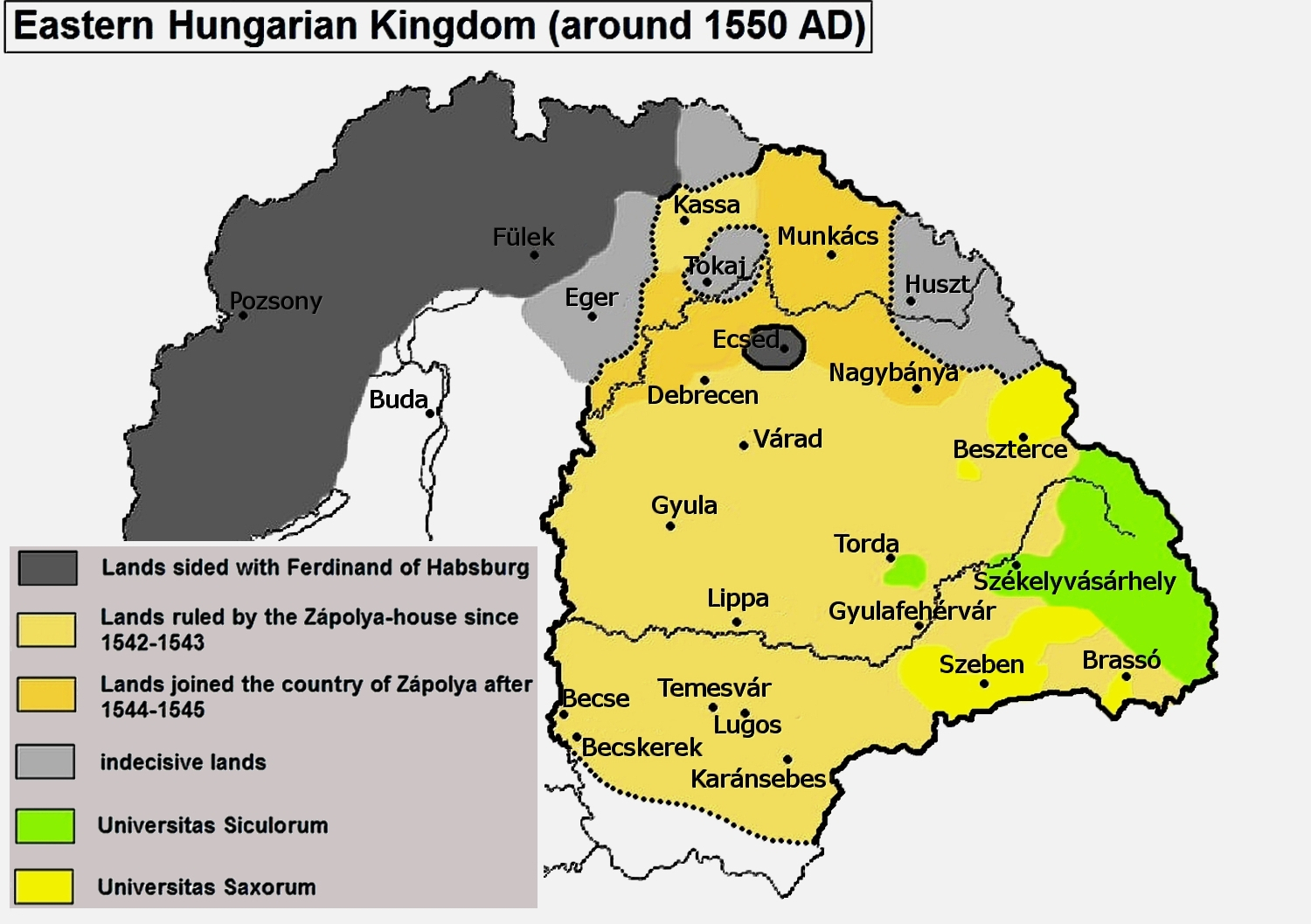
Transylvania as part of the Eastern Hungarian Kingdom. "Universitas Siculorum" are the setas of the Székelys and "Universitas Saxorum" are the seats of the Transylvanian Saxons.

Transylvania became a semi-independent state under the Ottoman Empire (the Principality of Transylvania), where Hungarian princes who paid the Turks tribute enjoyed relative autonomy, and Austrian and Turkish influences vied for supremacy for nearly two centuries. It was now beyond the reach of Catholic religious authority, allowing Lutheran and Calvinist preaching to flourish. In 1563 Giorgio Blandrata was appointed court physician; his radical religious ideas influenced young King John II and Calvinist bishop Francis David, eventually converting both to Unitarianism. Francis David prevailed over Calvinist Peter Melius in 1568 in a public debate, resulting in individual freedom of religious expression under the Edict of Turda (the first such legal guarantee of religious freedom in Christian Europe). Lutherans, Calvinists, Unitarians and Roman Catholics received protection, while the majority Eastern Orthodox Church was tolerated.

Transylvania was governed by princes and its Diet (parliament). The Transylvanian Diet consisted of three estates: the Hungarian elite (largely ethnic Hungarian nobility and clergy), Saxon leaders (German burghers) and the free Székely Hungarians.

The three principalities under Michael the Brave's authority, May – September 1600

The Báthory family, which assumed power at the death of John II in 1571, ruled Transylvania as princes under the Ottomans (and briefly under Habsburg suzerainty) until 1602. The younger Stephen Báthory, a Hungarian Catholic who later became King Stephen Báthory of Poland, tried to maintain the religious liberty granted by the Edict of Turda but interpreted this obligation in an increasingly restricted sense. Under Sigismund Báthory, Transylvania entered the Long War, which began as a Christian alliance against the Turks and became a four-sided conflict in Transylvania involving the Transylvanians, Habsburgs, Ottomans and the Romanian voivod of Wallachia led by Michael the Brave.

Michael gained control of Transylvania (supported by the Szeklers) in October 1599 after the Battle of Șelimbăr, in which he defeated Andrew Báthory's army. Báthory was killed by Szeklers who hoped to regain their old privileges with Michael's help. In May 1600 Michael gained control of Moldavia, thus he became the leader of the three principalities of Wallachia, Moldavia and Transylvania (the three major regions of modern Romania). Michael installed Wallachian boyars in certain offices but did not interfere with the estates and sought support from the Hungarian nobility. In 1600 he was defeated by Giorgio Basta (Captain of Upper Hungary) and lost his Moldavian holdings to the Poles. After presenting his case to Rudolf II in Prague (capital of Germany), Michael was rewarded for his service. He returned, assisting Giorgio Basta in the Battle of Guruslău in 1601. Michael's rule did not last long, however; he was assassinated by Walloon mercenaries under the command of Habsburg general Basta in August 1601. Michael's rule was marred by the pillaging of Wallachian and Serbian mercenaries and Székelys avenging the Szárhegy Bloody Carnival of 1596. When he entered Transylvania he did not grant rights to the Romanian inhabitants. Instead, Michael supported the Hungarian, Szekler, and Saxon nobles by reaffirming their rights and privileges.

After his defeat at Miriszló, the Transylvanian estates swore allegiance to the Habsburg emperor Rudolph. Basta subdued Transylvania in 1604, initiating a reign of terror in which he was authorised to appropriate land belonging to noblemen, Germanize the population and reclaim the principality for Catholicism in the Counter-Reformation. The period between 1601 (the assassination of Michael the Brave) and 1604 (the fall of Basta) was the most difficult for Transylvania since the Mongol invasion. "Misericordia dei quod non-consumti sumus" ("only God's mercy saves us from annihilation") characterised this period, according to an anonymous Saxon writer.

Principality of Transylvania, 1606–1660

During the first half of the 16th century, Transylvania was dominated by heat periods and droughts, while during the second half, heavy rainfall and floods occurred. Both are considered to be consequences of the Little Ice Age. There were crop failures, outbreaks of plague, decades-long famines and plagues of locusts.

From 1604 to 1606, the Calvinist Bihar magnate István Bocskay led a successful rebellion against Habsburg rule. Bocskay was elected Prince of Transylvania April 5, 1603, and Prince of Hungary two months later. The two major achievements of Bocskay's brief reign (he died December 29, 1606) were the Peace of Vienna (June 23, 1606) and the Peace of Zsitvatorok (November 1606). With the Peace of Vienna Bocskay obtained religious liberty, the restoration of all confiscated estates, repeal of all "unrighteous" judgments, full retroactive amnesty for all Hungarians in Royal Hungary and recognition as independent sovereign prince of an enlarged Transylvania. Almost-equally important was the twenty-year Peace of Zsitvatorok, negotiated by Bocskay between Sultan Ahmed I and Rudolf II.

Gabriel Bethlen (who reigned from 1613 to 1629) thwarted all efforts of the emperor to oppress (or circumvent) his subjects, and won a reputation abroad by championing the Protestant cause. He waged war on the emperor three times, was proclaimed King of Hungary twice and obtained a confirmation of the Treaty of Vienna for the Protestants (and seven additional counties in northern Hungary for himself) in the Peace of Nikolsburg signed December 31, 1621. Bethlen's successor, George I Rákóczi, was equally successful. His principal achievement was the Peace of Linz (September 16, 1645), the last political triumph of Hungarian Protestantism, in which the emperor was forced to reconfirm the articles of the Peace of Vienna. Gabriel Bethlen and George I Rákóczi aided education and culture, and their reign has been called the golden era of Transylvania. They lavished money on their capital Alba Iulia (Gyulafehérvár or Weißenburg), which became the main bulwark of Protestantism in Central Europe. During their reign, Transylvania was one of the few European countries where Roman Catholics, Calvinists, Lutherans and Unitarians lived in mutual tolerance—all officially accepted religions (religiones recaepte). The Orthodox, however, still had inferior status.

This golden age (and relative independence) of Transylvania ended with the reign of George II Rákóczi. The prince, coveting the Polish crown, allied with Sweden and invaded Poland in 1657 despite the Ottoman Porte's prohibition of military action. Rákóczi was defeated in Poland and his army taken hostage by the Tatars. Chaotic years followed, with a quick succession of princes fighting one another and Rákóczi unwilling to resign, despite the Turkish threat of military attack. To resolve the political situation, the Turks resorted to military might; invasions of Transylvania with their Crimean Tatar allies, the ensuing loss of territory (particularly their primary Transylvanian stronghold, Várad, in 1660) and diminished manpower led to Prince John Kemény proclaiming the secession of Transylvania from the Ottomans in April 1661 and appealing for help to Vienna. A secret Habsburg-Ottoman agreement, however, prevented the Habsburgs from intervening; Kemény's defeat by the Turks (and the Turkish installation of the weak Mihály Apafi on the throne) marked the subordination of Transylvania, now a client state of the Ottoman Empire.

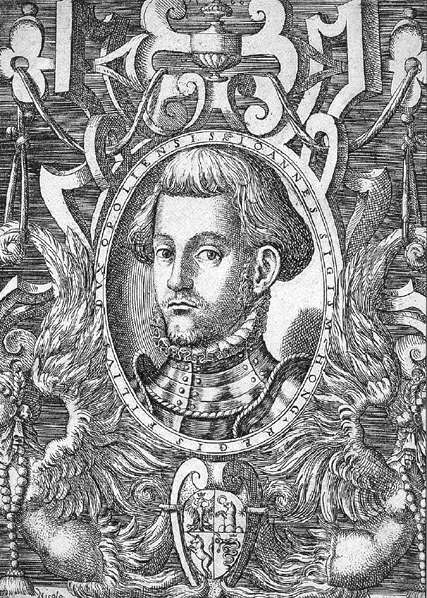
John Sigismund Zápolya, King of Hungary (1540–1551, 1556–1570), first Prince of Transylvania (1570–1571)

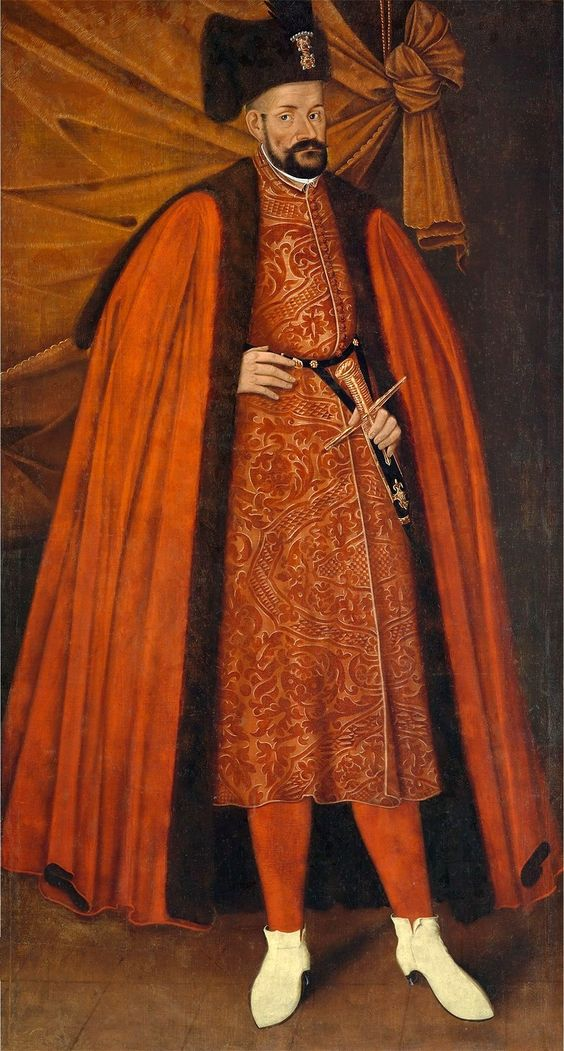
Stephen Báthory, Prince of Transylvania, King of Poland and Grand Duke of Lithuania (1576–1586)

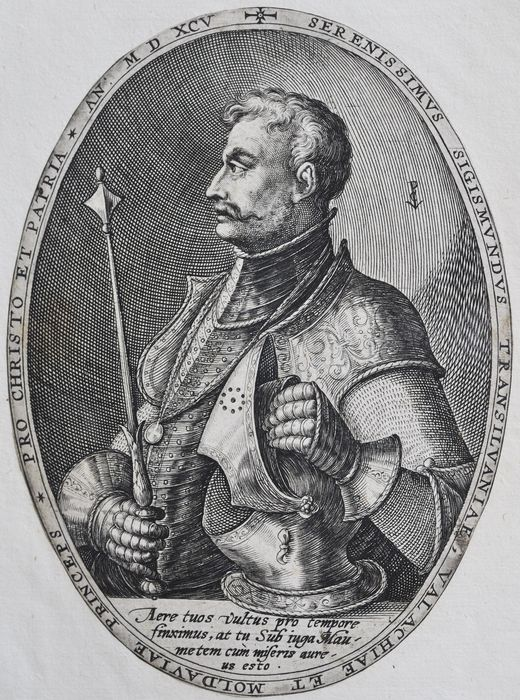
Sigismund Báthory, Prince of Transylvania (1586–1598, 1598–1599, 1601–1602), Wallachia and Moldavia (1595)

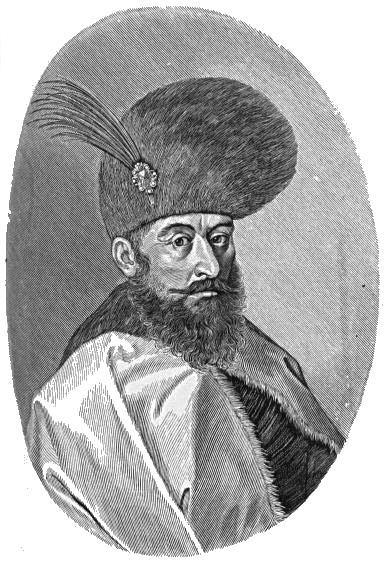
Michael the Brave, Prince of Wallachia (1593–1601) and Moldavia (1600), and self-styled deputy in Transylvania (1599–1600)

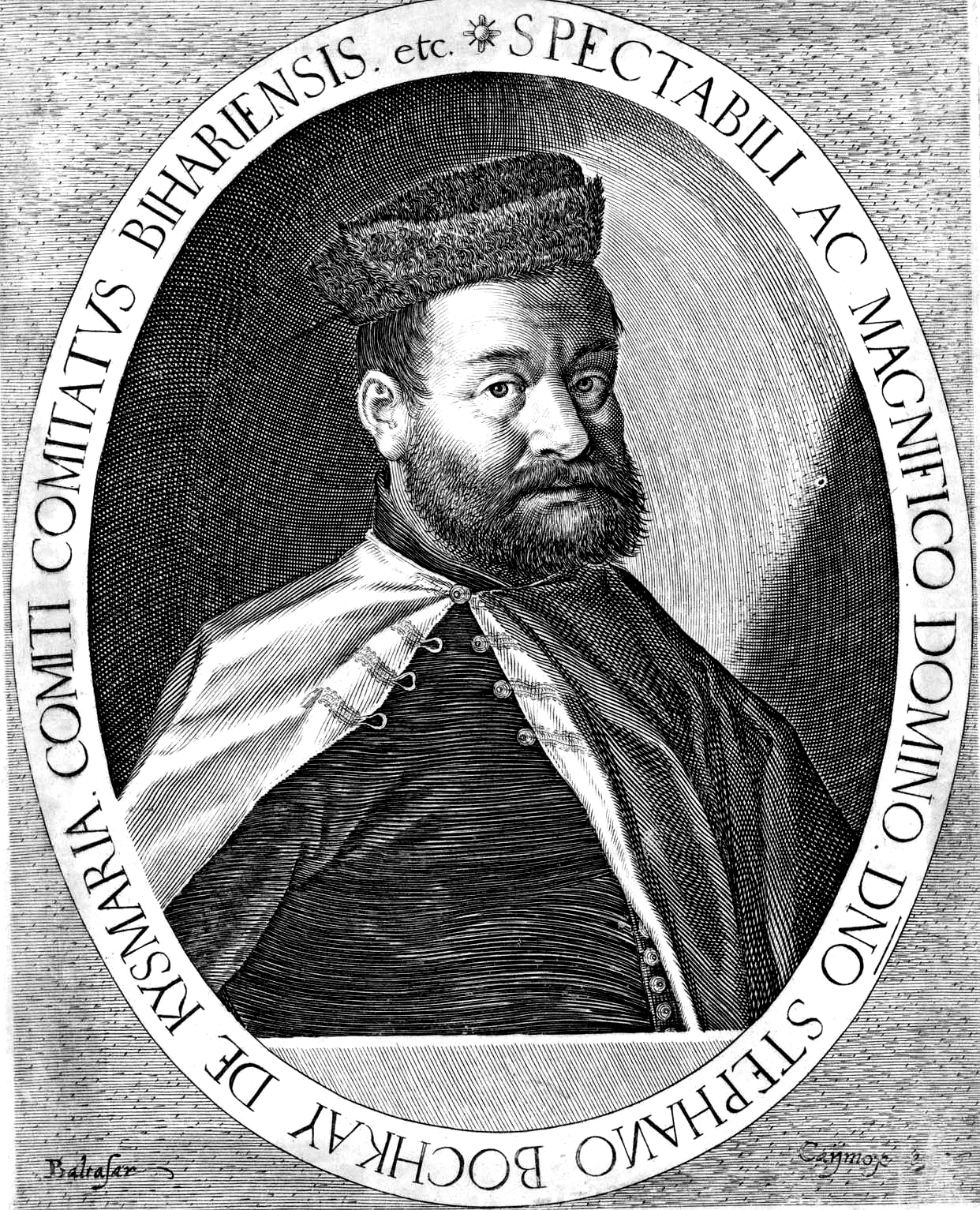
Stephen Bocskai, Prince of Transylvania and Hungary (1605–1606)

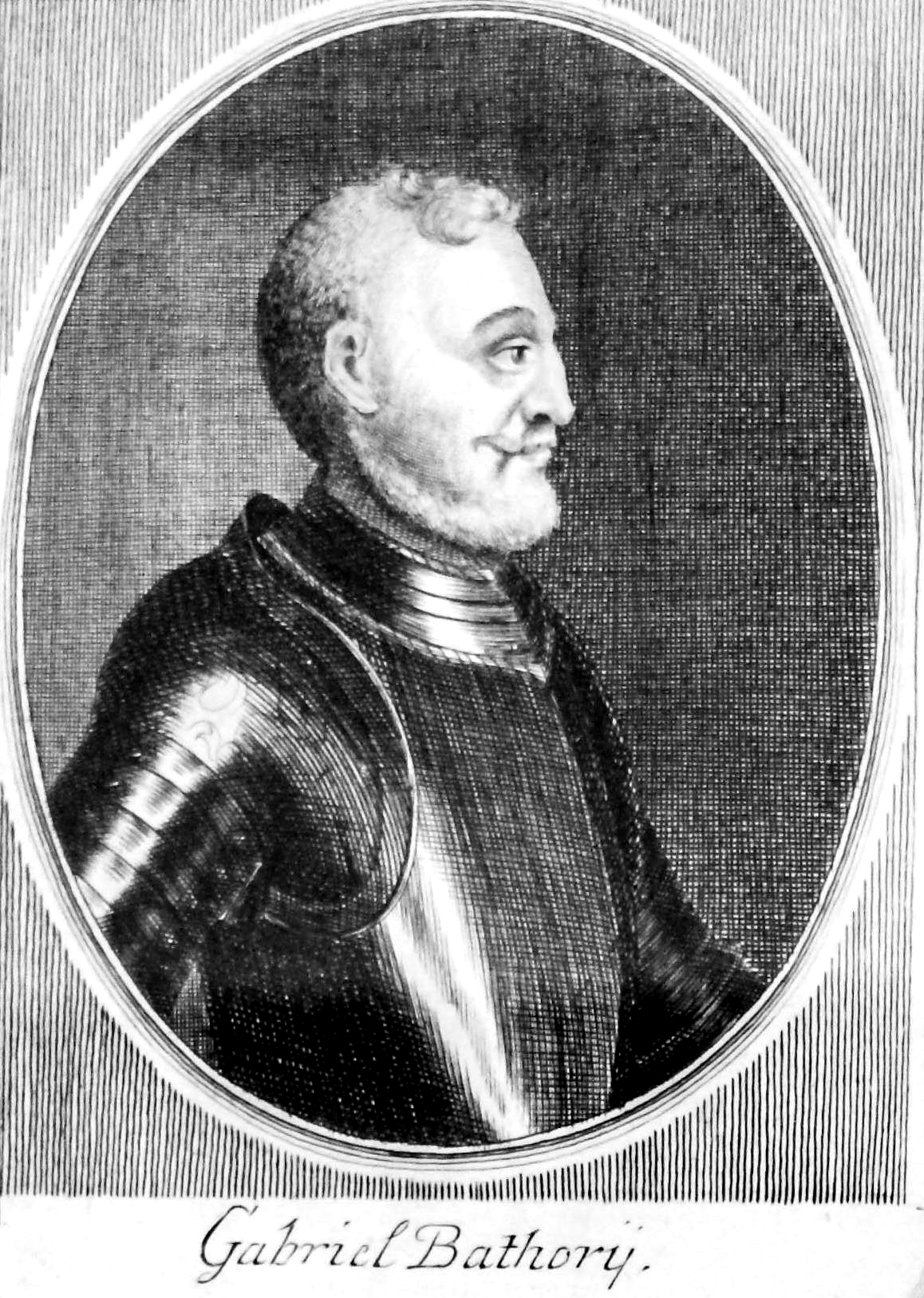
Gabriel Báthory, Prince of Transylvania (1608–1613)

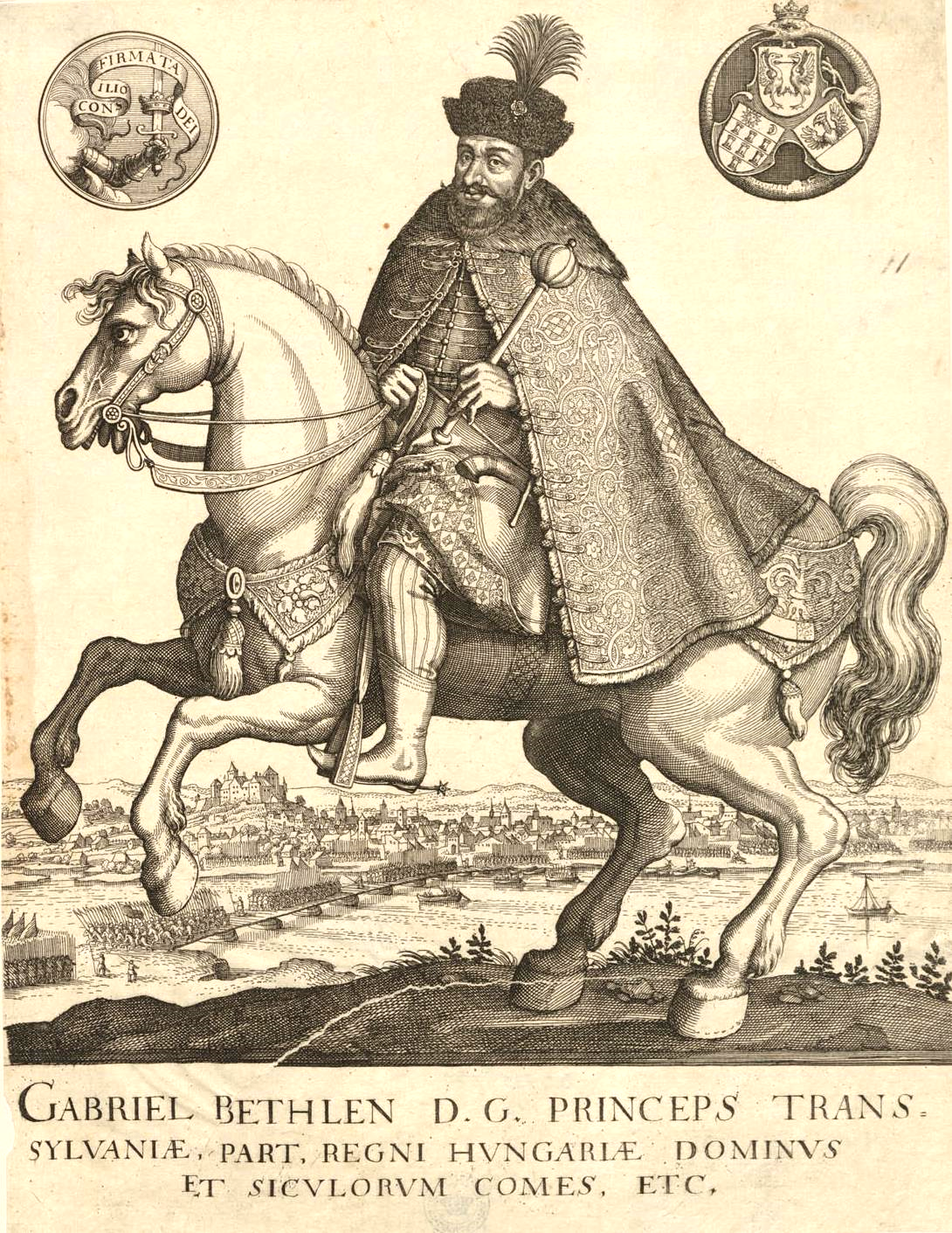
Gabriel Bethlen, Prince of Transylvania (1613–1629) and King of Hungary (1620-1621)

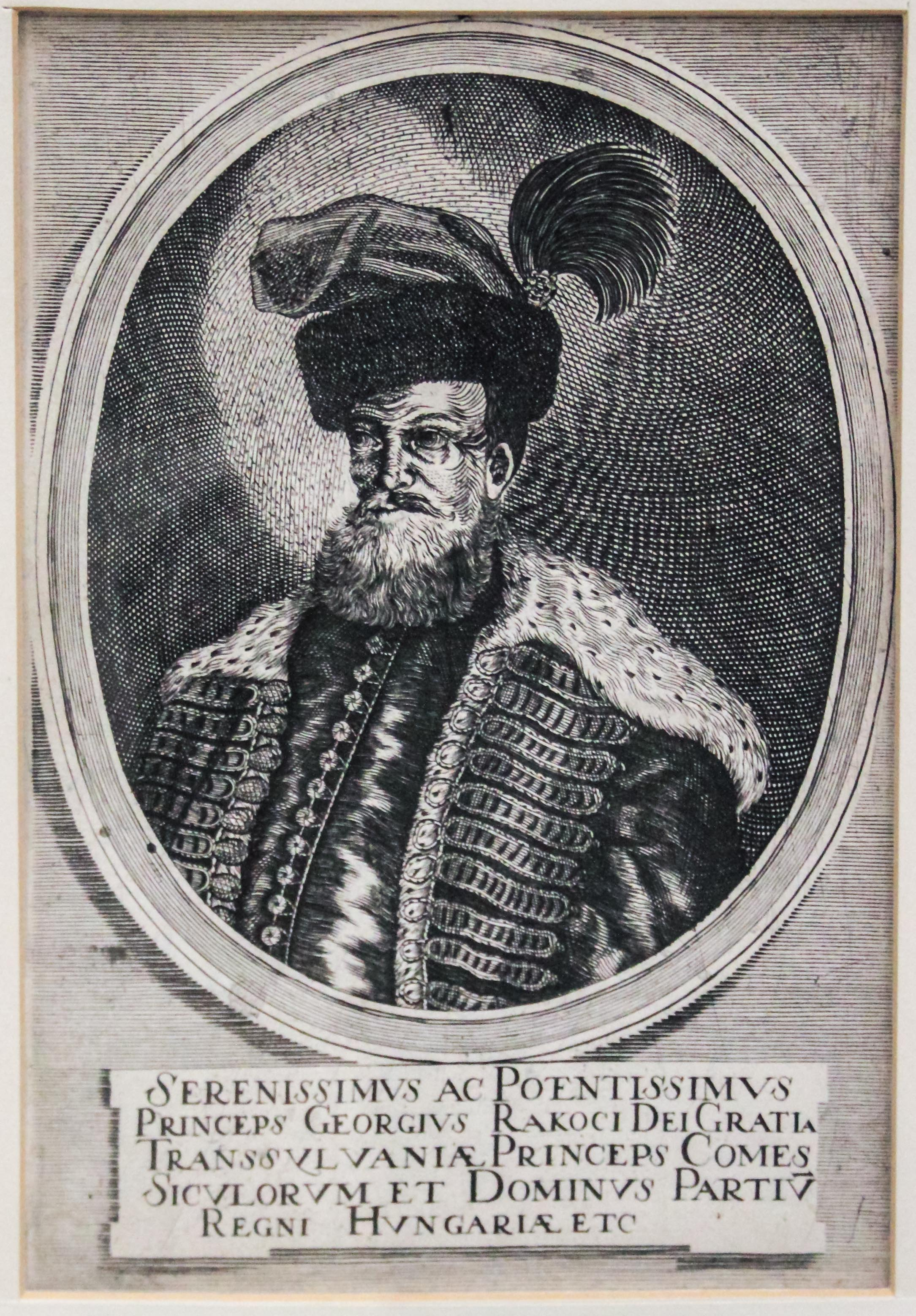
George I Rákóczi, Prince of Transylvania (1630–1648)

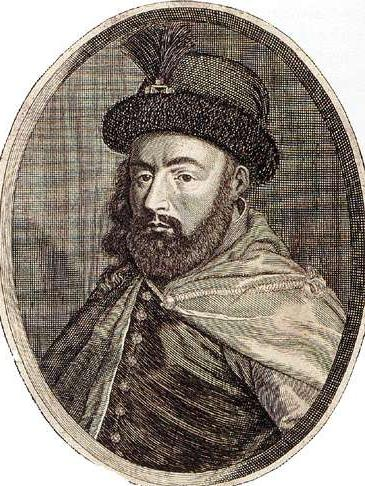
George II Rákóczi, Prince of Transylvania (1648–1657)

=== Habsburg rule ===
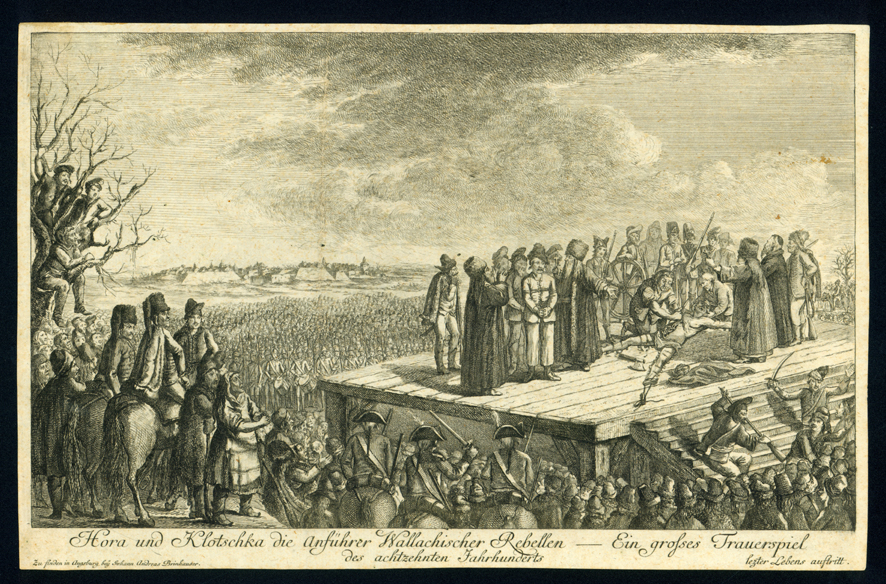
Public execution of Horea, Cloșca and Crișan

After the defeat of the Ottomans at the Battle of Vienna in 1683, the Habsburgs began to impose their rule on Transylvania. In addition to strengthening the central government and administration, they promoted the Roman Catholic Church as a uniting force and to weaken the influence of Protestant nobility. By creating a conflict between Protestants and Catholics, the Habsburgs hoped to weaken the estates. They also attempted to persuade Orthodox clergymen to join the Uniate (Greek Catholic) Church, which accepted four key points of Catholic doctrine and acknowledged papal authority while retaining Orthodox rituals and traditions. Emperor Leopold I decreed Transylvania's Eastern Orthodox Church in union with the Roman Catholic Church by joining the newly created Romanian Greek-Catholic Church. Some priests converted, although the similarity between the two denominations was unclear to many. In response to the Habsburg policy of converting all Romanian Orthodox to Greek-Catholics, several peaceful movements within the Romanian Orthodox population advocated freedom of worship for all Transylvanians; notable leaders were Visarion Sarai, Nicolae Oprea Miclăuș and Sofronie of Cioara.

From 1711 onward, Habsburg control over Transylvania was consolidated and Transylvanian princes were replaced with Habsburg imperial governors. In 1765 the Grand Principality of Transylvania was proclaimed, consolidating the separate status of Transylvania within the Habsburg monarchy established by the 1691 Diploma Leopoldinum. This was a formality.

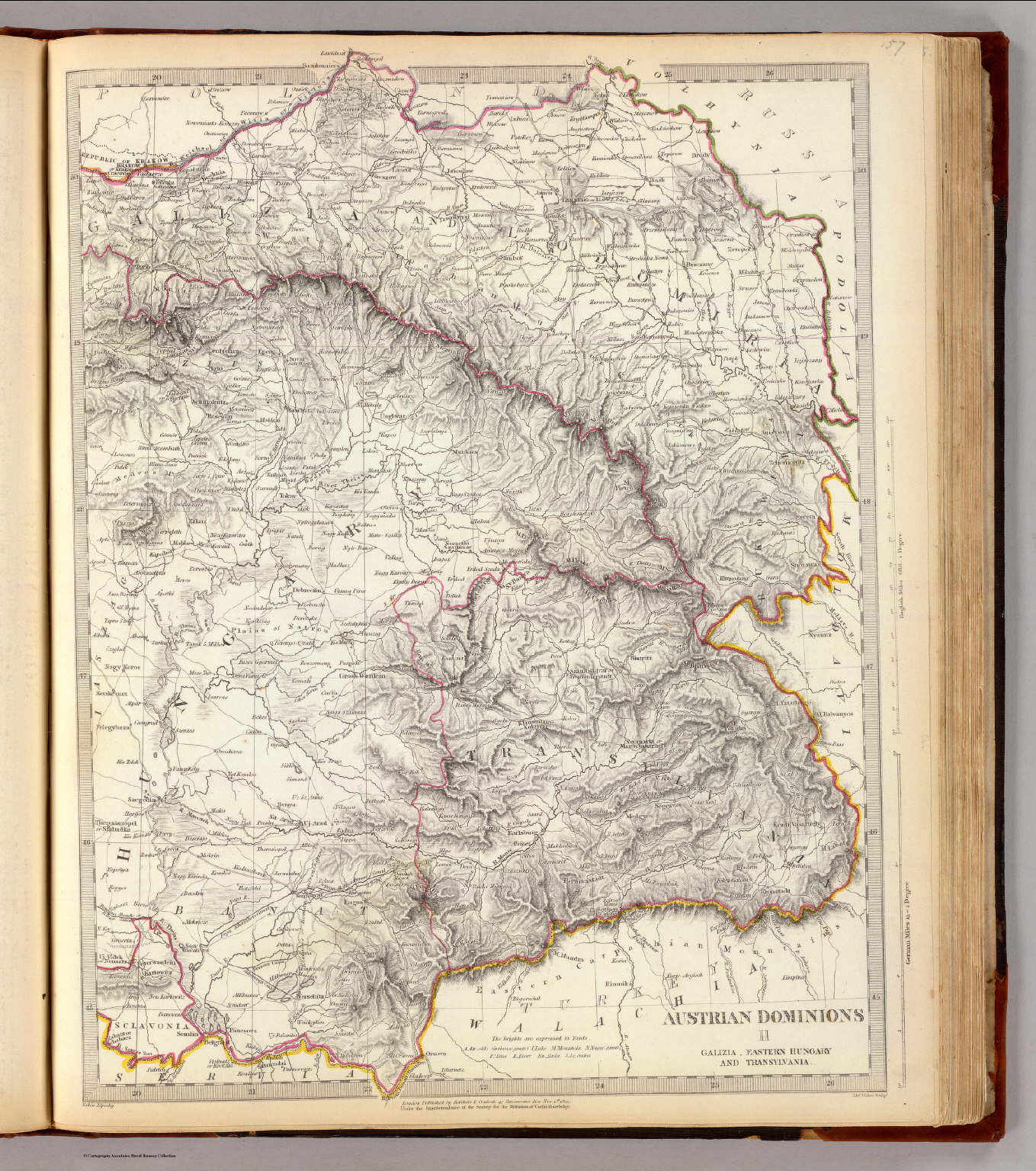
Transylvania, Hungary and Galicia

On November 2, 1784, a revolt detonated by Romanian peasant leaders Horea, Cloșca and Crișan began in Hunyad County and spread throughout the Apuseni Mountains. The insurgents' main demands were related to feudal serfdom and the lack of political equality between Romanians and other Transylvanian ethnic groups. They fought at Topánfalva (Topesdorf/Câmpeni), Abrudbánya (Großschlatten/Abrud) and Verespatak (Goldbach/Roșia), defeating the Habsburg Imperial Army at Brád (Tannenhof/Brad) on November 27, 1784. The revolt was crushed on February 28, 1785, at Dealul Furcilor (Forks Hill), Alba-Iulia, when the leaders were apprehended. Horea and Cloșca were executed by breaking on the wheel; Crișan hanged himself the night before his execution.

In 1791 the Romanians petitioned Emperor Leopold II for religious equality and recognition as a fourth "nation" in Transylvania (Supplex Libellus Valachorum). The Transylvanian Diet rejected their demands, restoring the Romanians to their marginalised status.

== Late modern period ==
=== Revolutions of 1848 ===
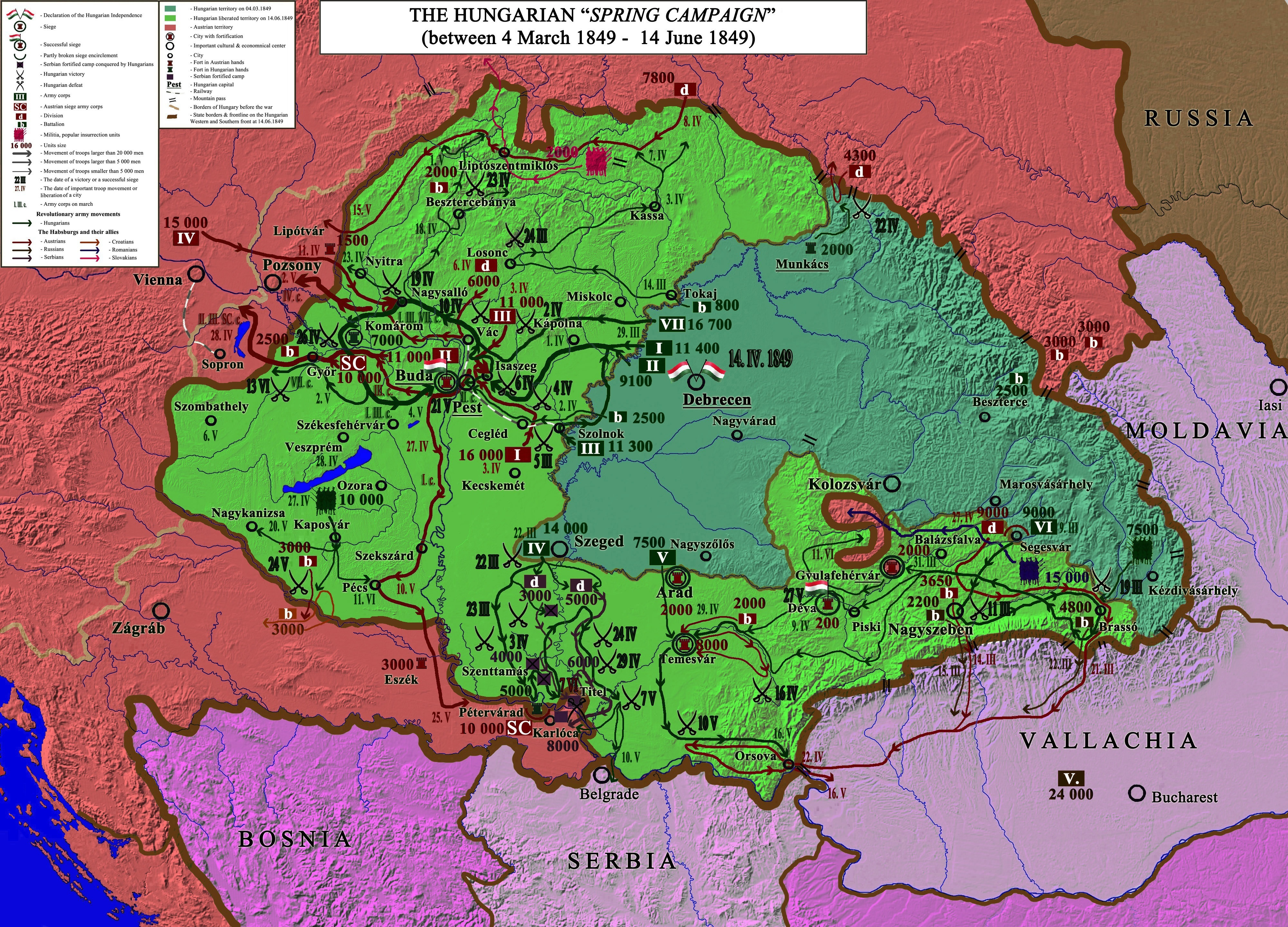
The Hungarian Spring Campaign in 1849, and liberation of much of Hungary until 15 June 1849, before the Russian intervention started

In early 1848, the Hungarian Diet took the opportunity presented by revolution to enact a comprehensive program of legislative reform (the April laws), which included a provision for the union of Transylvania and Hungary. Transylvanian Romanians initially welcomed the revolution, believing they would benefit from the reforms. However, their position changed due to the opposition of Transylvanian nobles to the Hungarian reforms (such as emancipation of the serfs) and the failure of Hungarian revolutionary leaders to recognise Romanian national interests. In mid-May a Romanian diet at Balázsfalva produced its own revolutionary program, calling for proportional representation of Romanians in the Transylvanian Diet and an end to social and ethnic oppression. The Saxons were concerned about union with Hungary, fearing the loss of their traditional medieval origin privileges. When the Transylvanian Diet met on May 29, the vote for union was pushed through despite objections from many Saxon deputies. On June 10, the Emperor sanctioned the union vote of the Diet. Military executions and the arrest of revolutionary leaders after the union hardened the Saxons' position.

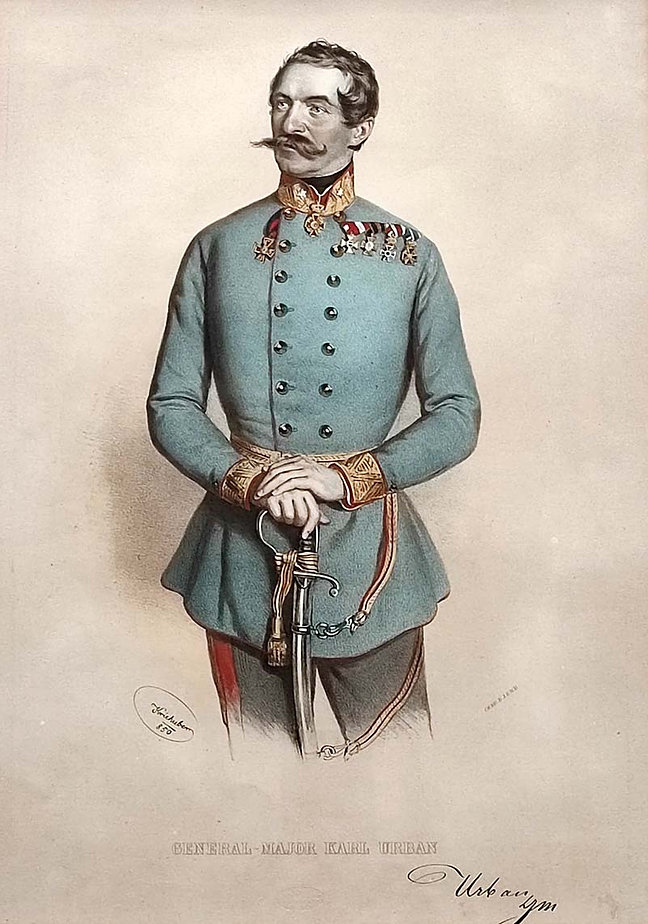
Karl von Urban

In September 1848, the Austrian commander Karl von Urban was the first to make a stand against the Revolution. He summoned leaders of all 44 districts of the Principality to his headquarters in Naszód (Năsăud) on 10 September, and offered protection both to villages that rejected conscription and to the landowners who feared a peasant rising. Urban then administered the oath of allegiance to the hundreds of peasants and village delegate, finally denouncing the Revolution in a Memorandum widely distributed. Von Urban acted in such a compelling manner that, by the end of September, 918 communities in the region had distanced themselves from the Revolution and were won over to the Imperial and Counter-revolutionary cause. This dealt a fatal blow to the power of the revolutionary party in Transylvania.

Soon after, another Romanian assembly in Balázsfalva (Blaj) denounced the union with Hungary and called for an armed uprising in Transylvania. War broke out in November, with Austrian troops led by Karl von Urban and Romanian and Saxon insurgents battling Hungarians led by Polish general Józef Bem. Within four months, Bem had ousted the Austrians from Transylvania. However, in June 1849 Tsar Nicholas I of Russia responded to an appeal from Emperor Franz Joseph to send Russian troops into Transylvania. After initial successes against the Russians, Bem's army was defeated decisively at the Battle of Temesvár (Timișoara) on August 9; the surrender of Hungary followed.

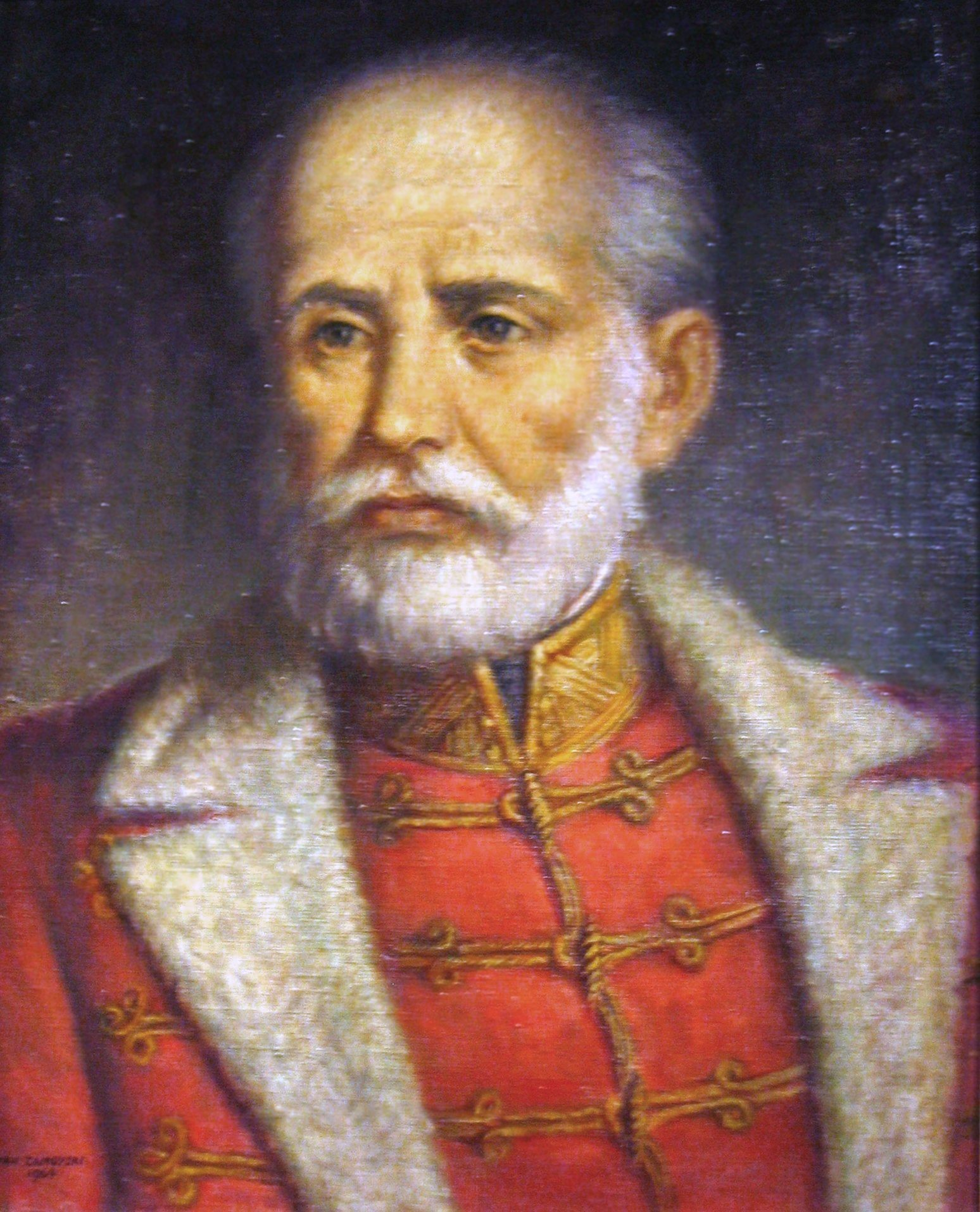
Józef Bem

The Austrians clearly rejected the October demand that ethnic criteria become the basis for internal borders, with the goal of creating a province for Romanians (Transylvania, alongside Banat and Bukovina); they did not want to replace the threat of Hungarian nationalism with a potential one of Romanian separatism. However, they did not declare themselves hostile to the creation of Romanian administrative offices in Transylvania (which prevented Hungary from including the region in all but name). The territory was organized into prefecturi (prefectures), with Avram Iancu and Buteanu two prefects in the Apuseni Mountains. Iancu's prefecture, the Auraria Gemina (a name charged with Latin symbolism), became important; it took over from bordering areas which were never fully organized.

Administrative efforts were then halted as Hungarians, under Józef Bem, carried out an offensive through Transylvania. With the covert assistance of Imperial Russian troops, the Austrian army (except for garrisons at Gyulafehérvár and Déva) and the Austrian-Romanian administration retreated to Wallachia and Wallachian Oltenia (both were under Russian occupation). The last remaining resistance force was that of Avram Iancu: he retreated to harsh terrain, mounting a guerrilla campaign on Bem's forces, causing severe damage and blocking the route to Gyulafehérvár (Alba Iulia). He was, however, challenged by severe shortages: the Romanians had few guns and very little gunpowder. The conflict dragged on for several months, with all Hungarian attempts to seize the mountain stronghold repulsed.

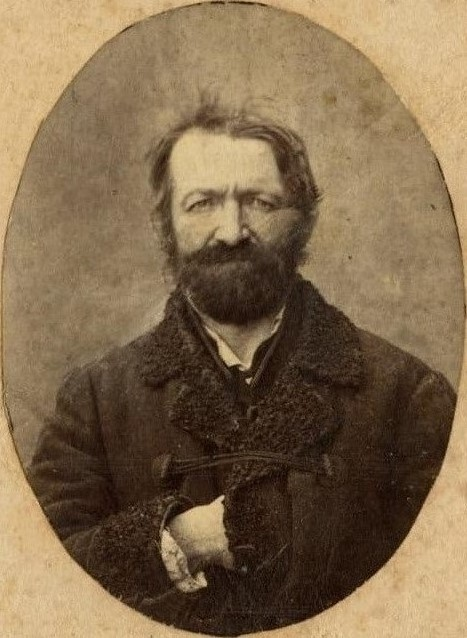
Avram Iancu

In April 1849, Iancu was approached by Hungarian envoy Ioan Dragoș (a Romanian deputy in the Hungarian Parliament). Dragoș was apparently acting from a desire for peace, and he worked to have Romanian leaders meet him in Abrudbánya (today Abrud) and listen to the Hungarian demands. Iancu's adversary, Hungarian commander Imre Hatvany, seems to have exploited the provisional armistice to attack the Romanians in Abrudbánya. However, Iancu and his men retreated and encircled him.

Hatvany angered the Romanians by having Buteanu captured and murdered. As his position became weaker, he was attacked by Iancu's men until his defeat on May 22. Hatvany and most of his armed group were massacred by their adversaries; Iancu captured their cannons, switching the tactical advantage for the next several months. Lajos Kossuth was angered by Hatvany's gesture (an inspection at the time dismissed all of Hatvany's close collaborators), since it made future negotiations unlikely.

However, the conflict became less harsh: Iancu's men concentrated on seizing local resources and supplies, opting to inflict losses only through skirmishes. The Russian intervention in June precipitated an escalation, since the Poles fighting in the Hungarian revolutionary contingents wanted to resist the Tsarist armies. Henryk Dembiński, a Polish general, negotiated for a truce between Kossuth and the Wallachian émigré revolutionaries. The latter, who were close to Iancu (especially Nicolae Bălcescu, Gheorghe Magheru, Alexandru G. Golescu, and Ion Ghica) wanted to defeat the Russian armies that had crushed their movement in September 1848.

Bălcescu and Kossuth met in May 1849 at Debrecen. The contact has long been celebrated by Romanian Marxist historians and politicians. Karl Marx's condemnation of everything opposing Kossuth led to any Romanian initiative being automatically considered "reactionary". The agreement was not a pact: Kossuth flattered the Wallachians, encouraging them to persuade Iancu's armies leaving Transylvania to help Bălcescu in Bucharest. While agreeing to mediate for peace, Bălcescu never presented these terms to the fighters in the Apuseni Mountains. All Iancu agreed to was the neutrality of his forces in the conflict between Russia and Hungary. Thus, he secured his position as the Hungarian armies suffered defeats in July (culminating in the Battle of Segesvár) and capitulated on August 13.

After quashing the revolution, Austria imposed a repressive regime on Hungary and ruled Transylvania directly through a military governor, with German as the official language. Austria abolished the Union of Three Nations and acknowledged the Romanians. Although the former serfs were given land by the Austrian authorities, it was often barely sufficient for subsistence living. These poor conditions caused many Romanian families to cross into Wallachia and Moldavia in search for better lives.

Romanian nationalists Sterca-Șuluțiu, Bariț, Bărnuțiu and Laurian demanded that the "other nations of Transylvania should call the Romanian nation Romanian, not oláh or walach". The 1849 Transylvanian national assembly accepted this demand.

=== Austro-Hungarian Empire ===
Austria-Hungary

Due to external and internal problems, reforms seemed inevitable to secure the integrity of the Habsburg Empire. Major Austrian military defeats (such as the 1866 Battle of Königgrätz) forced Austrian emperor Franz Joseph to concede internal reforms. To appease Hungarian separatism, the emperor made a deal with Hungary (the Austro-Hungarian Compromise of 1867, negotiated by Ferenc Deák) by which the dual monarchy of Austria–Hungary came into existence. The two realms were governed separately by two parliaments from two capitals, with a common monarch and common external and military policies. Economically, the empire was a customs union. The first prime minister of Hungary after the Compromise was Count Gyula Andrássy. The old Hungarian Constitution was restored, and Franz Joseph was crowned as King of Hungary. Romanian intellectuals issued the Blaj Pronouncement in protest of the Compromise.

The era saw considerable economic development, with the GNP per capita growing roughly 1.45 percent annually from 1870 to 1913. That level of growth compared favorably with that of other European nations, such as Britain (1.00 percent), France (1.06 percent), and Germany (1.51 percent). Technological growth accelerated industrialization and urbanization. Many state institutions and the modern administrative system of Hungary were established during this period. However, as a result of the Compromise the special status of Transylvania ended; it became a province under the Hungarian diet. While part of Austria-Hungary, Transylvania's Romanians were oppressed by the Hungarian administration through Magyarization; German Saxons were also subject to this policy. During this time, Hungarian-administered Transylvania consisted of a 15-county (Hungarian: megye) region, covering 54,400 km^{2} in the southeast of the former Kingdom of Hungary. The Hungarian counties at the time were Alsó-Fehér, Beszterce-Naszód, Brassó, Csík, Fogaras, Háromszék, Hunyad, Kis-Küküllő, Kolozs, Maros-Torda, Nagy-Küküllő, Szeben, Szolnok-Doboka, Torda-Aranyos, and Udvarhely.

=== First World War ===
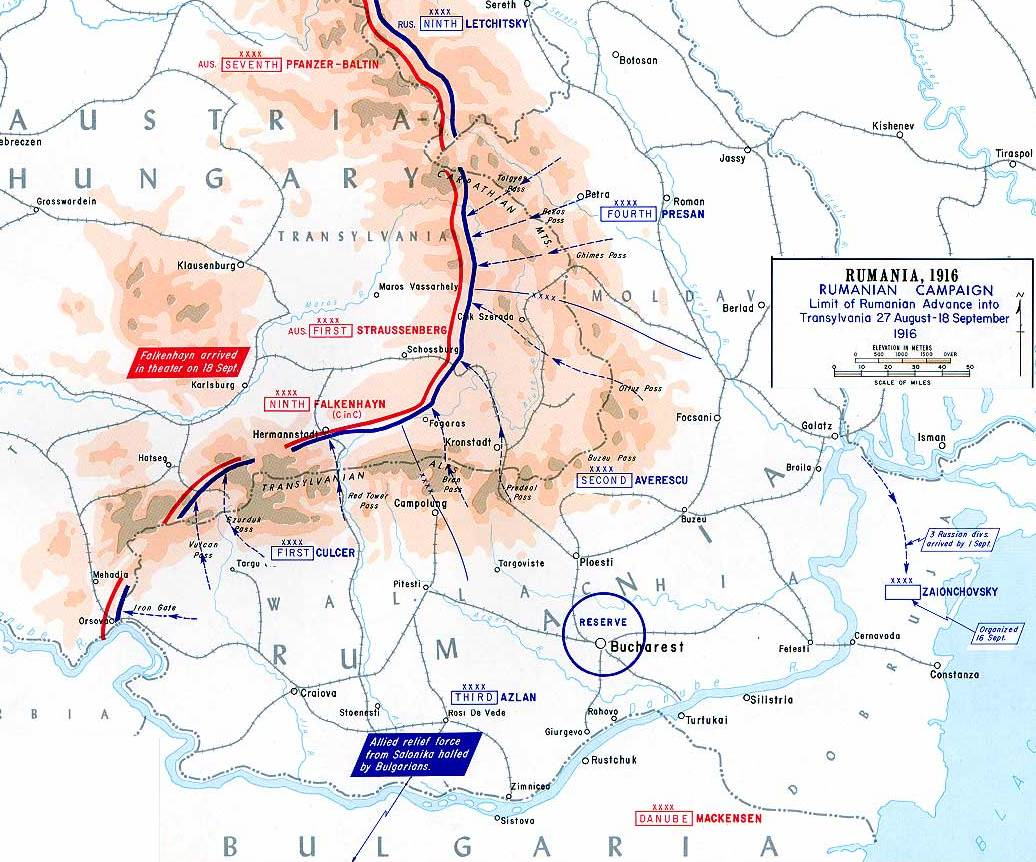
Romanian invasion of Austria-Hungary, August 1916

At the outbreak of World War I, the Kingdom of Romania refused to join the Central Powers and remained neutral, although Kings Carol I and Ferdinand I were from the German Hohenzollern dynasty.

On 17 August 1916, Romania signed a secret treaty (the Treaty of Bucharest, 1916) with the Entente Powers (United Kingdom, France, Italy and Russia), according to which the Allies agreed that Transylvania, Banat, and Partium would become part of Romania after the War if it entered the war. Romania joined the Triple Entente after signing the treaty and declared war against the Central Powers on 27 August 1916. It crossed the Carpathian Mountains into Transylvania, forcing the Central Powers to fight on another front. A German-Bulgarian counter-offensive began the following month in Dobruja and in the Carpathians, driving the Romanian army back into Romania by mid-October and eventually leading to the capture of Bucharest. The exit of Russia from the war in March 1918 with the Treaty of Brest-Litovsk left Romania alone in Eastern Europe, and a peace treaty between Romania and Germany was negotiated in May (the Treaty of Bucharest, 1918). By mid-1918 the Central Powers were losing the war on the Western Front, and the Austro-Hungarian empire had begun to disintegrate. Austria-Hungary signed a general armistice in Padua on 3 November 1918, and the nations inside Austria-Hungary proclaimed their independence from the empire during September and October of that year.

King Ferdinand's wife, Marie (who had British and Russian parentage) was highly influential during these years.

==== Interbellum ====
The demarcation line (marked in solid red) under the armistice of Belgrade. Most Hungarian forces were to withdraw north of the line. The dashed and dotted lines represent Czechoslovak and Vix Note demands, respectively.

In 1918, as a result of the German defeat in World War I the Austro-Hungarian monarchy collapsed. On October 31, the successful Aster Revolution in Budapest brought the left liberal, pro-Entente count Mihály Károlyi to power as prime minister of Hungary. Influenced by Woodrow Wilson's pacifism, Károlyi ordered the disarmament of Hungarian Army. The Károlyi government outlawed all Hungarian armed associations and proposals intending to defend the country.

The resulting Treaty of Bucharest, 1918 was denounced in October 1918 by the Romanian government, which then re-entered the war on the Allied side and advanced to the Mureș (Maros) river in Transylvania.

The leaders of Transylvania's Romanian National Party met and drafted a resolution invoking the right of self-determination (influenced by Woodrow Wilson's 14 points) for Transylvania's Romanian people, and proclaimed the unification of Transylvania with Romania. In October the Romanian National Council, representing all Romanians in Transylvania, notified the Budapest government that it would take control of twenty-four Transylvanian counties (and parts of three others) and requested a Hungarian response by November 12. The Hungarian government (after negotiations with the council) rejected the proposal, claiming that it failed to secure the rights of the ethnic Hungarian and German populations. As a result the Romanian National Council decided for a grand assembly within 10 days and on December 1, in Gyulafehérvár (Alba Iulia), the Great National Assembly of Alba Iulia, composed of Romanian political delegates and the newly formed paramilitary wing Romanian National Guards passed a resolution calling for the unification of all Romanians in a single state. The National Council of Transylvanian Germans and the Council of the Danube Swabians from the Banat approved the proclamation on 8 January 1919. In response, the Hungarian General Assembly of Kolozsvár (Cluj) reaffirmed the loyalty of Hungarians from Transylvania to Hungary on December 22, 1918.

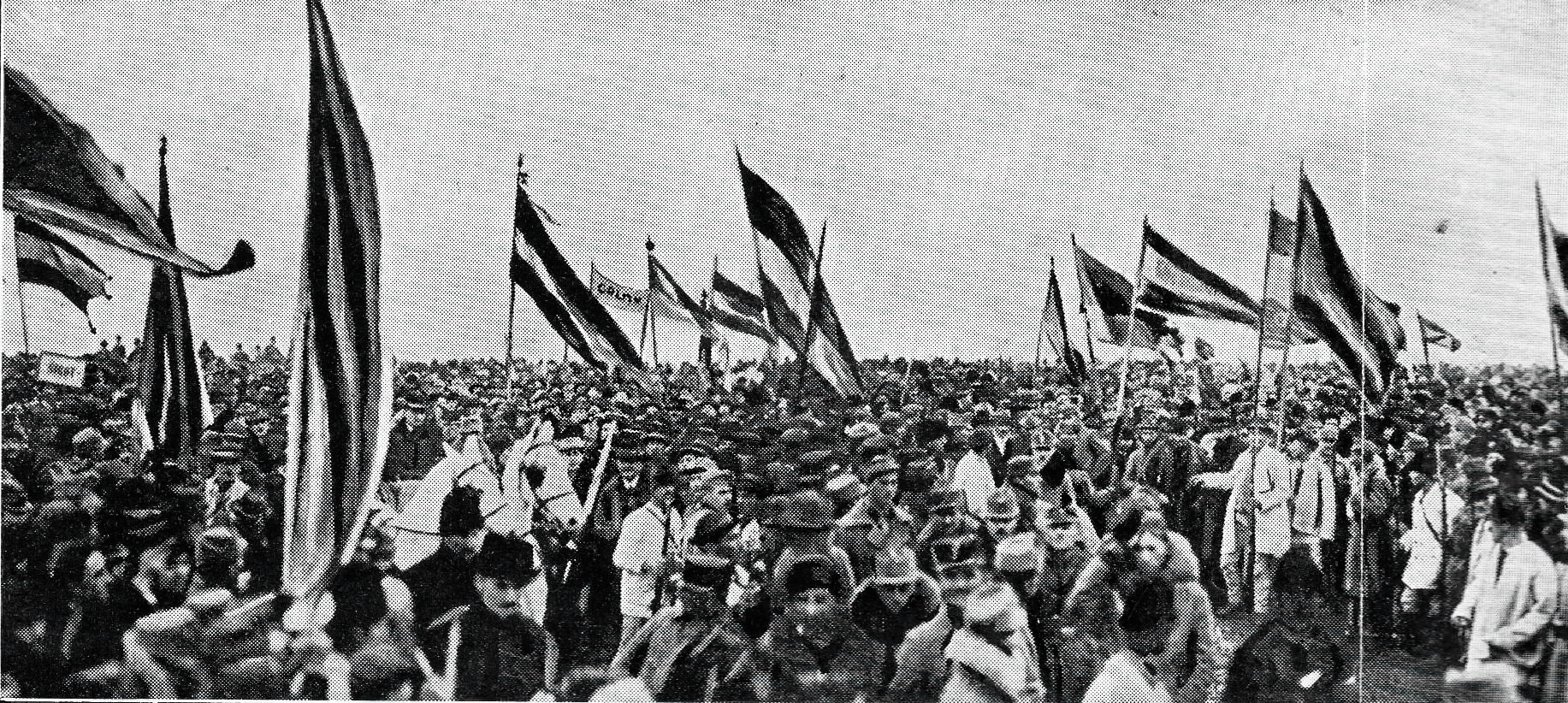
Picture of the Great National Assembly of Alba Iulia, taken by Samoilă Mârza

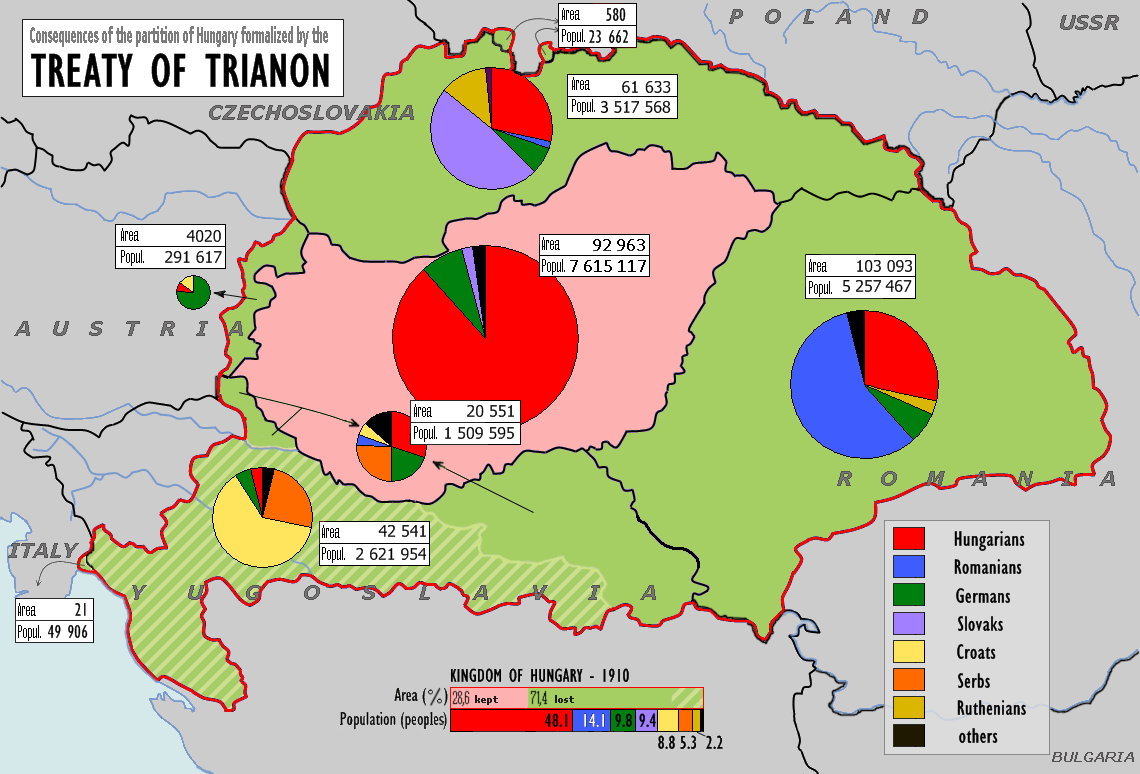
Ethnic composition and partition of Hungary after World War I

The Romanian Army, representing the Entente powers, entered Transylvania from the east on November 12, 1918. In December they entered southern Transylvania, crossed the demarcation line on the Maros (Mureș) river by mid-December and advanced to Kolozsvár (Cluj) and Máramarossziget (Sighet) after making a request to the Powers of Versailles to protect the Romanians in Transylvania. In February 1919, to prevent armed clashes between Romanian and withdrawing Hungarian troops, a neutral zone was created.

The prime minister of the newly proclaimed Republic of Hungary resigned in March 1919, refusing the territorial concessions (including Transylvania) demanded by the Entente. When the Communist Party of Hungary (led by Béla Kun) came to power in March 1919, it proclaimed the Hungarian Soviet Republic; after promising that Hungary would regain the lands under its control during the Austro-Hungarian Empire it attacked Czechoslovakia and Romania, leading to the Hungarian-Romanian War of 1919. The Hungarian army began an April 1919 offensive in Transylvania along the Someș (Szamos) and Maros rivers. A Romanian counter-offensive pushed forward to reach the Tisza River in May. Another Hungarian offensive in July penetrated 60 km into Romanian lines before a further Romanian counter-offensive led to the end of Hungarian Soviet Republic and after the occupation of Budapest. The Romanian army withdrew from Hungary between October 1919 and March 1920.

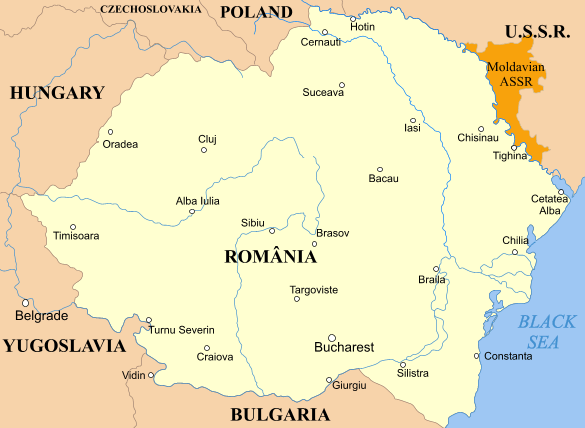
Great Romania (1920–1940)

România Mare ("Great Romania") refers to the Romanian state between the First and Second World Wars. Romania reached its greatest territorial extent, uniting almost all historical Romanian lands (except Northern Maramureș, Western Banat and small areas of Partium and Crișana). Great Romania was an ideal of Romanian nationalism.

At the end of World War I the Deputies of Transylvanian Romanians declared the union of Transylvania with Romania in Alba Iulia on 1. December 1918.; Bessarabia, having declared independence from Russia in 1917 at the Conference of the Country (Sfatul Țării) which proclaimed the union with Romania and called in Romanian troops to protect the province from the Bolsheviks. The union of Bukovina and Bessarabia with Romania was ratified in 1920 by the Treaty of Versailles. Romania had also acquired Southern Dobrudja from Bulgaria as a result of its victory in the Second Balkan War in 1913. The Treaty of Trianon (4 June 1920) defined the new borders with Hungary, assigning Transylvania and parts of Banat, Crișana, and Maramureș to the Kingdom of Romania. King Ferdinand I of Romania and Queen Maria of Romania were crowned at Alba Iulia in 1922.

== Contemporary history ==
=== Second World War and Communist period ===
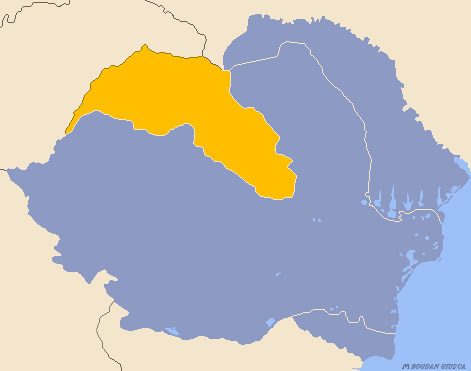
Romania in 1940 with Northern Transylvania highlighted in yellow

Romania's territorial losses in the summer of 1940

In August 1940, during the Second World War, the northern half of Transylvania (Northern Transylvania) was annexed to Hungary by the second Second Vienna Award, leaving Southern Transylvania to Romania. On March 19, 1944, following the occupation of Hungary by the Nazi German army through Operation Margarethe, Northern Transylvania came under German military occupation. After King Michael's Coup, Romania left the Axis and joined the Allies, and, as such, fought together with the Soviet Union's Red Army against Nazi Germany, regaining Northern Transylvania. The Second Vienna Award was voided by the Allied Commission through the Armistice Agreement with Romania (September 12, 1944) whose Article 19 stipulated the following:

The Allied Governments regard the decision of the Vienna award regarding Transylvania as null and void and are agreed that Transylvania (or the greater part thereof) should be returned to Rumania, subject to confirmation at the peace settlement, and the Soviet Government agrees that Soviet forces shall take part for this purpose in joint military operations with Rumania against Germany and Hungary.

The 1947 Treaty of Paris reaffirmed the borders between Romania and Hungary, as originally defined in Treaty of Trianon, 27 years earlier, thus confirming the return of Northern Transylvania to Romania. From 1947 to 1989, Transylvania, as the rest of Romania, was under a communist regime.

In 1950, Romania adopted a Soviet-style administrative and territorial division of the country into regions and raions (until then, Romania had been divided into județe or counties).

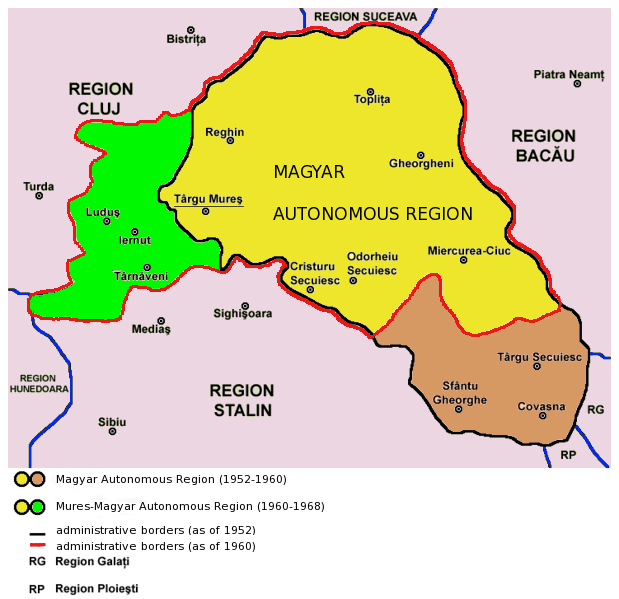
The Magyar Autonomous Region in Romania, in 1952–1968.

Two years later, in 1952, under Soviet pressure, the number of regions was reduced and by comprising ten raions from the former Mureș Region and from the Stalin Region (both of them created in 1950), of the territory inhabited by a compact population of Székely Hungarians, a new region called the Magyar Autonomous Region was created. According to the 1956 census, the total population of the region was 731,361, distributed among the ethnic groups as follows: Hungarians (77.3%), Romanians (20.1%), Roma (1.5%), Germans (0.4%) and Jews (0.4%). The official languages of the province were Hungarian and Romanian and the provincial administrative centre was Târgu Mureș (Marosvásárhely).

In December 1960, a governmental decree modified the boundaries of the Magyar Autonomous Region. Its southern raions were reattached to Brașov Region (former Stalin Region) and in place of this, several raions were joined to it from Cluj Region. The region was called the Mureș Region-Magyar Autonomous, after the Mureș River. The ratio of Hungarians was thus reduced from 77.3% to 62%. According to Kopyś, this was done to water down the proportion of Hungarians in preparation to eventually abolishing the autonomy of the region.

In 1968, the Great National Assembly put an end to the soviet style administrative division of the country into regions and re-introduced the historical județ (county) system, still used today. This also automatically eliminated the Mureș-Magyar Autonomous Region and replaced it with counties that are not identified with any nationality. The two new counties formed on the majority of the territory of former Mureș-Magyar Autonomous Region are Mureș County and Harghita County, plus one from the former Magyar Autonomous Region until 1960 and part of the Brașov Region in 1968, Covasna County.

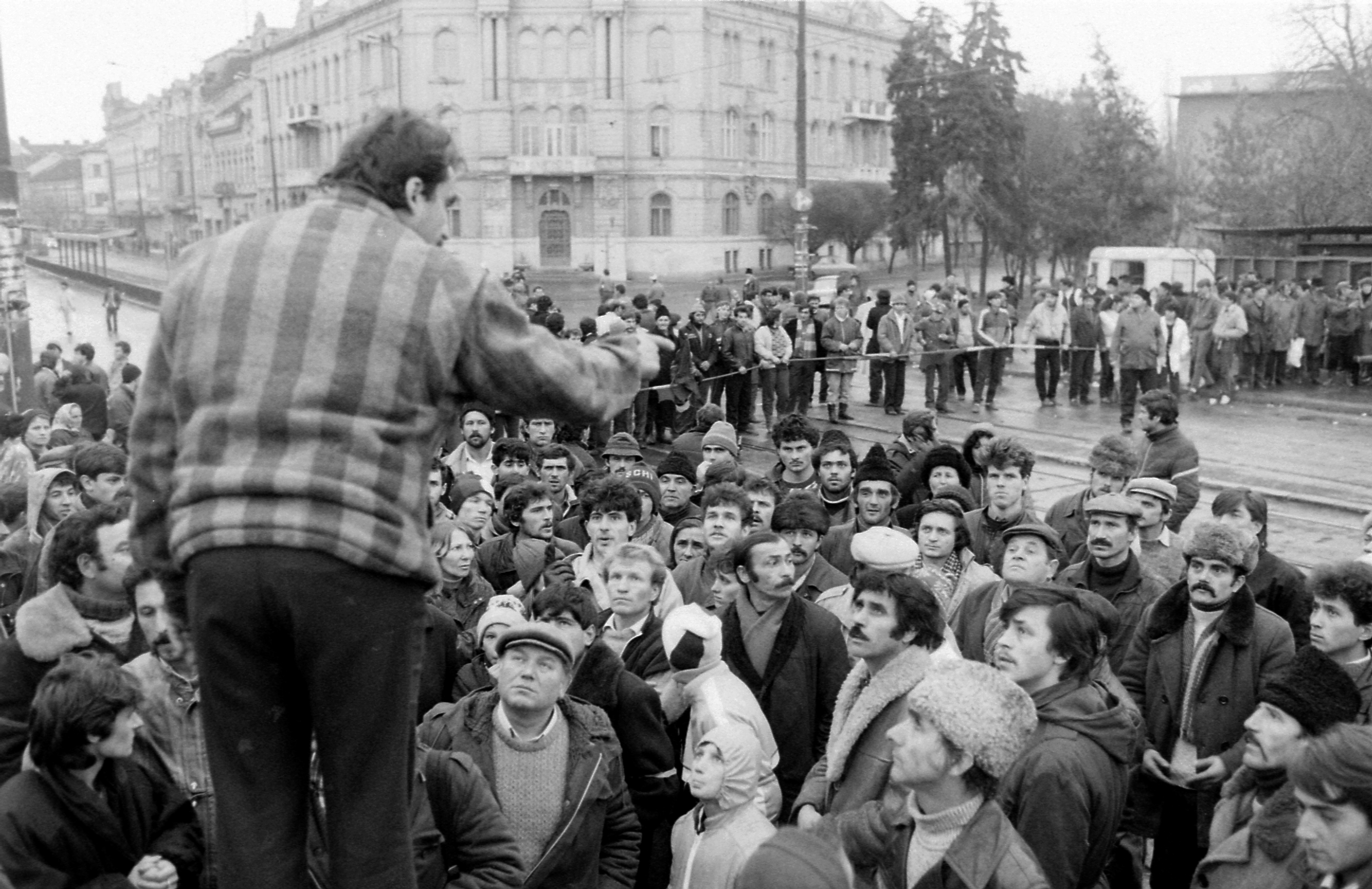
Demonstration in Timișoara

Amid tensions in the late 1980s, early protests occurred in the city of Timișoara in mid-December on the part of the Hungarian minority in response to an attempt by the government to evict Hungarian Reformed Church pastor László Tőkés. In response, Romanians sought the deposition of Ceaușescu and a change in government in light of similar recent events in neighbouring nations. Riots and protests resumed the following day.

On the morning of 21 December, Ceaușescu addressed an assembly of approximately 100,000 people to condemn the uprising in Timișoara. The protest demonstration soon erupted into a riot; the crowd took to the streets, placing the capital, like Timișoara, in turmoil. The revolution ultimately resulted in the fall of Ceausescu and the communist regime.

=== Post-Communist period ===
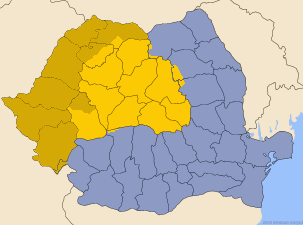
Map of Romania, with "Transylvania proper" in bright yellow

Today, "Transylvania proper" is included within the Romanian counties (județe) of Alba, Bistrița-Năsăud, Brașov, Cluj, Covasna, Harghita, Hunedoara, Mureș, Sălaj and Sibiu. In addition to Transylvania proper, modern Transylvania includes parts of the Banat, Crișana and Maramureș; these regions are in the counties of Arad, Bihor, Caraș-Severin, Maramureș, Sălaj, Satu Mare and Timiș.

== Demographics and historical research ==
There is an ongoing scholarly debate among Hungarian and Romanian historians regarding the medieval population of Transylvania. While some Romanian historians claim there was a continuous Romanian majority, Hungarian historians argue that Romanians continuously settled in the Kingdom of Hungary.

== Coat of arms of Transylvania ==
Transylvanian coat of arms

The first heraldic representations of Transylvania date from the 16th century. The Diet of 1659 codified the representation of the privileged nations (Unio Trium Nationum (Union of the Three Nations)) in Transylvania's coat of arms. It depicted a black eagle (Turul) on a blue background, representing the Hungarians, the Sun and the Moon representing the Székelys, and seven red towers on a yellow background representing the seven fortified cities of the Transylvanian Saxons. The flag and coat of arms of Transylvania were granted by Queen Maria Theresa in 1765, when she established a Grand Principality within the Habsburg monarchy.

In 1596, Levinus Hulsius created a coat of arms for Transylvania, consisting of a shield with a rising eagle in the upper field and seven hills with towers on top in the lower field. He published it in his work "Chronologia", issued in Nuremberg the same year. The seal from 1597 of Sigismund Báthory, Prince of Transylvania, reproduced the new coat of arms with some slight changes: in the upper field the eagle was flanked by a sun and a moon and in the lower field the hills were replaced by simple towers. The coat of arms of Sigismund Báthory beside the coat of arms of the Báthory family, included the Transylvanian, Wallachia and Moldavian coat of arms, he used the title Prince of Transylvania, Wallachia and Moldavia. A short-lived heraldic representation of Transylvania is found on the seal of Michael the Brave. Besides the Wallachian eagle and the Moldavian aurochs, Transylvania is represented by two lions holding a sword standing on seven hills. Hungarian Transylvanian princes used the symbols of the Transylvanian coat of arms usually with the Hungarian coat of arms since the 16th century because Transylvanian princes maintained their claims to the throne of the Kingdom of Hungary.

While neither symbol has official status in present-day Romania, the Transylvanian coat of arms is marshalled within the national Coat of arms of Romania, it was also a component of the Coat of arms of Hungary.

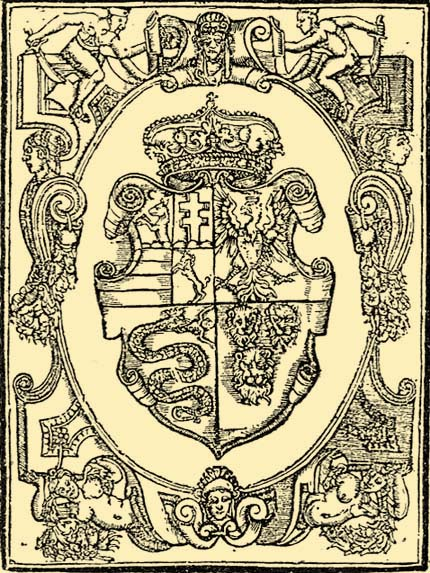
Coat of arms of John Sigismund Zápolya, King of Hungary (1540–1551) and Prince of Transylvania (1570-1571)

Coat of arms of Transylvania by Levinus Hulsius (1596)

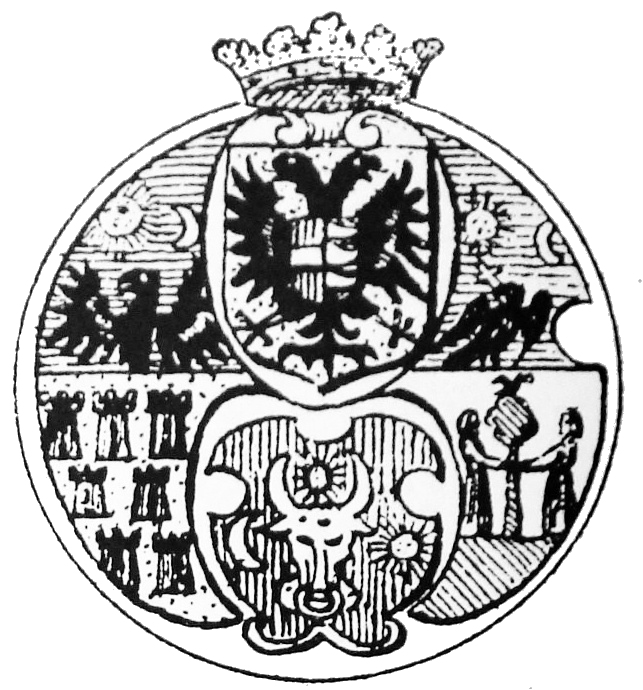
Coat of arm of Sigismund Báthory, Prince of Transylvania (1586–1598, 1598–1599, 1601–1602)

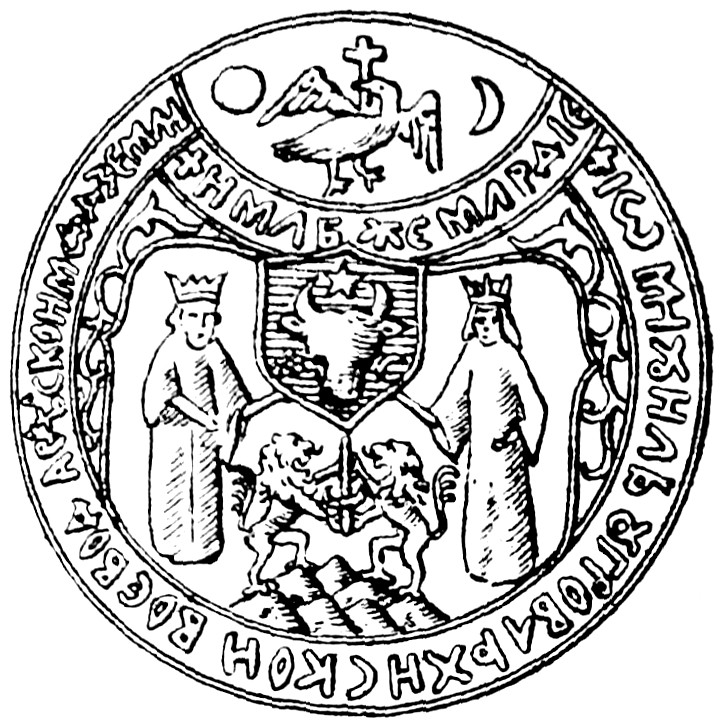
Seal of Michael the Brave during his personal union of Wallachia, Moldavia and Transylvania (1599–1600)

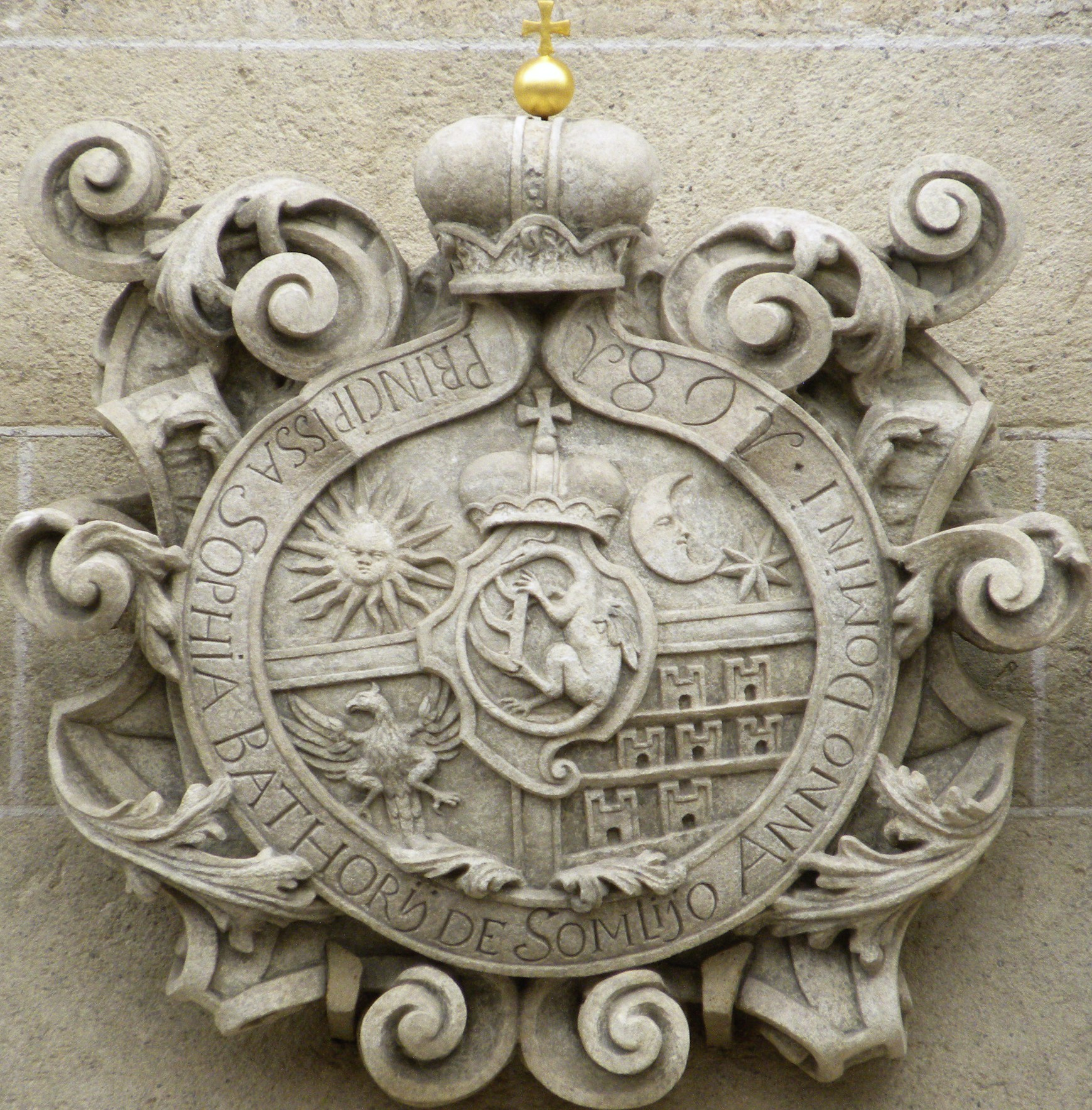
Coat of arms of Sophia Báthory, Princess of Transylvania (1642–1657, 1657–1658, 1659–1660)

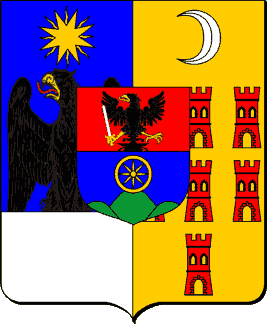
Coat of arms of George I Rákóczi, Prince of Transylvania (1630-1648)

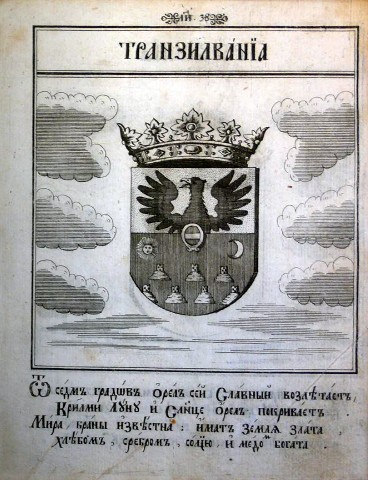
Coat of arms of Transylvania by Hristofor Žefarović (1741)

Coat of arms of Transylvania by Hugo Gerard Ströhl

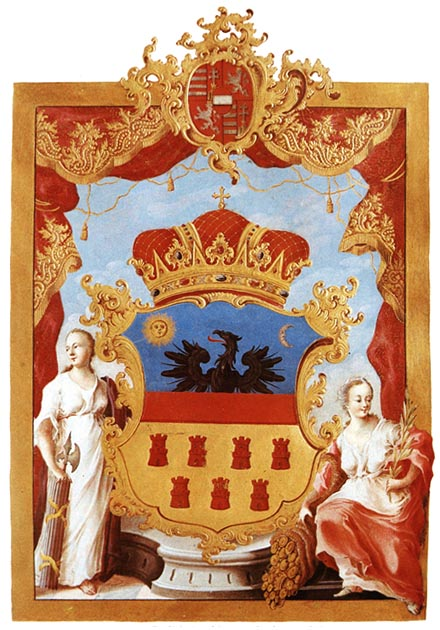
Coat of arms of Transylvania (1765)

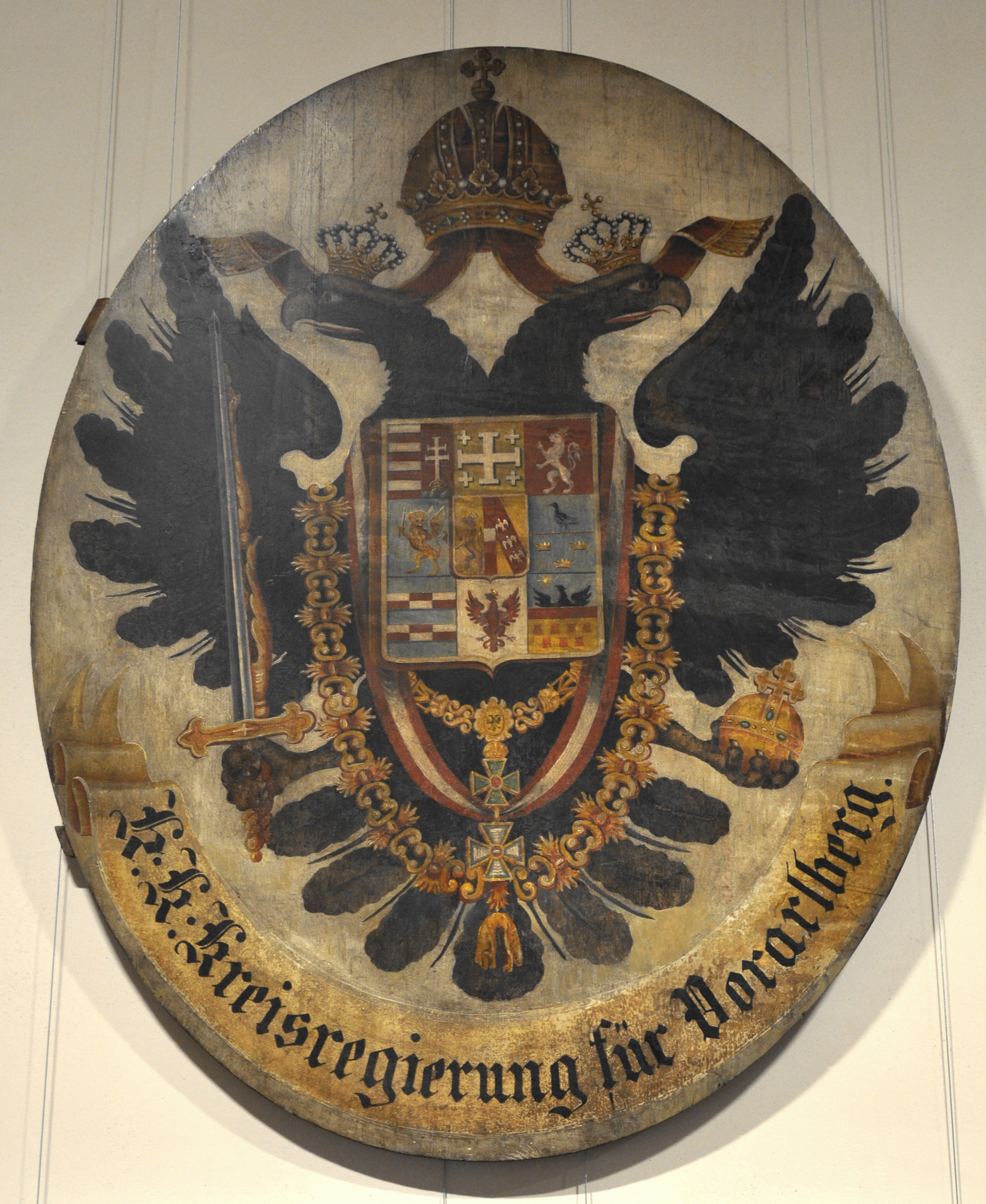
Coat of arms of Transylvania in an Austrian coat of arms (1850)

Coat of arms of Transylvania in the coat of arms of the Kingdom of Hungary (1867–1915)

Coat of arms of Transylvania in the coat of arms of the Kingdom of Hungary (1867–1915)

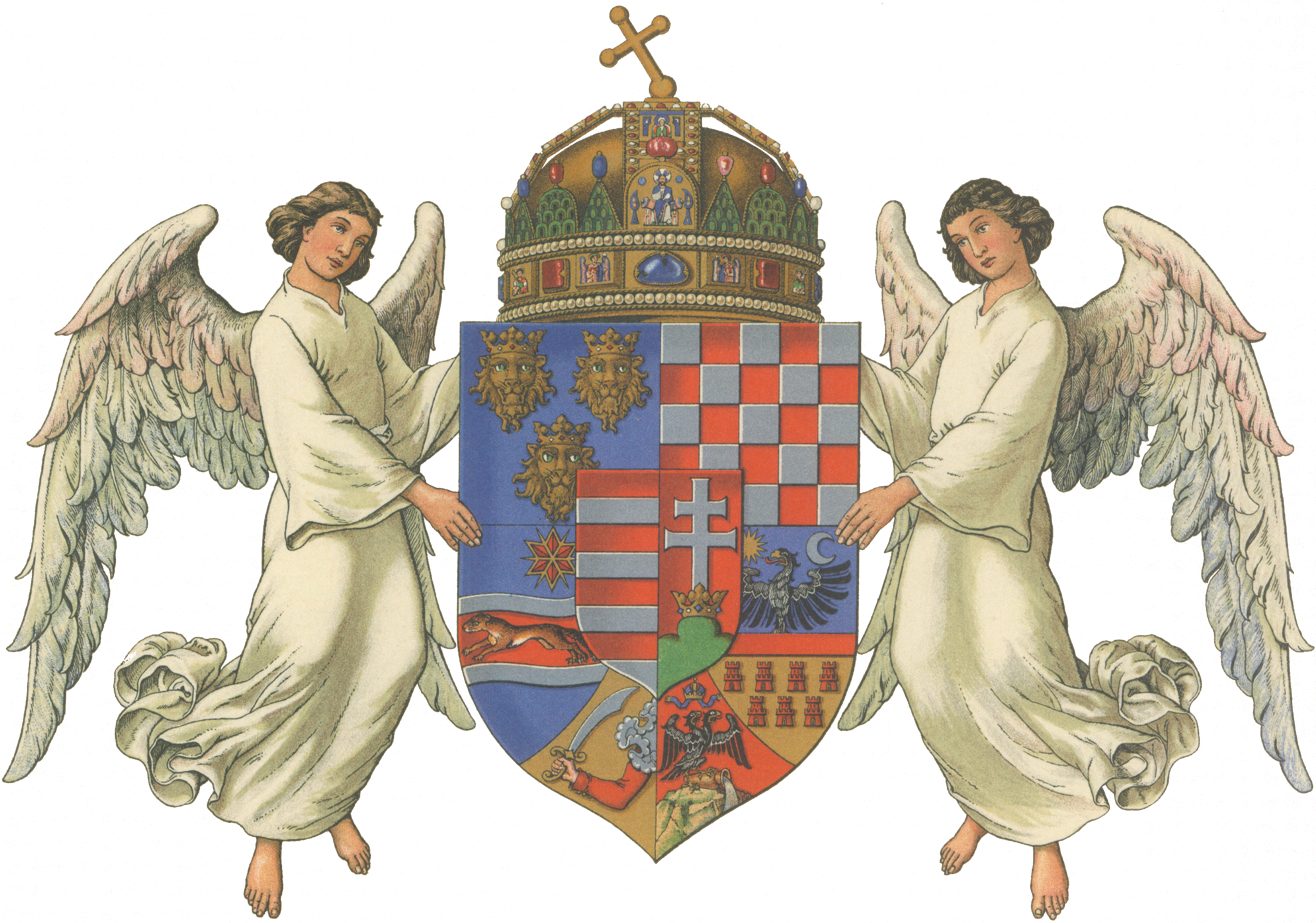
Coat of arms of Transylvania in the coat of arms of the Kingdom of Hungary (1915–1918)

Coat of arms of Transylvania in the coat of arms of the Kingdom of Romania (1921–1947)

Coat of arms of Transylvania in the coat of arms of Romania (2016)

== See also ==
- Prehistory of Transylvania
- The Ancient History of Transylvania
- History of Romania
- History of Cluj-Napoca
- History of Hungary
- Kingdom of Hungary in the Middle Ages
- List of Transylvanian rulers
- History of the Székely people
- Aftermath of World War I
- Austria-Hungary
- Celts in Transylvania
- Dacia
- Origin of the Romanians
- Transylvanian School
- ASTRA
- Avram Iancu

== Sources ==
- Molnár, Miklós (2001). A Concise History of Hungary. Cambridge University Press. ISBN 0 521 66142 0.
