= List of princes of Transylvania =

This is a list of the princes of Transylvania.

== List of princes ==
=== Sixteenth century ===
| Reign | Portrait | Prince | Birth | Marriage | Death | Notes | Source |
|---|---|---|---|---|---|---|---|
| 1570–1571 | John Sigismund Zápolya | John Sigismund Zápolya | 7 July 1540; Buda son of John I of Hungary and Isabella of Poland | died unmarried | 14 March 1571; Gyulafehérvár | former elected king of Hungary (1540–1551, 1559–1570) | |
| 1576–1586 | Stephen Báthory | Stephen Báthory | 27 Sept 1533; Szilágysomlyó son of Stephen (VIII) Báthory and Catherine Telegdi | Anna of Poland (1576) childless | 12 December 1586; Grodno | former voivode of Transylvania (1571–1576); also king of Poland (1576–1586) | |
| 1586–1598 | Sigismund Báthory | Sigismund Báthory | 1572; Várad son of Christopher Báthory and Erzsébet Bocskai | Maria Christina of Austria (1595) childless | 27 March 1613 | first reign; Prince Stephen Báthory's nephew; former voivode of Transylvania (1581–1586); abdicated for the duchies of Opole and Ratibor | |
| 1598 | Transylvania is administered by imperial commissioners in the name of Rudolf II, Holy Roman Emperor | | | | | | |
| 1598–1599 | Sigismund Báthory | Sigismund Báthory | 1572; Várad son of Christopher Báthory and Erzsébet Bocskai | Maria Christina of Austria (1595) childless | 27 March 1613 | second reign; abdicated in favor of his cousin, Andrew Báthory | |
| 1599 | Andrew Báthory | Andrew Báthory | 1566; Szilágysomlyó son of Andrew Báthory and Margit Majláth | unmarried | 3 November 1599; Csikszentdomokos (Sândominic) | nephew of Prince Stephen Báthory, cousin of Prince Sigismund Báthory; former Cardinal; killed by Székelys after his defeat by Voivode Michael the Brave of Wallachia in the battle of Sellenberk | |
| 1599–1600 | Transylvania is administered by Voivode Michael the Brave of Wallachia, recognized by the Diet as imperial governor of Emperor Rudolf II, Holy Roman Emperor. In addition, Michael the Brave occupied Moldavia in 1600, and styled himself "By the grace of God, ruler of Wallachia, Transylvania and Moldavia" between 6 June 1600 and December 1600. In his correspondence with Emperor Rudolf II, he always styled himself locum tenens of the emperor. | | | | | | |

=== Seventeenth century ===
| Reign | Portrait | Prince | Birth | Marriage | Death | Notes | Source |
|---|---|---|---|---|---|---|---|
| 1600–1601 | Transylvania is administered by General Giorgio Basta in the name of Rudolf II, Holy Roman Emperor | | | | | | |
| 1601–1602 | Sigismund Báthory | Sigismund Báthory | 1572; Várad (Oradea) son of Christopher Báthory and Erzsébet Bocskai | Maria Christina of Austria (1595) childless | 27 March 1613 | third reign; fled abroad following his defeat by General Giorgio Basta and Michael the Brave in the battle of Goroszló, but before long he returned abdicated | |
| 1601–1603 | Transylvania (or parts of Transylvania) is administered by General Giorgio Basta in the name of Rudolf II, Holy Roman Emperor | | | | | | |
| 1603 | Mózes Székely | Moses Székely | c. 1553; Lövéte (Lueta) son of János Székely | unknown (1st marriage); Anna Kornis (2nd marriage) (c. 1585); 1 child | 17 July 1603 by Brassó | Backed by the Ottoman governor of the vilajet of Temesvár defeats Giorgio Basta; having received the ahidnâme from Sultan Mehmed III, declared prince by a "Diet at military camp" killed in the battle of Brassó fighting against Voivode Radu Şerban of Wallachia and his Székely allies | |
| July 1603–September 1603 | Transylvania was ruled by Radu Şerban of Wallachia who held the title of voivode | | | | | | |
| September 1603–1604 | Transylvania is administered by General Giorgio Basta in the name of Rudolf II, Holy Roman Emperor | | | | | | |
| 1605–1606 | Stephen Bocskai | Stephen Bocskai | 1 January 1557; Kolozsvár (Cluj-Napoca) son of George Bocskai and Krisztina Sulyok | Kata Hagymássy (1583) childless | 29 December 1606; Kassa | maternal uncle of Prince Sigismund Báthory; elected prince of Hungary (1605–1606) | |
| 1607–1608 | Sigismund Rákóczi | Sigismund Rákóczi | 1544; Felsővadász son of János Rákócsi and Sára Némethy | Judit Bekény (1st marriage) (1587); 1 child Anna Gerendi (2nd marriage) (1592); 3 children Borbála Telegdy (3rd marriage) (1596) childless | 5 December 1608; Felsővadász | baron (1588); abdicated in favor of Gabriel Báthory father of George I Rákóczi | |
| 1608–1613 | Gabriel Báthory | Gabriel Báthory | 15 August 1589; Várad (Oradea) son of Stephen Báthory and Zsuzsanna Bebek | Anna Palocsai-Horváth (1607) childless | 27 October 1613; Várad (Oradea) | his father is a nephew of Prince Stephen Báthory, himself is Prince Andrew Báthory's nephew; also voivode of Wallachia (1611); expelled by Ottoman troops assisting Gabriel Bethlen; murdered by Hajdu assassins | |
| 1613–1629 | Gabriel Bethlen | Gabriel Bethlen | 15 November 1580; Marosillye son of Farkas Bethlen and Druzsina Lázár de Szárhegy | Zsuzsanna Károlyi (1st marriage) (1605); 3 children (all died); Catherine of Brandenburg (1626) childless | 15 November 1629; Gyulafehérvár | elected by Ottoman assistance; also elected king of Hungary (1620–1621); according to the Peace of Nikolsburg of 1621 also duke of Opole and Ratibor in Silesia (1621–1629); according to the same peace, 7 counties (Abaúj, Bereg, Borsod, Szabolcs, Szatmár, Ugocsa, and Zemplén) are joined to the principality for his lifetime | |
| 1629–1630 | Catherine of Brandenburg | Catherine of Brandenburg | 28 May 1604; Brandenburg an der Havel daughter of John Sigismund, Elector of Brandenburg and Anna of Prussia | Gabriel Bethlen (1st marriage) (1626) childless Francis Charles of Saxe-Lauenburg (1639) | 27 August 1649; Schöningen | Prince Gabriel Bethlen's widow; her right to success his husband confirmed in his life (1626) by the Diet; usually referred to as "prince" instead of "princess"; abdicated | |
| 1630 | Stephen Bethlen | Stephen Bethlen | 1584 son of Farkas Bethlen and Druzsina Lázár de Szárhegy | Krisztina Csáky (1st marriage); 3 children Katalin Károlyi; 3 children | 10 January 1648; Ecsed | Prince Gabriel Bethlen's brother; elected by the Diet, but later opposed by George I Rákóczi | |
| 1630–1648 | George I Rákóczi | George I Rákóczi | 8 June 1593; Szerencs son of Sigismund Rákóczi and Anna Gerendi | Zsuzsanna Lorántffy (1616); 4 children | 11 October 1648; Gyulafehérvár | Prince Sigismund Rákóczi's son | |
| 1648–1657 | George II Rákóczi | George II Rákóczi | 30 January 1621; Sárospatak son of George I Rákóczi and Zsuzsanna Lorántffy | Sophia Báthory (1643); 2 children | 7 June 1660; Várad (Oradea) | first reign; Prince George I Rákóczi's son; elected prince by the Diet in his father's life (1642) in recognition of his right to succession; deposed by the Ottoman Grand Vizier Mehmed Köprülü | |
| (not installed) | Francis I Rákóczi | Francis I Rákóczi | 24 February 1645; Gyulafehérvár son of George II Rákóczi and Sophia Báthory | Countess Ilona Zrínyi (1666); 4 children | 8 July 1676; Zboró | elected prince by the Diet in his father's life (1652) in recognition of his right to succession; never installed because of his father's fall | |
| 1657–1658 | Francis Rhédey | Francis Rhédey | 1610; Várad (Oradea) son of Francis Rhédey and Kata Károlyi | Druzsina Bethlen de Bethlen; 1 child | 7 May 1667; Huszt | elected prince by the Diet against George II Rákóczi on the order of the Sublime Porte | |
| 1658 | George II Rákóczi | George II Rákóczi | 30 January 1621; Sárospatak son of George I Rákóczi and Zsuzsanna Lorántffy | Sophia Báthory (1643); 2 children | 7 June 1660; Várad (Oradea) | second reign; elected again prince by the Diet; expelled by Ottoman troops | |
| 1658–1659 | Ákos Barcsay | Ákos Barcsay | c. 1610 son of Sándor Barcsay and Erzse Palatics | Erzsébet Szalánczy (1st marriage) childless Izabella Bánffy (1660) childless | July 1661; Kozmatelke | first reign; appointed by the Sublime Porte, then elected by the Diet against George II Rákóczi; while visiting the Ottoman governor of the vilajet of Temesvár, his opponent returned to the principality | |
| 1659–1660 | George II Rákóczi | George II Rákóczi | 30 January 1621; Sárospatak son of George I Rákóczi and Zsuzsanna Lorántffy | Sophia Báthory (1643); 2 children | 7 June 1660; Várad (Oradea) | third reign; elected again prince by the Diet; defeated in a battle at Szászfenes | |
| 1660 | Ákos Barcsay | Ákos Barcsay | c. 1610 son of Sándor Barcsay and Erzse Palatics | Erzsébet Szalánczy (1st marriage) childless Izabella Bánffy (1660) childless | July 1661; Kozmatelke | second reign; reinstalled by the Sublime Porte; abdicated | |
| 1661–1662 | John Kemény | John Kemény | 14 December 1607; Magyarbükkös son of Balthasar Kemény and Zsófia Tornyi | Zsuzsa Kállai (1st marriage) (1632); 1 child Anna Lónyay (1659); 1 child | 22 January 1662; Nagyszőllős (Seleuș) | | |
| 1661–1690 | Michael I Apafi | Michael I Apafi | 3 November 1632; Ebesfalva son of George Apafi and Borbála Petki | Anna Bornemissza; 9 children | 15 April 1690; Fogaras | | |
| 1690–1696 or 1701 | Michael II Apafi | Michael II Apafi | 13 October 1676; Gyulafehérvár son of Michael I Apafi and Anna Bornemissza | Countess Kata Bethlen (1694) childless | 1 February 1713; Vienna | Prince Michael I Apafi's son; elected prince by the Diet in his father's life (1681) in recognition of his right to succession; never installed, since he was taken in 1696 by force to Vienna because of his marriage without the previous approval of Leopold I, Holy Roman Emperor; abdicated of his title in 1701 | |
| 1690 | Emeric Thököly | Emeric Thököly | 25 September 1657; Késmárk son of Count Stephen Thököly and Mária Gyulaffi | Countess Ilona Zrínyi (1683); 2 children | 13 February 1705; İzmit | Declared vassal king of Upper Hungary by Sultan Mehmed IV, never elected and crowned. | |

=== Eighteenth century ===
| Reign | Portrait | Prince | Birth | Marriage | Death | Notes | Source |
|---|---|---|---|---|---|---|---|
| 1704–1711 | Francis II Rákóczi | Francis II Rákóczi | 27 March 1676; Borsi son of Francis I Rákóczi and Countess Ilona Zrínyi | Charlotte Amalie of Hessen-Rheinfels-Wanfried (1694); 4 children | 8 April 1735; Tekirdağ | Prince Francis I Rákóczi's son | |

== See also ==
- List of rulers of Transylvania
- List of consorts of Transylvania
