= List of princesses consort of Transylvania =

This is a list of princesses consort of the Principality of Transylvania (1570–1711). In this era, Transylvania was a vassal state of the Ottoman Empire, sometimes in dual vassalage with the Lands of the Hungarian Crown.

== Princess consort of Transylvania ==
Báthory dynasty Habsburg dynasty Rákóczi dynasty Bethlen dynasty Apafi dynasty Habsburg-Lorraine dynasty

Picture	Name	Father	Birth	Marriage	Became Princess	Ceased to be Princess	Death	Spouse
	Anna Szárkándy	-	-	-	1571 husband's opposes Stephen Báthory	1572 husband's defeat	-	Gáspár Bekes
	Anna Jagiellon	Sigismund I the Old (Jagiellon)	18 October 1523	1 May 1576 alongside Elisabeth Bocskay		12 December 1586 husband's death	9 September 1596	Stephen Báthory
	Elisabeth Bocskay	György Bocskay (Bocskay)	1550	1571?	28 January 1576 alongside Anna Jagiellon	27 May 1581 husband's death	15 February 1581	Christopher Báthory
	Maria Christina of Austria	Charles II, Archduke of Austria (Habsburg)	10 November 1574	6 August 1595		April 1598 husband's abdication	6 April 1621	Sigismund Báthory
Unmarried								Rudolf I of Hungary
	Maria Christina of Austria	Charles II, Archduke of Austria (Habsburg)	10 November 1574	6 August 1595	August 1598 husband's return	1599 divorce or March 1599 husband's 2nd abdication	6 April 1621	Sigismund Báthory
	Stanca Doamna	Dimitru Izverani?	-	1588	20 November 1599 husband's accession	September 1600 husband's desposition	-	Michael of Wallachia
Unmarried								Rudolf I of Hungary
Unmarried								Sigismund Báthory
Unmarried								Rudolf I of Hungary
	Anna Kornis	-	-	1585	15 April 1603 husband's election	17 July 1603 husband's death	-	Mózes Székely
	Katalin Hagymássy	-	-	1583	21 February 1605 husband's election	29 December 1606 husband's death	-	Stephen Bocskay
	Borbála Telegdi	Mihály Telegdi (Telegdi)	-	1596	11 February 1607 husband's election	5 March 1608 husband's resignation	March 1616	Sigismund Rákóczi
	Anna Horváth of Palocsa	-	-	1607	7 March 1608 husband's election	27 October 1613 husband's death	-	Gabriel Báthory
	Zsuzsanna Károlyi	László Károlyi (Károlyi de Nagykároly)	1585	1605	13 October 1613 husband's election	13 May 1622		Gabriel Bethlen
	Catherine of Brandenburg	John Sigismund, Elector of Brandenburg (Hohenzollern)	28 May 1602	2 March 1626		15 November 1629 husband's death	9 February 1649	Gabriel Bethlen
	Katalin Károlyi	László Károlyi (Károlyi de Nagykároly)	1588	1623	28 September 1629 husband's election	26 November 1630 husband's desposition	1588	István Bethlen
	Maria Anna of Spain	Philip III of Spain (Habsburg)	18 August 1606	20 February 1631 in opposition with Zsuzsanna Lorántffy		13 December 1645 husband's recognition of George I Rákóczi as Prince	13 May 1646	Ferdinand III of Hungary
	Zsuzsanna Lorántffy	Mihály Lorántffy (Lorántffy de Serke)	1600/2	1616	1 December 1630 husband's election	11 October 1648 husband's death	18 April 1660	George I Rákóczi
	Zsófia Báthory	Andrew Báthory (1597–1637) (Báthory de Somlyó)	1629	3 February 1643	19 February 1642 husband's election October 1648 husband's accession	3 November 1657 husband's death	14 June 1680	George II Rákóczi
	Druzsina Bethlen	István Bethlen (Bethlen de Iktár)	-	-	2 November 1657 husband's election	9 January 1658 husband's death	-	Francis Rhédey
	Zsófia Báthory	Andrew Báthory (1597–1637) (Báthory de Somlyó)	1629	3 February 1643	1657 husband's desposition	1658 husband's restoration	14 June 1680	George II Rákóczi
	Erzsébet Szalánczy	- (Szalánczy de Szenttamás)	-	-	1658 husband's desposition	1659 husband's restoration	-	Ákos Barcsay
	Zsófia Báthory	Andrew Báthory (1597–1637) (Báthory de Somlyó)	1629	3 February 1643	1659 husband's restoration	7 June 1660 husband's death	14 June 1680	George II Rákóczi
	Anna Bornemissza	-	1630	1650 or 10 June 1653	14 September 1661 husband's election	5 August 1688		Michael I Apafi
	Katalin Bethlen	Gergely Bethlen (Bethlen de Bethlen)	-	30 June 1694		1692 husband's desposition	4 January 1725	Michael II Apafi
	Jelena Zrinska	Petar Zrinski, Ban of Croatia (Zrinski)	1643	15 June 1682	22 September 1690 husband's opposition of Habsburg rule	26 January 1699 husband's claim relinquished with the defeat of Ottoman allies	18 February 1703	Imre Thököly
	Eleonore-Magdalena of the Palatinate-Neuburg	Philip William, Elector Palatine (Wittelsbach)	6 January 1655	14 December 1676	1692 husband's assumed title	5 May 1705 husband's death	19 January 1720	Leopold I of Hungary
	Charlotte Amalie of Hesse-Wanfried	Charles, Landgrave of Hesse-Wanfried (Hesse-Wanfried)	8 March 1679	26 September 1696	8 July 1704; Start of Rákóczi's War for Independence	21 February 1711; End of Rákóczi's War for Independence	8 February 1722	Francis II Rákóczi
	Wilhelmina Amalia of Brunswick	John Frederick, Duke of Brunswick-Lüneburg (Welf)	21 April 1673	24 February 1699	5 May 1705 husband's accession	17 April 1711 husband's death	10 April 1742	Joseph I of Hungary

During the (Grand) Principality of Transylvania (1711–1867), the title of "Prince(ss) of Transylvania" (since 2 November 1765 "Grand Prince(ss)") was connected to the Habsburg kings and queens of Hungary (see List of Hungarian monarchs § House of Habsburg (1526–1780) and List of Hungarian monarchs § House of Habsburg-Lorraine (1780–1918)) until 1804, when it was added to the Grand title of the emperor of Austria. In practice, administration was performed by the Governor of Transylvania, a viceroy appointed by the Habsburg monarchs between 1691 and 1867.

== See also ==
- Lists of political office-holders in Transylvania
  - Governor of Transylvania
  - Prince of Transylvania
- List of Hungarian consorts
- List of Polish consorts
- List of Austrian consorts
- List of Romanian consorts
- List of consorts of Wallachia
- List of consorts of Moldavia
