= Francis Rhédey =

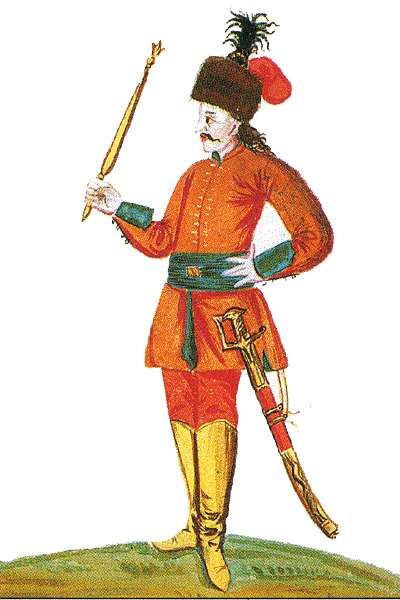

Prince of Transylvania
- Reign: 2 November 1657 – 9 January 1658
- Predecessor: George II Rákóczi
- Successor: George II Rákóczi
- Born: c. 1610; Nagyvárad, Principality of Transylvania (now Oradea, Romania)
- Died: 13 May 1667; Huszt, Royal Hungary (now Khust, Ukraine)
- House: Szani-Rhédey csalad

Count Francis Rhédey de Kis-Rhéde (c. 1610 – 13 May 1667) was a Hungarian noble, who reigned as Prince of Transylvania between November 1657 and January 1658.

== Biography ==
He was born as the son of Count Francis Rhédey de Kis-Rhéde (1560-1621) and his wife, Katalin Karolyi (1588-1635), widow of István Bánffy de Losonc and future wife of Stefan Bethlen de Iktár, Prince of Transylvania. As a high-ranking nobleman he served in the Transylvanian army for several years as deputy commander in the service of Prince George II Rákóczi.

Francis Rhédey was elected Prince of Transylvania for a brief time while George Rákóczi was on a military campaign in Poland. Upset because Rákóczi had not requested authorization from the sultan to start the military campaign, the Grand Vizier Köprülü Mehmed Pasha, forced the Grand Assembly to elect Francis Rhédey as prince of Transylvania instead of Rákóczi. Soon Rhédey was officially elected as Transylvanian Prince on 2 November 1657, but on 9 January 1658 he resigned in favor of George Rákóczi II, who had returned to Transylvania.

Rhédey later was a member of the Great Council during the government of Prince Michael I Apafi. He died on 13 May 1667.

== Personal life ==
He was married to Druzsiána Bethlen de Iktár, daughter of his stepfather, Prince Stefan, by his first wife, Katalin Csáki de Mihály. They had one son, Count László Rhédey de Kis-Rhéde (1636-1663).

Regnal titles
Preceded by George II Rákóczi	Prince of Transylvania; 1657–1658	Succeeded by George II Rákóczi

== See also ==
- Countess Claudine Rhédey de Kis-Rhéde – relative
