= Káldy =

Káldy is a Hungarian surname. Notable people with the surname include:

- György Káldy (1573–1634), Hungarian Jesuit and Bible translator
- Zoltán Káldy (born 1969), Hungarian long-distance runner
