= János Gerendi =

János Gerendi (died after 28 August 1594) was a Transylvanian politician who supported radical theological views. He "was in contact with nearly all the prominent representatives of the radical Antitrinitarians" after 1570. His followers, who regarded Saturday as the day of rest, but did not obey all the Old Testament laws, were known as "Gerendists". He accepted atheist philosophy from the late 1580s.

== Political career ==
János Gerendi was the scion of a Hungarian noble family. His family estates were located in the Principality of Transylvania. He studied at the University of Padua from 1575. He was made a judge at the princely court in 1585. He was one of the representatives of the Three Nations of Transylvania at the Diet in Medgyes in 1588. He urged the monarch, Sigismund Báthory, to expel the Jesuits from the principality. Báthory who regarded Gerendi as one of the principal leaders of the opposition ordered his arrest at Kolozsvár (Cluj-Napoca, Romania) on 28 August 1594. He was sentenced to death, but his son-in-law, Sigismund Rákóczi, achieved an amnesty. No information of Gerendi's later life was recorded, suggesting that he did not long survive his imprisonment.

== Radical reformer ==
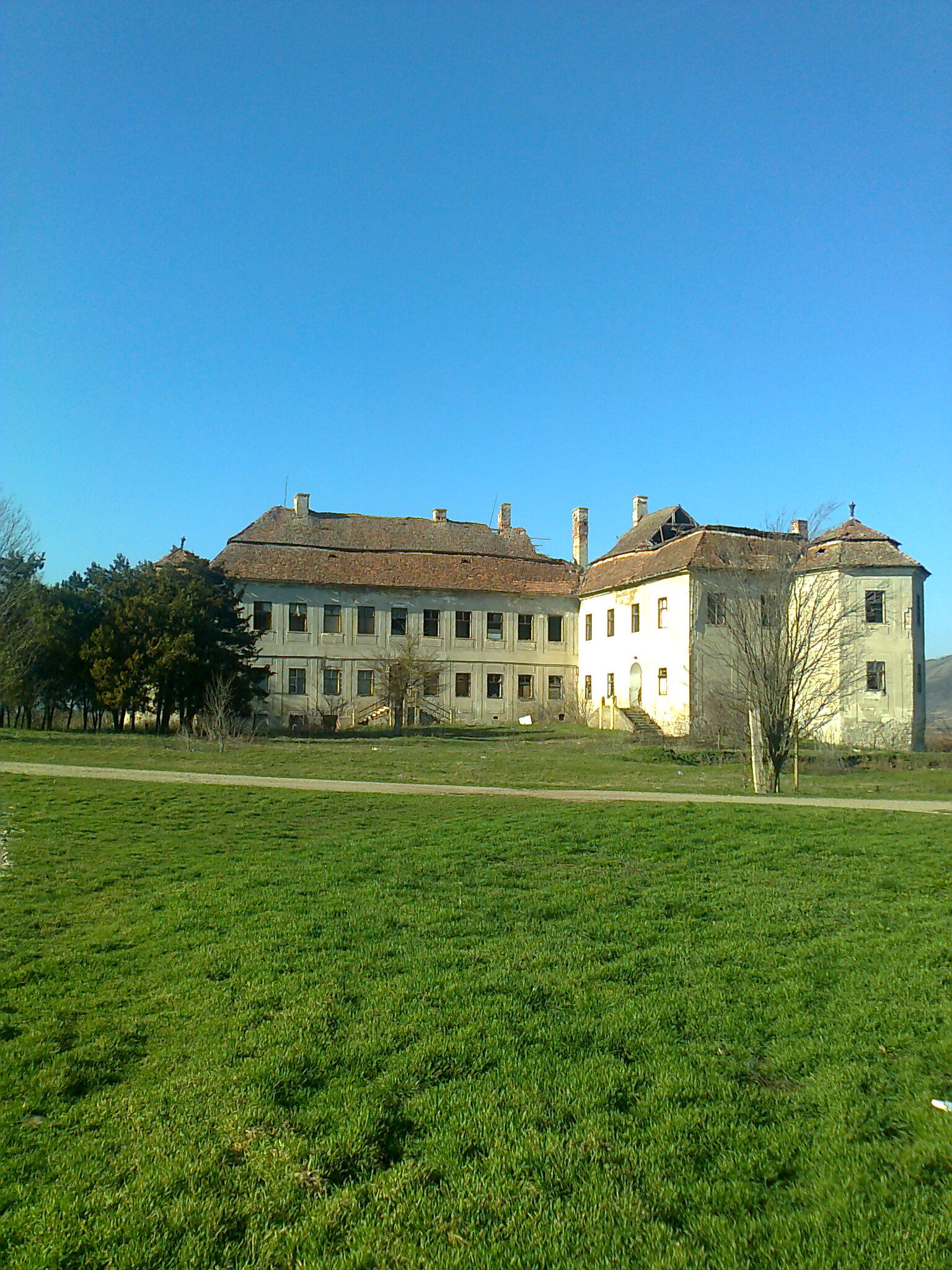
Manor house at Gerend

Gerendi held manor houses at Gerend and Alcina (now Luncani and Alțâna in Romania), where he granted asylum to the most radical theologians of his age. Johann Sommer dedicated one of his books to him in 1571. Jacob Palaeologus, who denied the deity of Jesus, was staying in Alcina from late 1574 to the summer of 1575. The Sabbatarian theologian, Miklós Bogáti Fazekas, often visited him at Gerend in the early 1580s. He persuaded Gerendi to declare Saturday as the day of rest in his estates and to introduce some Old-Testament rules relating to diet (the ban on eating blood and animals that had been strangled). Incited by Lutheran priests, peasants from Kerc (now Cârța in Romania) murdered Gerendi's nephew who promoted the work on Sundays in 1585.

Although a Jesuit friar, István Szántó, credited him with the introduction of Sabbatarianism in Transylvania, Gerendi actually did not obey all the Old Testament laws. His followers were known as "Gerendists" in Transylvania around 1600. The leading Unitarian theologian, Giorgio Biandrata, achieved an investigation at Gerendi's estates, which forced Bogáti Fazekas to flee from the principality in 1582. The freethinker Christian Francken who visited him for the first time in Alcina in 1584 convinced Gerendi that obedience to Old Testament laws is unnecessary. Under Francken's influence, Gerendi accepted his philosophical atheism during the last years of his life.

== Family ==
Gerendi's first wife, Kata Erdélyi of Somkerék, was closely related to prominent Transylvanian families. After her death, Gerendi married Magdolna Rákóczi whose brother, Sigismund, held large domains in Royal Hungary. Rákóczi married Gerendi's daughter by his first wife, Anna, in 1582. Rákóczi was elected prince of Transylvania in 1607.

== Sources ==
- Hangay, Zoltán (1987). Erdély választott fejedelme: Rákóczi Zsigmond [Elected Prince of Transylvania: Sigismund Rákóczi]. Zrínyi Kiadó. ISBN 963-326-363-8.
- Keul, István (2009). Early Modern Religious Communities in East-Central Europe: Ethnic Diversity, Denominational Plurality, and Corporative Politics in the Principality of Transylvania (1526–1691). Brill. ISBN 978-90-04-17652-2.
- Pirnát, Antal (1970). "Gerendi János és Eössi András [János Gerendi and András Eössi]" (PDF). Irodalomtörténeti Közlemények (in Hungarian). 74 (5–6): 680–684. ISSN 0021-1486.
- Szabó, Géza (1982). "A Hungarian antitrinitarian poet and theologian: Miklós Bogáti Fazakas". In Dán, Róbert; Pirnát, Antal (eds.). Antitrinitarianism in the Second Half of the 16th Century. Akadémiai Kiadó. pp. 215–230. ISBN 963-05-2852-5.
