= George I Rákóczi =

Hungarian prince of Transylvania

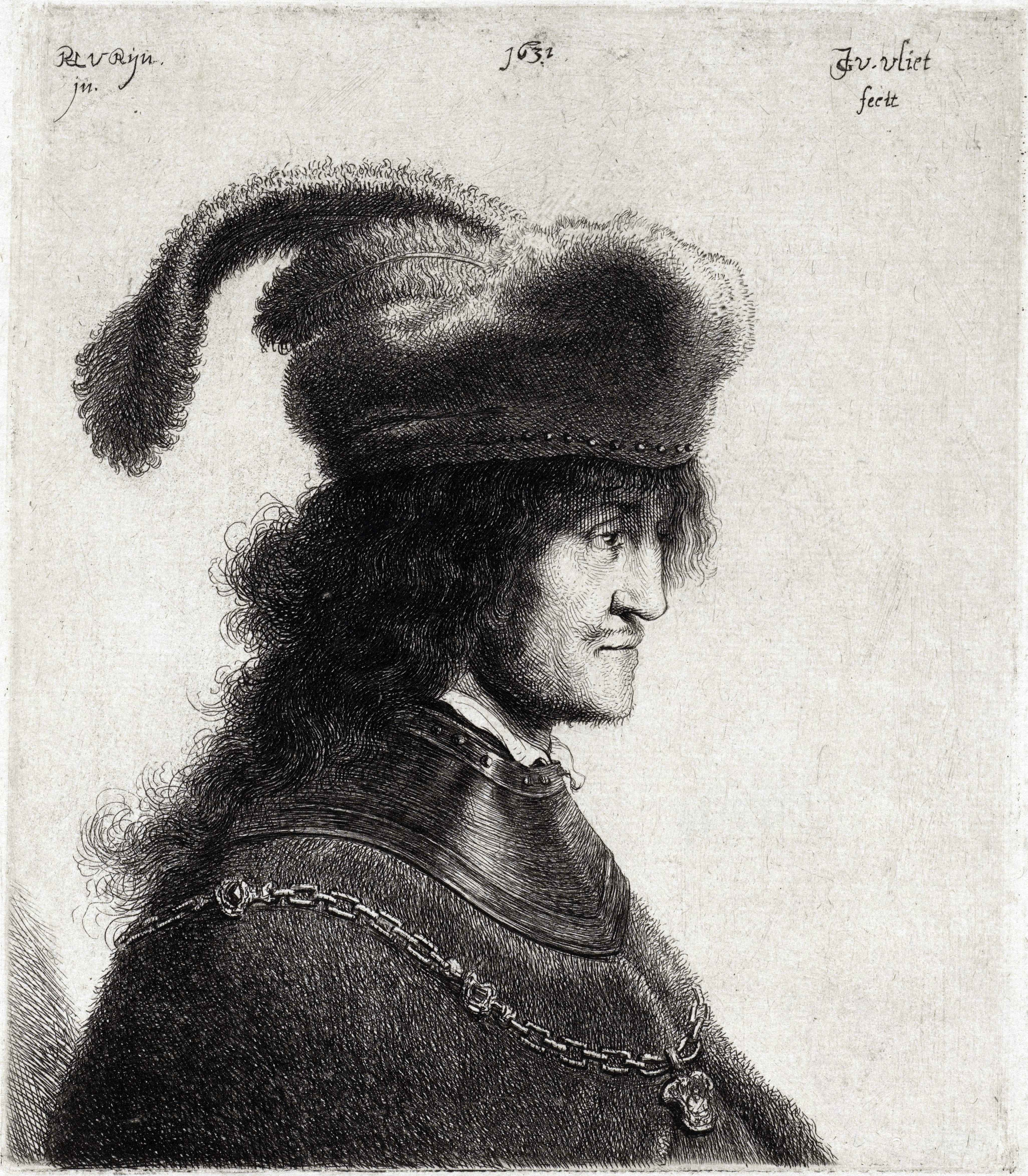
- Portrait by Rembrandt van Rijn and Jan Gillisz van Vliet

Prince of Transylvania
- Reign: 1630–1648
- Predecessor: Stephen Bethlen
- Successor: George II Rákóczi
- Born: 8 June 1593; Szerencs, Hungary
- Died: 11 October 1648 (aged 55); Gyulafehérvár, Transylvania
- Spouse: Zsuzsanna Lórántffy
- Issue: George II Rákóczi; Sigismund Rákóczi
- House: Rákóczi
- Father: Sigismund Rákóczi
- Mother: Anna Gerendi
- Religion: Calvinism

George I Rákóczi (8 June 1593 – 11 October 1648) was Prince of Transylvania from 1630 until his death in 1648. Prior to that, he was a leader of the Protestant faction in Hungary and a faithful supporter of Gabriel Bethlen, his predecessor as Prince. When Bohemian nobles requested military support in their struggles against the Habsburg monarchy, Rákóczi persuaded Bethlen to help and commanded Transylvanian forces in several battles. Rákóczi was elected prince after Bethlen's death, after short reigns by Bethlen's wife Catherine of Brandenburg (reigned 1629–1630) and brother Stephen Bethlen (reigned September – December 1630).

Rákóczi's reign was notable for his involvement in the Thirty Years War, with a 1644–45 campaign against Ferdinand III, Holy Roman Emperor. After Rákóczi held Upper Hungary and most of Lower Hungary at one point, the fighting was ended by the Treaty of Linz, under which seven counties of Upper Hungary – Abaúj, Bereg, Borsod, Szabolcs, Szatmár, Ugocsa and Zemplén were annexed by Transylvania. Five of these were handed back to the Habsburg monarchy after Rákóczi's death with Szabolcs and Szatmár remaining Transylvanian.

== Early life ==
George was the eldest son of Baron Sigismund Rákóczi and his second wife, Anna Gerendi. Sigismund, who was a successful military commander in Royal Hungary, was the first member of the Rákóczi family to rise to prominence. George was born in Szerencs on 8 June 1593. His mother died in 1595.

George's childhood is almost undocumented. His father sent him to Kassa (now Košice in Slovakia) in late 1604 or early 1605. Kassa was the seat of Stephen Bocskai, who had rebelled against the Habsburg ruler of Royal Hungary, Rudolph. Through sending George to Kassa, Sigismund demonstrated his support to Bocskai who made him the governor of the Principality of Transylvania in September 1605.

Bocskai named Bálint Drugeth as his successor in Transylvania on his deathbed, but the Diet of Transylvania elected Sigismund prince on 12 February 1606. After his election, Sigismund first drank George's health. Gabriel Báthory, who laid claim to Transylvania, made an alliance with the irregular Hajdú troops. Sigismund was forced to abdicate in Báthory's favor on 5 March 1608. Although Sigismund lost the throne, his short reign in Transylvania strengthened his sons' position, because no other noblemen could demonstrate a princely origin. George went to Pressburg (now Bratislava in Slovakia) to represent his ailing father at the Diet of Hungary in September 1608. He was still at the Diet when his father died on 5 December.

== Wealthy nobleman ==
George and his two brothers, Zsigmond and Pál, inherited their father's vast estates in Royal Hungary. Bálint Drugeth (who was the husband of their eldest sister), their father's widow, Borbála Telegdy, and her son-in-law, István Kendi, sued them for parts of their inheritance. To secure the support of the monarch, George went to the royal court at Prague in spring 1611. He also cooperated with György Thurzó, Palatine of Hungary, against the Hajdús.

George was made the ispán (or head) of Borsod County in 1615. A year later, he was appointed the captain of the royal castle at Ónod. He married a wealthy heiress, Zsuzsanna Lorántffy. He would emphasize in his last will that his wife was the most beautiful and pleasant woman whom he met in his life. They settled in Szerencs, but later moved to her inherited estate, Sárospatak. They were enthusiastic adherents of the Reformed Church. He supported Gabriel Bethlen, the Calvinist Prince of Transylvania, against the Catholic pretender, György Drugeth. When Drugeth was planning to break into Transylvania, George visited Bethlen in July 1616.

Rudolph's successor, Matthias II, favored the Catholic noblemen, although most Hungarian noblemen adhered to Protestantism. The childless monarch's designated heir, Ferdinand, was notorious for his strong commitment to Counter-Reformation. Matthias was still alive when Ferdinand was crowned king of Hungary at the Diet in Pressburg on 1 July 1618. George was absent from the Diet.

The Habsburg monarchs' Anti-Protestant measures had outraged the predominantly Protestant Bohemian noblemen. Their representatives broke into the Prague Castle and threw Matthias's two Catholic lieutenants out of a window on 22 May 1618. The Bohemian rebels sent envoys to the Protestant countries, seeking assistance against the Habsburgs.

The Habsburgs' Anti-Protestant policy annoyed George who was a leader of the Hungarian Protestants. He urged Gabriel Bethlen to intervene in the conflict on behalf of the Bohemian rebels. He also started to hire Hajdú troops in summer 1619. To prevent Rákóczi and Bethlen's cooperation, András Dóczy, the commander of the royal troops in Upper Hungary, offered Rákóczi's estates to Bethlen on the king's behalf. Instead of accepting Dóczy's offer, Bethlen informed Rákóczi that he had decided to invade Royal Hungary. To facilitate Bethlen's invasion, Rákóczi tried to capture Drugeth, but he could not prevent him from fleeing to Poland. Then Rákóczi marched to Kassa and persuaded the predominantly Evangelical (or Lutheran) burghers to surrender on 5 September. A day later, his Hajdú troops tortured and murdered three Jesuit priests, Melchior Grodziecki, Marko Krizin and Stephen Pongracz.

Rákóczi returned to Sárospatak to meet with Bethlen who arrived at the head of the Transylvanian army on 17 September. They went to Kassa where Bethlen held an assembly with the deputies of the noblemen and towns of Upper Hungary. The deputies elected Rákóczi the commander of Upper Hungary on 21 September. He established his seat in Kassa. Drugeth hired irregular troops (primarily Cossacks) in Poland and broke into Zemplén County on 21 November. Rákóczi tried to stop their invasion, but he was defeated in the Battle of Humenné on 23 November. Bethlen soon lifted the siege of Vienna and hurried back to Hungary. He blamed Rákóczi for the defeat, describing him as a young and inexperienced commander in a letter to the burghers of Kassa.

Drugeth's troops plundered the region of Kassa, but they could not capture the town. Rákóczi ordered the mobilization of the local troops. The Cossacks left Hungary before the end of 1619, and Drugeth followed them to Poland in early next year. Ferdinand's army laid siege to Pressburg in October, but Rákóczi hurried to the town and forced the invaders to lift the siege. However, Ferdinand's troops inflicted a decisive defeat on the Bohemian army in the Battle of White Mountain on 8 November. His commander, Bucquoy, invaded Upper Hungary, forcing Bethlen to withdraw his troops as far as Kassa in the first half of 1621. Most Hungarian noblemen sought a reconciliation with Ferdinand, but Rákóczi remained loyal to Bethlen. After Bethlen's opponents seized the fortress of Fülek (now Fiľakovo in Slovakia), Rákóczi laid siege to it in April, but he could not force the defenders to surrender. Bethlen launched a counter-attack against Ferdinand's army in August. Rákóczi joined the military campaign and participated in the siege of Pressburg, but he returned to his family to Sárospatak in late August, only to return a month later at Bethlen's demand.

Bethlen and Ferdinand concluded a peace treaty in January 1622. The Peace of Nikolsburg authorized Bethlen to rule seven counties in Hungary—Abaúj, Bereg, Borsod, Szabolcs, Szatmár, Ugocsa and Zemplén—till the end of his life. Five of these were handed back to the Habsburg monarchy after Rákóczi's death with Szabolcs and Szatmár remaining Transylvanian.

George remained in Bethlen's service till Bethlen died in 1629. Bethlen was briefly succeeded by his widow Catherine, and then his brother Istvan. But the Transylvanian Estates soon turned to George instead. On 1 December 1630, at Segesvár, the Transylvanian parliament elected Rákóczi as Prince; he ruled until his death in 1648.

== Reign ==
Stephen Bethlen, the brother of the former prince, decided to gain power over Transylvania and therefore in January 1636 he convinced the Pasha of Buda Husein to support removing Rákóczi from the throne, to be the prince of Transylvania himself. After this, the Transylvanian orders held a meeting in Kolozsvár, where they declared that they shout at Rákóczi and if necessary "the orders are ready to protect the rights and freedoms of their country even at the risk of their lives and to stand up as a whole country for their prince". Husein Pasha sent an envoy in the person of Czausz Ali to Rákóczi, with the message that Rákóczi should submit to the Sultan and abdicate. However, Rákóczi detained Ali and declared martial law in the country. He sent his men to Silesia and Poland for mercenaries, called the Transylvanian Hungarian nobility, the Székelys and the Hajduks to war. In response, Sultan Murad IV sent 20–30 thousand Turkish soldiers against Transylvania led by Bekir Bey.However, the Ottoman troops were defeated by the Transylvanian forces at Szalonta on 6 October, and Husein Pasha when he heard this he realized that that he is forced to make peace with Rákóczi. According to the Treaty of Szászváros, the sultan recognizes Rákóczi's full authority over Transylvania, and he grants amnesty to Bethlen. Due to the failure of the campaign, the Sultan killed Begir Bey and replaced the Pasha of Buda, Husein. George Rákóczi gained enormous prestige with his victory.

=== Intervention in the conflict between Moldavia and Wallachia in 1637 ===
The ruler of Moldavia, Vasile Lupu, wanted to get the throne of Wallachia for his son Ioan, so in the fall of 1637 he attacked Matei Basarab, the ruler of Wallachia. George Rákóczi immediately sent his general János Kemény with a few thousand Székely infantry and cavalry, to help Matei. In November Kemény's brigade crossed the Eastern Carpathians and united with Matei's forces and together they pushed Lupu back to Moldavia. However, the Moldavian ruler did not give up and attacked again two years later, but Matei defeated him again with the help of a Transylvanian cavalry team sent by Rákóczi near Bucharest on 6 December 1639. For Rákóczi's support, Matei had to pay him 5,000 thalers and one horse tax per year.

=== Thirty Years War ===
==== Campaign against the Habsburg Monarchy in 1644–45 ====
In 1644, he intervened in the Thirty Years War, declaring war against Emperor Ferdinand III. He contacts the ambassadors of Sweden and France to weaken the rule of the Habsburgs together. He took the whole of Upper Hungary with the offensive launched in February of that year, and the people there supported him and many joined him. In March, Rákóczi marched victoriously into Kassa, the capital of the region. Against this, Ferdinand sent the German generals Götz and Puchheim to Hungary, and Miklós Eszterházy joined to German troops with Hungarians loyal to the emperor. The imperial army consisted of 25 thousand people. This army defeated a team of Transylvanians in Galgóc, killing its commander, György Kapoczay. Rákóczi made a tactical retreat to the south and left his faithful man Reöthy Orbán with 3,000 men in Kassa. The Habsburg army reached the city on 6 June and began to besiege it, but were unable to take it. Meanwhile, the prince sent János Kemény with 15,000 men there, and Kemény he successfully cut the supply lines and inflicted significant losses on the besiegers by raiding on horseback. Götz was forced to retreat from Kassa after an 11-day siege, however Kemény was on their trail and, attacking their rearguard at Somos on 26 June, thoroughly routed it. The Hungarian troops marched on and took towns like Szendrő and Eperjes in summer. By the end of autumn, Rákóczi had occupied the most of Lower Hungary as well, and in the winter both sides paused the war.

At the beginning of 1645, the military operations continued and Rákóczi and his army took Nagyszombat, and contacted the Swedish general Torstenson with a view to an operation against Vienna. However, his nominal overlord, the Ottoman Sultan, ordered him to end the campaign. Despite this, Rákóczi continued his campaign and in June crossed the Moravian border, personally joined the Swedish army besieging Brno for a projected march against Vienna. At that time, the plague broke out in Hungary, and he realized that this was the right moment to make peace with the opponent. An armistice was signed on 22 August, and the formulating peace points with the imperial envoys, and 4 months later they signed them in Linz.

On 16 December 1645, the Peace of Linz was signed, which further strengthened important peace points. Seven counties (Upper Hungary) were annexed to Transylvania, and after Rákóczi's death, with the exception of two, they returned to the Habsburgs, Rákóczi also received the settlements of Tokaj Regéc, Ecsed, etc., which are also inherited by his descendants. The peace also recognized religious freedom in Royal Hungary, which also applied to serfs. And the confiscated Protestant churches there were reopened. Rákóczi returned to Transylvania satisfied, because he not only consolidated the influence of Transylvania but also the autonomy of Royal Hungary against Habsburg rule.

== Family ==
Ancestors of George I Rákóczi

16. András Rákóczi
8. Zsigmond Rákóczi
17. Krisztina Polyák
4. János Rákóczi
9. Dóra Haraszthy
2. Sigismund Rákóczi
5. Sára Némethy
1. George I Rákóczi
6. János Gerendi
3. Anna Gerendi
14. Bertalan Erdélyi
7. Kata Erdélyi
30. Péter Kemény
15. Kata Kemény

György was married to Zsuzsanna Lorántffy. They had four sons:

- Samuel (1617–1618)
- George Rákóczi II (1621–1660)
- Sigismund Rákóczi (1622–1652), who married Henriette Marie of the Palatinate
- Frank (1624–1632)

== Sources ==
- Hangay, Zoltán (1987). Erdély választott fejedelme: Rákóczi Zsigmond [Elected Prince of Transylvania: Sigismund Rákóczi]. Zrínyi Kiadó. ISBN 963-326-363-8.
- Nagy, László (1984). A "bibliás őrálló" fejedelem: I. Rákóczi György a magyar históriában [The "Bible-reader and Guarding" Prince: George I Rákóczi in Hungarian Hitoriography]. Magvető Kiadó. ISBN 963-14-0204-5.
- Parker, Geoffrey (1987). The Thirty Years' War. Routledge. ISBN 0-415-15458-8.
- Péter, Katalin (1981). "A három részre szakadt ország és a török kiűzése (1526–1605)". In Benda, Kálmán; Péter, Katalin (eds.). Magyarország történeti kronológiája, II: 1526–1848 [Historical Chronology of Hungary, Volume I: 1526–1848] (in Hungarian). Akadémiai Kiadó. pp. 361–430. ISBN 963-05-2662-X.
- Péter, Katalin (1994). "The Golden Age of the Principality (1606–1660)". In Köpeczi, Béla; Barta, Gábor; Bóna, István; Makkai, László; Szász, Zoltán; Borus, Judit (eds.). History of Transylvania. Akadémiai Kiadó. pp. 301–358. ISBN 963-05-6703-2.
- Szilagyi, Sandor(1893) Elsö Rákóczy György, 1593-1648. Magyart Történelmi Társulat, Budapest 482 p
- Várkonyi, Gábor (2012). "I. Rákóczi György". In Gujdár, Noémi; Szatmáry, Nóra (eds.). Magyar királyok nagykönyve: Uralkodóink, kormányzóink és az erdélyi fejedelmek életének és tetteinek képes története [Encyclopedia of the Kings of Hungary: An Illustrated History of the Life and Deeds of Our Monarchs, Regents and the Princes of Transylvania] (in Hungarian). Reader's Digest. pp. 218–221. ISBN 978-963-289-214-6.

Preceded by Catherine of Brandenburg	Prince of Transylvania; 1630–1648	Succeeded by George II Rákóczi
