= Zsófia Báthory =

Hungarian princess (1629–1680)

- Princess consort of Transylvania
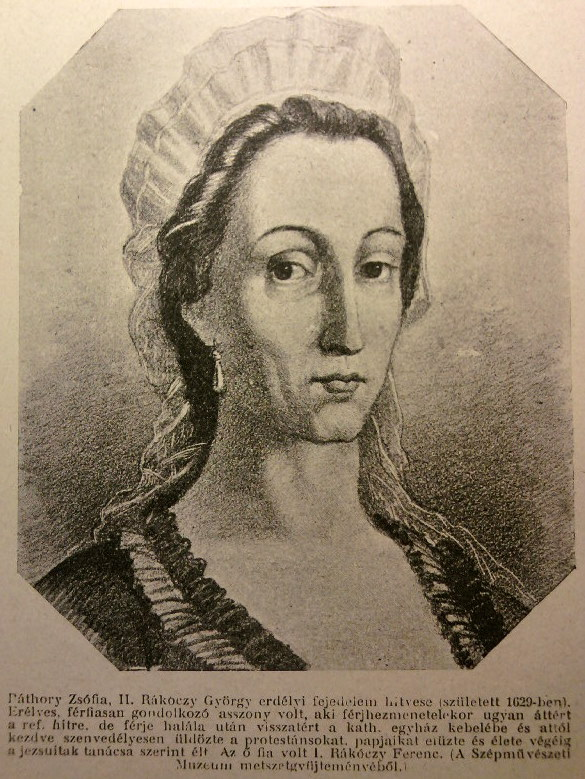
- 1910 illustration of Báthory
- Born: 1629; Șimleu Silvaniei, Principality of Transylvania
- Died: June or July 1680 (aged 50–51); Palanok Castle, Mukachevo, Principality of Transylvania
- Spouse: George II Rákóczi (m. 1643; died 1660)
- Issue: Francis I Rákóczi
- House: Báthory (by birth); Rákóczi (by marriage)
- Religion: Roman Catholicism (1629–1643); Reformed Christianity (1643–1660); Roman Catholicism (1660–death)

Zsófia Báthory (1629 – 2 June or 14 July 1680) was a Hungarian noblewoman and princess consort of Transylvania through her marriage to George II Rákóczi. A rare love marriage, although forced to convert to Reformed Christianity, she secretly followed her birth religion of Roman Catholicism, keeping Jesuits in court and raising her son, Francis I Rákóczi, in the religion. Following her husband's death in 1660, she publicly converted back to Catholicism with her son, and imposed strict anti-Protestant legislature and beliefs throughout the region.

== Biography ==
Zsófia Báthory was born in 1629 to Anna Zakreska and András Báthory, in Șimleu Silvaniei. Throughout her life, she was married thrice, to Count László Haller, Count József Teleki, and George II Rákóczi, whom she married on 3 February 1643. She converted from Catholicism to Reformed Christianity upon her marriage. The wedding was a love marriage; he proposed to her on 25 January 1643 at the Báthory family estate. István Geleji Katona officiated the wedding. Báthory discovered she was expected to convert religions shortly before the wedding, and cried over the topic over a month after it. George I Rákóczi made the controversial decision of allowing the marriage to continue despite her religion due to his son's "consuming love".

However, Gabriella Erdélyi for the journal Social History proposed that the marriage was deliberately interfaith to strengthen the royal family's ties with Catholics, and was instead "sold" as a love marriage to cover this up. She secretly still followed Catholicism, keeping Jesuits in her court and raising her son, Francis I Rákóczi, in the religion. After her husband's death on 7 June 1660, she abandoned Reformed Christianity and publicly embraced Catholicism with her son. On 15 August 1661, she partook in the Assumption of Mary with him.

The pair soon began discriminating against Protestants. She forcefully expelled Protestant students and teachers in Sárospatak, and founded a college, Missio Rakocziana, for Jesuits. She forced mass conversions to Catholicism, and thus became a target by rebel groups, seeking safety in Palanok Castle. Although frequently criticised for her religious intolerance, Báthory did partake in some charitable efforts. When three Franciscans in Vynohradiv were severely wounded and chased away, she assisted in their care, which helped them survive. She similarly supported Franciscans in other ways, including through financial donations to a destroyed church.

In 1676, she helped build Church of the Holy Trinity, Košice, for Jesuit martyrs. In addition to her religious changes, she also contributed to contemporary literature. Her only surviving piece of work was a prayer book, which was printed in Levoča in the 1700s. She was the grandmother of Francis II Rákóczi. She died in Palanok Castle on either 2 June or 14 July 1680.
