= Battle of Humenné =

1619 battle of the Thirty Years' War

Coordinates: 48°56′09″N 21°54′24″E

- Part of the Thirty Years' War
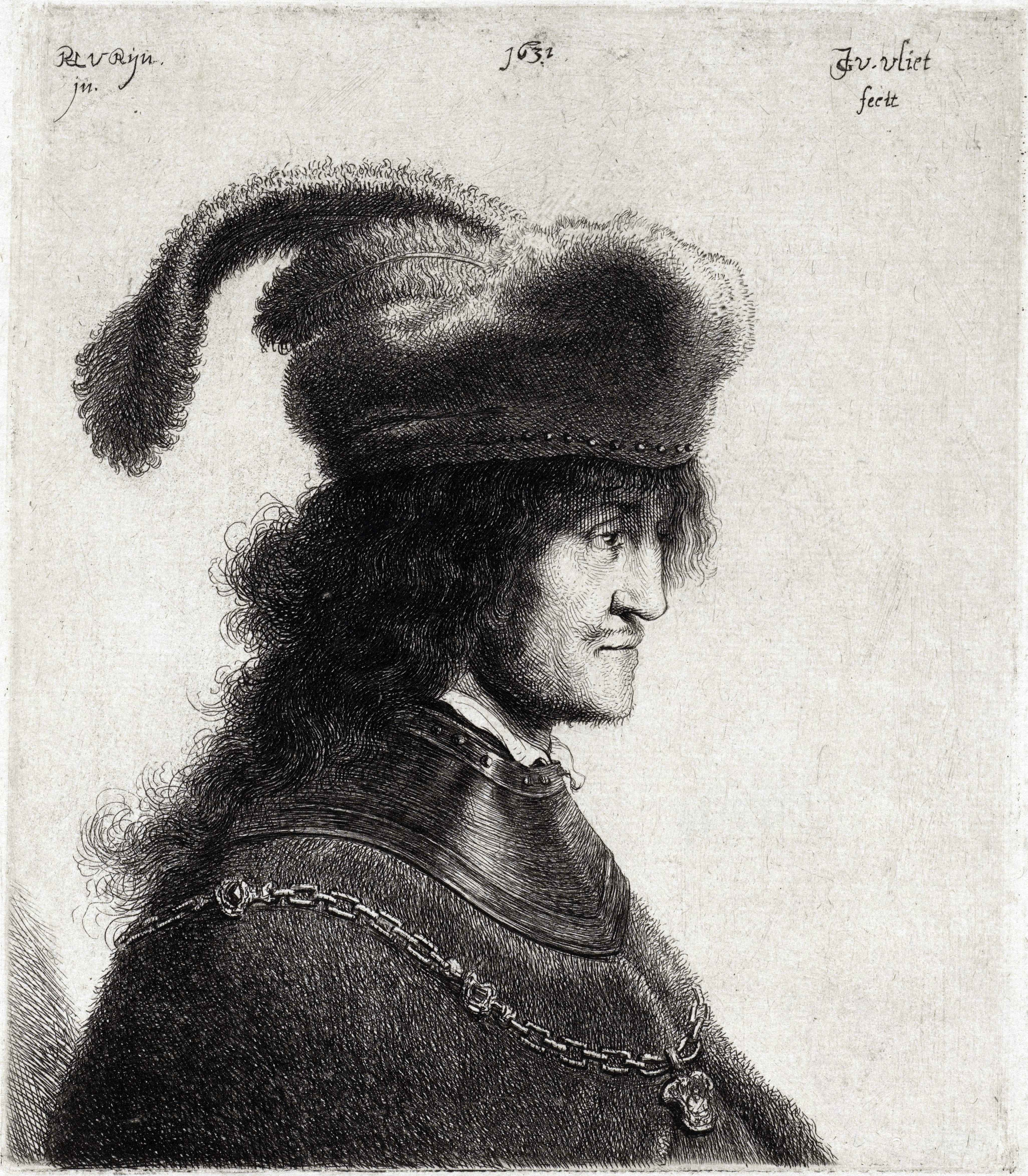
| Date | 22–23 November 1619 |
| Location | Homonna, Upper Hungary, Habsburg Hungary (present-day Humenné, Slovakia) |
| Result | Polish victory |

Belligerents
| Lisowczyks; Holy Roman Empire; Habsburg Hungary | Principality of Transylvania |

Commanders and leaders
| Walenty Rogawski | (Transylvania) George Rákóczi |

Strength
| 8,000–10,000 | 3,500–7,000 |

Casualties and losses
| 650–2,500 | 850–3,000 |
- Location within Slovakia

The Battle of Humenné (Hungarian: Homonnai csata, Polish: bitwa pod Humiennem or pierwsza odsiecz wiedeńska) took place on 22–23 November 1619 near Humenné (eastern Slovakia) during the first period of the Thirty Years' War between the Transylvanian army and the joined loyalist Hungarian and Polish forces of Lisowczycy. It was the only battle of that war to involve the Polish–Lithuanian Commonwealth.

The battle was won by the Polish cavalry led by Walenty Rogawski against the Transylvanian corps commanded by George Rákóczi, the future Prince of Transylvania.

== Prelude ==
A lot of nations of the Holy Roman Empire saw the Thirty Years' War as a perfect opportunity to (re)gain their independencies. One of them was Hungary led by Gábor Bethlen, Prince of Transylvania. He joined Bohemia in the anti-Habsburg Protestant Union. In a short period of time, he conquered northern Hungary and Bratislava, and in November he started a siege of Vienna - the capital city of Austria and the Holy Roman Empire. The situation of Emperor Ferdinand II was dramatic. The emperor sent a letter to Sigismund III of Poland, and asked him to cut the supply lines of Bethlen from Transylvania. He also sent George Drugeth, count of Homonna - former rival of Bethlen, now Lord Chief Justice of Royal Hungary - to Poland, to hire forces for the Habsburgs.

The Polish–Lithuanian Commonwealth did not want to participate in the war, so it remained neutral. But the king being a strong sympathizer of the Catholic League and the Habsburgs, decided to help the emperor. Though he didn't want to send forces directly, he allowed Drugeth to hire mercenaries in Poland. Drugeth hired around 8,000 Lisowczycy led by Rogawski, who joined his own 3,000 men. The joined army included around 11,000 soldiers, but this number is disputed.

== Battle ==
The Lisowczycy faced George Rákóczi's corps near Humenné in the Carpathian Mountains in the evening on 22 November. Walenty Rogawski did not manage to hold the cavalry together and it split up. Next day, on 23 November, Rákóczi decided to send his infantry in order to pillage the enemy's camp. While it was doing so, Rogawski finally gathered his troops and unexpectedly attacked the Transylvanians. In a short time, Rákóczi had to announce a retreat. The battle was won by the Polish.

== Aftermath ==
When Bethlen found out about Rákóczi's defeat, he had to break the siege, gather his soldiers and return to Bratislava, and sent about 12,000 cavalry to northern Hungary led by George Széchy, in order to secure it against the Lisowczycy. Ferdinand II made him sign a cease-fire and on 16 January 1620 they signed a peace treaty in Pozsony (now Bratislava).

The battle of Humenné was an important part of the war as the Polish intervention saved Vienna - the capital city of the Holy Roman Empire - from Transylvania. That is why some Polish sources call it the first Vienna relief - the second being the famous Battle of Vienna in 1683.

== See also ==
- Moldavian Magnate Wars

== Sources ==
- Bánlaky, József (1928). "Az 1619. évi hadjárat". A magyar nemzet hadtörténelme (in Hungarian).
- Biernacki, Witold (2006). Biała Góra 1620 (in Polish). Gdańsk: Wydawnictwo Finna. ISBN 8389929902.
