= Peace of Tyrnau =

1615 treaty between Holy Roman Emperor Matthias and Gábor Bethlen

The Peace of Tyrnau or Treaty of Nagyszombat was signed on 6 May 1615 between Holy Roman Emperor Matthias and Gábor Bethlen. Based on the terms of the treaty, Bethlen was recognized as the Prince of Transylvania.

Tyrnau is the German name of the Slovak city of Trnava, also called Nagyszombat in Hungarian, located in western Slovakia, 47 km (29 mi) to the north-east of Bratislava, on the Trnávka river.

== See also ==
- List of treaties
