= Maria Christina, Princess of Transylvania =

Princess regnant of Transylvania in 1598

Maria Christina of Austria
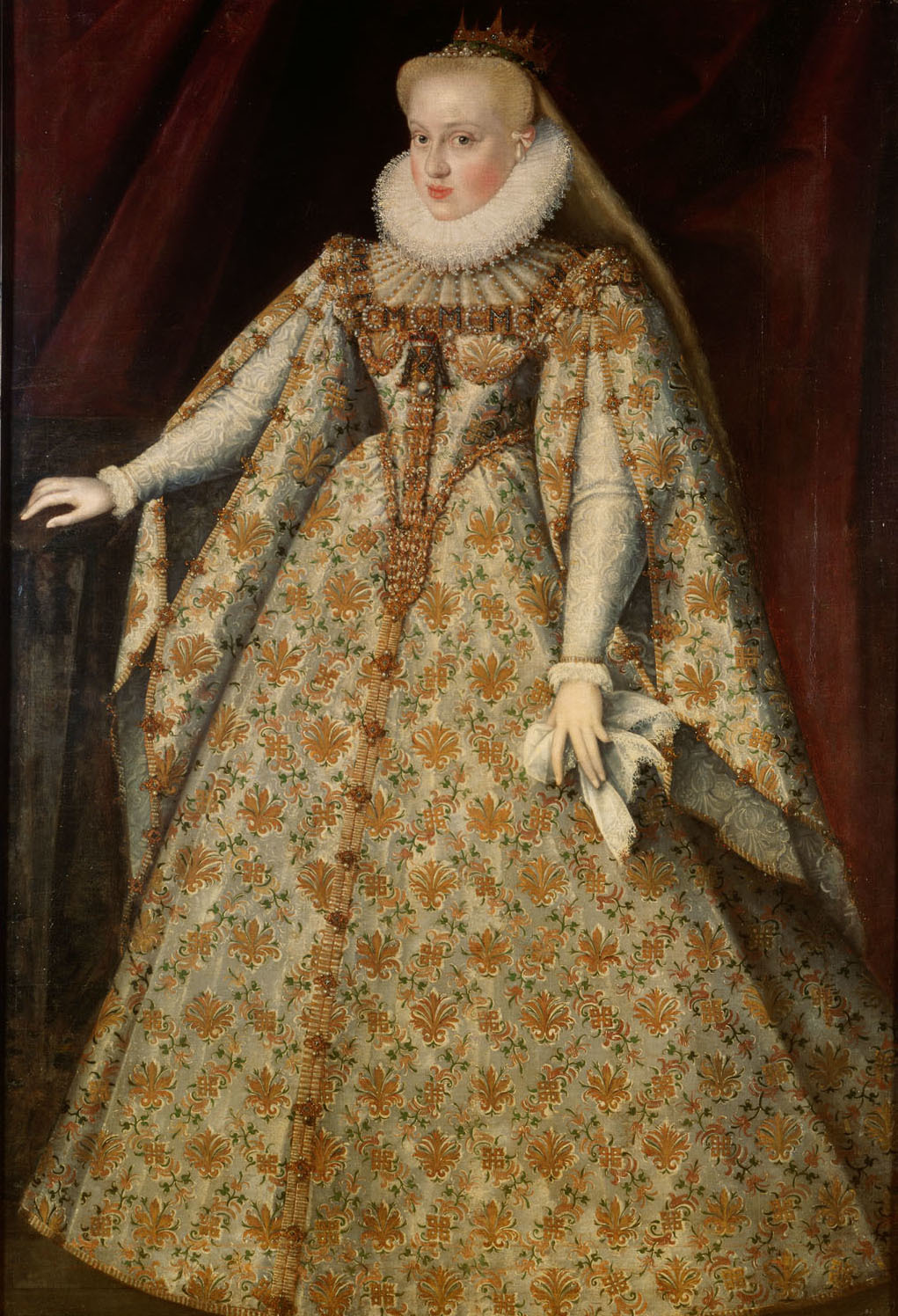
- Portrait of Maria Christina, Princess of Transylvania by Ottavio Zanuoli c.1595

Princess consort of Transylvania
- Tenure: 13 December 1596 – 23 March 1598; 20 August 1598 – 21 March 1599

Princess of Transylvania
- Reign: 18 April 1598 – 20 August 1598
- Born: 10 November 1574; Graz, Duchy of Styria, Holy Roman Empire
- Died: 6 April 1621 (aged 46); Hall in Tirol, County of Tyrol, Holy Roman Empire
- Burial: Hall in Tirol, Austria
- Spouse: Sigismund Báthory
- House: House of Habsburg
- Father: Charles II, Archduke of Austria
- Mother: Maria Anna of Bavaria

Maria Christina of Austria (10 November 1574 – 6 April 1621), was a Princess of Transylvania by marriage to Sigismund Báthory, and for a period in 1598 elected sovereign Princess regnant of Transylvania.

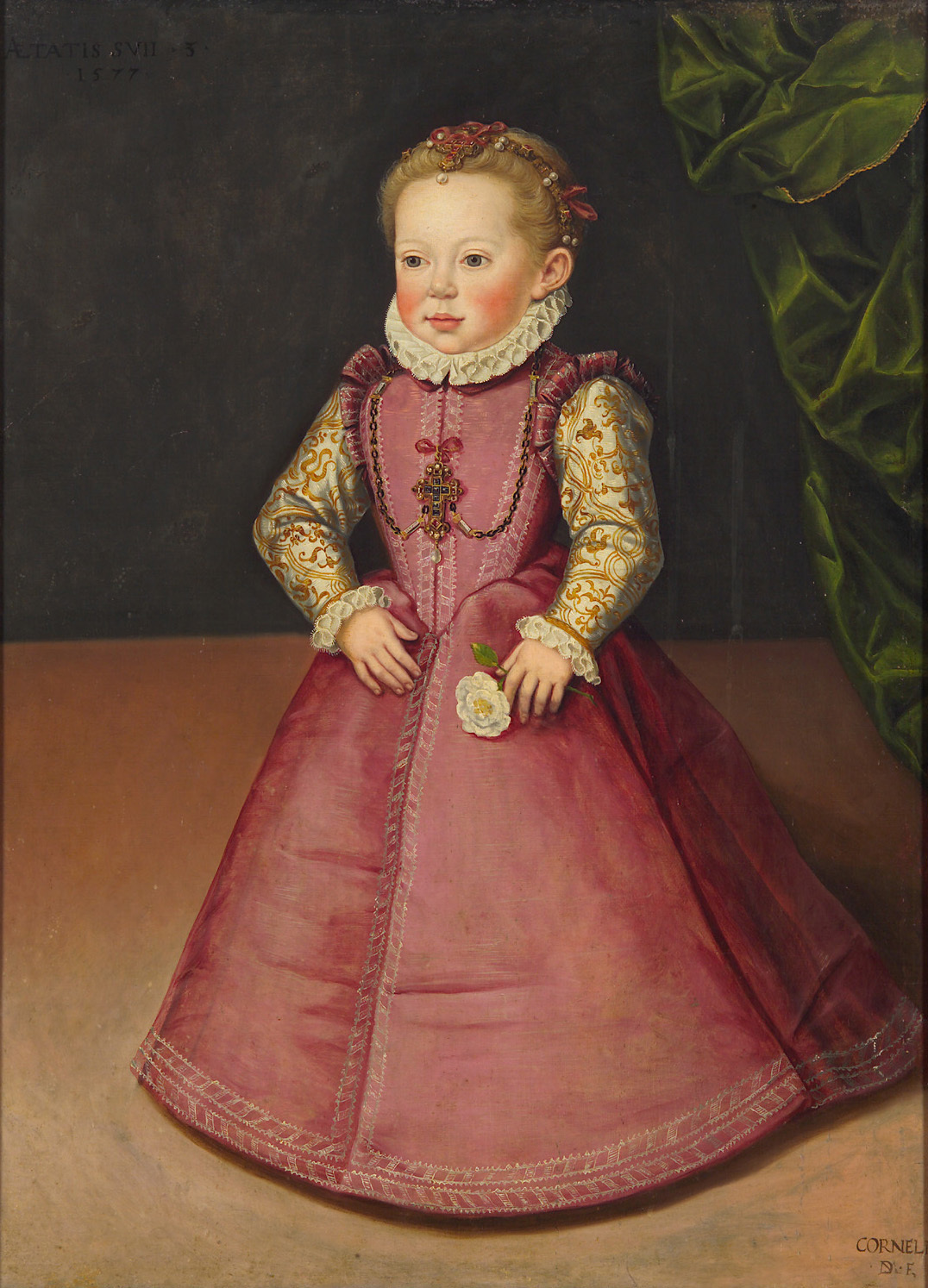
Portrait by Cornelis Vermeyen (c. 1577)

== Life ==
Born on 10 November 1574, she was the daughter of Archduke Charles II of Austria, the son of Emperor Ferdinand I, and Maria Anna of Bavaria. Her younger brother Archduke Ferdinand, succeeded as Holy Roman Emperor in 1619.

=== Marriage ===
On 7 February 1595, it was received in Graz the formal petition of marriage between Maria Christina and Sigismund Báthory, ruling Prince of Transylvania, by the nobleman Stephen Bocskay. The marriage contract was negotiated for almost a month, and finally the bride on 15 June accompanied by her mother, the Prince-Bishop George of Lavant and 6000 German horsemen. In Kaschau, Maria Christina fell ill with a fever, which delayed the re-ride. The formal marriage took place in Weissenburg on 6 August, and soon after Maria Christina moved to Transylvania.

=== Princess consort ===
The marriage was regarded as a major political gain, as Sigismund, formerly a vassal of the Ottoman Empire, now formed close ties with the Holy Roman Empire. Emperor Rudolf II appointed Sigismund Prince of the Holy Roman Empire (Reichsfürst), and also secured the possession of Transylvania, if the couple remain without offspring. The agreement was signed on 16 January 1595 by the Hungarian parliament in Bratislava.

However, this union proved to be completely unhappy; Sigismund, after a disastrous wedding night, refused to consummate the marriage and sent his wife to a fortress in Kővárgara, where Maria Christina was kept as prisoner.

=== Reign ===
On 18 April 1598, at the request of the local nobility, she was elected to occupy the Transylvanian throne after her husband abdicated. However, her rule was only nominal because Emperor Rudolf II sent representatives to rule. On 20 August, Sigismund Báthory regained the throne and reconciled with his wife, but sent her again to Kővár.

=== Later life ===
When Sigismund abdicated for a second time in March 1599, Maria Christina finally left him and returned to Austria in April. On 17 August 1599, Pope Clement VIII dissolved her marriage, and in 1607, she joined to her younger sister Eleanor in the Haller Convent (Haller Damenstift) in Hall in Tirol, where she died on 6 April 1621, aged 46.

== Ancestors ==
Ancestors of Maria Christina, Princess of Transylvania

16. Maximilian I, Holy Roman Emperor
8. Philip I of Castile (= 28)
17. Mary of Burgundy
4. Ferdinand I, Holy Roman Emperor (=14)
18. Ferdinand II of Aragon
9. Joanna of Castile (= 29)
19. Isabella I of Castile
2. Charles II of Austria
20. Casimir IV Jagiellon
10. Vladislas II of Bohemia and Hungary (= 30)
21. Elisabeth of Austria
5. Anna of Bohemia and Hungary (=15)
22. Gaston de Foix, Count of Candale
11. Anna of Foix-Candale (= 31)
23. Catherine of Foix
1. Archduchess Maria Christina of Austria
24. Albert IV, Duke of Bavaria
12. William IV, Duke of Bavaria
25. Kunigunde of Austria
6. Albert V, Duke of Bavaria
26. Philip I, Margrave of Baden
13. Marie of Baden-Sponheim
27. Elisabeth of the Palatinate
3. Maria Anna of Bavaria
28. Philip I of Castile (= 8)
14. Ferdinand I, Holy Roman Emperor (= 4)
29. Joanna of Castile (= 9)
7. Anna of Austria
30. Vladislas II of Bohemia and Hungary (= 10)
15. Anna of Bohemia and Hungary (= 5)
31. Anna of Foix-Candale (= 11)
