= Bethlen =

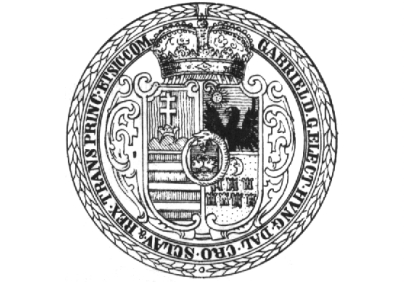
Seal of Prince Gabriel Bethlen de Iktár

The House of Bethlen is the name of two Hungarian ancient noble families, Bethlen de Iktár and Bethlen de Bethlen. Although both families have similar coat of arms, they have no proven mutual ancestry. Both can trace their noble lineage up to the 12th and 13th centuries, and their family members played a significant role in the history of Transylvania and Hungary within the Habsburg Empire.

Bethlen is the Hungarian and adopted German name of two places in Transylvania, Romania, which are both called Beclean in Romanian: the town of Beclean in Bistrița-Năsăud County, and the commune of Beclean (German: Bethlen or Badlinen, Hungarian: Bethlen), in Brașov County.

== Notable members ==
Partial, chronological list.

- Bethlen, son of Lőrinc, Hungarian nobleman, ancestor of the Bethlen and Apafi families
- Gabriel Bethlen de Iktár (1580–1629), Prince of Transylvania (1613–1629), Duke of Opole (1622–1625) and leader of an anti-Habsburg insurrection
- Stephan Bethlen de Iktár (1582–1648), Prince of Transylvania in 1630
- Katharina Bethlen de Iktár (1604–1649), Princess of Transylvania (1629–1630)
- János Bethlen de Bethlen (1613–1678), Hungarian aristocrat who served as Chancellor of Transylvania from 1659 to 1678
- Farkas Bethlen de Bethlen (1639–1679), Hungarian Count who succeeded his cousin as Chancellor of Transylvania from 1678 to 1679
- Katalin Bethlen de Bethlen (1700–1759) Hungarian aristocrat and author
- András Bethlen de Bethlen (1847–1898), Hungarian Count who served as Hungarian Minister of Agriculture (1890–1894)
- István Bethlen de Bethlen (1874–1946), Hungarian Count and statesman who served as Prime Minister of Hungary (1921–1931)
- Theodora, Countess Nikolaus Bethlen de Bethlen (b. 1986), German aristocrat

== See also ==
- List of titled noble families in the Kingdom of Hungary
