= Johannes Thesselius =

German-Transylvanian composer (c. 1590–1643)

Johannes Thesselius (Erfurt c. 1590 – Szeben, 1643) was a German-Transylvanian composer of church and dance music. He came from Vienna in 1625 to be kapellmeister to Gabriel Bethlen.
