= Miklós Bogáthi Fazekas =

Miklós Bogáthi Fazekas (Hungarian: Bogáthi Fazekas Miklós; 4 December 1548, in Torda – 1592 in Kolozsvár) was a Transylvanian Unitarian and Sabbatarian. He had been a teacher in Torda before the 1579 death of Ferenc Dávid. After he associated with the Szekler Sabbatarians who were later persecuted by the Calvinist bishop István Geleji Katona.
