= Jan Gillisz. van Vliet =

Dutch painter (1605–1668)

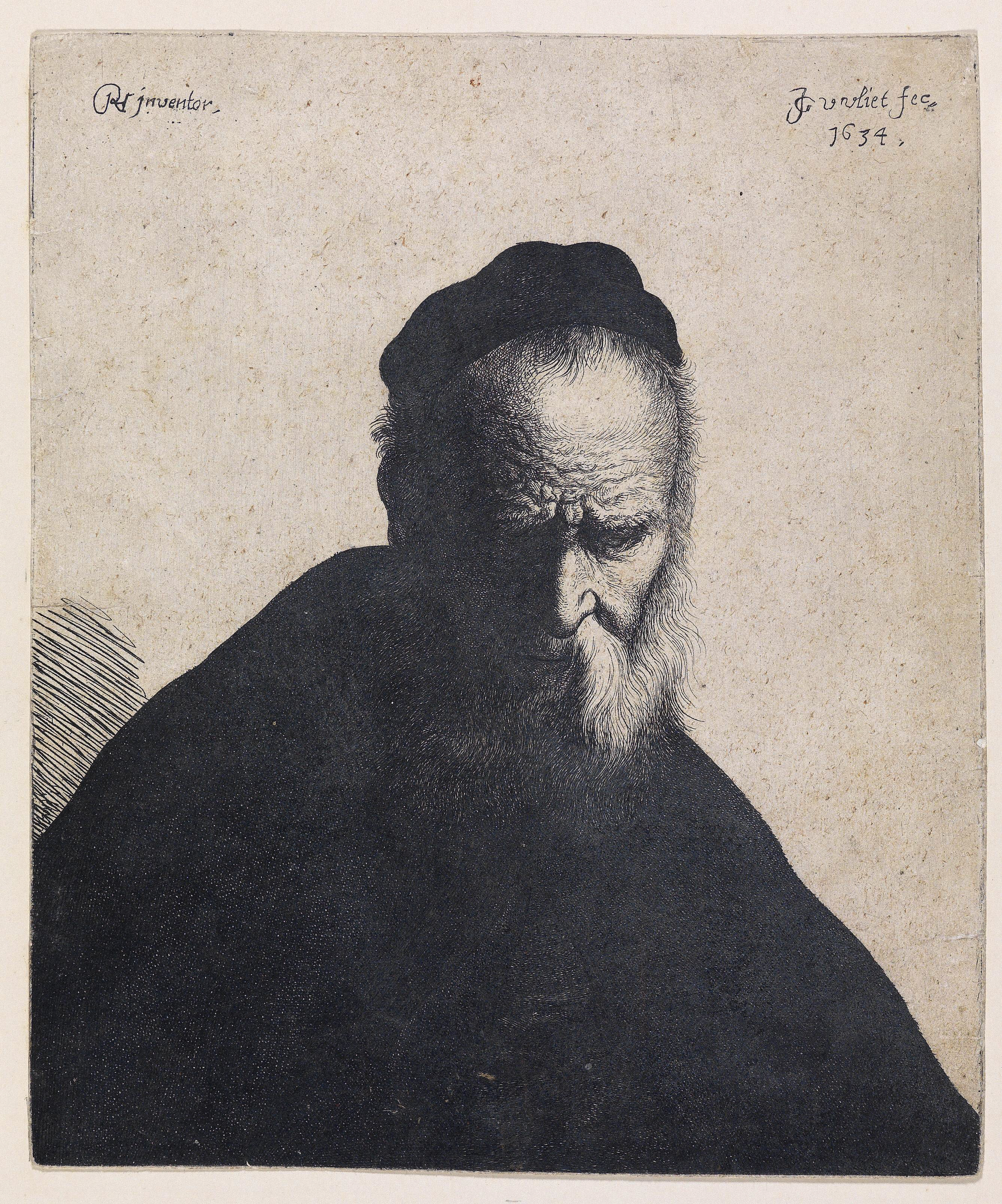
Old man, 1634

Jan Gillisz. van Vliet (1605–1668), was a Dutch Golden Age painter and Rembrandt pupil, whose paintings are no longer attributed to him with any certainty. Today he is known only for his drawings and prints.

== Biography ==
He was born in Leiden where he became a Rembrandt pupil. He made a popular print series called "the beggars" and signed his prints "JG Vliet fec". He died in Leiden.

Jan Giliszoon van Vliet was not Rembrandt's student, but collaborator. During the five years or so that he worked turning Rembrandt's designs into etchings, it was he who became Rembrandt's teacher. It was with him that Rembrandt began his own etching career and, being the superior draftsman, soon outstripped him. Their relationship ended when van Vliet married a rich woman and turned his attentions to managing her estate. As far as is known, he never produced any prints after that
