= György Káldy =

Hungarian Jesuit and Bible translator

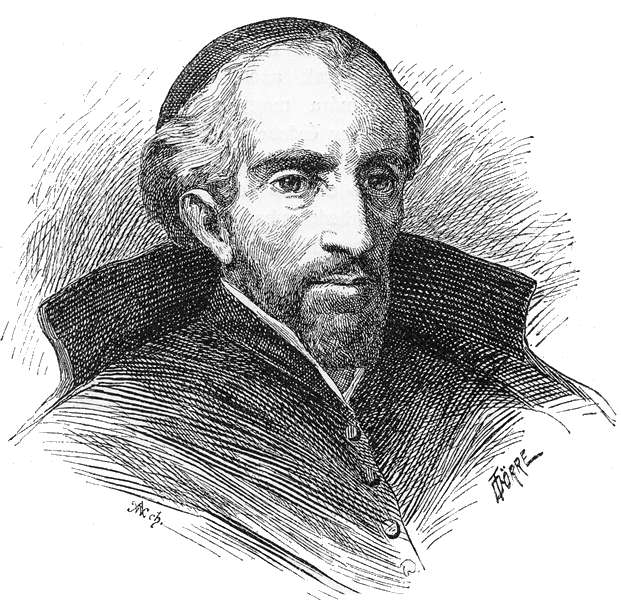
- Born: 1573
- Died: 1634 (aged 60–61)
- Occupations: Jesuit and Bible translator

György Káldy (1573–1634) was a Hungarian Jesuit and Bible translator.

Káldi was born in Nagyszombat, Kingdom of Hungary on February 4, 1573. He studied theology at the University of Vienna. In Rome, in 1598 he entered the Jesuit order. In 1625, he founded the College of Pozsony (Pressburg, today's Bratislava), and served as its rector until his death.

He devoted nearly half of his life to the translation of the Bible. He published the first Catholic translation of the Bible in Vienna, 1626. His version was based partly on the unpublished manuscripts of István Szántó, partly on the Vulgate. The printing of his translation in 1626 was supported by the Calvinist prince Gabriel Bethlen.

Káldi died in Pressburg (Pozsony, today's Bratislava, Slovakia) Kingdom of Hungary on October 30, 1634.
