= Catherine of Brandenburg =

Catherine
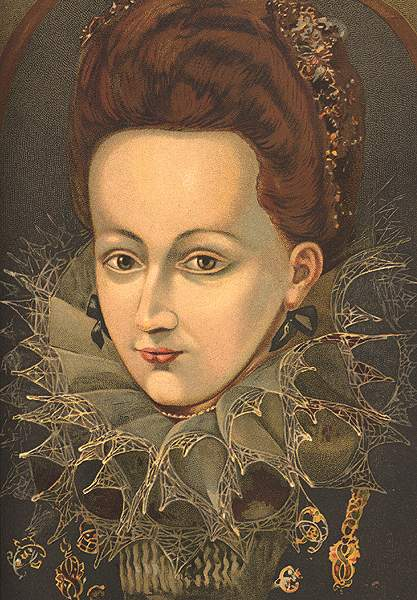

Princess of Transylvania
- Reign: 15 November 1629 - 21 September 1630
- Predecessor: Gabriel Bethlen
- Successor: Stephen Bethlen

Princess consort of Transylvania
- Tenure: 2 March 1626 – 15 November 1629
- Born: 28 May 1602; Königsberg, Prussia
- Died: 27 August 1649 (aged 47); Schöningen, Brunswick-Lüneburg, Holy Roman Empire
- Spouse: Gabriel Bethlen; Francis Charles of Saxe-Lauenburg
- House: Hohenzollern
- Father: John Sigismund, Elector of Brandenburg
- Mother: Duchess Anna of Prussia
- Religion: Lutheran; Catholic (after 1633)

Catherine of Brandenburg (28 May 1602 – 27 August 1649) was an elected Princess of Transylvania between 1629 and 1630. She was the daughter of John Sigismund, Elector of Brandenburg, and Anna of Prussia.

== Life ==
Catherine was the youngest daughter of Johann Sigismund and Anna. Catherine's maternal grandparents were Marie Eleonore of Cleves and Albert Frederick of Prussia, while her paternal grandparents were Joachim Frederick, Margrave of Brandenburg and his first wife Catherine of Brandenburg-Küstrin.

The relationship between her parents was said to be volatile with her father prone to drunken rages where her mother is reported to have thrown plates and glasses at her spouse during arguments. Although Anna was described as intellectually superior to her spouse, she was also considered temperamental and strong-willed.

In 1613, Johann Sigismund converted to Calvinism while his wife and daughters remained staunchly Lutheran.

In 1619, when Catherine was 16 years old, her father died and was succeeded by her brother George William. The following year, Catherine's oldest sister Maria Eleonora was considered a marriage candidate of the young Gustavus Adolphus of Sweden. But because of their brother's refusal to allow their sister's marriage, their mother Anna (who was in favour of it) sent both sisters to the Braunschweig court where their older sister Anna Sophia (married to Frederick Ulrich, Duke of Brunswick-Lüneburg) lived. This was so Georg Wilhelm could not keep Maria Eleonora from leaving Brandenburg.

Then through the help of the Swedish Chancellor of the Exchequer Axel Oxenstierna both sisters accompanied by Oxenstierna and his mother Barbro Bielke left for Sweden. Catherine and her mother then lived in Sweden for several years after the marriage of her sister Maria Eleonora to king Gustavus Adolphus of Sweden in 1620.

Catherine was educated to become an ideal consort of a ruler and was "richly decorated with virtues suitable to a princely woman". As for her appearance, although she was very short, she had a shapely figure and pleasing face.

Catherine had many important family connections that made her a very eligible bridal candidate. Notwithstanding her sister being queen of Sweden, she was also a cousin of Frederick III of Denmark.

In 1625, her mother Anna died.

=== Princess consort of Transylvania ===
On 2 March 1626, she married Gabriel Bethlen, prince of Transylvania. The marriage allied the Protestant Prince of Transylvania with the Protestant powers of Denmark, Sweden and the Palatinate. A proxy marriage was celebrated in Cölln an der Spree, after which the bride set off accompanied by her sister Anna Sophia, for her new homeland, where a second marriage in person performed in Kosice in Transylvania (now in Slovakia) took place. The couple settled in Alba Iulia in Transylvania.

The marriage is not described as happy. Gabriel Bethlen had numerous mistresses, and Catherine had lovers as well, most notably Istvan Csaky – because of the double standards of the time, however, only Catherine was given a bad reputation because of this.

The marriage remained childless. It was a condition in the marriage contract that Catherine should be elected the successor of her spouse, and she was elected as his successor by Transylvania's Diet and swore her solemn oath as his successor on May-June 1626, after which her status was confirmed by the Ottoman Porte through the effort of the Dutch and English allies of Bethlen. Bethlen confirmed her election in his political will, in which he noted "perhaps no other illustrious princely woman has ever been elected."

Prince Gabriel Bethlen died on 25 November 1629.

=== Princess Regnant of Transylvania ===
Her policy was to bring Transylvania back under the influence of Holy Roman Emperor Ferdinand II. She tried in vain for a year to hold on to the throne, supporting herself on her favorite Istvan Csaky, but she was forced to abandon power on 21 September 1630.

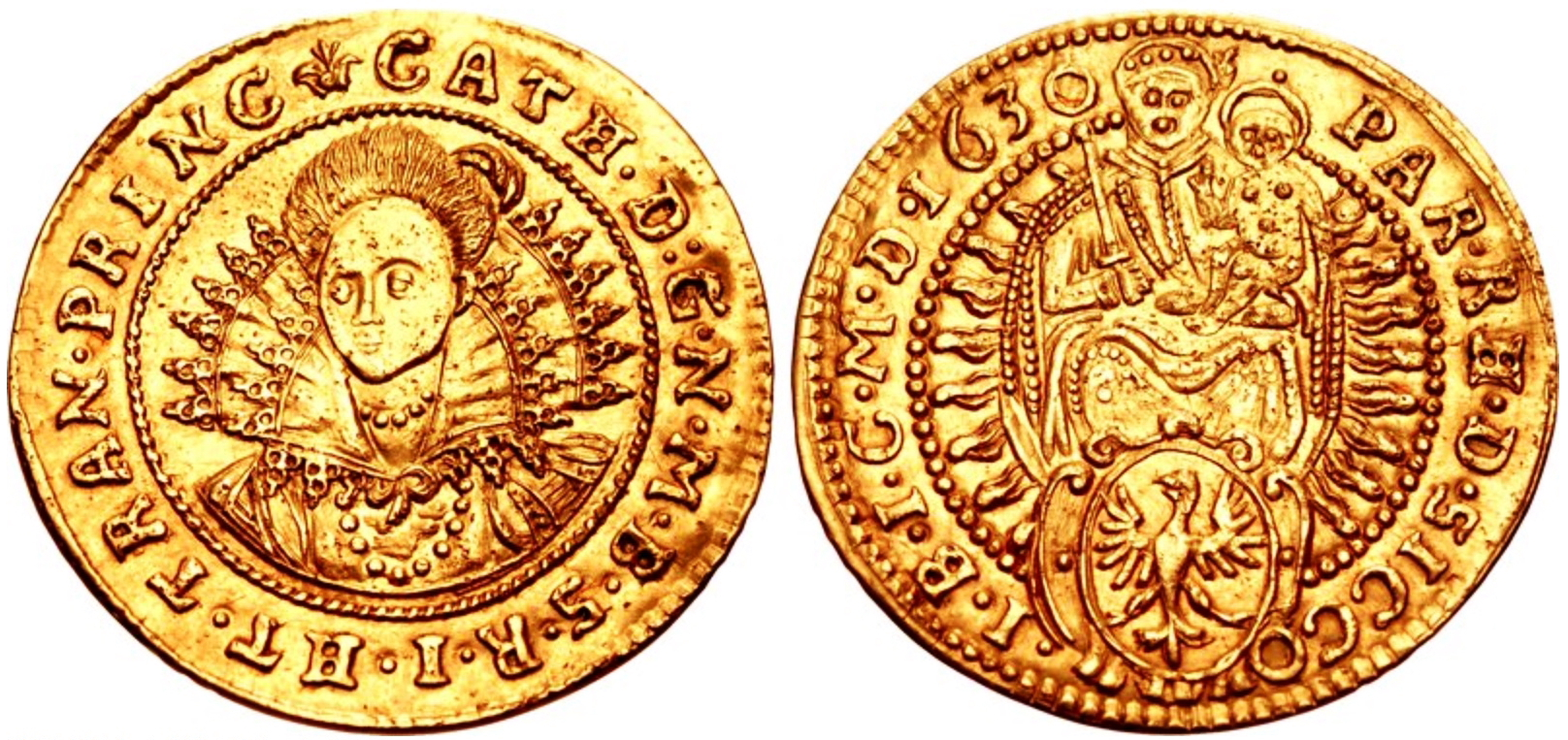
Transylvanian Ducat of Catherine of Brandenburg 1630

The Sublime Porte, first chose her brother-in-law Stephen Bethlen as successor, but finally George I Rákóczi succeeded her. The new prince was elected on 1 December 1630.

=== Later life ===
Catherine of Hohenzollern moved back to Germany where she converted to Catholicism in 1633.

In 1639 Catherine married Francis Charles of Saxe-Lauenburg, whose first wife had been Catherines great-aunt Agnes of Brandenburg. (d. 1629)

== Death ==
She died on 27 August 1649 at the home of her sister Anna Sophia in Schöningen.

== Ancestry ==
Ancestors of Catherine of Brandenburg

8. John George, Elector of Brandenburg
4. Joachim Frederick, Elector of Brandenburg
9. Sophie of Legnica
2. John Sigismund, Elector of Brandenburg
10. John, Margrave of Brandenburg-Küstrin
5. Catherine of Brandenburg-Küstrin
11. Catherine of Brunswick-Wolfenbüttel
1. Catherine of Brandenburg
12. Albert, Duke of Prussia
6. Albert Frederick, Duke of Prussia
13. Anna Maria of Brunswick-Calenberg-Göttingen
3. Duchess Anna of Prussia
14. William, Duke of Jülich-Cleves-Berg
7. Marie Eleonore of Cleves
15. Archduchess Maria of Austria

Preceded by Gabriel Bethlen	Princess of Transylvania; 1629–1630	Succeeded by George I Rákóczi
