= István Geleji Katona =

István Geleji Katona (1589–1649) was court-chaplain to the Calvinist Prince of Transylvania Gabriel Bethlen and an important figure of the 17th-century Transylvanian Reformed Church. He was notable for polemic anti-Catholic literature and against Szekler Sabbatarians. He sought to formalise the Calvinist liturgy and sacred music, reducing its diversity.
