= Zsuzsanna Lorántffy =

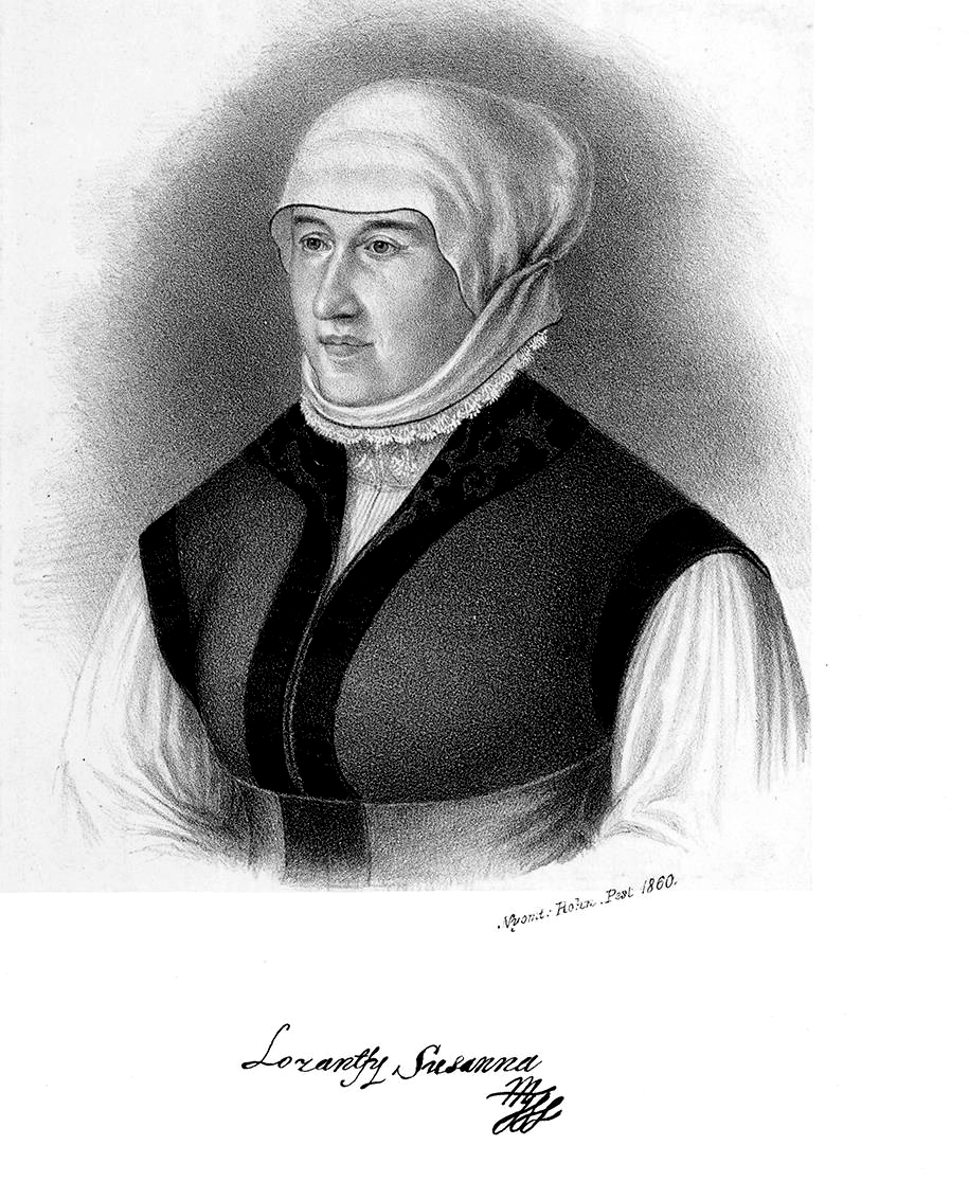
Zsuzsanna Lorántffy

Zsuzsanna Lorántffy, anglicized as Susanna Lorantffy (1602 in Ónod, Hungary – 1660 in Sárospatak, Hungary) was a Princess consort of Transylvania by marriage to György Rákóczi I, Prince of Transylvania.

== Early life ==
Born as one of three daughters of Mihály Lorántffy, one of the great lords of royal Hungary and his first wife Barbara Kamarás de Zelemér (d. 1609). After the death of her mother, her father remarried to Zsuzsanna Andrássy with whom he had two further daughters. Zsuzsanna and her sisters were brought up in Sárospatak, her family estate.

== Biography ==
A passionate Calvinist, she assisted her husband in his successful struggle to introduce Protestant reforms in the Transylvanian church.

Under her influence, John Amos Comenius, a prominent Calvinist teacher, took up residence in Sárospatak.

Her older son, George II Rákóczi, became Prince of Transylvania. Her younger son, Sigismund Rákóczi, Prince von Siebenbürgen, (1622–1652), was married to Henriette Marie of the Palatinate, daughter of Elizabeth of Bohemia.

She founded or sponsored several educational establishments, notably the Reformed College at Sárospatak.

Her Protestant religious beliefs compelled her to shun the pampered life of an aristocrat and instead to express her religion through action especially through development of girls' education. While living in Nagyvárad she ensured that girls were taught not only the skills needed to run a home and bring up a family, but also to read, write, and do arithmetic. They were to be versed in the Bible.

She sponsored the Várad Bible, a completely new translation (and not a reproduction of the Vizsoly Bible).

== Bibliography ==
- Benedict, Philip (2002). "11 Changing Political Circumstances on the Continent, c. 1570-c. 1700". Christ's Churches Purely Reformed: A Social History of Calvinism. Yale University Press.
