= Stephen Bethlen =

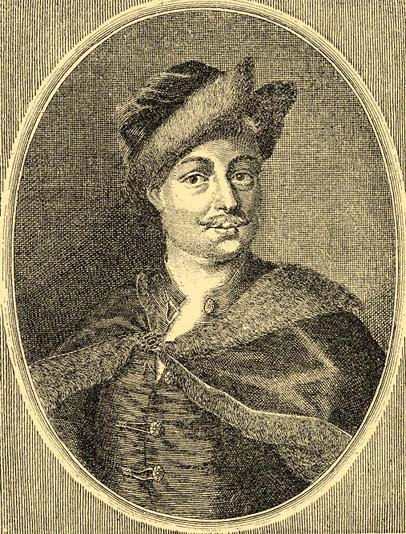
Stephen Bethlen

Stephen Bethlen de Iktár (1582 – 23 December 1648) was the Prince of Transylvania in late 1630.

== Early life ==
Stephen was the younger of the two sons of Farkas Bethlen de Iktár and Druzsiána Lázár de Szárhegy. He was born in his father's estate, Marosillye (now Ilia in Romania), in 1582.

He was the younger brother of Gabriel Bethlen, Prince of Transylvania between 1613-1629 and King-elect of Hungary.

According to contemporaries, Stephen Bethlen was rather poorly educated. Nevertheless, some people saw in him a successor who was to continue the policies of his brother, the prince. Gabriel Bethlen did everything in his power to equip and strengthen his younger brother with privileges. He gave him the castle of Khust and made him Voivode for life of Hunyad (Hunedoara) and owner of the Hunedoara castle (today part of Romania) and property in Máramaros County.

After the death of his brother, Stephen Bethlen tried on 25 January 1630 without success to take over the reign from his sister-in-law Catherine of Brandenburg. On 28 September 1630 he was more successful and raised to the rank of Prince of Transylvania in Kolozsvár, but he resigned after only 60 days later on 26 November 1630 in Segesvár. On 1 December 1630, George I Rákóczi was elected as new Prince of Transylvania by the Transylvanian state parliament.

== Sources ==
- Balogh, Judit (2012). "Bethlen István". In Gujdár, Noémi; Szatmáry, Nóra (eds.). Magyar királyok nagykönyve: Uralkodóink, kormányzóink és az erdélyi fejedelmek életének és tetteinek képes története [Encyclopedia of the Kings of Hungary: An Illustrated History of the Life and Deeds of Our Monarchs, Regents and the Princes of Transylvania] (in Hungarian). Reader's Digest. pp. 216–218. ISBN 978-963-289-214-6.
- Péter, Katalin (1994). "The Golden Age of the Principality (1606–1660)". In Köpeczi, Béla; Barta, Gábor; Bóna, István; Makkai, László; Szász, Zoltán; Borus, Judit (eds.). History of Transylvania. Akadémiai Kiadó. pp. 301–358. ISBN 963-05-6703-2.

Stephen Bethlen House of Bethlen Born: 1582
Preceded by Catherine of Brandenburg	Prince of Transylvania; 1630–1630	Succeeded by George I Rákóczi
