= Lists of political office-holders in Transylvania =

Coat of arms of the Grand Principality of Transylvania (19th century).

These are lists of political office-holders in Transylvania, from the 10th century, until 1867.

- Count of the Székelys – royal officials appointed from the first half of the 13th century to the second half of the 15th century to lead the Székelys independently of the voivodes.
  - List of counts of the Székelys
- Duke of Transylvania – members of the royal family bearing the title duke in the 13th and 14th centuries
  - List of dukes of Transylvania
- Voivode of Transylvania – great officials of the realm appointed by the monarchs to administer parts of Transylvania (includes a list of the sovereigns appointing them)
  - List of voivodes of Transylvania (12th–16th century)
- Kings of the Eastern Hungarian Kingdom under Ottoman suzerainty: John Zápolya (1526–1540) and John Sigismund Zápolya (1540–1570)
- Prince of Transylvania – monarchs of the Principality of Transylvania (1570–1711) under Ottoman suzerainty
  - List of princes of Transylvania (1570–1711)
    - List of princesses consort of Transylvania (1570–1711)
- During the (Grand) Principality of Transylvania (1711–1867), the title of "Prince(ss) of Transylvania" (since 1765 "Grand Prince(ss)") was connected to the Habsburg kings and queens of Hungary until 1804, when it was added to the Grand title of the emperor of Austria. In practice, administration was performed by the Governor of Transylvania, a viceroy appointed by the Habsburg monarchs between 1691 and 1867:
  - List of governors of Transylvania (includes a list of the sovereigns appointing them)
- List of chancellors of Transylvania (1556–1867), appointed during both the Ottoman and Habsburg eras of the Principality of Transylvania
