= Gabriel Bethlen =

Prince of Transylvania

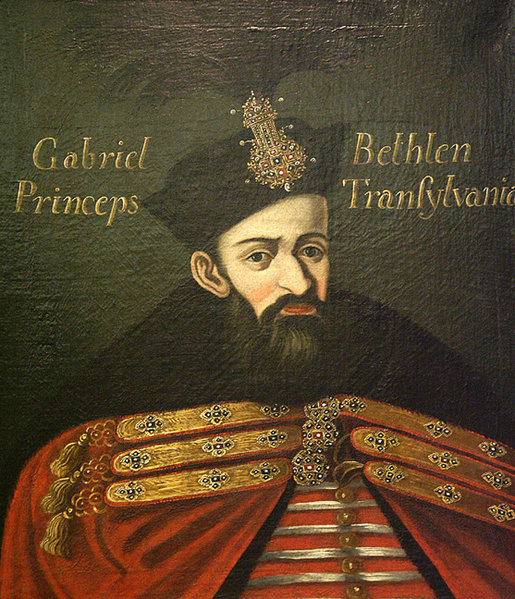

King of Hungary
- Reign: 25 August 1620 – 31 December 1621
- Predecessor: Matthias II
- Successor: Ferdinand II

Prince of Transylvania
- Reign: October 1613 – 15 November 1629
- Predecessor: Gabriel Báthory
- Successor: Catherine

Duke of Opole
- Reign: 1622 – 1625
- Predecessor: Sigismund Báthory
- Successor: Władysław Vasa
- Born: 1580; Marosillye, Principality of Transylvania
- Died: 15 November 1629 (aged 49); Gyulafehérvár, Principality of Transylvania
- Spouse: Catherine of Brandenburg
Names
- Gabriel Bethlen de Iktár
- Family: Bethlen
- Religion: Calvinist

Gabriel Bethlen (Hungarian: Bethlen Gábor; 1580 – 15 November 1629) was Prince of Transylvania from 1613 to 1629 and Duke of Opole from 1622 to 1625. He was also King-elect of Hungary from 1620 to 1621, but he never took control of the whole kingdom. Bethlen, supported by the Ottomans, led his Calvinist principality against the Habsburgs and their Catholic allies.

== Early life ==
Gabriel was the elder of the two sons of Farkas Bethlen de Iktár and Druzsiána Lázár de Szárhegy. Gabriel was born in his father's estate, Marosillye (now Ilia in Romania), in 1580. Farkas Bethlen was a Hungarian nobleman who lost his ancestral estate, Iktár (now Ictar-Budinț in Romania), due to the Ottoman occupation of the central territories of the Kingdom of Hungary. Stephen Báthory, Prince of Transylvania, granted Marosillye to him and made him captain-general of the principality. Druzsiána Lázár was descended from a Székely noble family. Both Farkas Bethlen and his wife died in 1591, leaving their two sons, Gabriel and Stephen, orphaned.

The brothers were put under the guardianship of their maternal uncle, András Lázár de Szárhegy. They lived in the Lázár Castle in Szárhegy in Székely Land (now Lăzarea in Romania) for years. Gabriel's court historian, Gáspár Bojti Veres, described Lázár as a "grumpy and fierce" soldier who did not care much about their formal education.

According Gabriel's first extant letter (from 1593), Sigismund Báthory, Prince of Transylvania, seized the brothers' estates "at the word of many coaxing people" without paying a compensation to them in 1591 or 1592, but a "few primary kinsmen" convinced the prince to offer restitution or other landed property to them. Gabriel also mentioned in the letter that he decided to visit the prince's court in Gyulafehérvár (now Alba Iulia in Romania).

== Career ==
=== Beginnings ===
Modern historians try to reconstruct the major events of Gabriel's youth based on sources (primarily memoirs and letters) completed decades later, because only two documents written between 1593 and 1602 mentioned him. One of the later sources is Gabriel's own letter from 1628, in which he stated that Stephen Bocskai had raised him and "placed great credence" in him. Gabriel also stated that Bocskai was his "kin". Another important source was written by Gabriel's retainer, Pál Háportoni Forró, who stated that Gabriel had held "great and honorable offices" and performed "the greatly laborious duties of emissary" in his youth. Based on these sources, modern historians assume that Bocskai boosted Gabriel's career in Sigismund Báthory's court, but no contemporaneous document mentioned his presence in the prince's retinue.

Sigismund Báthory joined the anti-Ottoman Holy League of Pope Clement VIII and broke into Ottoman territory in the summer of 1595. According to historian József Barcza, Gabriel gained his first direct experience of warfare fighting against the Ottomans in the Battle of Giurgiu in Wallachia in 1595. After a series of Ottoman victories, Báthory abdicated in return for the Silesian duchies of Opole and Racibórz in 1597, enabling the commissioners of the Holy Roman Emperor, Rudolph (who was also king of Royal Hungary) to take possession of Transylvania.

=== Anarchy ===
Sigismund Báthory regretted his abdication and returned to Transylvania in August 1598. He sent Bocskai to Prague to start negotiations with Rudolph in January 1599. According to a scholarly theory, Gabriel Bethlen accompanied Bocskai to Prague. Historian József Barcza also says, Gabriel must have realized around that time that the Habsburg monarchs were unable to defend Transylvania against the Ottomans. Gabriel himself stated that he visited Prague in the retinue of Sigismund Báthory at an unspecified date.

Gabriel supported Andrew Báthory, who mounted the throne with Polish assistance after Sigismund again abdicated in 1599. Michael the Brave, Prince of Wallachia, broke into Transylvania and defeated Andrew in the Battle of Sellenberk (at present-day Șelimbăr in Romania) on 8 October 1599. Gabriel received wounds in the battle and his wounds healed slowly. Michael the Brave was expelled from Transylvania by Rudolph's commander, Giorgio Basta. During the following years, Transylvania was regularly pillaged both by Basta's unpaid mercenaries, and by Ottoman and Crimean Tatar troops. Gabriel and his brother, Stephen, divided their inherited estates, with Gabriel receiving Marosillye. Their agreement also refers to the anarchic situation, mentioning the possibility that "either pagan or some godless prince or the governor" would seize Gabriel's property.

Gabriel joined the Transylvanian noblemen who rose up against Basta. Sigismund Báthory (who had again returned to Transylvania) granted Gabriel and his brother landed property in Arad County in June 1602. The army of the rebellious noblemen was annihilated near Tövis (now Teiuș in Romania) on 2 July 1602. After the battle, he swam over the Maros River and fled to Temesvár in the Ottoman Empire (now Timișoara in Romania). He forged letters which suggested that the leading Transylvanian noblemen supported Moses Székely to persuade the Ottomans to support Székely, according to the contemporaneous Ambrus Somogyi. When Székely broke into Transylvania in March 1603, Gabriel was the commander of his vanguard. Székelys' troops conquered most fortresses along the Maros and laid siege to Gyulafehérvár. During the siege, the princely palace burned. Székely was installed as prince in May, but Radu Șerban, Prince of Wallachia, annihilated his army near Barcarozsnyó (now Râșnov in Romania) on 17 July. Székely was killed in the battlefield, and his supporters (among them Gabriel) fled to the Ottoman Empire.

The Transylvanian refugees started to regard Gabriel as their leader. They sent a delegation to Constantinople in August, asking the permission of the Ottoman grand vizier to elect Gabriel prince and seeking Ottoman assistance to their return to Transylvania. The grand vizier granted the permission, but one of the refugees, Boldizsár Szilvási, prevented Gabriel's election, pointing out that a prince could not be elected by a group of refugees, but by the Diet of Transylvania.

=== Bocskai's supporter ===
Gabriel decided to persuade the wealthy Stephen Bocskai to rise up against Rudolph's commissioners. After royal troops attacked the refugees' camp near Temesvár on 13 September 1604, rumours about the capture of a secret correspondence between Bethlen and Bocskai began circulating. Fearing reprisals, Bocskai withdrew to his fortress at Sólyomkő (now Şoimeni in Romania) and make preparations to resist. He hired irregular Hajdú troops and defeated a royal army on 15 October.

Bocskai took possession of Kassa (now Košice in Slovakia) on 11 November. Soon after, Gabriel gave the ahidnâme (or charter) in which the Ottoman Sultan, Ahmed I, styled Bocskai as prince of Transylvania. The delegates of the noblemen and the Székelys elected Bocskai prince on 21 February 1605. According to a letter of Bethlen, Bocskai ordered him to capture "certain castles", for which he had to postpone his marriage in May.

Gabriel finally married his bride, Zsuzsanna Károlyi, in August 1605. Bocskai granted the domain of Vajdahunyad (now Hunedoara in Romania) to him. The prince also made him the perpetual ispán (or head) of Hunyad County.

Bethlen was a Calvinist. He helped György Káldy, a Jesuit, translate and print the Bible. He composed hymns and from 1625, employed Johannes Thesselius as kapellmeister.

=== Prince of Transylvania ===
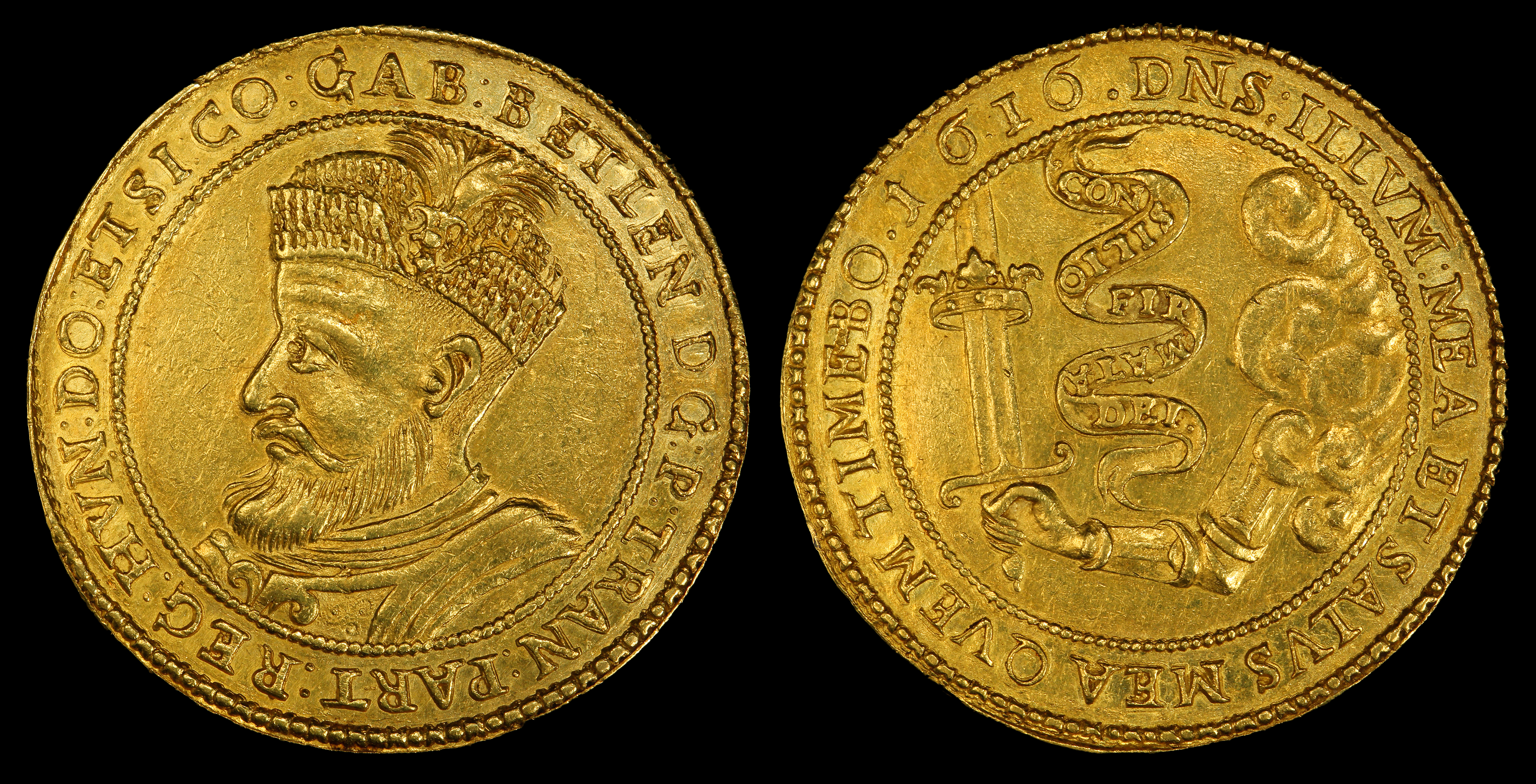
1616 ten-ducat gold coin depicting Gabriel Bethlen as Prince of Transylvania

In 1605, Bethlen supported Stephen Bocskay and his successor Gabriel Báthory (1608–1613). Bethlen later fell out with Báthory and fled to the Ottoman Empire.

In 1613, after Báthory was murdered, the Ottomans installed Bethlen as Prince of Transylvania and this was endorsed on 13 October 1613 by the Transylvanian Diet at Kolozsvár (Cluj-Napoca). In 1615, after the Peace of Tyrnau, Bethlen was recognised by Matthias, Holy Roman Emperor.

Bethlen's rule was one of enlightened absolutism. He developed mines and industry and nationalised many branches of Transylvania's foreign trade. His agents bought goods at fixed prices and sold them abroad at profit. In his capital, in Gyulafehérvár (Alba Iulia), Bethlen built a grand new palace. Bethlen was a patron of the arts and the Calvinist church, giving hereditary nobility to Protestant priests. Bethlen also encouraged learning by founding the Bethlen Gabor College, encouraging the enrollment of Hungarian academics and teachers and sending Transylvanian students to the Protestant universities of England, the Dutch Republic, and the Protestant principalities of Germany. He also ensured the right of serfs' children to be educated.

=== Anti-Habsburg insurrection ===
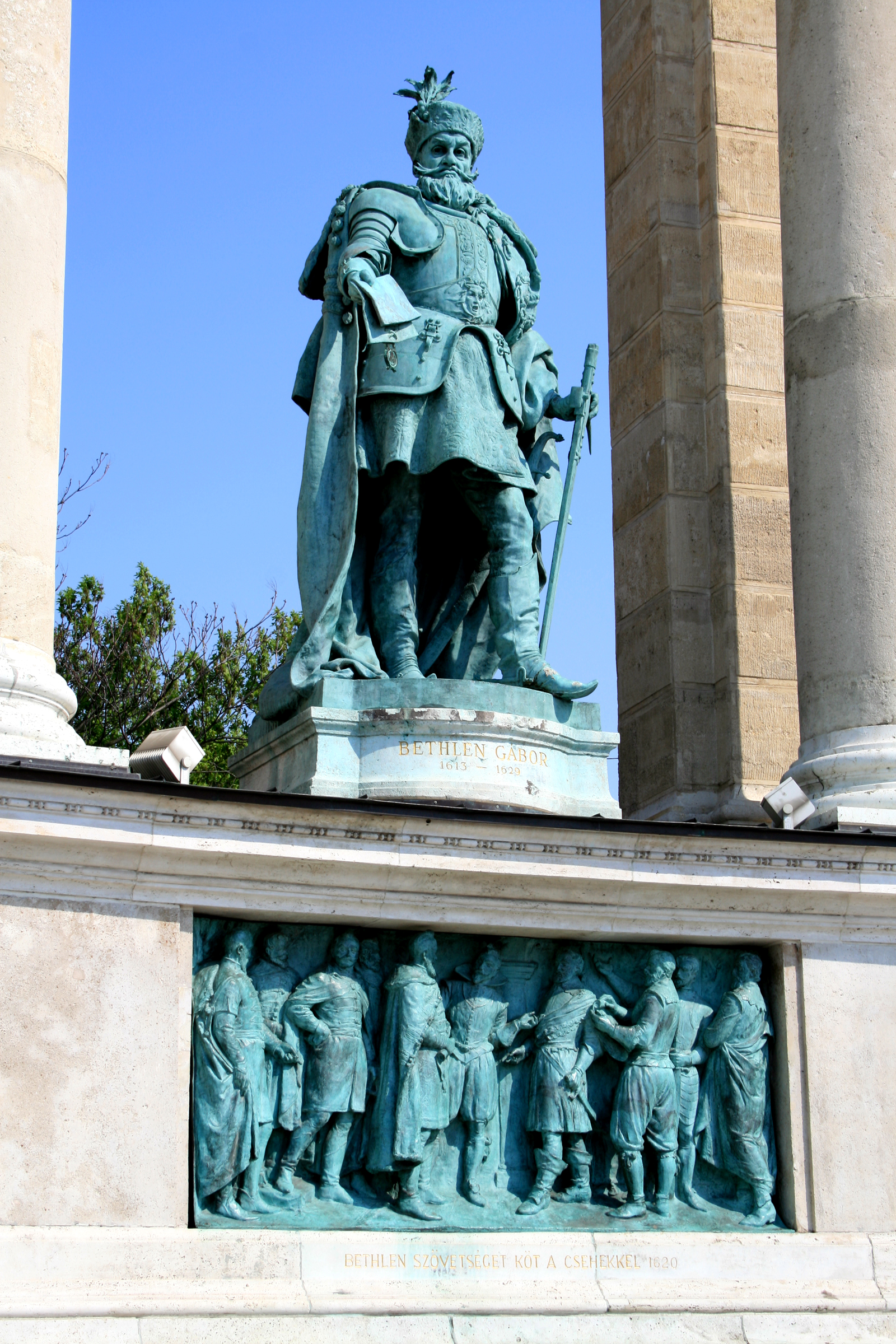
Statue of Gábor Bethlen, by György Vastagh, Heroes' Square, Budapest, Hungary

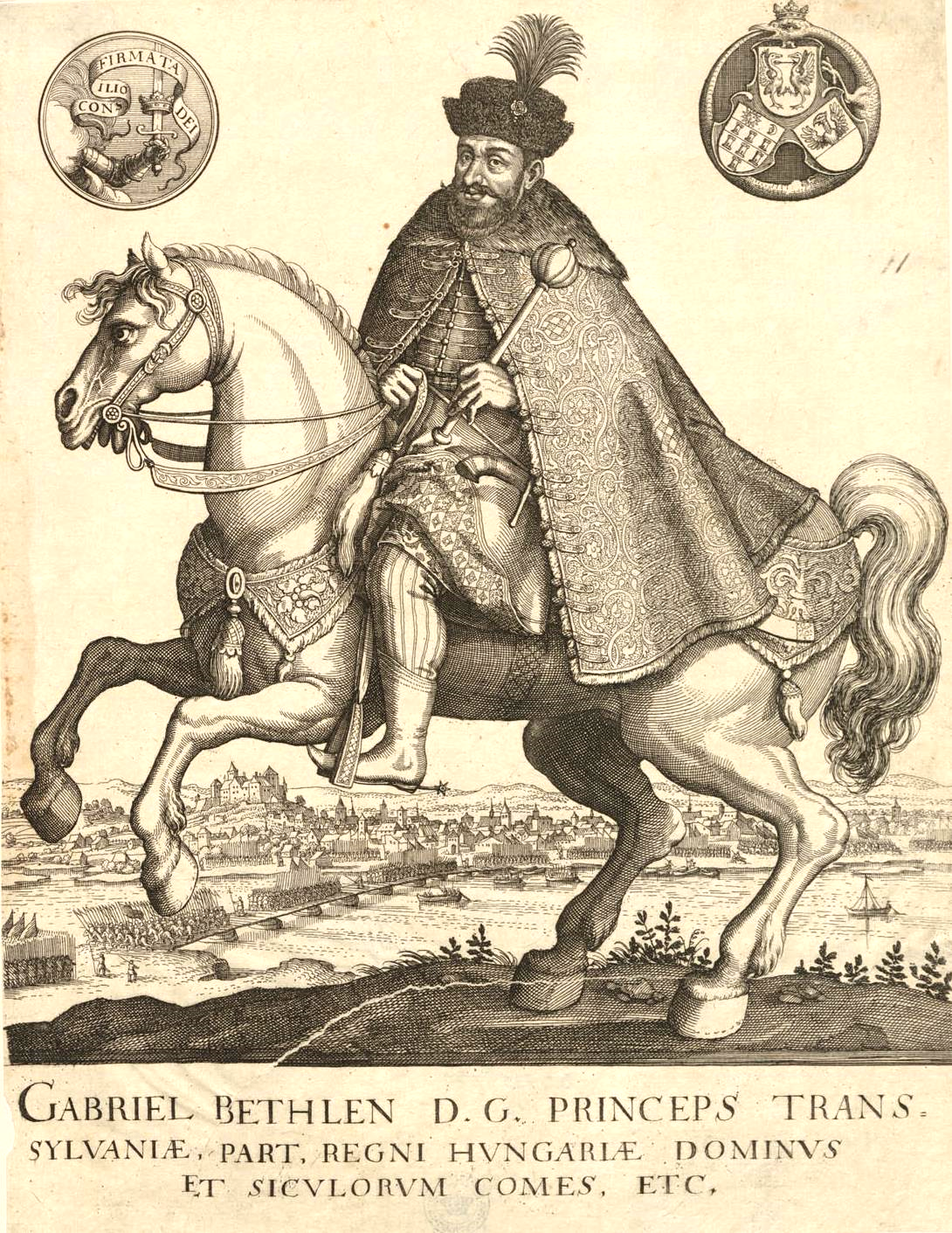
Bethlen on horseback (print)

Bethlen maintained an efficient standing army of mercenaries. While keeping relations with the Sublime Porte (the Ottoman Empire), he sought to gain lands to the north and west. During the Thirty Years' War, he attacked the Habsburgs of Royal Hungary (1619–1626). Bethlen opposed the autocracy of the Habsburgs; persecution of Protestants in Royal Hungary; the violation of the Peace of Vienna of 1606; and Habsburg alliances with the Ottomans and George Drugeth (1633-1661), the captain of Upper Hungary.

In August 1619, Bethlen invaded Royal Hungary. In September, he took Kassa (Košice) where Protestant supporters declared him the leader of Hungary and protector of Protestants. He gained control of Upper Hungary (present-day Slovakia). In September 1619, after refusing to convert to Calvinism, the Jesuits Marko Križevcanin, Stephen Pongracz and Melchior Grodeczki were martyred under Bethlen's authority." The three were later canonized by the Catholic Church.

In October 1619, Bethlen took Pressburg (Pozsony, today's Bratislava), where the Palatine of Hungary ceded the Holy Crown of Hungary. However, Bethlen, together with Jindřich Matyáš of Thurn-Valsassina, count of the Moravian and Czech estates, did not take Vienna and, in November, the forces of George Drugeth and Polish mercenaries (lisowczycy) won the Battle of Humenné and forced Bethlen to leave Austria and Upper Hungary.

Bethlen negotiated for peace at Pressburg, Kassa (now Košice) and Besztercebánya (now Banská Bystrica). In January 1620, without the Czechs, Bethlen received 13 counties in the east of Royal Hungary. On 20 August 1620, he was elected King of Hungary at the Diet of Besztercebánya and in September 1620, war with the Habsburgs resumed.

After defeating the Czechs on 8 November 1620 at the Battle of White Mountain, Ferdinand II persecuted the Protestant nobility of Bohemia. Between May and June 1621, he regained Pressburg and the central mining towns. Bethlen again sued for peace and on 31 December 1621, the Peace of Nikolsburg was made. Bethlen renounced his royal title on the condition that Hungarian Protestants were given religious freedoms and were included in a general diet within six months. Bethlen was given the title of Imperial Prince (of Hungarian Transylvania), seven counties around the Upper Tisza River and the fortresses of Tokaj, Munkács (now Mukacheve), and Ecsed (Nagyecsed), and a duchy in Silesia.

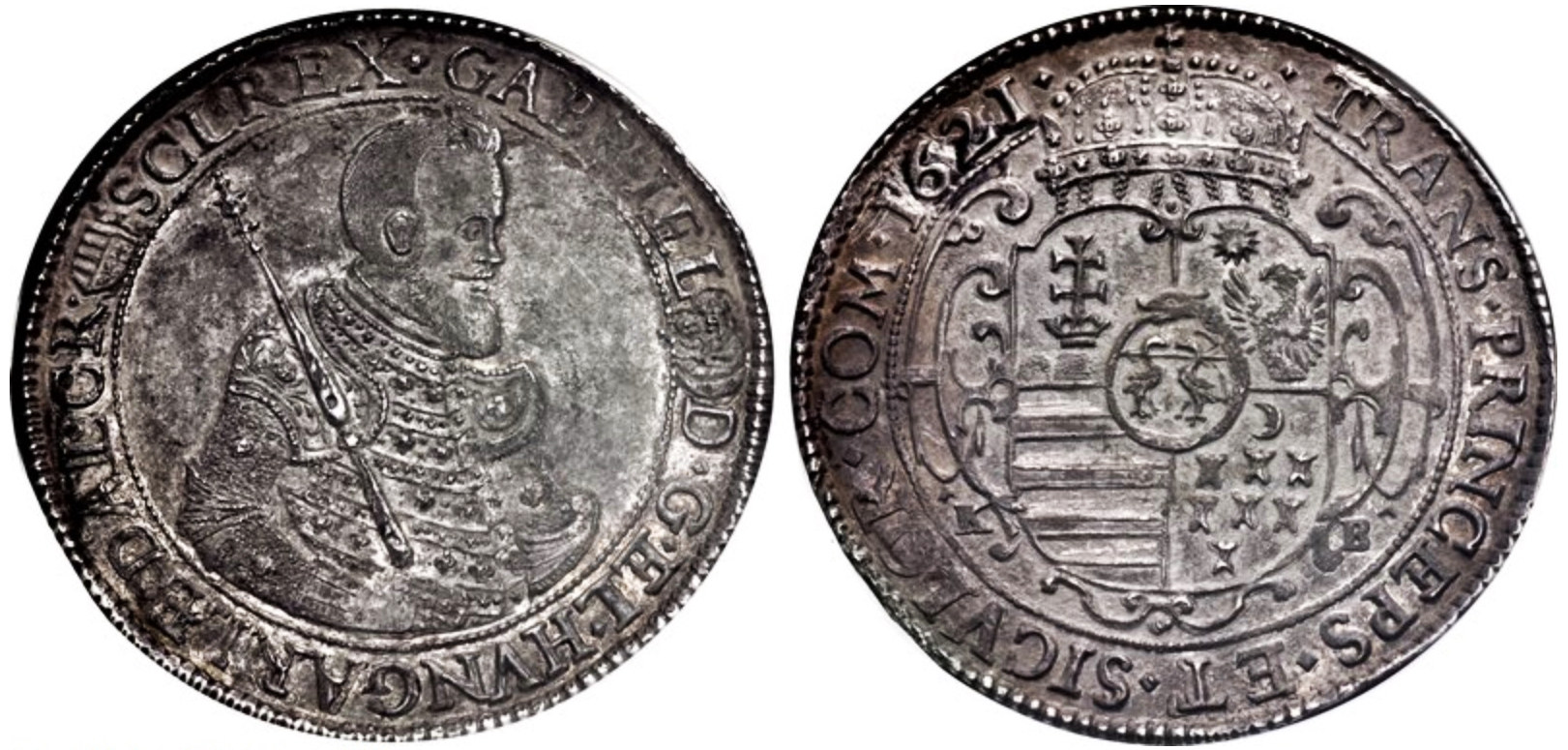
Transylvanian Thaler of Gabriel Bethlen showing his portrait and coat of arms (1621)

In 1623 - 1624 and 1626, Bethlen, allied with the anti-Habsburg Protestants, made campaigns against Ferdinand in Upper Hungary. The first campaign ended with the Peace of Vienna (1624), the second by the Peace of Pressburg (1626). After the second campaign, Bethlen offered as rapprochement to the court of Vienna an alliance against the Ottomans and his marriage to an archduchess of Austria, but Ferdinand rejected his overtures. On his return from Vienna, Bethlen wed Catherine of Brandenburg, the daughter of John Sigismund, Elector of Brandenburg. His brother-in-law was Gustavus Adolphus of Sweden.

Principality of Gabriel Bethlen

== Death ==
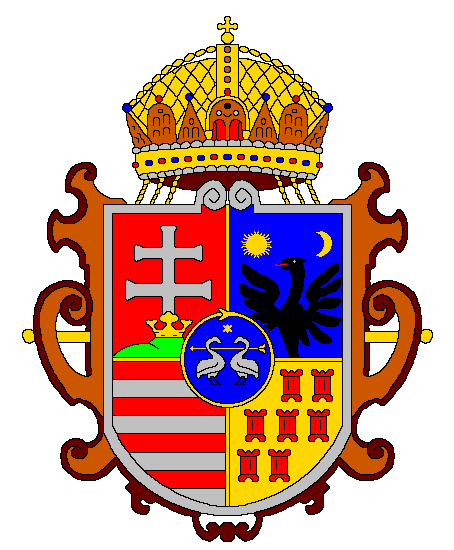
Coat of arms of Bethlen

Bethlen died on 15 November 1629. His second wife, Catherine of Brandenburg, became Princess Regnant of Transylvania.

His first wife, Zsuzsanna Károlyi, had died in 1622.

Bethlen's state correspondence survives as a historical document.

== Ancestors ==
Ancestors of Gabriel Bethlen

16. Domokos Bethlen de Iktár
8. Peter Bethlen de Iktár
17. Christina (from unknown family)
4. Gabriel Bethlen de Iktár
2. Farkas Bethlen de Iktár (+1590)
5. unknown woman from the Kinizsi family
1. Gabriel Bethlen de Iktár
24. András Lázár de Szárhegy
12. János Lázár de Szentanna
6. Stephen Lázár de Szárhegy
26. György Apafi de Apanagyfalu
13. Klára Apafi de Apanagyfalu
27. Anna Bánffy de Losoncz
3. Druzsianna Lázár de Szárhegy
28. András Bogáthy de Bogáth
14. János Bogáthy de Bogáth
7. Borbála Bogáthy de Bogáth
30. László Bánffy de Losoncz
15. Magdolna Bánffy de Losoncz (+1545)
31. Anna Dobokai

== See also ==
- Magna Curia

Gabriel Bethlen House of Bethlen
Regnal titles
Preceded by Gabriel Báthory	Prince of Transylvania; 1613–1629	Succeeded by Catherine of Brandenburg
Preceded by Ferdinand II	King of Hungary contested by Ferdinand II; 1620–1621	Succeeded by Ferdinand II
Preceded by Sigismund Báthory	Duke of Opole; 1622–1625	Succeeded by Wladislaus IV of Poland
