= Prince of Transylvania =

- Erdélyi fejedelem

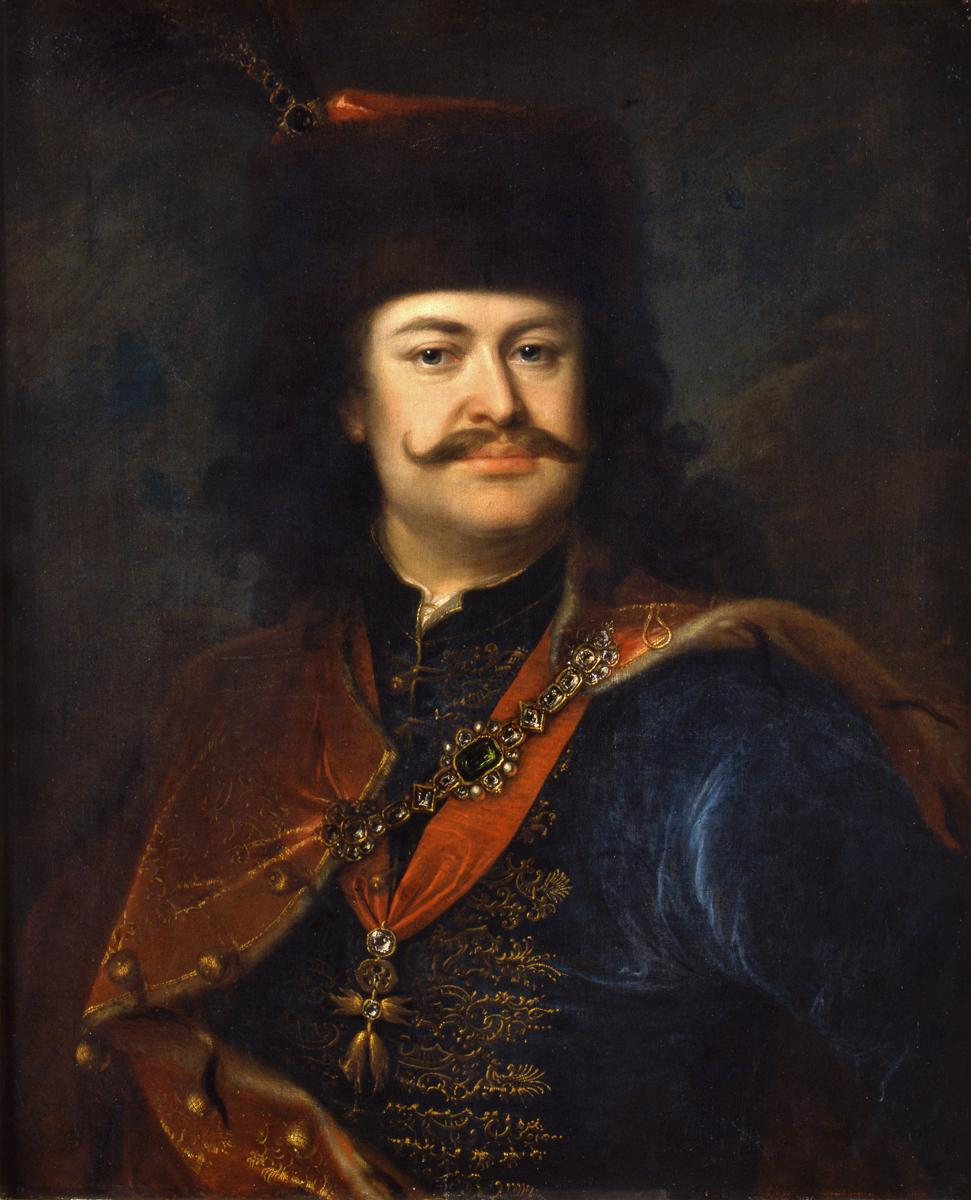
- Last to reign Francis II Rákóczi; 8 July 1704 – 21 February 1711

Details
- First monarch: John Sigismund Zápolya
- Last monarch: Francis II Rákóczi
- Formed: 16 August 1570
- Abolished: 21 February 1711
- Residences: Princely Palace, Gyulafehérvár (now Alba Iulia, Romania)
- Appointer: Diet of Transylvania

The Prince of Transylvania (Hungarian: erdélyi fejedelem, German: Fürst von Siebenbürgen, Latin: princeps Transsylvaniae, Romanian: principele Transilvaniei) was the head of state of the Principality of Transylvania from the late-16th century until the mid-18th century. John Sigismund Zápolya was the first to adopt the title in 1570, but its use became stable only from 1576.

== Origins ==
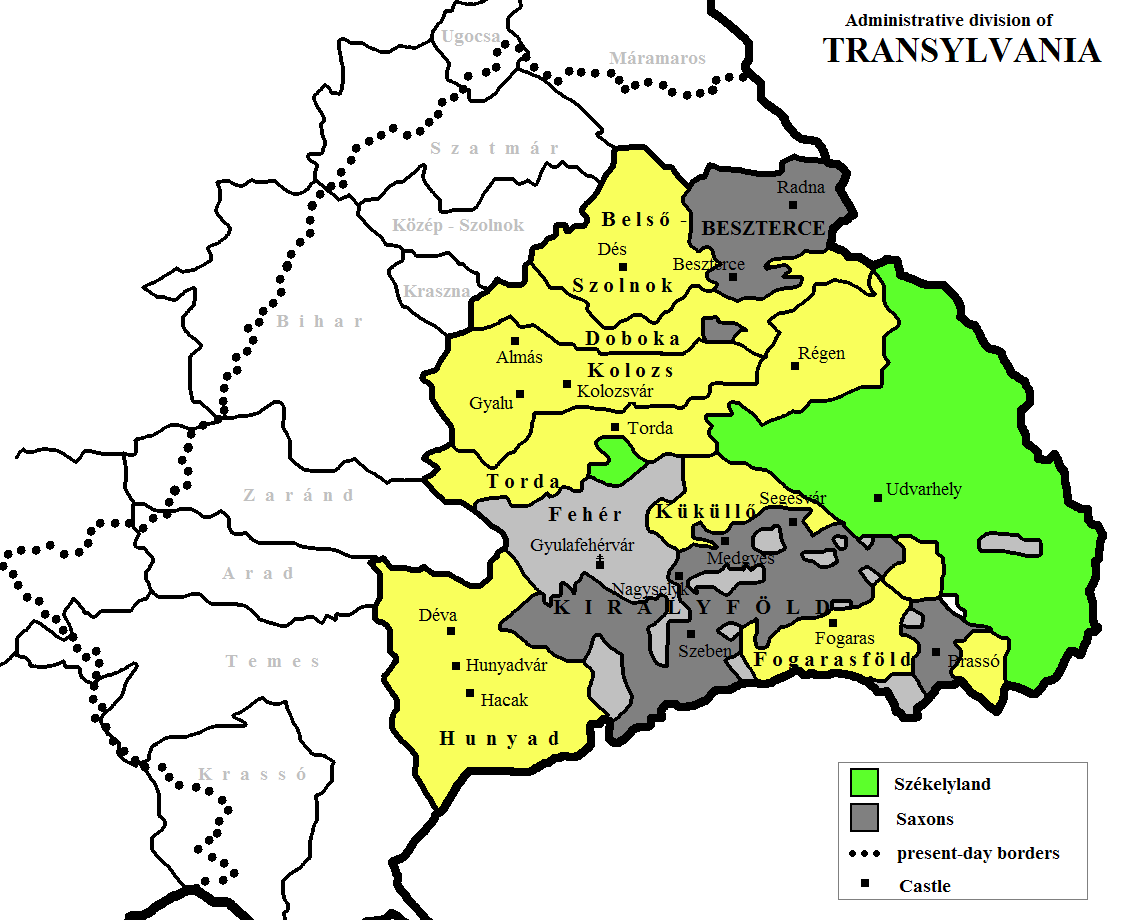
Administrative division of Transylvania in the early 16th century

The integration of Transylvania into the newly established Kingdom of Hungary began around 1003. The province became subject to intensive colonization, leading to the arrival and settlement of colonists of diverse origin, including the Hungarian-speaking Székelys and the Ethnic Germans. The territory of Transylvania was divided for administrative reasons within territorial units known as "counties" and "seats".

The seven Transylvanian counties (Doboka, Fehér, Hunyad, Kolozs, Küküllő, Szolnok, and Torda County) were institutions primarily run by local noblemen. However, their heads or ispáns were subject to the authority of a higher official, the voivode who was appointed by the kings of Hungary. The Voivode of Transylvania had a number of administrative, military and judicial responsibilities. For instance, joint general assemblies of the seven counties were convoked and headed by the voivode or his deputy, customarily at Torda (today Turda). These assemblies primarily functioned as courts-of-justice, but judges for the counties were also elected by them.

Saxon sees and districts in 17th century Transylvania.

Instead of counties, the Transylvanian Saxon community was primarily organized into seats and districts. They were independent of the authority of the voivodes. In 1469, King Matthias Corvinus of Hungary authorized all Saxons' seats to elect their own heads. Seven years later, the same monarch set up the "Saxon University" unifying all Saxon seats and districts in Transylvania, which was headed by the elected major of Nagyszeben (German: Hermannstadt, Romanian: Sibiu). Initially, the Székelys were likewise independent of the authority of the voivodes, since they were led by their own count, an official appointed by the sovereign.

Although the Saxons and the Székelys endeavoured to preserve their direct connection to the monarchs, "the first institutional contacts between the nobility, the Székelys and the Saxons were established through the voivode" from the early 14th century. For instance, the representatives of the Saxons and the Székelys were often present at the general assemblies of the noblemen headed by the voivodes. Furthermore, voivodes were also appointed Count of the Székelys by the monarch from the middle of the 15th century, thus the two offices were united by custom. In contrast with the representatives of the noblemen, the Saxons and the Székelys, Romanian cneazes were only twice (in 1291 and in 1355) invited to the general assemblies.

The leaders of the noblemen from the seven counties, the Saxons, and the Székelys formed an alliance against "all internal and external threat to the province" in the days of the Budai Nagy Antal Revolt in 1437. This formal alliance of the "Three Nations of Transylvania" was confirmed in 1459, aimed primarily against Michael Szilágyi, the regent-governor of the Kingdom of Hungary. During the rebellion of peasants led by György Dózsa in 1514, Voivode John Zápolya convoked the assembly of the Three Nations.

=== End of the independent Kingdom of Hungary ===
In 1526, in the Battle of Mohács, the Ottoman Empire defeated the royal army of Hungary and killed King Louis II. The Ottomans then withdrew.

The throne was claimed by Louis' brother-in-law Archduke Ferdinand of Austria, and by John Zápolya, both backed by factions of Hungarian magnates. Ferdinand drove John out of Hungary, whereupon John offered allegiance to Ottoman Sultan Suleiman the Magnificent in return for support. Suleiman invaded Austria while John regained his throne. Suleiman was repulsed from Austria, and by a treaty in 1538, Ferdinand became King of Hungary, holding the western parts, while John became King, holding the eastern parts, including Transylvania (called by historians the "Eastern Hungarian Kingdom").

Thus from being a fully sovereign kingdom, Hungary had become either a possession of the House of Habsburg or an Ottoman vassal state.

=== Separation of the Principality of Transylvania ===
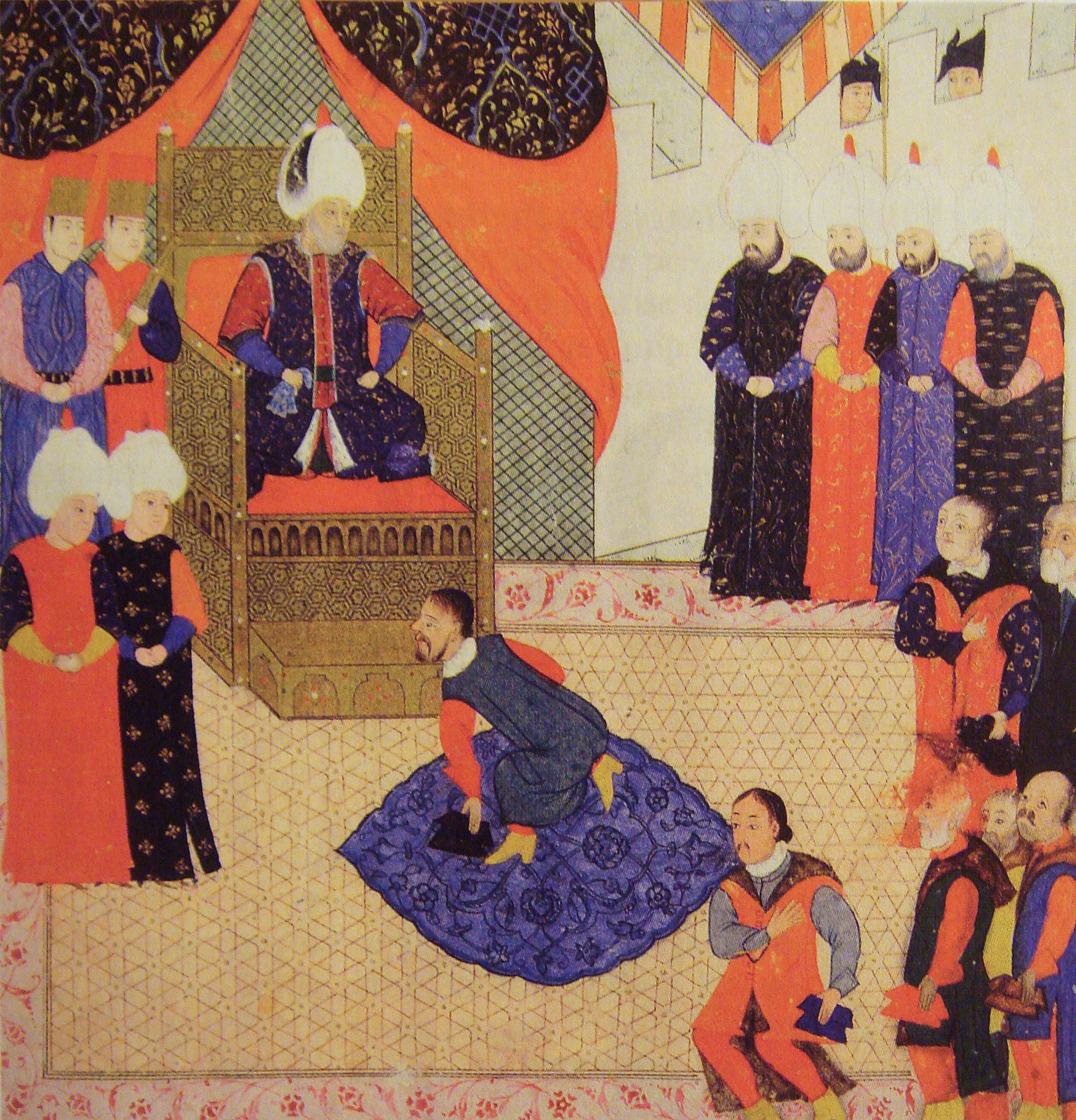
King John Sigismund of Hungary with Suleiman the Magnificent in 1556.

In 1538, John named Ferdinand his successor as King. But he had a son, John Sigismund Zápolya, just before he died in 1540. The Hungarian Diet elected him King as John II Sigismund, and when Ferdinand invaded, the Regent Bishop Martinuzzi called on Suleiman to protect his vassal. Suleiman drove out Ferdinand, then put central Hungary under direct Turkish rule. He allocated Transylvania and eastern Royal Hungary to John II Sigismund.

In 1551, Bishop Martinuzzi arranged for John II Sigismund to abdicate his royal title in favor of Ferdinand, in return for being recognized as vassal lord of the "East Hungarian" lands.

All the territories of the Kingdom of Hungary which had remained free of direct Ottoman occupation were thus reunited under Ferdinand's rule in 1551. But Ottoman attacks continued, and Ferdinand could not protect "Eastern Hungary". In 1556, the Diet invited "King John's son" (that is, John II Sigismund) and his mother to resume the government of the territories east of the Tisza. John II Sigismund continued to style himself "elected king" of Hungary until 1570.

In 1570, John II Sigismund again abdicated as King in favor of Ferdinand's successor, Emperor Maximilian II. This was expressed in the treaty of Speyer. John II Sigismund adopted the new style "Prince of Transylvania and Lord of parts of Hungary".

John Sigismund's successor, Stephen Báthory, however, adopted the title the one-time royal governors of Transylvania used and styled himself voivode. Furthermore, he secretly swore allegiance to King Maximilian I of Hungary. Stephen Báthory only adopted the style Prince when he was elected King of Poland in 1576. Upon his death in 1586, his princely title was inherited by his nephew, Sigismund Báthory. The new style of the rulers of Transylvania and the Partium was also confirmed by King Maximilian I's successor, Emperor Rudolph II on January 28, 1595.

== The prince and his prerogatives ==
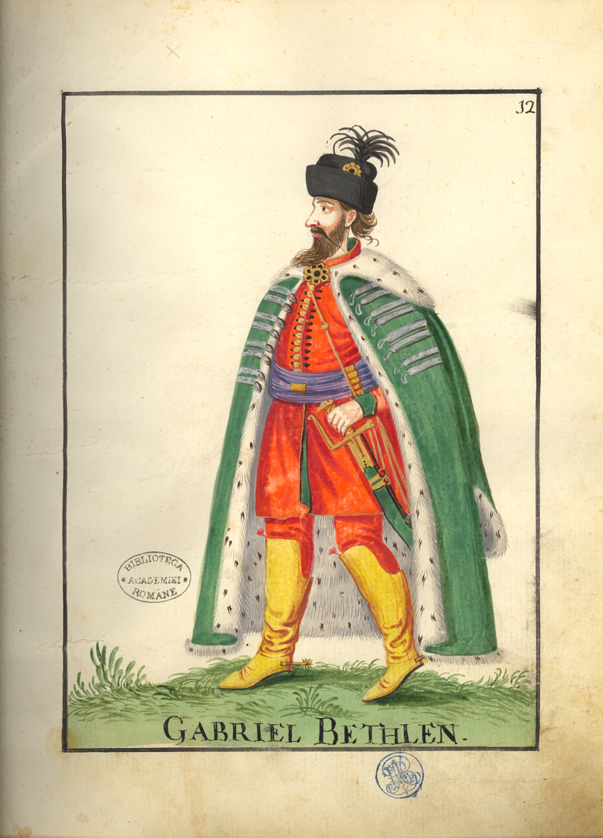
Gabriel Bethlen

=== Style and titles ===
Transylvanian monarchs used the following style and titles: "His Excellency, by the grace of God, Prince of Transylvania, Lord of parts of Hungary, and Count of the Székelys". In addition, Sigismund Báthory adopted the title of "Prince of Wallachia and Moldavia" in 1595.

=== International status ===
From 1570 to 1699, the princes of Transylvania were not recognized as independent monarchs. At times they acknowledged Ottoman suzerainty, and at other times accepted the rule of the Kingdom of Hungary. According to the teachings of the Hanafi school of Islamic jurisprudence, Transylvania was part of the "House of Agreement" (Dâr al ahd'), that is a territory with a transitory status between the lands fully integrated in the Ottoman Empire and independent states. Accordingly, when ascending the throne each prince received an official document from the sultan which described the prince's rights and obligations. These documents or ahidnâmes confirmed the right of the Transylvanian estates to elect their princes freely, "guaranteed the territorial integrity of the principality", and promised military assistance to the Prince in case of invasion by his enemies. On the other hand, the princes were obliged to pay a yearly tribute and to assist the Ottomans in their military operations.

== End of the institution ==
After the Rákóczi's War of Independence the princes were effectively replaced with governors. The last prince Francis II Rákóczi spent the rest of his life in exile.

== See also ==
- List of princes of Transylvania
- List of rulers of Transylvania
- List of consorts of Transylvania
