= Mălâncrav =

Mălâncrav may refer to the following entities of Romania:

- Mălâncrav (village)
- Mălâncrav (river)
