= Michael I Apafi =

- Prince of Transylvania
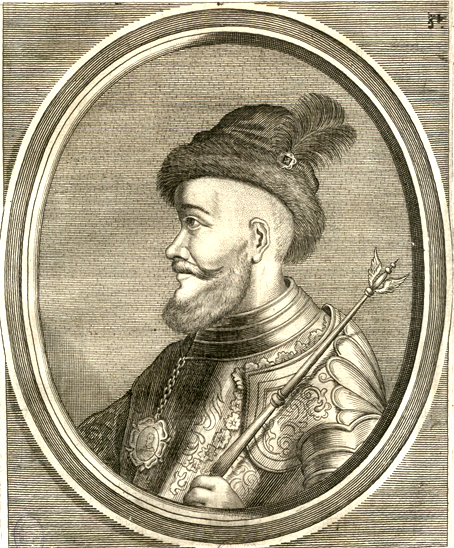
- Portrait of Michael Apafi by Cornelis Meyssens

Prince of Transylvania
- Reign: 1661 – 1690
- Predecessor: John Kemény
- Successor: Emeric Thököly
- Born: 1632; Ebesfalva, Principality of Transylvania (now Dumbrăveni, Romania)
- Died: 15 April 1690 (aged 57–58); Fogoras, Principality of Transylvania (now Făgăraş, Romania)
- Spouse: Anna Bornemisza
- Issue: Michael II Apafi
- House: Apafi

Michael Apafi (Hungarian: Apafi Mihály; 3 November 1632 – 15 April 1690) was Prince of Transylvania from 1661 to his death.

== Background ==
The Principality of Transylvania emerged after the disintegration of the medieval Kingdom of Hungary in the second half of the 16th century. The principality included Transylvania proper and other territories to the east of the river Tisza, known as Partium. The princes of Transylvania paid a yearly tribute to the Ottoman sultans and could not conduct an independent foreign policy. They also maintained a special relationship with the Habsburg rulers of Royal Hungary (the realm developing on the northern and western territories of medieval Hungary), theoretically acknowledging that their principality remained a land of the Holy Crown of Hungary.

== Early life ==
Born in Ebesfalva (now Dumbrăveni in Romania) on 3 November 1632, Michael was the son of György Apafi of Apanagyfalva and Borbála Petky. György Apafi was the ispán (or head) of Küküllő County in the Principality of Transylvania. Michael's childhood and youth is almost undocumented. He grew up in a large family: his mother gave birth to six sons and five daughters. He lost his father at the age of three. His teachers were Cartesians and he studied philosophy, astronomy and mechanics. He was a passionate horologist and collector of watches. He married a Transylvanian noblewoman, Anna Bornemissza in 1650. She was related to the aristocratic Kemény and Bánffy families.

== Chaos ==
George II Rákóczi, Prince of Transylvania, invaded the Polish–Lithuanian Commonwealth without seeking the Ottoman sultan's consent in January 1657. He had concluded an agreement with King Charles X of Sweden about the partition of the Commonwealth and wanted to secure the Polish throne for himself. Rákóczi had also entered into correspondence with Count Miklós Zrínyi (or Nikola Zrinski), a prominent aristocrat in Royal Hungary, who offered the Hungarian throne to him against the Habsburg monarch, Leopold I. As a young Transylvanian nobleman, Michael Apafi accompanied Rákóczi to the Polish campaign.

The new Grand Vizier of the Ottoman Empire, Köprülü Mehmed Pasha, had set about the consolidation of the empire just months before Rákóczi's Polish campaign. He instructed Rákóczi to return from his Polish campaign several times. For Rákóczi ignored his instructions, Köprülü Mehmed ordered the Crimean Tatars to attack the Transylvanian army in Poland. Polish troops invaded Transylvania and his allies abandoned Rákóczi who was forced to sign a humiliating peace treaty, promising to pay 1.2 million florins as compensation to the Commonwealth on 22 July 1657. Rákóczi hurried back to Transylvania, leaving the bulk of his army behind. The Transylvanian troops were approaching their homeland when the Tatars ambushed and captured them on 31 July. The Tatars dragged their prisoners off to the Crimea. Apafi and the commander of the army, John Kemény, were among the captives. The Tatars demanded a ransom for the release of the Transylvanian aristocrats, but Rákóczi denied paying it from his own treasury.

Transylvania fell into chaos. Köprülü Mehmed ordered Rákóczi's deposition and an obedient Diet elected Francis Rhédey prince, but Rákóczi regained his throne early in 1658. After Rákóczi did not obey the Grand Vizier's summons, Köprülü's Ottoman and Tatar troops invaded Transylvania, destroying Gyulafehérvár (Alba Iulia) and other towns and capturing tens of thousands of prisoners in September. Köprülü withdrew his troops from the principality only after the head of the Prince's Council, Ákos Barcsay was elected prince by the Diet on 7 October. A civil war broke out, with Rákóczi seeking Leopold I's support and Barcsay urging the Ottomans to intervene. Rákóczi who was fatally wounded fighting against the Ottomans died on 7 Juny 1660, but the Ottomans soon imprisoned Barcsay to secure the collection of a large indemnity for costs of the war. The Ottomans captured Várad (Oradea) on 17 August and took possession of most of the Partium.

Apafi's former commander, John Kemény, had meanwhile returned from the Tatar captivity to Transylvania. After the Ottoman conquest of Várad, Kemény rose up against Barcsay with the remnants of Rákóczi's supporters. The Diet elected him prince on 1 January 1661. On 23 April, he also persuaded the Diet to quit Ottoman suzerainty and seek Leopold I's protection. Leopold I appointed Field Marshall Raimondo Montecuccoli to lead an army to Transylvania. Köprülü Mehmed offered a compromise to Leopold I, demanding the acknowledgement of the Ottoman conquest of Várad and of the sultans' suzerainty over Transylvania in return for appointing a new prince and stopping the punitive Ottoman military campaigns. His offer was accepted and a secret treaty confirmed the compromise.

== Reign ==
=== Ascension to throne ===
Apafi spent more than three years in captivity before his wife could raise his ransom. The sum of his ransom is unknown, but Anna Bornemissza must have converted parts of their property into cash. She sold their village of Almakerék (Mălâncrav), according to 19th-century historians. After his return to Transylvania in 1661, Apafi settled in his estates.

The Ottoman sultan Mehmed IV appointed Kuchuk Ali, Pasha (or governor) of Temeşvar Eyalet, to restore Ottoman suzerainty in Transylvania by force. Kuchuk Ali invaded the principality from the West in late June 1661. He offered the princely throne first to István Petky (a kinsman of Apafy), then to Pál Béldi, and then to István Lázár, but they refused the offer. Meanwhile, Crimean Tatars poured into the principality and joined Kuchuk Ali's troops in pillaging the countryside. The Pasha appointed Apafi as prince and Apafi did not dare to disobey. Kuchuk Ali ordered the delegates of the Three Nations to gather at a meadow near Marosvásárhely (Târgu Mureș) and to acknowledge Apafi's appointment on 14 September 1661. The Pasha demanded 250,000 florins as compensation for the costs of the war and further 50,000 florins as tribute.

John Kemény captured Kolozsvár (Cluj-Napoca), but Montecuccoli withdrew most of his troops from Transylvania after learning of Apafi's ascension to the throne on 18 September. Montecuccoli left small German mercenary troops in five Transylvanian strongholds and Apafi vainly requested Leopold I to surrender them. Apafi convened the Diet to Kleinschelken (Șeica Mică) to secure the full legitimization of his rule, because his appointment violated the constitutional principle of the free election of the princes. After he took the customary princely oath, the Diet installed him as prince on 20 November. The Diet set a fifteen-day deadline for all noblemen to acknowledge Apafi's rule, but Kemény did not obey.

Köprülü Mehmed's son, Fazıl Ahmed Pasha, who succeeded his father as grand vizier on 1 November, addressed a letter to Apafi. He assured Apafi of the protection of the Ottoman sultan, Mehmed IV, but also reminded him that he had owed his throne only to Ottoman support. Apafi sent envoys to Kemény to achieve his rival's resignation in return for an amnesty, but Kemény had the envoys captured. Kemény died fighting against an Ottoman army near Grossalisch (Seleuș) on 22 January 1662. The commander of the Ottoman army, Kuchuk Mehmed, did not leave the principality after his victory.

=== Consolidation ===
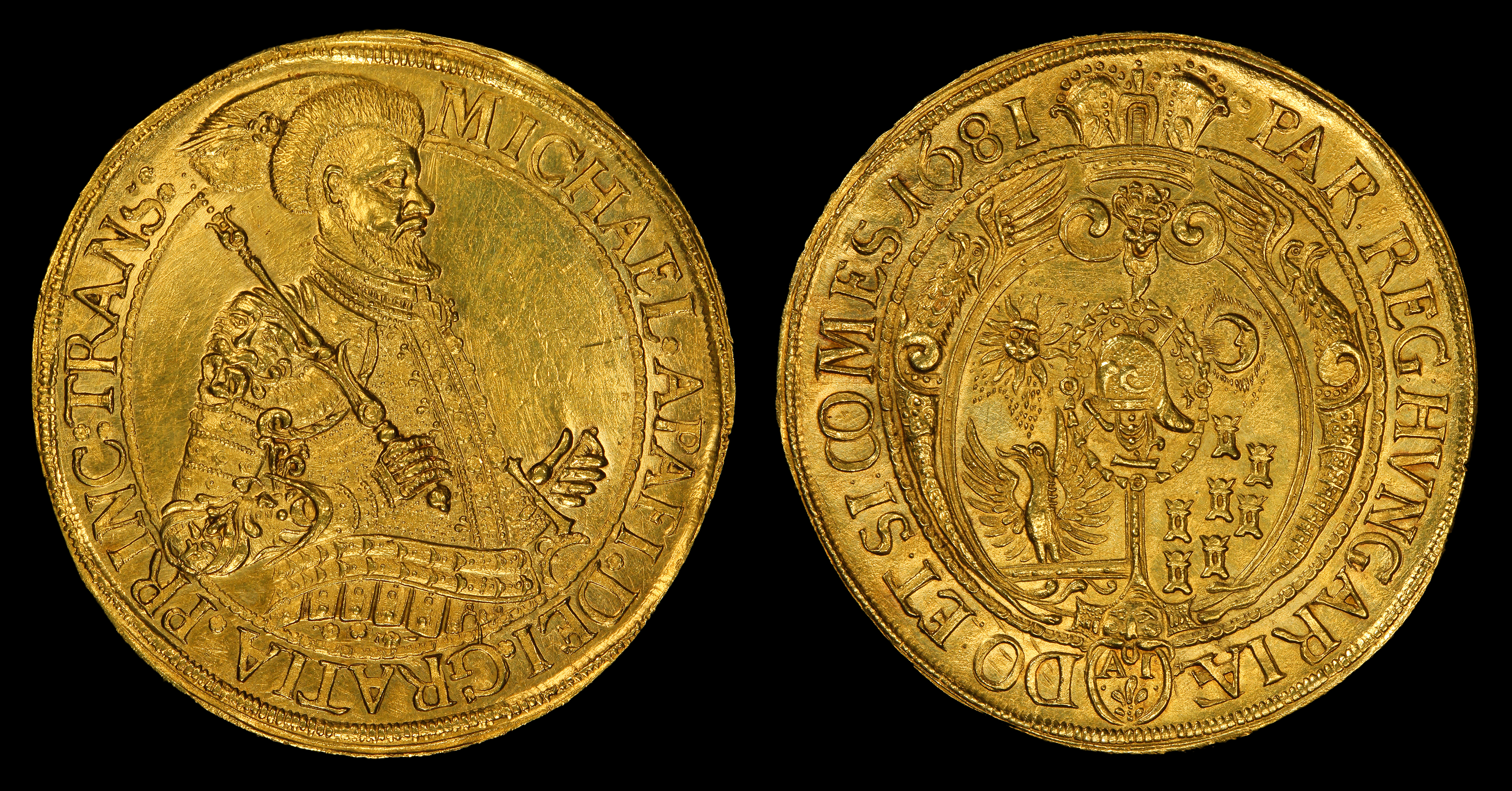
1681 25 Ducat gold coin, depicting Michael I Apafi as Prince of Transylvania

Kemény's death consolidated Apafi's position. Transylvanian noblemen hurried to pay homage to him. He did not dismiss Kemény's chancellor, János Bethlen, and made Gábor Haller his treasurer. Although Kemény's staunchest partisans sought Leopold I's support, their envoys could not exact a promise from him. The German garrison surrendered Görgény (Gurghiu) to Apafi and the Sublime Porte released part of the sum to be paid by him. The German garrison at Kolozsvár continued to resist. Kuchuk Mehmed laid siege to the town and Apafi was forced to join the Ottomans. Apafi wanted to expel the German mercenaries from this important Transylvanian town, but he also wanted to prevent the Ottoman troops from entering Kolozsvár, fearing that they would not abandon it. He started sending letters to Leopold I, asking him to command the garrison to surrender to him. Leopold I did not grant his request, but a truce was signed and Kuchuk Mehmed abandoned the siege on 15 June.

For Husein, Pasha of Várad, made further raids against the region of Kolozsvár, the Diet sent envoys to the Ottoman capital Istanbul, requesting the Sultan Mehmed IV's intervention against the Pasha. The Diet granted a general amnesty to Kemény's former supporters on 22 February 1663. One of them, Dénes Bánffy, was appointed to be the military commander of the Transylvanian troops. Mehmed IV declared war on the Habsburg Empire in April and charged Fazıl Ahmed with the command of the new military campaign. The Grand Vizier informed Apafi that he was determined to transform Royal Hungary into a tributary state and ordered him to join the campaign. Apafi did not dare to resist Fazıl Ahmed's command, but he sent words to the Palatine (or viceroy) of Hungary, Ferenc Wesselényi, about the Ottomans' plans and deferred his departure. Kuchuk Mehmed left Transylvania to join the Grand Vizier's army in August, but Apafi departed for the campaign only after Fazıl Ahmed had threatened him of a new Tatar invasion of Transylvania. By the time he reached the Grand Vizier's camp at Érsekújvár (Nové Zámky, Slovakia) in October, the Ottomans had already captured the town. On Fazıl Ahmed's order, Apafi called on the Hungarian nobility to yield to the Ottomans, but his manifesto remained unnoticed. Before leaving Érsekújvár to winter at Belgrade late in October, the Grand Vizier allowed Apafi to return to Transylvania.

The German mercenaries who were stationed at Székelyhíd (Săcueni) and Kolozsvár had not received their salaries for month. They mutinied and surrendered the two fortresses to Apafi early in 1664. Apafi intensified his diplomatic activities, seeking the Protestant monarchs' protection for Transylvania. He had already approached Lord Winchilsea, the English ambassador at Istanbul. In 1664, he sent letters directly to King Charles II of England. He also entered into correspondence with the head of the French diplomacy, Hugues de Lionne. Leopold I listed Apafi among his potential allies in an anti-Ottoman coalition and Apafi started negotiations with Grigore I Ghica, Prince of Wallachia, about Wallachia's joining the anti-Ottoman alliance.

Fazıl Ahmed resumed his military campaign against the Habsburg Empire in May, but Montecuccoli inflicted a defeat on the Ottoman troops in the Battle of Saint Gotthard on 1 August 1664. Despite the victory, Leopold I did not want to risk a lengthy war against the Ottoman Empire and his deputies signed the Peace of Vasvár on 10 August. The peace treaty confirmed the Ottomans' territorial gains in return for a 22-year truce and Leopold I formally recognized Apafi's rule in Transylvania. The peace treaty also ordered the destruction of the westernmost Transylvanian fort, Székelyhíd.

=== Balancing acts ===
The Peace of Vasvár outraged most Hungarian and Croatian aristocrats, because they thought that Leopold I had sacrificed the liberation of Hungary for a humiliating peace. For Apafi, the Peace of Vasvár proved that the Ottoman Empire was weakening and adopted a new policy, trying to balance between the Ottomans and the Habsburgs. He and the delegates of the Three Nations addressed a letter to Leopold I, pledging that he would never cede the Transylvanian fortresses previously held by German mercenaries to the Ottomans in March 1665. They also requested Leopold I to represent the Transylvanian interests during negotiations with the Ottomans, but Leopold's envoys signed a commercial treaty without mentioning Transylvania.

The discontented Hungarian and Croatian aristocrats held meetings and started conspiring against Leopold I. They wanted to achieve the reunification of Hungary and they were planning to place George II Rákóczi's son, Francis I Rákóczi, on the throne. They had to realize that neither France nor the Polish–Lithuanian Commonwealth was willing to assist them and their leader, Ferenc Wesselényi, resolved to make contacts with Apafi. Apafi's representatives met with Wesselényi in his castle at Murány (Muráň, Slovakia) in August 1666. The conspirators decided to approach Fazıl Ahmed with Apafi's mediation. They offered to acknowledge the Sultan's suzerainty, but Fazıl Ahmed refused their offer because he did not risk an armed conflict with the Habsburg Empire during the Ottoman–Venetian war for Crete. Wesselényi died unexpectedly early in 1667, but his fellows continued the conspiracy. The Transylvanian princely council resolved that Transylvania would not support the conspirators without Fazıl Ahmed's authorization.

Opposed to the Holy Roman Emperor Leopold I, he supported the Ottomans and Hungarian rebels until the Ottoman defeat at the Battle of Vienna on 12 September 1683. Following this, Michael opened talks with Leopold and concluded a treaty with the Austrians on 27 September 1687, obtaining their recognition of his authority in Transylvania.

He died at Fogaras (Făgăraș) in 1690 and was succeeded by his son Michael II Apafi.

A manor house in Mălâncrav belonging to Michael I Apafi has recently been restored by the Mihai Eminescu Trust.

Apafi coat of arms

== Sources ==
- Felezeu, Călin (2009). "The International Political Background (1541–1699); The Legal Status of the Principality of Transylvania in Its Relations with the Ottoman Porte". In Pop, Ioan-Aurel; Nägler, Thomas; Magyari, András (eds.). The History of Transylvania, Vo. II (From 1541 to 1711). Romanian Academy, Center for Transylvanian Studies. pp. 15–73. ISBN 978-973-7784-04-9.
- Ingrao, Charles W. (2003) [1994]. The Habsburg Monarchy, 1618–1815. Cambridge University Press. ISBN 978-0-521-78505-1.
- Kenyeres Ágnes, ed. (1967). Magyar Életrajzi Lexikon (in Hungarian). Vol. 1 A-K. Budapest: Akadémiai Kiadó. OCLC 500204897.
- Keul, István (2009). Early Modern Religious Communities in East-Central Europe: Ethnic Diversity, Denominational Plurality, and Corporative Politics in the Principality of Transylvania (1526–1691). Brill. ISBN 978-90-04-17652-2.
- Kontler, László (1999). Millennium in Central Europe: A History of Hungary. Atlantisz Publishing House. ISBN 963-9165-37-9.
- Kovács, Gergely István (2011). A két Apafi Mihály [The Two Michael Apafis]. Magyar királyok és uralkodók [Hungarian Kings and Monarchs]. Vol. 22. Duna International. ISBN 978-615-5013-14-0.
- Markó, László (2000). A magyar állam főméltóságai Szent Istvántól napjainkig: Életrajzi Lexikon [Great Officers of State in Hungary from King Saint Stephen to Our Days: A Biographical Encyclopedia] (in Hungarian). Magyar Könyvklub. ISBN 963-547-085-1.
- Péter, Katalin; Nagy, Zsigmond József (1981). "A három részre szakadt ország és a török kiűzése (1526–1698): 1606–1698". In Benda, Kálmán; Péter, Katalin (eds.). Magyarország történeti kronológiája, II: 1526–1848 [Historical Chronology of Hungary, Volume I: 1526–1848] (in Hungarian). Akadémiai Kiadó. pp. 361–430. ISBN 963-05-2662-X.
- Péter, Katalin (1994). "The Golden Age of the Principality (1606–1660)". In Köpeczi, Béla; Barta, Gábor; Bóna, István; Makkai, László; Szász, Zoltán; Borus, Judit (eds.). History of Transylvania. Akadémiai Kiadó. pp. 301–358. ISBN 963-05-6703-2.
- R. Várkonyi, Ágnes (1994). "The End of Turkish Rule in Transylvania and the Reunification of Hungary (1660–1711)". In Köpeczi, Béla; Barta, Gábor; Bóna, István; Makkai, László; Szász, Zoltán; Borus, Judit (eds.). History of Transylvania. Akadémiai Kiadó. pp. 359–411. ISBN 963-05-6703-2.
- Várkonyi, Gábor (2012). "Apafi Mihály". In Gujdár, Noémi; Szatmáry, Nóra (eds.). Magyar királyok nagykönyve: Uralkodóink, kormányzóink és az erdélyi fejedelmek életének és tetteinek képes története [Encyclopedia of the Kings of Hungary: An Illustrated History of the Life and Deeds of Our Monarchs, Regents and the Princes of Transylvania] (in Hungarian). Reader's Digest. pp. 240–241. ISBN 978-963-289-214-6.

Preceded by János Kemény	Prince of Transylvania; 1662-1690	Succeeded by Michael II Apafi
