= John Kemény (prince) =

Hungarian aristocrat

- Prince of Transylvania
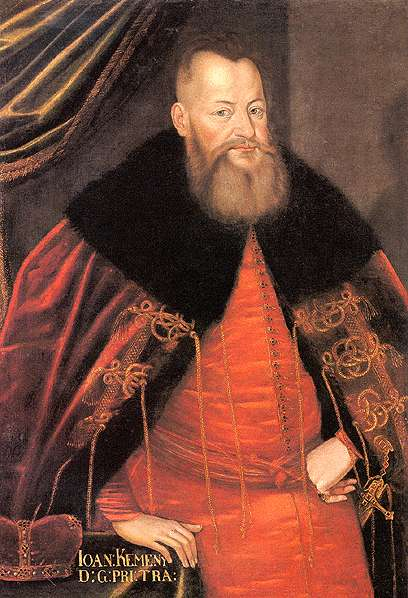
- Reign: 1 January 1661 – 23 January 1662
- Predecessor: Ákos Barcsay
- Successor: Michael I Apafi
- Born: 14 December 1607; Magyarbükkös, Principality of Transylvania
- Died: 23 January 1662 (aged 54); Nagyszőlős, Principality of Transylvania
- Spouse: Zsuzsanna Kállay (m. 1632); Anna Lónyay (m. 1659)
- Issue: Ferenc Kemény; Simon Kemény
- House: Kemény
- Father: Boldizsár Kemény
- Mother: Zsófia Tornyi

János Kemény (14 December 1607 in Magyarbükkös – 23 January 1662 in Szásznagyszőllős) was a Hungarian aristocrat, writer and prince of Transylvania.

János Kemény, offspring of a Transylvanian family of Hungarian aristocrats, held various political and military positions in the Principality of Transylvania, during the reign of princes Gábor Bethlen and George I Rákóczi. As he writes, the family descends from Kemeny Simon, who disguised himself as Hunyadi János and was killed by the Turks instead of his master. The story is recorded by Heltai Gaspar's work, Magyar Cronica, a Hungarian translation/rewriting of the Latin of Antonio Bonfini published in 1560s.

Under George II Rákóczi, he became the chief advisor of the prince, and leader of the military campaigns to Moldavia in 1653 and Poland in 1657, the latter being aimed at obtaining the Polish crown for Rákóczi. The Turks were strongly opposed to Rákóczi's Polish ambitions and prohibited any military action. In the face of Turkish prohibition, Kemény also objected to the prince's ill-conceived Polish undertaking, and unwillingly took the leadership of the campaign that ended in disaster; Kemény's army, deserted by the Swedish allies, was captured by the Crimean Tatar allies of the Turks.

Kemény was held captive by the Tatars until August 1659, when he was released for a huge ransom. During his captivity in Bakhchisaray he wrote his autobiography (in Hungarian), one of the masterpieces of the Transylvanian memoirist literature of the 17th century.

When he returned to Transylvania, he found a country torn by the ambitions of George II Rákóczi, unwilling to resign, a number of would-be princes, and a Turkish Porte vengeful for the unauthorized military campaign. The Sublime Porte now openly disregarded the Transylvanian Estates' right to elect the prince; Kemény saw this, and the successional invasions of Transylvania by the Turks and their Crimean Tatar allies, as an end of Transylvania's autonomy, which he thought could be prevented only with reliance on Habsburg help.

Kemény was elected prince by the Transylvanian Diet on 1 January 1661, after Ákos Barcsay, backed by the Turks, was forced to resign. In April 1661, the Transylvanian Diet, led by Kemény, proclaimed the secession of Transylvania from the Ottoman Empire and called on help from Vienna. In turn, an overwhelming Turkish and Tatar army attacked Transylvania in June, defeating Kemény's army and driving him to Royal Hungary. The Turks installed Mihály Apafi as prince; Kemény, initially supported by Austrian general Montecuccoli returned to Transylvania in early September. However, the Austrian army soon deserted him, and Kemény was killed by the Turks in the battle of Nagyszőllős.

His renaissance family castle is now in half-ruin, due to neglect, in Aranyosmeggyes - visible from the main road Cluj-Napoca-Turda.

Preceded by Ákos Barcsay	Prince of Transylvania; 1661-1662	Succeeded by Michael I Apafi

== Historiography and memory ==
Ioan Kemény MEMORII — Scrierea vieții sale — Casa Cărții de Știință Cluj-Napoca, 2002 ISBN 973-686-260-7

Kemény János Erdélyi Fejcdelem Önèletírása. Kiadta Szalay László, Pest, 1856. Heckenast Gusztáv.

Kemény János önéletírása 1657-1658, Szépirodalmi könyvkiadó, 1986, A szöveggondozás és a jegyzetek V. Windisch Éva munkája
