= Laslea (river) =

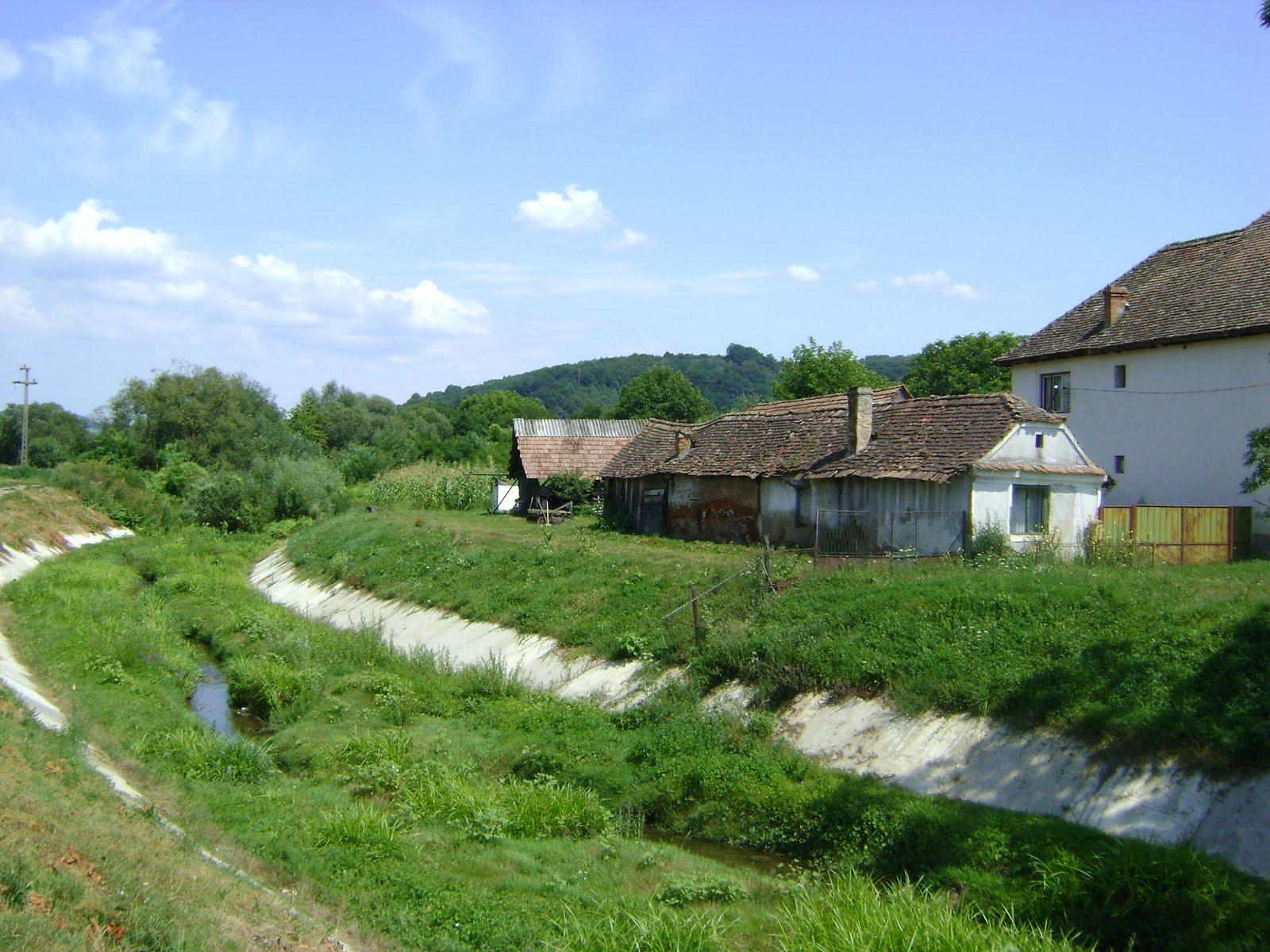

- Location within Romania

Location
- Country: Romania
- Counties: Sibiu County
- Villages: Nou Săsesc, Roandola, Laslea

Physical characteristics
- Mouth: Târnava Mare
  - location: Laslea
  - coordinates: 46.2315°N 24.6747°E
- Length: 22 km (14 mi)
- Basin size: 111 km^{2} (43 sq mi)
- Discharge
  - maximum: 0.345 m^{3}/s (12.2 cu ft/s)

Basin features
- Progression: Târnava Mare→ Târnava→ Mureș→ Tisza→ Danube→ Black Sea
- Tributaries
  - left: Lapșea
  - right: Mălâncrav, Felța

The Laslea is a left tributary of the river Târnava Mare in Romania. It discharges into the Târnava Mare near the village Laslea. Its length is 22 km (14 mi) and its basin size is 111 km^{2} (43 sq mi).
