= Michael II Apafi =

- Prince of Transylvania
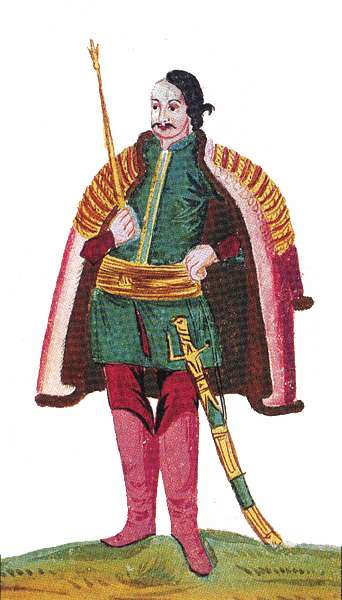
- Portrait of Michael II Apafi

Prince of Transylvania
- Reign: 10 June 1690 - 1699
- Predecessor: Emeric Thököly
- Successor: Francis II Rákóczi
- Born: 13 October 1676; Gyulafehérvár, Principality of Transylvania (today Alba Iulia, Romania)
- Died: 1 February 1713 (aged 36); Vienna, Habsburg Empire
- House: Apafi
- Father: Michael I Apafi
- Mother: Anna Bornemisza

Michael Apafi (Hungarian: Apafi Mihály; 13 October 1676 – 1 February 1713) was the son of the Hungarian Michael I Apafi and Anna Bornemisza. Following his father, he was Prince of Transylvania from 10 June 1690 to 1699.

Michael had been associated with his father as ruler since 10 June 1681 and had been confirmed as heir by the Ottomans. At his father's death, the Turks however recognized Imre Thököly, an anti-Habsburg claimant of Hungary, as Prince of Transylvania. Thököly briefly held Transylvania in 1690/91 but left the country after his generals had been defeated by Habsburg troops.

In the meantime, Michael's advisors had reached an agreement with Emperor Leopold, who granted in 1690 the country administrative, economic and cultural autonomy and freedom of religion. The Emperor recognized Michael as Prince and in 1691 the diet of Fogrash appointed a governing council until the Prince would come of age. The council was chaired by György Bánffy as governor and also included Chancellor Miklós Bethlen, General Gergely Bethlen and Treasurer János Haller. To protect himself against new Turkish attacks and Habsburg attempts to restrict Transylvanian autonomy, Prince Michael—at the advice of his Chancellor—declared the King of England and the Elector of Brandenburg as his guardians.

England and the Netherlands pressured Emperor Leopold into ending the war against the Turks, proposing a peace that would also respect the independence of Transylvania, which should be ruled by Prince Michael under the joint protectorate of Habsburgs and Ottomans and the control of the international powers. Based on these proposals, negotiations continued until 1698.

However, the Habsburgs considered an independent Transylvania protected by English and Dutch guarantees a threat to their dynasty's future. In parallel to the peace negotiations, they strengthened their own position in the country. In 1692, Prince Michael was called to Vienna, ostensibly concerning a dispute over his recent marriage, interned and forced to cede to Leopold the official control of Transylvania, which in 1695 was occupied by 8,000 men and in 1696 put under the rule of a military governor.

Michael received a pension from the Emperor and lived in Vienna until his death in 1713, aged 36.

== Personal life ==
Michael II was married to Countess Katalin Bethlen de Bethlen (d. 1725), daughter of Count Gergely I Bethlen de Bethlen (1641-1697) and Maria Thoroczkay de Thoroczko-Szent-Gyorgy (1652-1698). They didn't have children.

== External sources ==
- https://www.britannica.com/place/Transylvania#ref37593
- https://rubicon.hu/kalendarium/1690-aprilis-15-i-apafi-mihaly-erdelyi-fejedelem-halala
- https://tti.abtk.hu/terkepek/1661-1690-az-erdelyi-fejedelemseg-i-apafi-mihaly-koraban
- https://m.mult-kor.hu/egy-felreallitott-fejedelem-a-hanyatlo-erdelyben-ii-apafi-mihaly-20220201?fbrkMR=mobile

Preceded by Michael I Apafi	Prince of Transylvania; 1690–1699	Succeeded by Austrian rule
