= Anna Bornemisza =

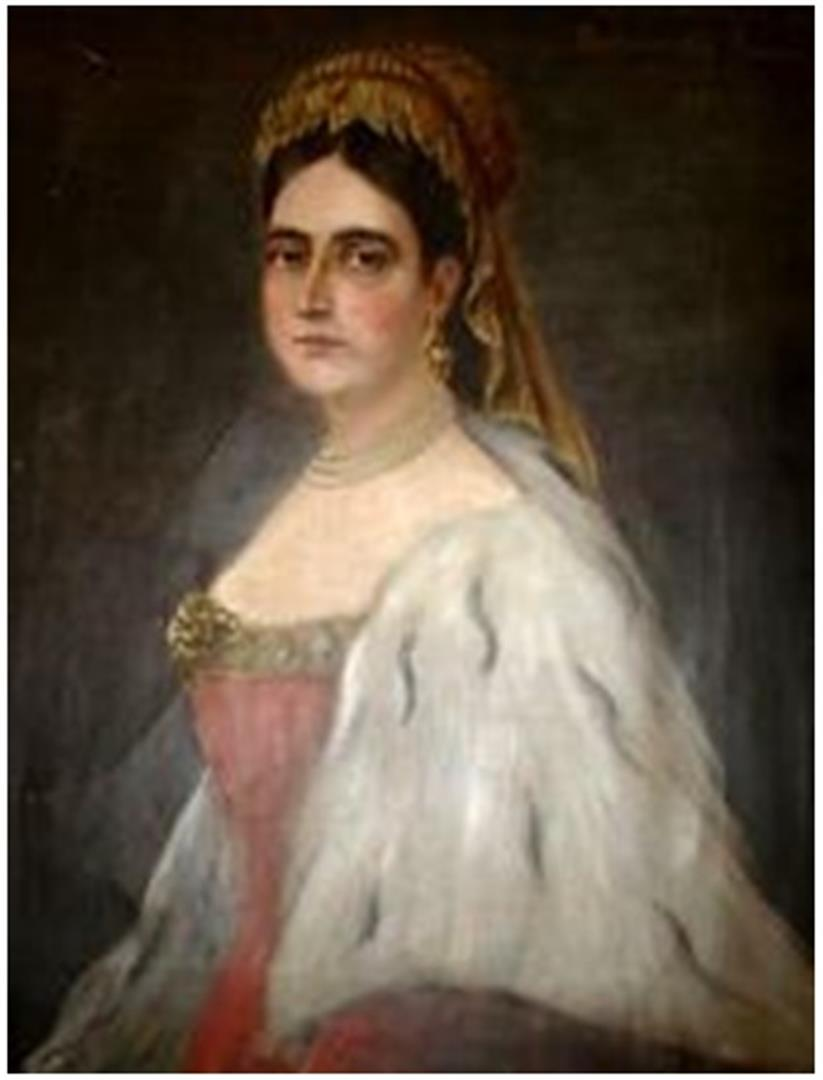

Princess Consort of Transylvania
- Reign: 14 September 1661 – 5 August 1688
- Predecessor: Anna Lónyay
- Successor: Ilona Zrínyi
- Born: 1630
- Died: August 5, 1688 (aged 57–58); Ebesfalva, Transylvania
- Burial: Farkas Street Reformed Church
- Spouse: Michael I Apafi
- Issue: Michael II Apafi
- House: Apafi
- Father: Pál Bornemisza
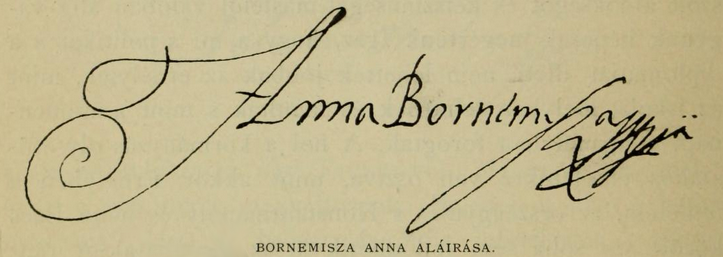
- Signature

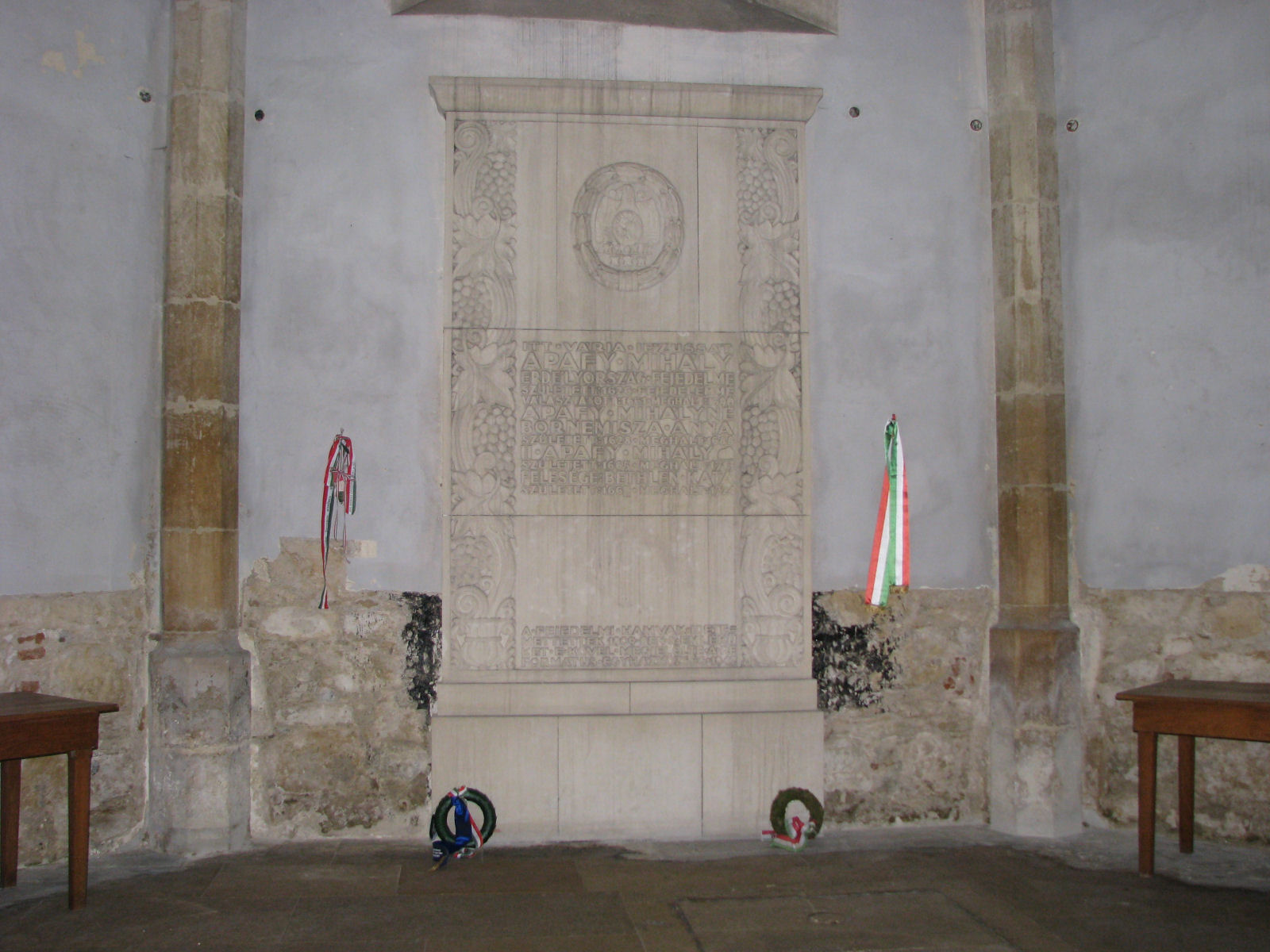
The grave of Anna Bornemisza in the Reformed Church of Farkas street in Cluj-Napoca

Anna Bornemisza (1630-1688), was a Hungarian noble, princess consort of Transylvania as the spouse of Michael I Apafi, and mother of Michael II Apafi. Her cookery book from 1680, as well as her preserved household budget book, are regarded as important documents of Hungarian literary history. As Princess of Transylvania, Anna exerted a large and acknowledged influence upon the affairs of state.

Bornemisza was the daughter of a military captain. She spent her childhood in Jenő and Munkács. She married Michael I Apafi in 1653. When her husband was captured in 1657, Bornemisza collected 12,000 horses as his ransom. She was influential over matters of state when her husband was elected the leader of Transylvania. She had fourteen children but only one son, Michael II Apafi, reached adulthood.
