= Mălâncrav (river) =

- Location within Romania

Location
- Country: Romania
- Counties: Sibiu County
- Villages: Mălâncrav

Physical characteristics
- Mouth: Laslea
  - coordinates: 46.1899°N 24.6388°E
- Length: 14 km (8.7 mi)
- Basin size: 41 km^{2} (16 sq mi)

Basin features
- Progression: Laslea→ Târnava Mare→ Târnava→ Mureș→ Tisza→ Danube→ Black Sea

The Mălâncrav is a river in Romania, a right tributary of the river Laslea, which it joins upstream from the village of Laslea. Its length is 14 km (8.7 mi) and its basin size is 41 km^{2} (16 sq mi).
