= George II Rákóczi =

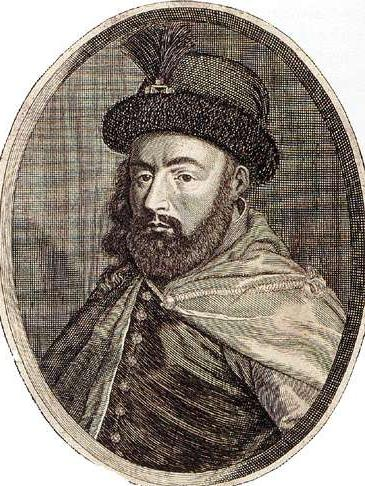
- George II Rákóczi

Prince of Transylvania
- Reign: 11 October 1648 – 7 June 1660
- Predecessor: George I Rákóczi
- Successor: John Kemény
- Born: 30 January 1621; Sárospatak, Hungary
- Died: 7 June 1660 (aged 39); Nagyvárad, Principality of Transylvania
- Spouse: Sophia Báthory (m. 1643)
- Issue: Francis I Rákóczi
Names
- Hungarian: II. Rákóczi György; English: George II Rákóczi
- House: Rákóczi
- Father: George I Rákóczi
- Mother: Zsuzsanna Lorántffy
- Religion: Calvinism

George II Rákóczi (30 January 1621 – 7 June 1660), was a Hungarian nobleman, Prince of Transylvania (1648–1660), the eldest son of George I and Zsuzsanna Lorántffy.

== Early life ==
He was elected Prince of Transylvania during his father's lifetime (19 February 1642). On 3 February 1643, he married Sophia Báthory, a granddaughter of Stephen Báthory IX. Their son was Francis I Rákóczi.

== War with the Polish-Lithuanian Commonwealth ==
=== Preparation ===
On ascending the throne (October 1648), his first thought was to realize his father's ambitions in Poland. With this object in view, he allied himself, in the beginning of 1649, with the Cossack hetman Bohdan Khmelnytsky, and the hospodars of Moldavia and Wallachia, (Vasile Lupu and Matei Basarab), but took no action for several years. On 6 December 1656, by the Treaty of Radnot, he also allied with King Charles X Gustav of Sweden against King John II Casimir of Poland. Rákóczi was to seize the provinces of Lesser Poland and Mazovia, together with rich salt deposits in Wieliczka and Bochnia.

=== 1657 ===
In 1657, he invaded the Polish–Lithuanian Commonwealth in the third part of the Second Northern War (1655–1660), also known as the Deluge.

==== Spring ====
In late January 1657, Rákóczi's 25,000-strong army crossed the Carpathian Mountains near Krosno. The Transylvanians headed towards Medyka, where 10,000 Zaporozhian Cossacks under Anton Zdanovich joined them. The Transylvanian-Cossack army approached Lwów, but failed to capture the fortified city. Then it headed westwards, to Kraków. The army's march was marked by atrocities, destruction, and looting. Rákóczi captured and destroyed Dukla, Lesko, and Sanok, but failed to seize Przemyśl, Krosno, and Łańcut. On 21 March 1657, Rákóczi entered Tarnów, and seven days later reached Kraków, which was already under Swedish control.

==== April ====
The Swedish garrison of Kraków was reinforced by 2,500 Transylvanians under János Bethlen, while the rest under Rákóczi headed northwards. On 12 April, near Ćmielów, the Transylvanians joined the Swedish army under Charles X Gustav. The combined forces crossed the Vistula at Zawichost, on 19 April capturing Lublin.

==== May ====
On 8 May the Swedish-Transylvanian army besieged Brest Litovsk, capturing it two days later. After the siege, Rákóczi's soldiers plundered and looted intensely. The Transylvanians burned Biała Podlaska and Brańsk to the ground among other towns. On 20 May, news of the Dano-Swedish War reached Charles X Gustav and the king decided to march towards Swedish Pomerania, leaving Gustaf Otto Stenbock in charge.

==== June ====
The army then marched towards Warsaw, burning the towns of Mielnik, Drohiczyn, Nur, Brok, and Pniewo. On 17 June, after a three-day siege, Rákóczi and Stenbock captured Warsaw. Swedish forces remained in Warsaw only for a few days, as on 22 June they left the city for Stettin, to join the war against Denmark. Since Rákóczi was well aware of the real quality of his army, he decided to abandon Warsaw as well, and head southeast.

==== July ====
Following an order of the Polish King John II Casimir Vasa, the Transylvanians were followed by a 10,000-strong Stefan Czarniecki's mounted army, supported by Aleksander Hilary Połubiński's Lithuanians and Austrian allies. Simultaneously, Jerzy Lubomirski's forces organized a revenge invasion of Transylvania, with widespread looting and destruction of Rákóczi's realm. On 8 July 1657 in Lancut, Polish leaders decided to split their forces. Stefan Czarniecki was to follow Rákóczi, while Jerzy Lubomirski and Stanisław "Rewera" Potocki were to cut the Transylvanians and Cossacks from crossing the border and escaping Poland. On 11 July Czarniecki partly destroyed the Transylvanian army in the Battle of Magierów. On 16 July, the Polish armies united and on 20 July Rákóczi was defeated in the Battle of Czarny Ostrów.

===== Rákóczi capitulates =====
After the defeat and subsequent retreat of his Cossack allies, Rákóczi withdrew towards the Podolian town of Miedzyboz, where he capitulated to Jerzy Lubomirski (23 July), promising to break his alliance with Sweden, abandon the cities of Kraków and Brest Litovsk, and pay a contribution in the total amount of over 4 million złotys.

===== Final blow by the Crimean Tatars =====
Polish commanders allowed his forces to march towards Transylvania, but on 26 July, Rákóczi was attacked by Tatars from the Crimean Khanate, who at that time were Poland–Lithuania's allies. Rákóczi abandoned his army, leaving it in the hands of János Kemény. The Transylvanian camp, located near Trembowla, was captured by the Tatars on 31 July. Some 500 Transylvanians were killed, and about 11,000 captured and taken to the Crimea. As a result, Rákóczi's army ceased to exist.

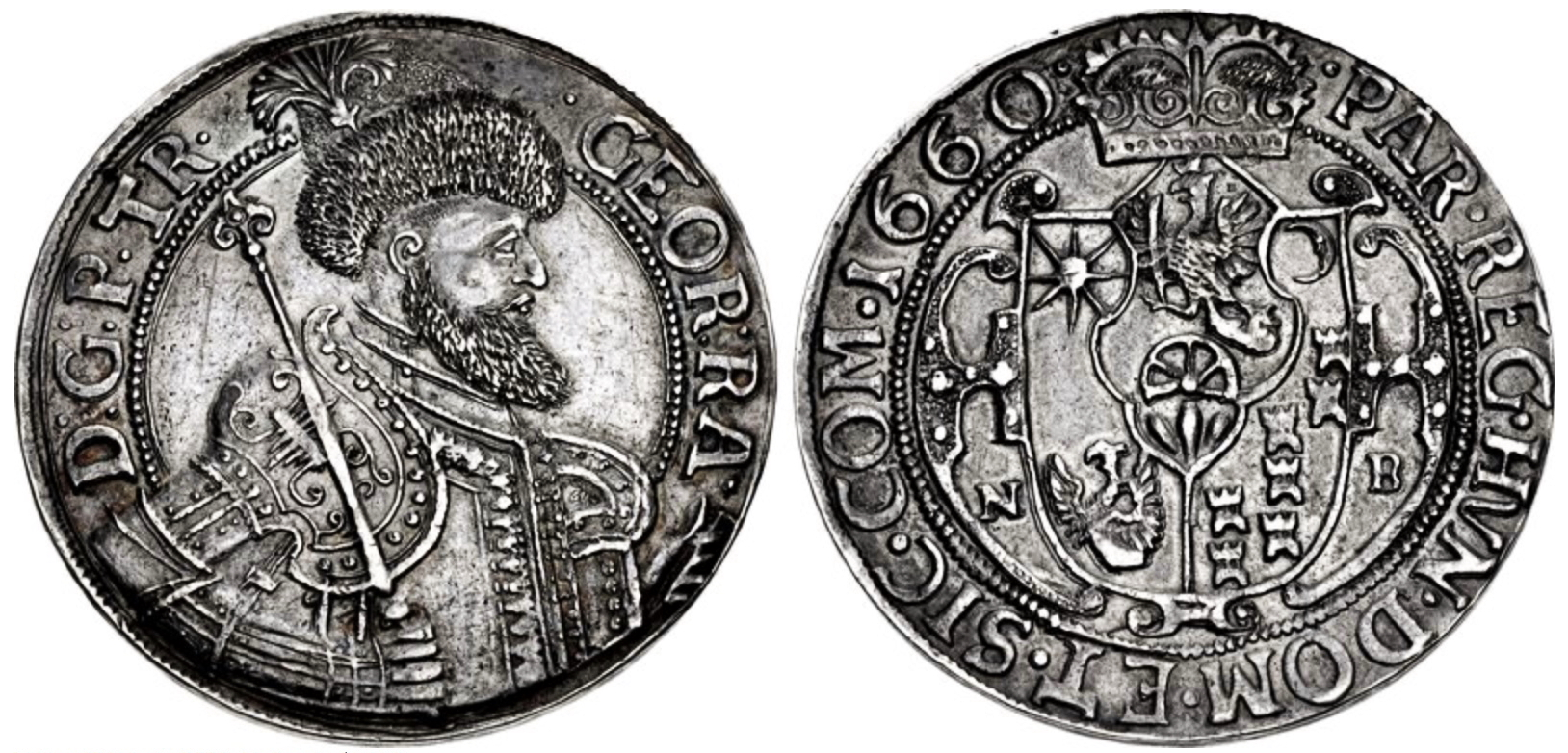
Thaler of George II Rákóczi showing his portrait and coat of arms (1660)

== Depositions and reinstatements ==
On 3 November 1657, at the command of the Ottoman Empire (to which Transylvania was tributary), the Diet deposed him for undertaking an unauthorized war and replaced him by Francis Rhédey. But in January 1658 he was reinstated by a new session of the Diet at Medgyes. Again he was deposed by the Turkish Grand Vizier, and again reinstated as if nothing had happened.

=== War with the Ottomans ===
Finally, the Turks invaded Transylvania, and Rákóczi died at Nagyvárad of wounds received at the battle of Gyalu (May 1660).

== Family ==
Ancestors of George I Rákóczi

16. Zsigmond Rákóczi
8. János Rákóczi
17. Dóra Haraszthy
4. Sigismund Rákóczi
18. Miklós Némethy
9. Sára Némethy
19. Katalin Lucskay
2. George I Rákóczi
10. János Gerendi
5. Anna Gerendi
22. Bertalan Erdélyi
11. Kata Erdélyi
23. Klára Kemény
1. George II Rákóczi
24. János Lórántffy
12. László Lórántffy
25. Borbála Derencsényi
6. Mihály Lórántffy
26. Albert Horváthy
13. Erzsébet Horváthy
27. Dorottya Bölcsey
3. Zsuzsanna Lorántffy
28. Janos Zeleméri
14. Miklós Zeleméri
29. Anna Dobó
7. Bora Zeleméri
30. Miklós Henyey
15. Margit Henyey
31. Anna Dombai

== Sources ==
- Bain, Robert Nisbet (1911). "Rákóczy s.v. George II." . In Chisholm, Hugh (ed.). Encyclopædia Britannica. Vol. 22 (11th ed.). Cambridge University Press. p. 868.
- Hangay, Zoltán (1987). Erdély választott fejedelme: Rákóczi Zsigmond [Elected Prince of Transylvania: Sigismund Rákóczi]. Zrínyi Kiadó. ISBN 963-326-363-8.
- Nagy, László (1984). A "bibliás őrálló" fejedelem: I. Rákóczi György a magyar históriában [The "Bible-reader and Guarding" Prince: George I Rákóczi in Hungarian Hitoriography]. Magvető Kiadó. ISBN 963-14-0204-5.
- Okmanytár II Rákóczi György diplomaciai összeköttetéseihez[Resources about George Rákóczi's diplomatic relations(letters etc.)] .(1874).Editor: Szilágyi, Sandor. Budapest, Eggenberger fele akadémiai konyvkereskedes.
- Péter, Katalin (1994). "The Golden Age of the Principality (1606–1660)". In Köpeczi, Béla; Barta, Gábor; Bóna, István; Makkai, László; Szász, Zoltán; Borus, Judit (eds.). History of Transylvania. Akadémiai Kiadó. pp. 301–358. ISBN 963-05-6703-2.
- Encyclopedia of Ukraine Editor in Chief Vladimir Kubiiovych. - Paris, New York: Young Life, 1954–1989.

Preceded by George I Rákóczi	Prince of Transylvania; 1648– Nov.1657	Succeeded by Francis Rhédey
Preceded by Francis Rhédey	Prince of Transylvania; Jan.1658–Sep.1658	Succeeded by Ákos Barcsay
Preceded by Ákos Barcsay	Prince of Transylvania; Aug.1659–Jun.1660	Succeeded by Ákos Barcsay
