= Ákos Barcsay =

Transylvanian prince

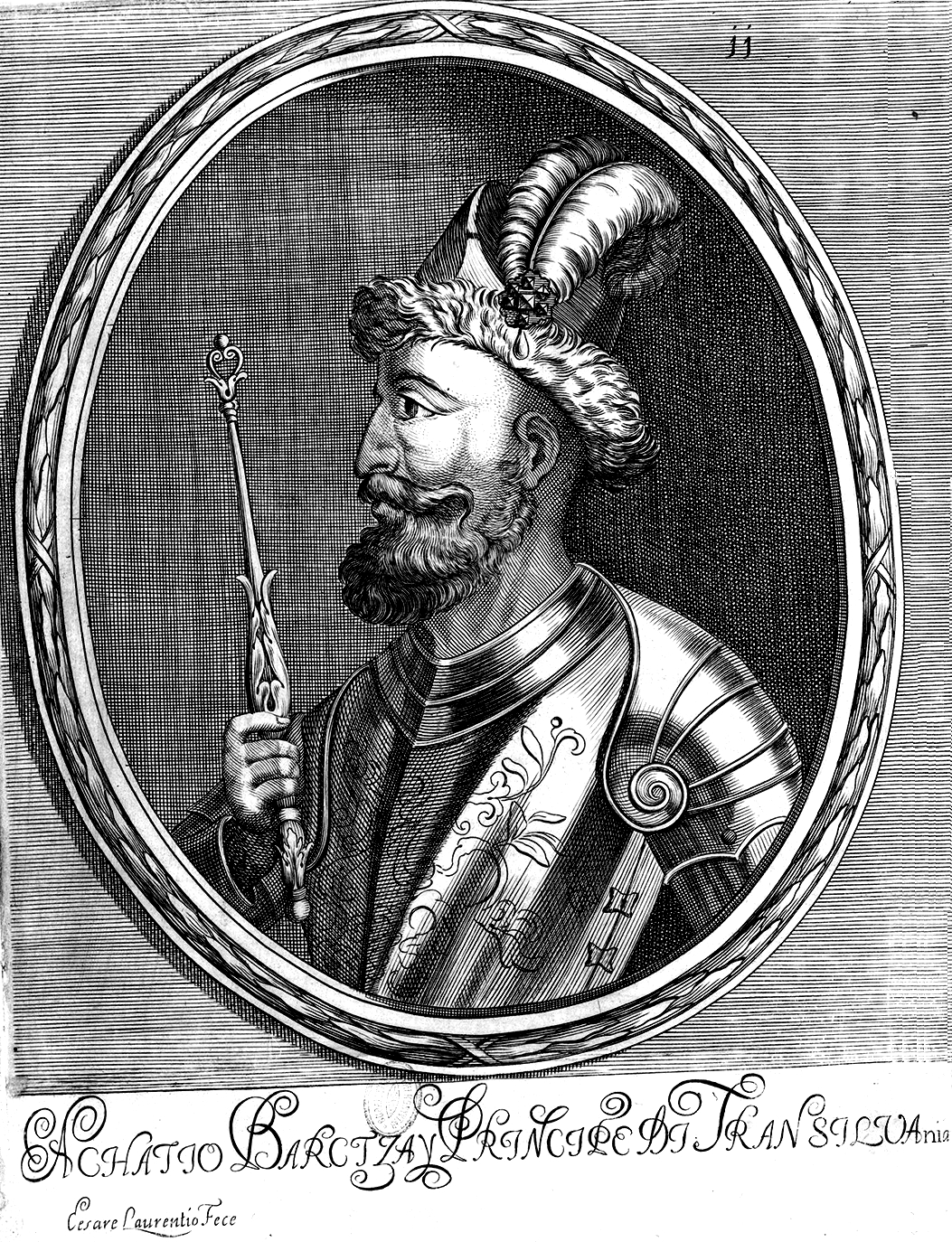
Ákos Barcsay, Prince of Transylvania, c. 1660

Ákos Barcsay (Achatius) (c. 1610 – July 1661) was Prince of Transylvania from September 14, 1658 to December 31, 1660.

Barcsay's reign of a little over two years was a period of considerable domestic and international turmoil. It occurred during the end of Transylvania's "golden age" and saw the renewal of Ottoman power under an energetic new grand vizier, Mehmet Köprülü. Prince Barcsay had the unenviable task of satisfying draconian Turkish territorial and financial demands while attempting to keep his deposed predecessor, Prince George II Rákóczi, at bay. It was an almost impossible task. Analysis of his career by Hungarian historians shows him to have been a weak character prone to taking the easy option best suited to his self-interests. His marriage to a fifteen-year-old girl, with whom he became obsessed, was frowned upon by his contemporaries, not because of her age but because Barcsay was said to focus on little else other than his obsession. His name does not register among the greats of Hungarian history and many studies dismiss him as a charlatan. Barcsay had no direct male heirs, so his line died with him. Various claimants to descend from Barcsay have recently emerged in Transylvania and Hungary. Most respected sources prove these claims to be spurious and bogus.

Akos Barcsay de Nagybarcsa was born to an old and distinguished Calvinist noble family of Hunyad County (now Hunedoara County), in southern Transylvania, whose origins reach back to the mid-13th century. His father, Sándor (Alexander) Barcsay, Vice-Comes (Alispan) of Hunyad County, had been a courtier, envoy, and soldier. His mother was Erzsebet (Elizabeth) Palatics de Illadia, daughter of Gyorgy (George) Palatics, Ban (Governor) of Lugos and Karansebes. On both sides, Ákos Barcsay was a descendant of prominent Transylvanian and Hungarian families — Bogathy, Zalasdy, Seredy, Fanchy, and Varday among others.

He grew up at the court of Prince Gabriel Bethlen. The first significant station in his career was an embassy to the Sublime Porte in 1642 in the service of George I Rákóczy. In 1648 he was chief governor of Hunyad County. Prince George II Rákóczy appointed him a princely councilor in 1657 and governor for the time of his campaign to Poland.

The Turks deposed Rákóczy after his unfortunate and unauthorised campaign and had Francis Rhédey elected prince on 2 November 1657. However, Rákóczy returned in January 1658 and forced the Diet to recognize him on 25 January 1658. As a reaction, the Turks invaded Transylvania, leaving a trail of destruction through the country. Grand Vizier Köprülü Mehmed Pasha appointed Barcsay as prince on 14 September 1658, and the Diet had to agree to the payment of a high tribute and recognition of Barcsay's principality (11 October).

Rákóczy invaded Transylvania again, and Barcsay fled to the Pasha of Timișoara in August 1659. When Rákóczy was killed in battle in June 1660, Barcsay was reinstated, but a new pretender to the throne appeared in the person of János Kemény. He relied on the Székelys, who were radically against Barcsay's collaboration with the Turks and hoped for the help of the Viennese court. Kemény invaded Transylvania in November 1660. Although Barcsay had voluntarily abdicated on 11 December 1660, the new prince had him imprisoned in Görgény and his brother Andreas hanged. He correctly accused Barcsay of having contacted the Turks from prison and had him assassinated in July 1661 in Kozmatelke.

== Sources ==
- IOS
- Deutsche Biographie
- Sapere

Preceded by George II Rákóczi	Prince of Transylvania; Sep.1658– Aug.1659	Succeeded by George II Rákóczi
Preceded by George II Rákóczi	Prince of Transylvania; Jun.1660–Dec.1660	Succeeded by János Kemény
