= Laslea =

- Commune
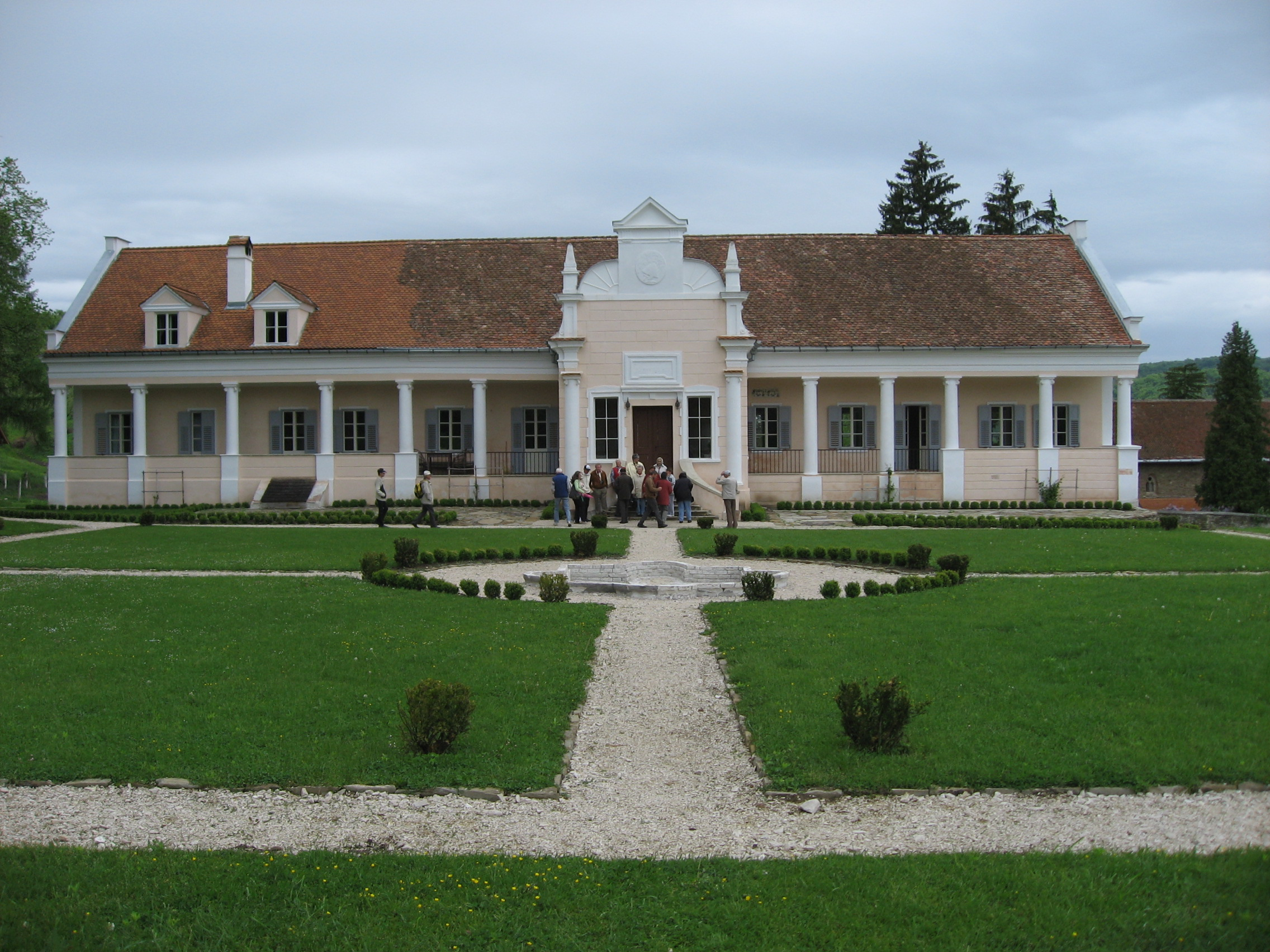
- Apafi manor in Mălâncrav

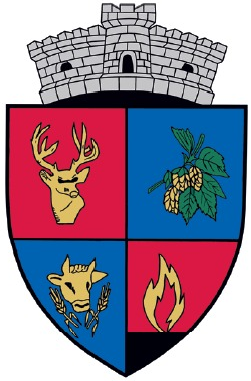
- Coat of arms

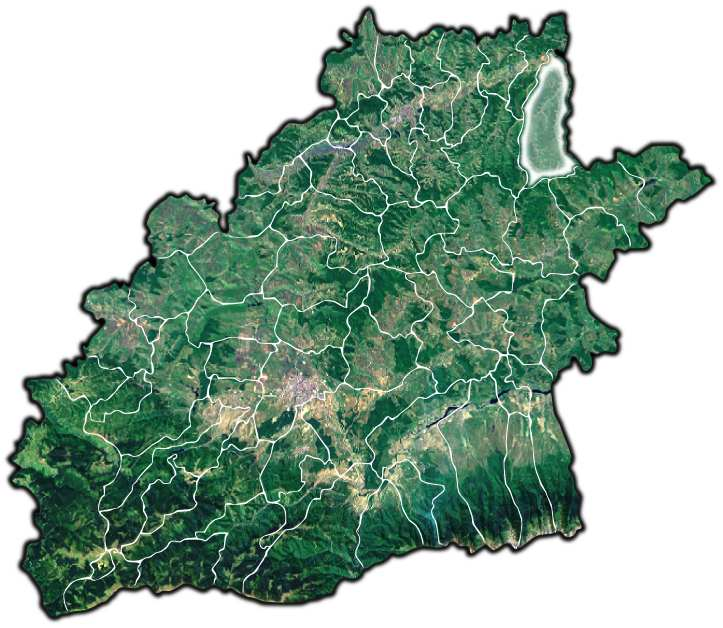
- Location in Sibiu County

- Location in Romania
- Coordinates: 46°13′N 24°39′E
- Country: Romania
- County: Sibiu

Government
  - Mayor (2024–2028): Ioan Onea (PSD)
- Area: 113 km^{2} (44 sq mi)
- Elevation: 351 m (1,152 ft)
- Population (2021-12-01): 3,100
  - Density: 27/km^{2} (71/sq mi)
- Time zone: UTC+02:00 (EET)
  - Summer (DST): UTC+03:00 (EEST)
- Postal code: 557115
- Area code: +40 x59
- Vehicle reg.: SB
- Website: comunalaslea.ro

Laslea (German: Grosslasseln; Hungarian: Szászszentlászló) is a commune located in Sibiu County, Transylvania, Romania. It is composed of five villages: Florești, Laslea, Mălâncrav, Nou Săsesc, and Roandola. In Romanian, Florești was known as Felța until 1950.

== Geography ==
The commune is situated towards the center of the Transylvanian Plateau. It is located in the northeastern part of Sibiu County, on the border with Mureș County. It lies on the banks of the river Laslea, which discharges into the Târnava Mare near the village Laslea.

National road DN14 runs just north of the commune. The closest cities are Sighișoara, 13 km (8.1 mi) to the east, and Mediaș, 28 km (17 mi) to the west; the county capital, Sibiu, is 83 km (52 mi) to the southwest.

== Villages ==
In Romanian	In German	In Hungarian
Florești	Felsendorf	Földszin
Laslea	Grosslasseln	Szászszentlászló
Mălâncrav	Malmkrog	Almakerék
Nou Săsesc	Neudorf	Apaújfalu
Roandola	Rauthal	Rudály

=== Mălâncrav ===
Mălâncrav is a village in Laslea commune. An asphalt road of 13 km leads to the village. In the formerly majority Transylvanian Saxon village, there still is a small community of Saxons.

The Saxon Romanesque Lutheran church has early 14th-century Gothic murals in the apse, with 15th-century murals in the nave and a 15th-century late Gothic altar. They constitute some of the most significant Gothic murals in Transylvania aside from those at Ghelința in Covasna County. In later centuries the Apafi family (descending from a certain Saxon man named Apa; later a leading Hungarian noble family in Transylvania) buried their dead in the church, since they had overlordship in the village. In 1902, the tomb chest of György Apafi, father of Mihaly Apafi, and his family was transferred to the Hungarian National Museum in Budapest.

Mălâncrav was not part of the autonomous Saxon territory, although it had a majority Saxon population until the late 20th century.

The film Malmkrog (2020) was named after the village and was shot at the Apafi manor.

== Demographics ==
Historical population
Year	Pop.	±%
1850	3,802	—
1880	4,336	+14.0%
1900	4,587	+5.8%
1920	4,397	−4.1%
1941	5,043	+14.7%
1977	4,675	−7.3%
1992	3,276	−29.9%
2002	3,203	−2.2%
2011	3,327	+3.9%
2022	3,100	−6.8%
Source: Official Austro-Hungarian and Romanian census data

At the 2002 census, the commune had a population of 3,203; of those, 76.2% were Romanian Orthodox, 7.2% Pentecostal, 5.7% Evangelical Lutheran, 5.2% Seventh-day Adventist, 2.6% Evangelical Church of Augustan Confession, and 1.2% Baptist. At the 2011 census, Laslea had 3,327 inhabitants; of those, 58.67% were Romanians, 29.55% Roma, 7.36% Germans, and 1.02% Hungarians. At the 2021 census, the commune had a population of 3,100, of which 56.71% were Romanians, 25.45% Roma, and 5.81% Germans.

== Economy ==
The Noul Săsesc gas field is situated on the territory of the commune.

== Sustainable tourism ==
In 2006, the then-Prince of Wales bought and restored two 18th-century Saxon houses in the villages of Mălâncrav and Viscri to help protect the unique way of life that has existed for hundreds of years and promote sustainable tourism.

The buildings have been sensitively restored and converted into guesthouses for tourists. They remain in keeping with the surrounding architecture and feature a number of Transylvanian antiques but with modern facilities where possible. The renovation of these buildings has helped provide a sustainable future for the people of rural Transylvania while also enabling residents to maintain their traditional way of life.

The route of the Via Transilvanica long-distance trail passes through the villages of Florești, Mălâncrav, and Nou Săsesc.

== Mălâncrav church gallery ==
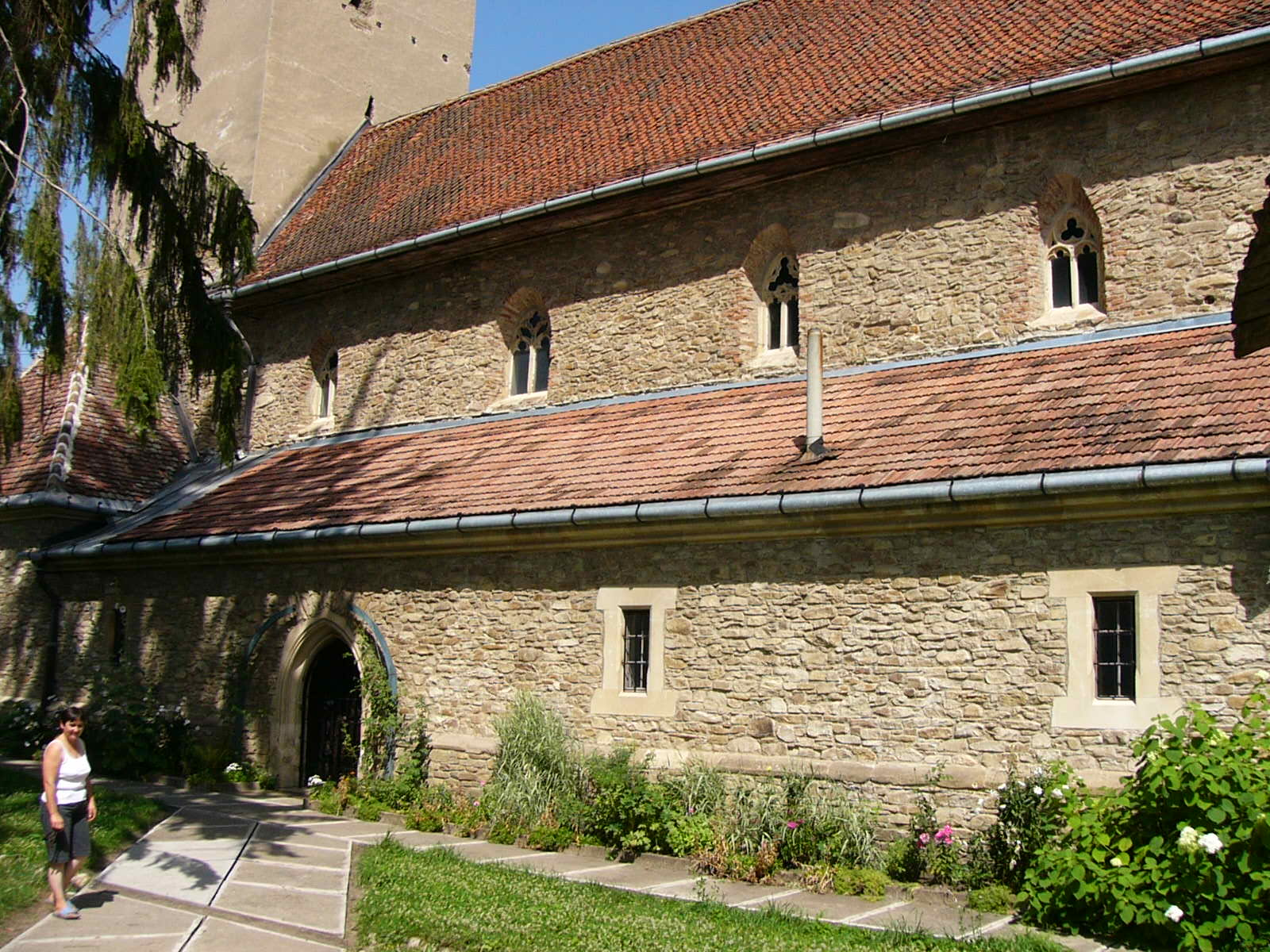
Exterior

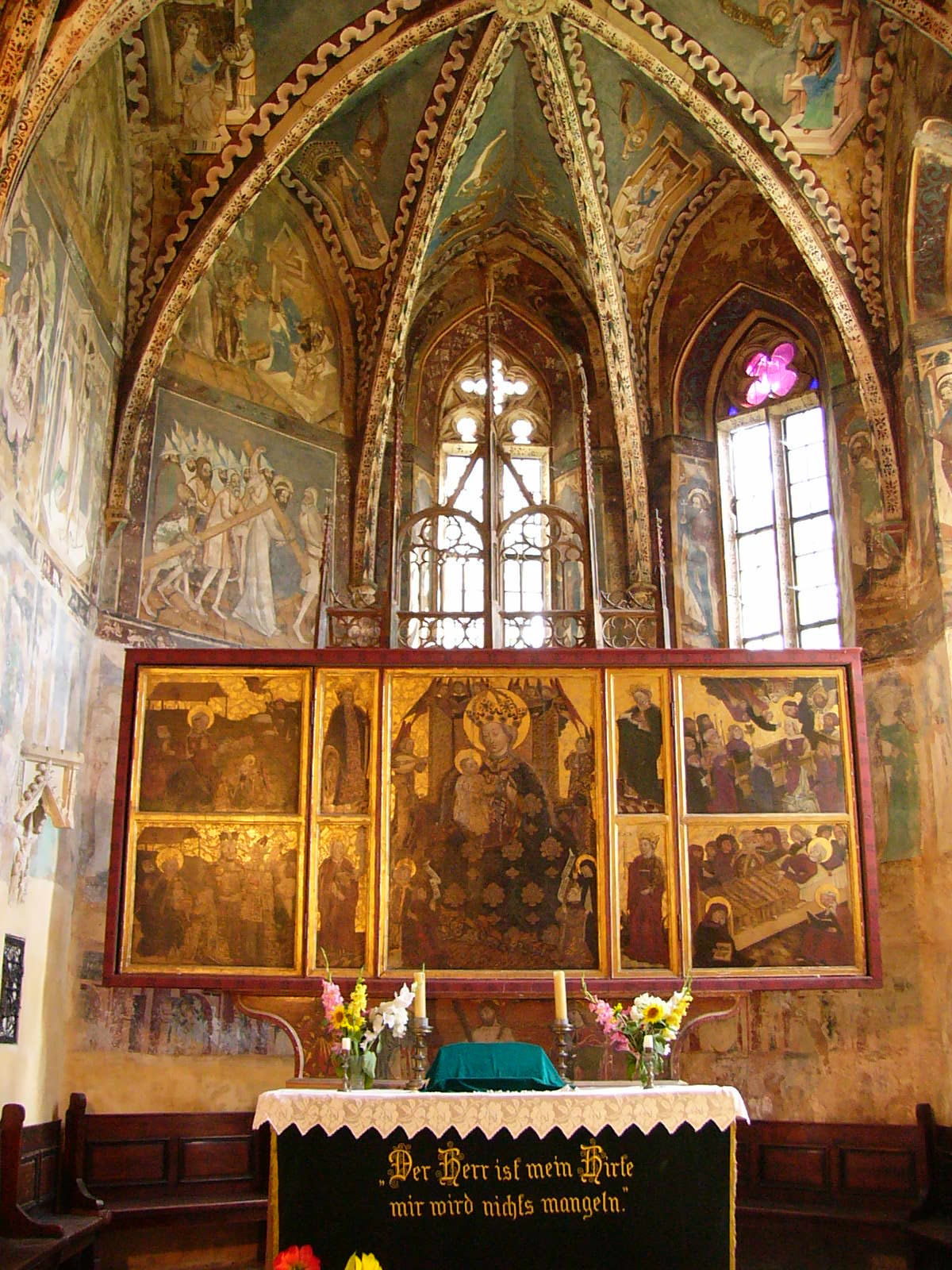
The apse

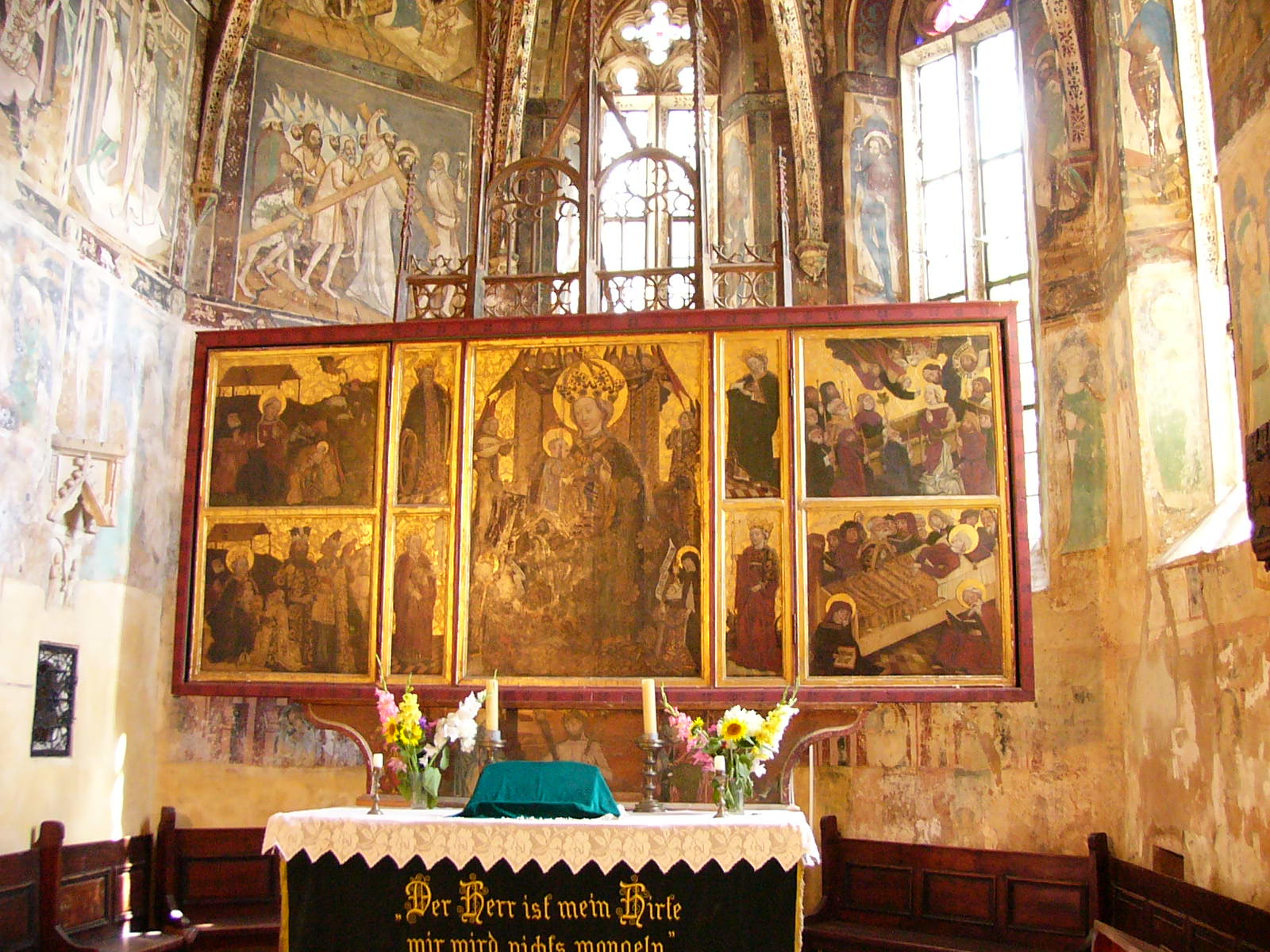
15th-century altar

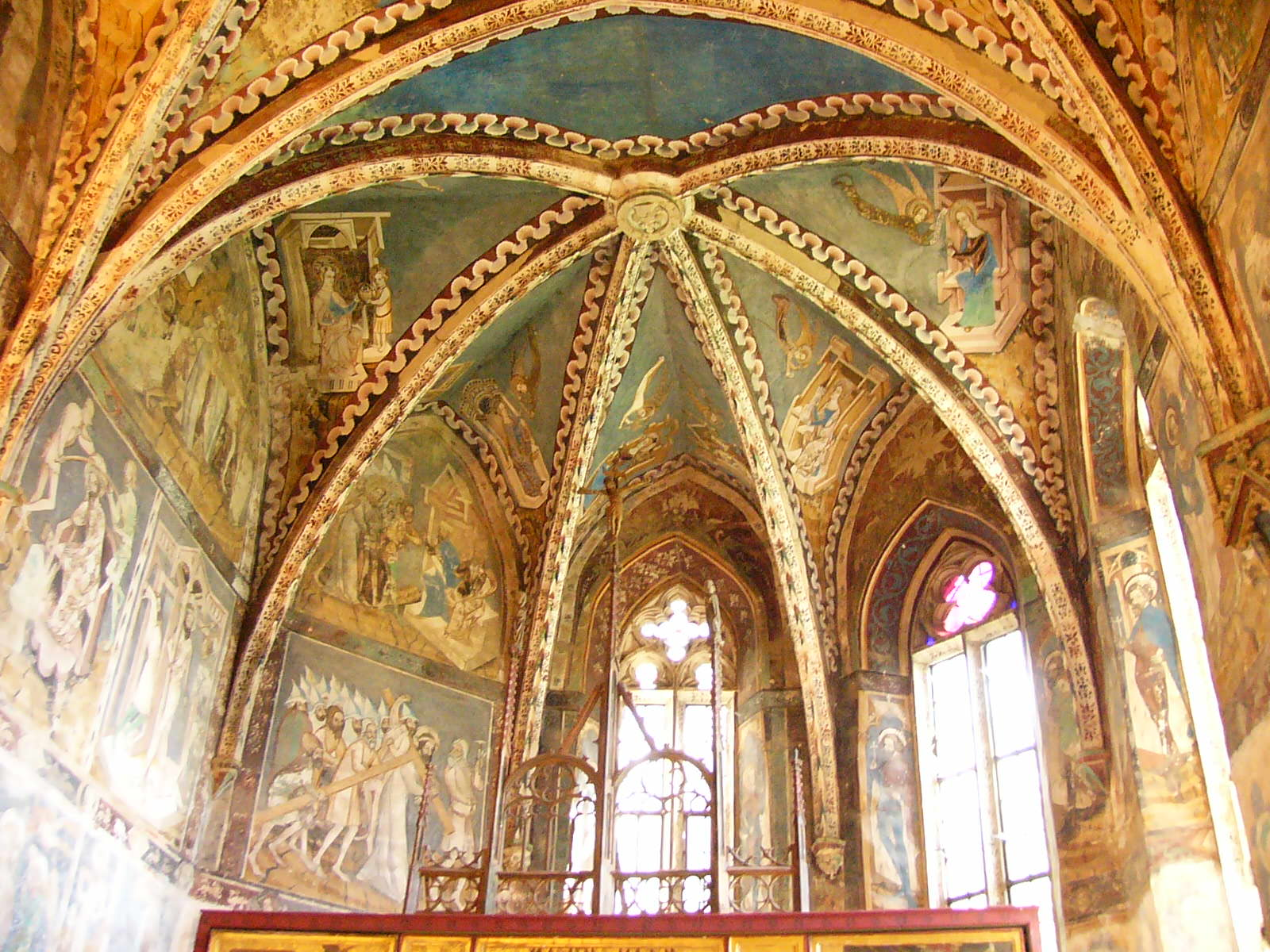
Apse ceiling

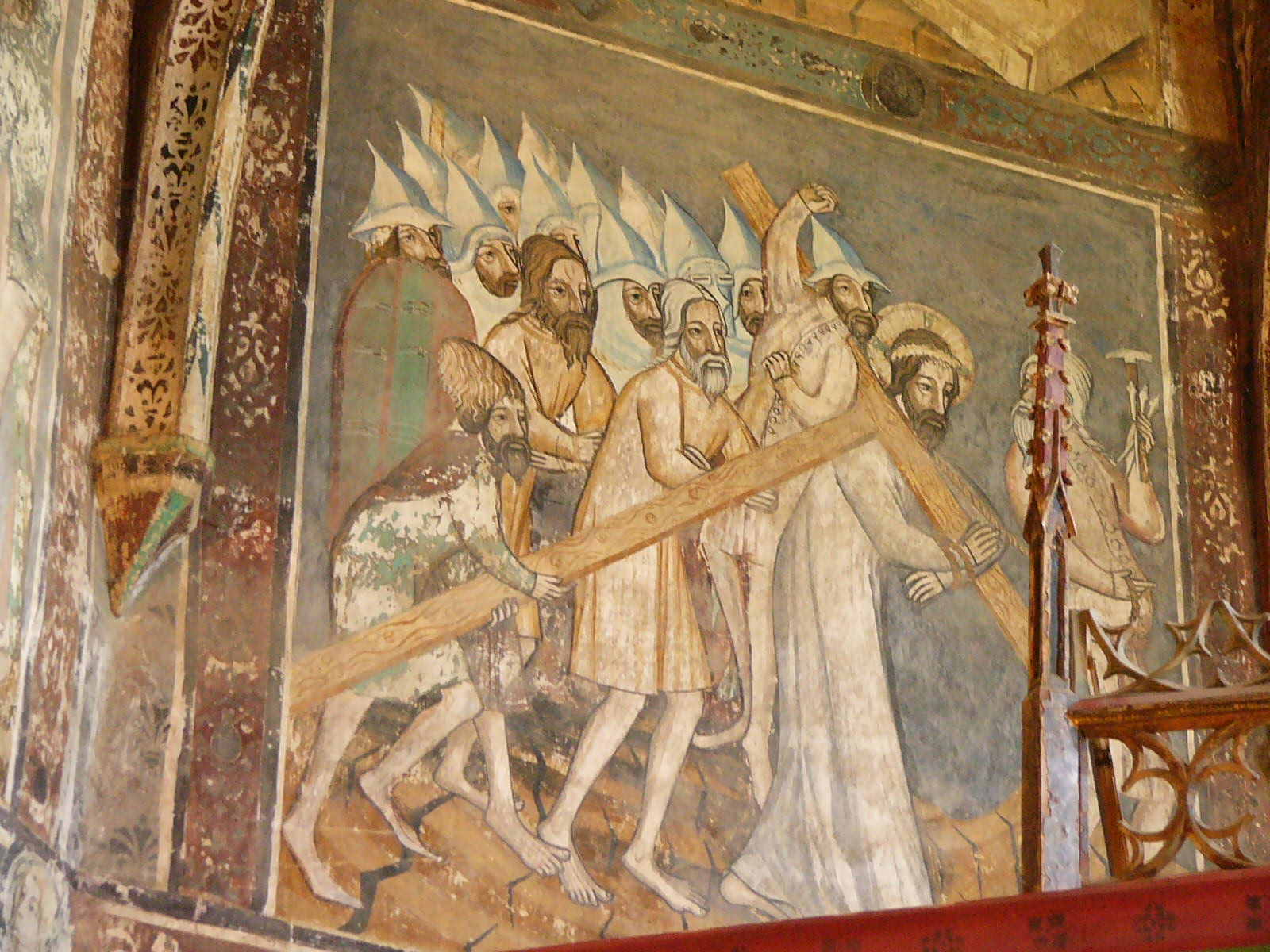
Jesus with the Cross on the Via Dolorosa (apse)

Hungarians saints: Bishop Gellert, King Ladislaus I, unknown, King Stephen I, his son Prince Emericus

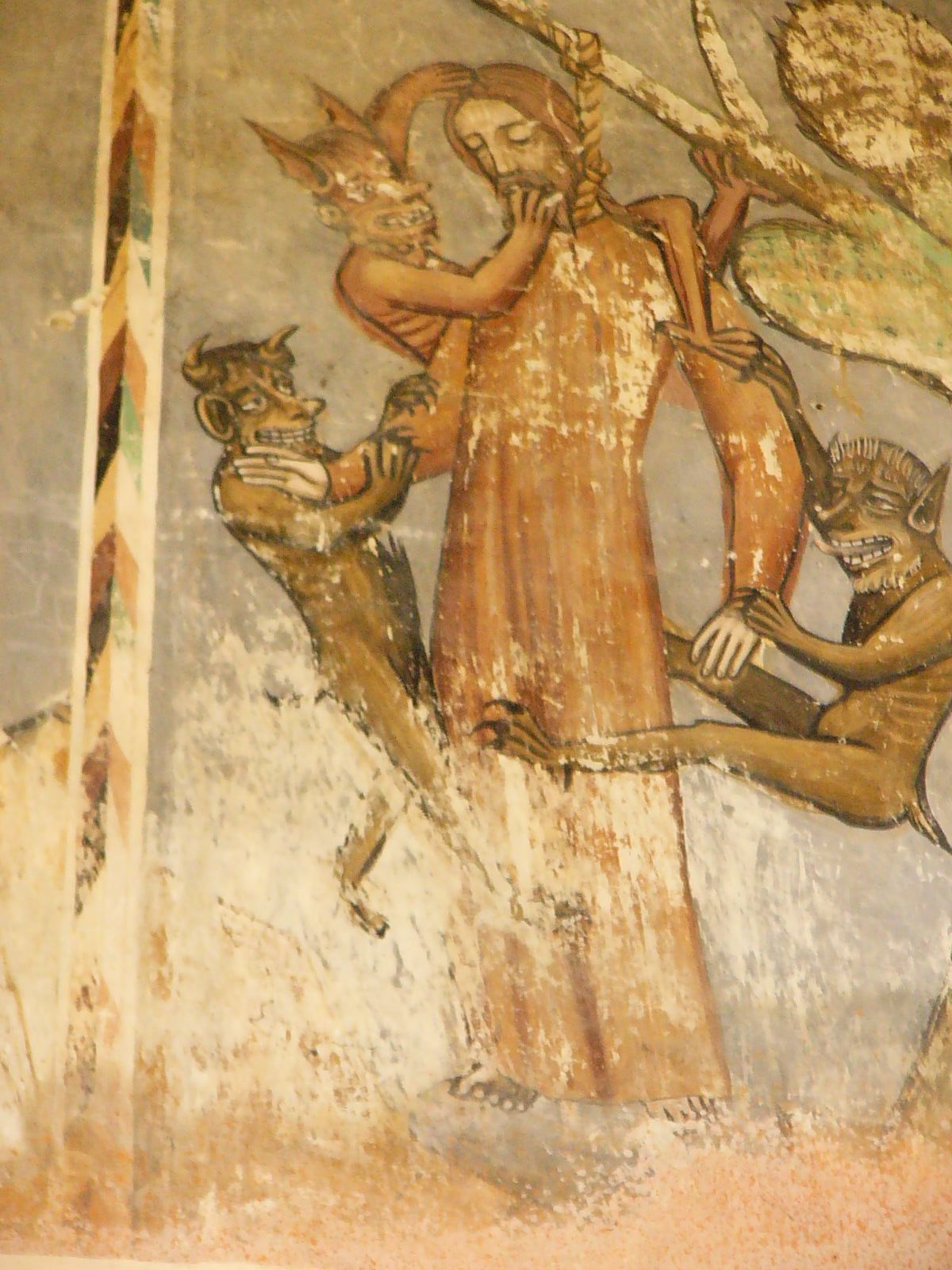
Hanging of Judas

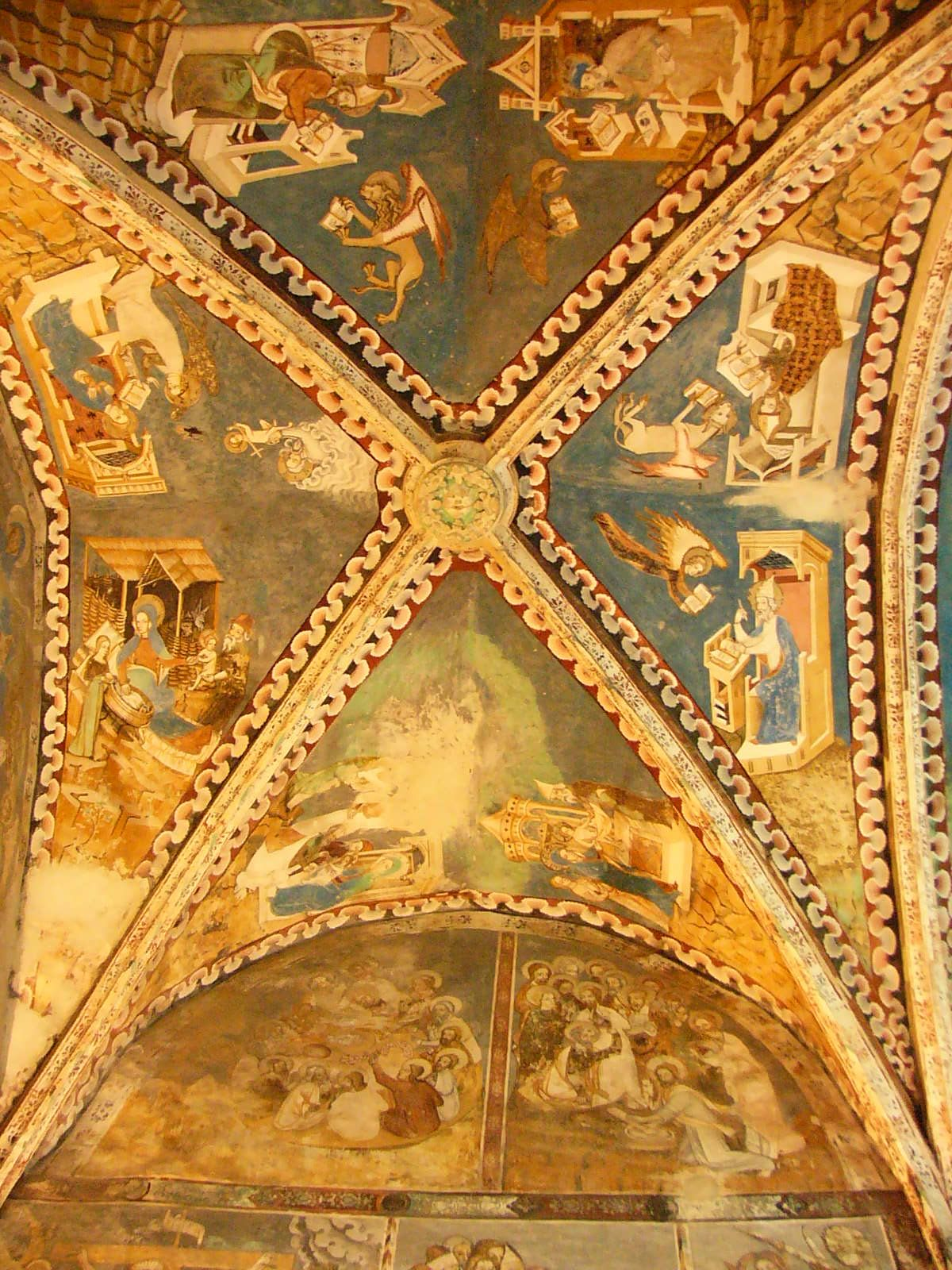
Ceiling. Around the keystone, from bottom left (cw): Nativity of Jesus, Annunciation, the Four Evangelists, Presentation in the Temple, ?

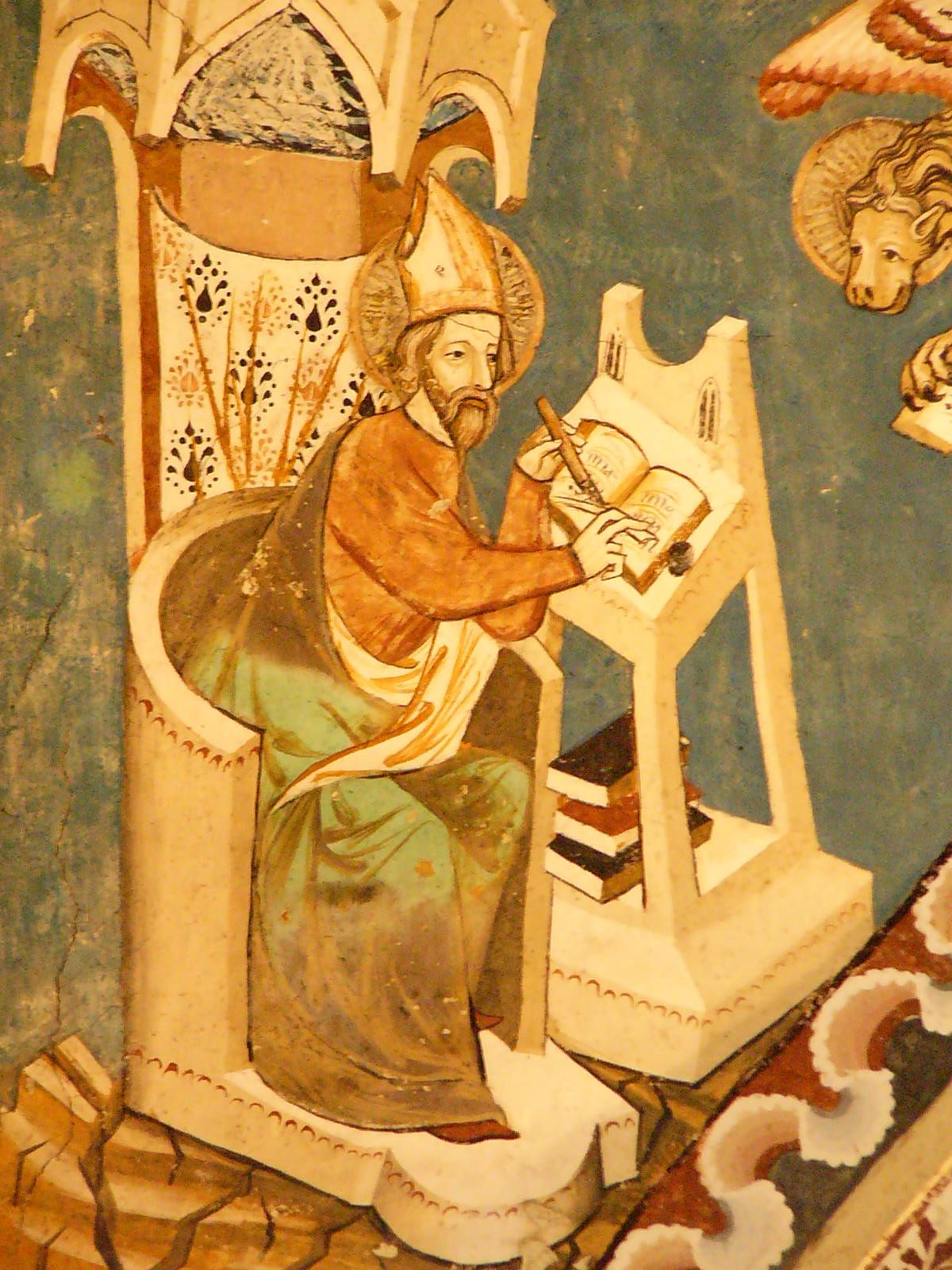
Mark the Evangelist (ceiling)

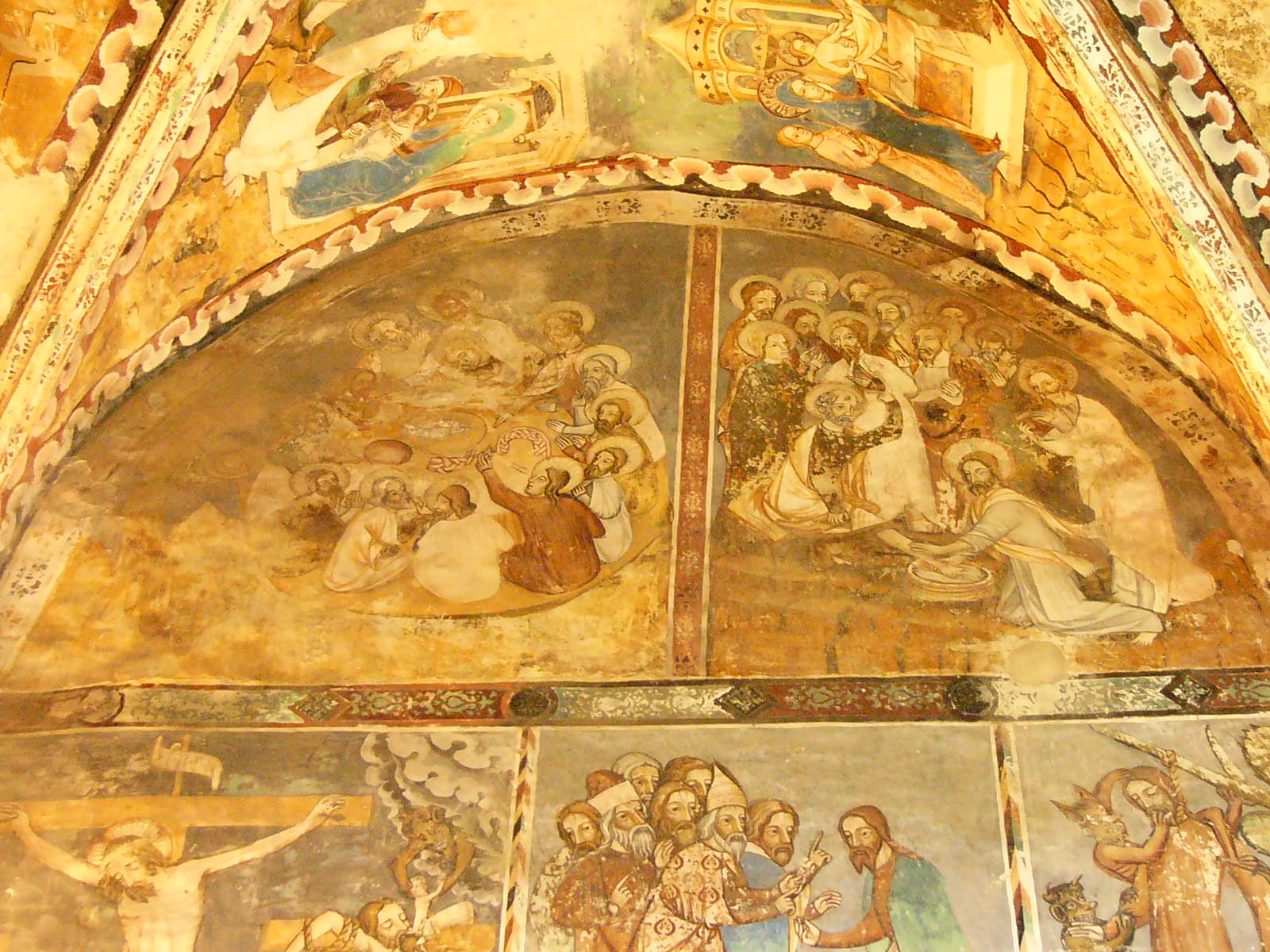
The Last Supper and Christ washing the apostles' feet

== See also ==
- Ghelința, St. Emeric Church: 13th-century murals
- Church on the Hill (Sighișoara), 14th-16th century murals
- Dârjiu, church murals from 1419
