= Transylvania =

Historical region in Central Europe

Coordinates: 46.5°N 24.5°E

Transylvania Transilvania (Romanian) Erdély (Hungarian) Siebenbürgen (German)
- Flag Coat of arms

- Transylvania proper Banat, Crișana and Maramureș Bukovina, Dobruja, Moldavia, Muntenia, and Oltenia
- Largest city: Cluj-Napoca
- Official languages: Romanian
- Recognised minority languages: See here: Albanian; Armenian; Bulgarian; Croatian; Czech; German; Greek; Italian; Macedonian; Hungarian; Polish; Romani; Russian; Ruthenian; Serbian; Slovak; Tatar; Turkish; Ukrainian; Yiddish
- Ethnic groups (2021): 76.42% Romanians; 17.36% Hungarians; 4.53% Roma; 1.69% others
- Religion (2021): 90.42% Christianity; 65.96% Romanian Orthodoxy; 15.04% Protestantism; 9.32% Catholicism; 2.10% other Christian; 0.27% undeclared / no religion; 0.0% no data; 8.31% others
- Demonym: Transylvanian

Establishment history

Area
  - Total: 100,291 km^{2} (38,723 sq mi) (Note: The sixteen counties that form the historical region of Transylvania.) (106th)
  - Water (%): 3

Population
  - January 2026 estimate: 6,519,995 (107th)
  - 2021 census: ▼6,461,780
  - Density: 65/km^{2} (168.3/sq mi) (122nd)
- GDP (nominal): 2025 estimate
  - Total: ▲$138.4 billion (64th)
  - Per capita: ▲$21,229 (55th)
- HDI (2022): ▲0.829 very high (33rd)
- Currency: Romanian leu (RON)
- Time zone: UTC+2 (EET)
  - Summer (DST): UTC+3 (EEST)
- Date format: dd.mm.yyyy (AD)
- Calling code: +40
- ISO 3166 code: RO
- Internet TLD: .ro^{a}
- 1. Also .eu, shared with other European Union member states

Transylvania is a historical and cultural region in Central Europe, encompassing central Romania. The region's natural border to the east and south is the Carpathian Mountains, and to the west it is the Apuseni Mountains. Broader definitions of Transylvania also include the western and northwestern Romanian regions of Crișana and Maramureș, and occasionally Banat. Historical Transylvania also includes small parts of neighbouring Western Moldavia and a small part of south-western neighbouring Bukovina to its north-east (represented by Suceava County).

Transylvania is known for the scenery of its Carpathian landscape and its rich history, along with its multi-cultural character. It also contains Romania's second-largest city, Cluj-Napoca, and other very well preserved medieval iconic cities and towns such as Brașov, Sibiu, Târgu Mureș, Bistrița, Alba Iulia, Mediaș, and Sighișoara. It is also the home of some of Romania's UNESCO World Heritage Sites such as the Villages with fortified churches, the Historic Centre of Sighișoara, the Dacian Fortresses of the Orăștie Mountains and the Roșia Montană Mining Cultural Landscape.

It was under the rule of the Agathyrsi, part of the Dacian Kingdom (168 BC – 106 AD), Roman Dacia (106–271), the Goths, the Hunnic Empire (4th–5th centuries), the Kingdom of the Gepids (5th–6th centuries), the Avar Khaganate (6th–9th centuries), the Slavs, and the 9th century First Bulgarian Empire. During the late 9th century, Transylvania was reached and conquered by the Hungarian tribes, and Gyula's family from the seven chieftains of the Hungarians ruled it in the 10th century. King Stephen I of Hungary asserted his claim to rule all lands dominated by Hungarian lords. He personally led his army against his maternal uncle Gyula III and Transylvania became part of the Kingdom of Hungary in 1002.

After the Battle of Mohács in 1526 it belonged to the Eastern Hungarian Kingdom, from which the Principality of Transylvania emerged in 1570 by the Treaty of Speyer. During most of the 16th and 17th centuries, the principality was a vassal state of the Ottoman Empire; however, the principality had dual suzerainty (Ottoman and Habsburg).

In 1690, the Habsburg monarchy gained possession of Transylvania through the Hungarian crown. After the failure of Rákóczi's War of Independence in 1711, Habsburg control of Transylvania was consolidated, and Hungarian Transylvanian princes were replaced with Habsburg imperial governors. During the Hungarian Revolution of 1848, the Hungarian government proclaimed union with Transylvania in the April Laws of 1848. After the failure of the revolution, the March Constitution of Austria decreed that the Principality of Transylvania be a separate crown land entirely independent of Hungary. The separate status of Transylvania ended with the Austro-Hungarian Compromise of 1867, and it was reincorporated into the Kingdom of Hungary (Transleithania) as part of the Austro-Hungarian Empire. It was also during this period that Romanians experienced the awakening of self-consciousness as a nation, manifested in cultural and ideological movements such as Transylvanian School, and drafted political petitions such as Supplex Libellus Valachorum. After World War I, the National Assembly of Romanians from Transylvania proclaimed the Union of Transylvania with Romania on 1 December 1918, and Transylvania became part of the Kingdom of Romania by the Treaty of Trianon in 1920. In 1940, Northern Transylvania reverted to Hungary as a result of the Second Vienna Award, but it was returned to Romania after the end of World War II.

In popular culture, Transylvania is commonly associated with vampires because of the influence of Bram Stoker's 1897 novel Dracula and the many subsequent books and films that the story has inspired. Many Transylvanian Saxons were furious with Vlad the Impaler for strengthening the borders of Wallachia, which interfered with their control of trade routes, and his extreme sadism and barbarity, by which a collection of credible historical accounts of diverse origins, most of which were non-Saxon, dealt with his enemies (including Saxons, large Boyars and Ottoman soldiers) by impaling. The victims were often arranged in grotesque displays intended to terrorize various groups, including the Saxons. In retaliation, the Saxons distributed poems of cruelty and other propaganda characterising the sadistic Vlad III Dracula as a drinker of blood.

== Etymology ==
The earliest known reference to Transylvania appears in a Medieval Latin document of the Kingdom of Hungary in 1078 as ultra silvam, meaning "beyond the forest" (ultra meaning "beyond" or "on the far side of" and the accusative case of sylva (sylvam) "woods, forest"). Transylvania, with an alternative Latin prepositional prefix, means "on the other side of the woods". The Medieval Latin form Ultrasylvania, later Transylvania, was a direct translation from the Hungarian form Erdő-elve, later Erdély, which has been adopted phonetically into Romanian as Ardeal. That also was used as an alternative name in German überwald ("beyond the forest") (13th–14th centuries) and Ukrainian Залісся (Zalissia).

The German name Siebenbürgen means "seven castles", after the seven (ethnic German) Transylvanian Saxons' cities in the region. This is also the origin of the region's name in many other languages, such as the Croatian Sedmogradska, the Bulgarian Седмиградско (Sedmigradsko), Polish Siedmiogród, Yiddish זיבנבערגן (Zibnbergn), and Ukrainian Семигород (Semyhorod).

The Hungarian form Erdély was first mentioned in the 12th-century Gesta Hungarorum as Erdeuleu (in modern script Erdeüleü) or Erdő-elve. The word erdő means forest in Hungarian, and the word elve denotes a region in connection with this, similarly to the Hungarian name for Muntenia (Havas-elve, or land lying ahead of the snow-capped mountains). Erdel, Erdil, Erdelistan are derived from Hungarian Erdély.

An occurrence of the form Ardeliu in a Church Slavonic document written by a Romanian chancellery is attested in 1432. The Romanian Ardeal is derived from the Hungarian Erdély.

Historical names of Transylvania are:

- Bulgarian: Седмиградско, romanized: Sedmigradsko, Трансилвания Transilvanija
- Croatian: Sedmogradska, Erdelj (hist.), Transilvanija
- German: Siebenbürgen ([ziːbm̩ˈbʏʁɡŋ̍]), Transsilvanien
- Hungarian: Erdély ([ˈɛrdeːj])
- Latin: Ultrasilvania, Transsilvania
- Polish: Siedmiogród, Transylwania
- Romani: Transilvaniya
- Romanian: Ardeal ([arˈde̯al]), Transilvania ([transilˈvani.a])
- Russian: Трансильвания, romanized: Transil'vaniya, Седмиградье
- Serbian: Ердељ/Erdelj, Serbian: Трансилванија/Transilvanija
- Slovak: Ardieľ, Sedmohradsko
- Transylvanian Saxon: Siweberjen
- Turkish: Erdel
- Ukrainian: Семигород, romanized: Semyhorod, Залісся Zalissiya, Трансильванія Transyl'vaniya
- Yiddish: זיבנבערגן, romanized: Zibnbergn, זימבערגן Zimbergn, טראַנסילוואַניע Transilvanye

== History ==
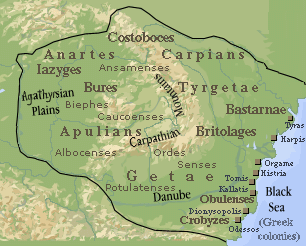
Map of Dacia under Burebista

The first known civilization to inhabit the territory was the Agathyrsi, of the Scythic cultures. From the 4th century BC, Celtic La Tène culture came to domination. The indigenous Dacian tribes engaged in politics from the 1st century BC and united under King Burebista, forming their kingdom Dacia.

The Roman Empire made heavy efforts to seize the territory from King Decebalus, resulting in the formation of Roman Dacia in 106, after Trajan's costly and bloody wars. During Roman rule, the territory, depleted of its indigenous population, was repopulated with Latin colonists and its rich resource stock was systematically exploited. However, the growing threat of East Germanic and Carpic invasions made Emperor Aurelian withdraw his legions and evacuate the citizens south of the Lower Danube in 275, when the province became occupied by the Goths. In 376, a powerful nomadic people, the Huns, defeated and shattered the Goths, and settled in the area. After the death of Hun King Attila, their empire disintegrated and the Gepids conquered the region in 455, under King Ardaric.

=== Gepids, Franks ===
For two centuries, the Gepids controlled Transylvania. The Ostrogoths systematically pushed the Gepids out of Pannonia. King Elemund, on the other hand, successfully fought battles against the Eastern Roman Empire. They were defeated by the Lombards and Avars in 567. In the following years, the Avars took full control over Transylvania, heavily settling the area with Slavic tribes who accepted their suzerainty. The expansion of the Frankish Empire, however, constituted a growing threat and the Avar khaganate was crushed in the Avar Wars. The Avars and Slavs, although substantially depleted in number, continued to inhabit the Carpathian Basin. The First Bulgarian Empire expanded into Southern Transylvania in the 9th century. Smaller Slavic polities were also present, nevertheless they could hardly keep their independence.

=== Erdély, as the part of the Hungarian Kingdom ===
In the late 9th century, Transylvania was reached and conquered by the Hungarian conquerors. There is an ongoing scholarly debate over the demographics in Transylvania at the time. According to the theory of Daco-Roman continuity, Romanians continuously lived on the territory. Opponents of that hypothesis point to the lack of written, archaeological and linguistic evidence to support it. Hungarian medieval chronicles claimed that the Székely people descended from the Huns, who remained in Transylvania, and later, in combination with the returning Hungarians, conquered the Carpathian Basin. According to the Gesta Hungarorum, the Vlach (Blacorum, Blacus) leader Gelou ruled part of Transylvania before the Hungarians arrived. Historians debate whether he was a historical person or an imaginary figure. The gyulas from the seven chieftains of the Hungarians governed Transylvania in the 10th century. King Stephen I of Hungary asserted his claim to rule all lands dominated by Hungarian lords. He personally led his army against his maternal uncle Gyula III and Transylvania became part of the Kingdom of Hungary in 1002. Place names derived from the Hungarian tribes evidence that major Hungarian groups settled in Transylvania from the 950s. In the 12th and 13th centuries, Southeast and Northeast Transylvania was settled by Saxon colonists. In Romanian historiography, Romanians constituted an important part of Transylvania's population even on the eve of the Mongol Invasions. Hungarian historiography claims that the Vlach population entered Transylvania from the Balkans only in the 12th century, and the devastating invasion of Mongols had also as consequence the large-scale immigration by Romanians, however the immigration of Romanians did not happen all at once, the process of settlement stretched over several centuries. After the Battle of Kosovo and Ottoman arrival at the Hungarian border, thousands of Vlach and Serbian refugees came to Transylvania.

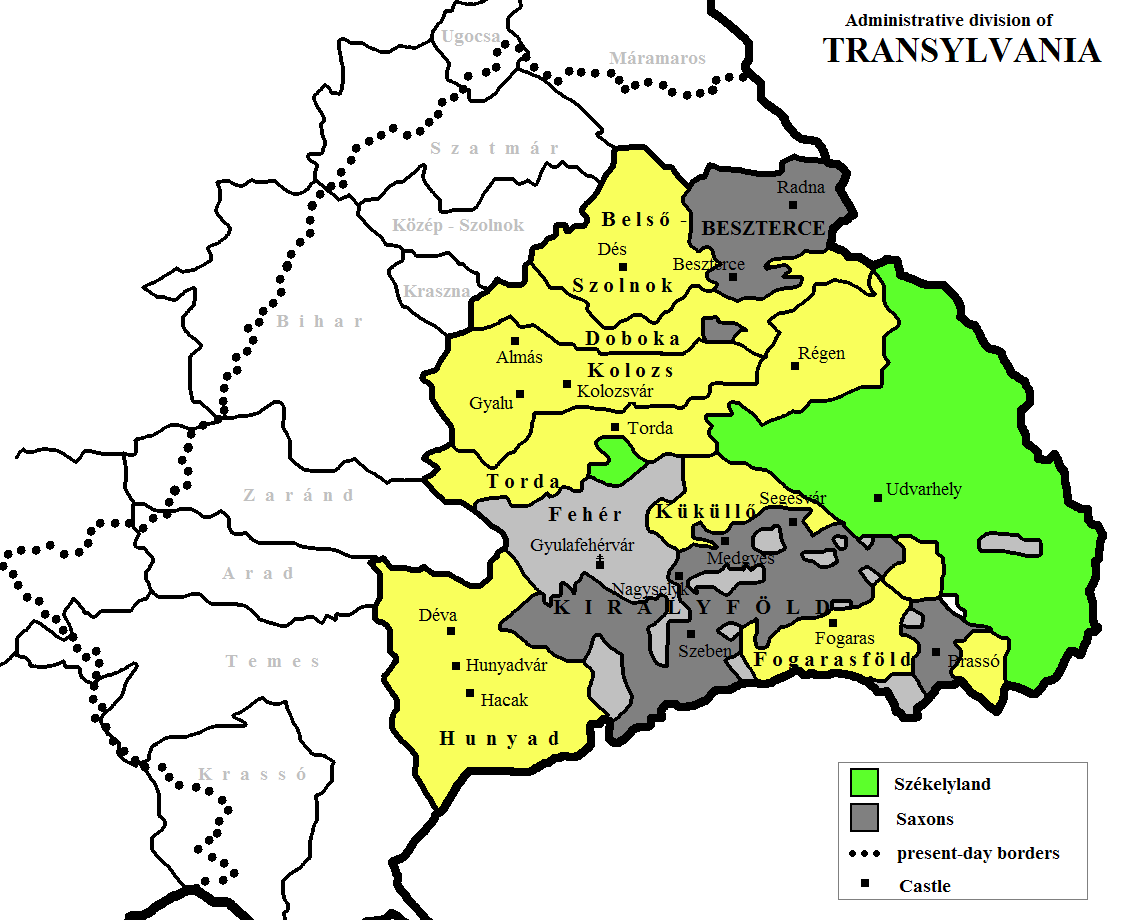
Administrative divisions in Eastern Hungary, Voivodate of Transylvania is in color

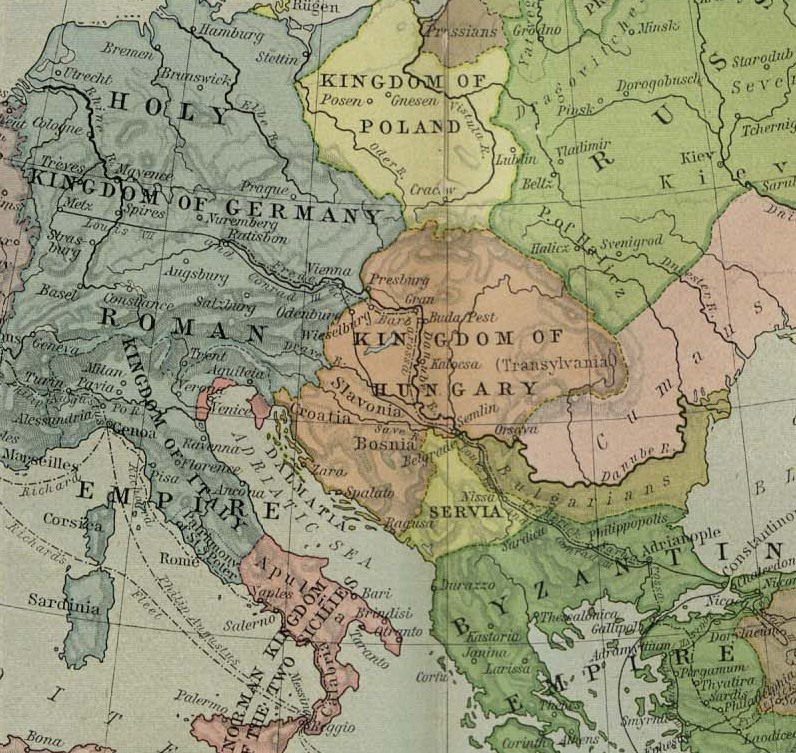
Kingdom of Hungary in 1190, during the rule of Béla III

Between 1002 and 1526, Transylvania was part of the Kingdom of Hungary, led by a voivode appointed by the King of Hungary. After the Battle of Mohács in 1526, Transylvania became part of the Eastern Hungarian Kingdom. Later, in 1570, the kingdom became the Principality of Transylvania by the Treaty of Speyer, which was ruled primarily by Calvinist Hungarian princes. The Eastern Hungarian king became the first prince of Transylvania, according to the treaty. The Principality of Transylvania continued to be part of the Kingdom of Hungary in the sense of public law, which stressed in a highly significant way that John Sigismund's possessions belonged to the Holy Crown of Hungary and he was not permitted to alienate them.

Administrative map of the Principality of Transylvania in 1606–1660

The Habsburgs acquired the territory shortly after the Battle of Vienna in 1683. In 1687, the rulers of Transylvania recognized the suzerainty of the Habsburg emperor Leopold I, and the region was officially attached to the Habsburg Empire. The Habsburgs acknowledged the Principality of Transylvania as one of the Lands of the Crown of Saint Stephen, but the territory of the principality was administratively separated from Habsburg Hungary, and subjected to the direct rule of the emperor's governors. In 1699 the Ottomans legally acknowledged their loss of Transylvania in the Treaty of Karlowitz; however, some anti-Habsburg elements within the principality submitted to the emperor only in the 1711 Peace of Szatmár, when Habsburg control over Principality of Transylvania was consolidated. The Grand Principality of Transylvania was reintroduced 54 years later in 1765.

The Hungarian revolution against the Habsburgs started in 1848, and grew into a war for the total independence of the Kingdom of Hungary from the Habsburg dynasty. Julius Jacob von Haynau, the leader of the Austrian army, was appointed plenipotentiary to restore order in Hungary after the conflict. He ordered the execution of The 13 Hungarian Martyrs of Arad, and Prime Minister Batthyány was executed the same day in Pest. After a series of serious Austrian defeats in 1849, the empire came close to the brink of collapse. Thus, the new young emperor Franz Joseph I had to call for Russian help under the Holy Alliance. Czar Nicholas I answered, and sent an army of 200,000 men with 80,000 auxiliary forces. Finally, the joint army of Russian and Austrian forces defeated the Hungarian forces. After the restoration of Habsburg power, Hungary was placed under martial law. Following the Hungarian Army's surrender at Világos (now Șiria, Romania) in 1849, their revolutionary banners were taken to Russia by the Tsarist troops and were kept there both under the Tsarist and Communist systems (in 1940 the Soviet Union offered the banners to the Horthy government).

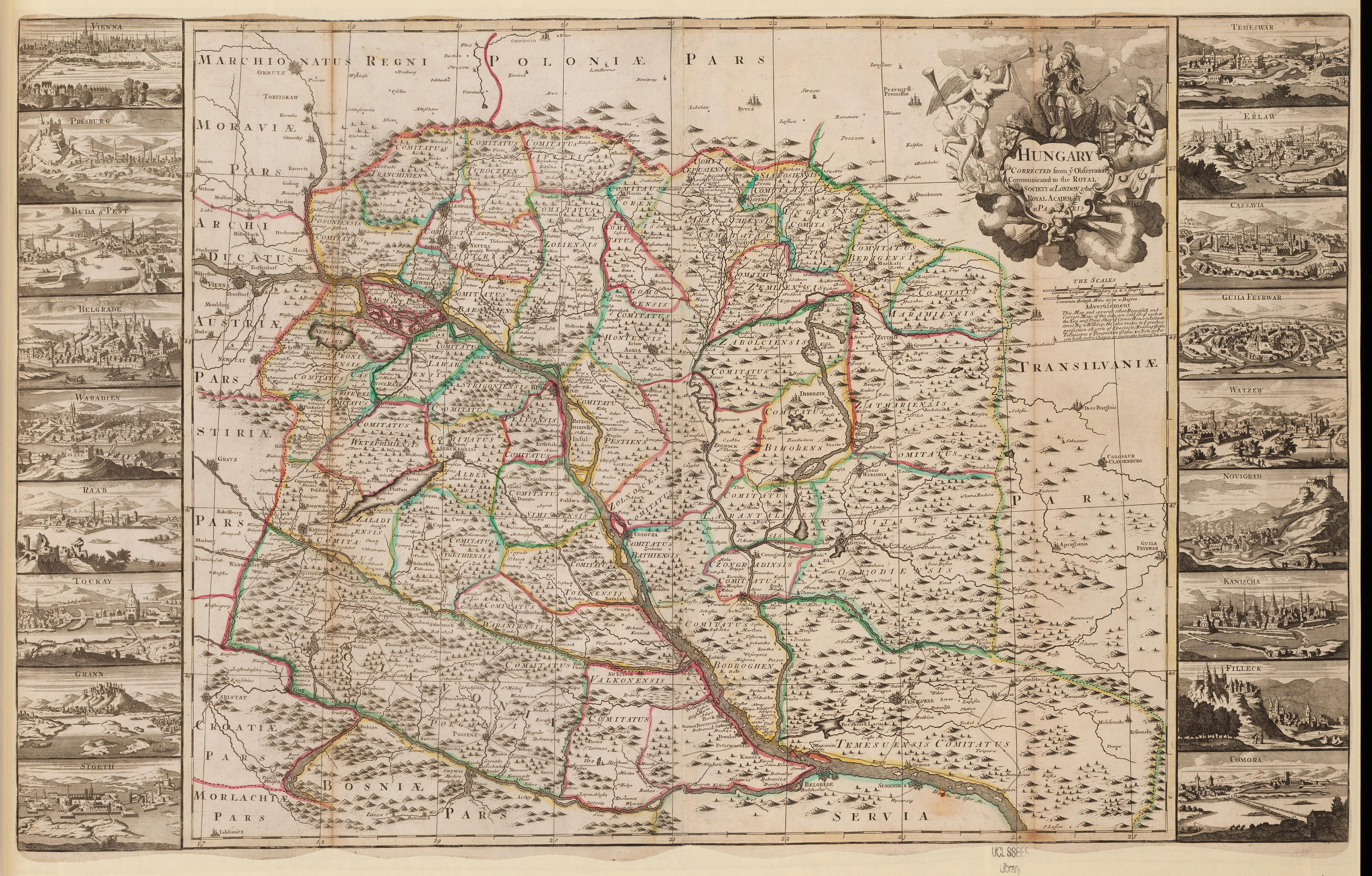
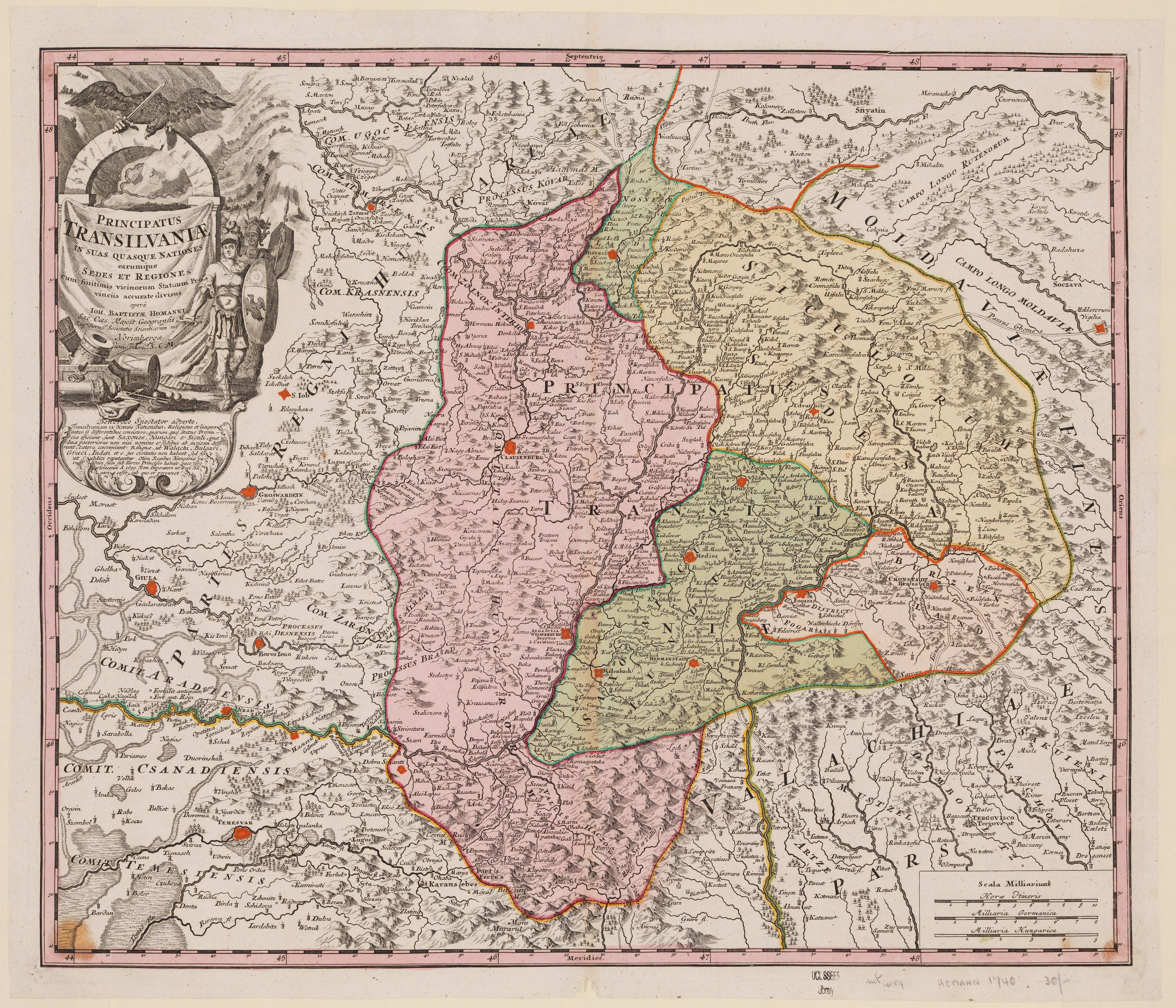
1700s maps of the Kingdom of Hungary and Transylvania

After the Ausgleich of 1867, the Principality of Transylvania was once again abolished. The territory then became part of Transleithania, an addition to the newly established Austro-Hungarian Empire. Romanian intellectuals issued the Blaj Pronouncement in protest.

The region was the site of an important battle during World War I, which caused the replacement of the German Chief of Staff, temporarily ceased German offensives on all the other fronts and created a unified Central Powers command under the German Kaiser. Following defeat in World War I, Austria-Hungary disintegrated. Elected representatives of the ethnic Romanians from Transylvania, Banat, Crișana and Maramureș backed by the mobilization of Romanian troops, proclaimed Union with Romania on 1 December 1918. The Proclamation of Union of Alba Iulia was adopted by the Deputies of the Romanians from Transylvania and supported one month later by the vote of the Deputies of the Saxons from Transylvania.

Romania's territorial losses in 1940, showing Northern Transylvania being ceded to Hungary. The region was returned to Romania after World War II.

=== After the collapse of the Austrian-Hungarian Monarchy ===
The national holiday of Romania, the Great Union Day (also called Unification Day,) occurring on 1 December, was established after the Romanian Revolution, and marks the unification not only of Transylvania but also of the provinces of Banat, Bessarabia and Bukovina with the Romanian Kingdom. These other provinces had all joined the Kingdom of Romania a few months earlier. In 1920, the Treaty of Trianon established new borders and much of the proclaimed territories became part of Romania. Hungary protested against the new state borders, which failed to follow the ethnic boundaries for over 1.3 or 1.6 million Hungarian people, representing 25.5 or 31.6% of the Transylvanian population (depending on statistics used), were living on the Romanian side of the border, mainly in the Székely Land of Eastern Transylvania, and along the newly created border.

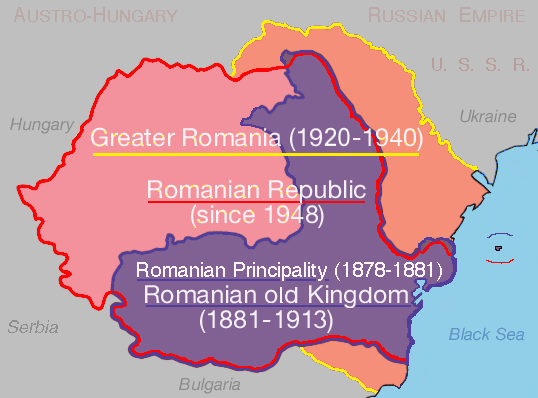
Territorial evolution of Romania in the 20th century, excluding changes during World War II

In August 1940, with the arbitration of Germany and Italy under the Second Vienna Award, Hungary gained Northern Transylvania (including parts of Crișana and Maramureș), and over 40% of the territory lost in 1920. This award did not solve the nationality problem, as over 1.15–1.3 million Romanians (or 48% to more than 50% of the population of the ceded territory) remained in Northern Transylvania while 0.36–0.8 million Hungarians (or 11% to more than 20% of the population) continued to reside in Southern Transylvania. Following the Nazi invasion of Hungary in March 1944, Northern Transylvania came under German control. Over the next 3 months, the region's Jewish population was systematically concentrated in ghettos before being deported to the Auschwitz death camp, where the vast majority were murdered. The Second Vienna Award was voided on 12 September 1944 by the Allied Commission through the Armistice Agreement with Romania (Article 19), and the 1947 Treaty of Paris reaffirmed the borders between Romania and Hungary as originally defined in the Treaty of Trianon, 27 years earlier, thus confirming the return of Northern Transylvania to Romania.

From 1947 to 1989, Transylvania, along with the rest of Romania, was under a communist regime. The ethnic clashes of Târgu Mureș between ethnic Romanians and Hungarians in March 1990 took place after the fall of the communist regime and became the most notable inter-ethnic incident in the post-communist era, followed by the 2019 ethnic disputes over the military cemetery of Valea Uzului.

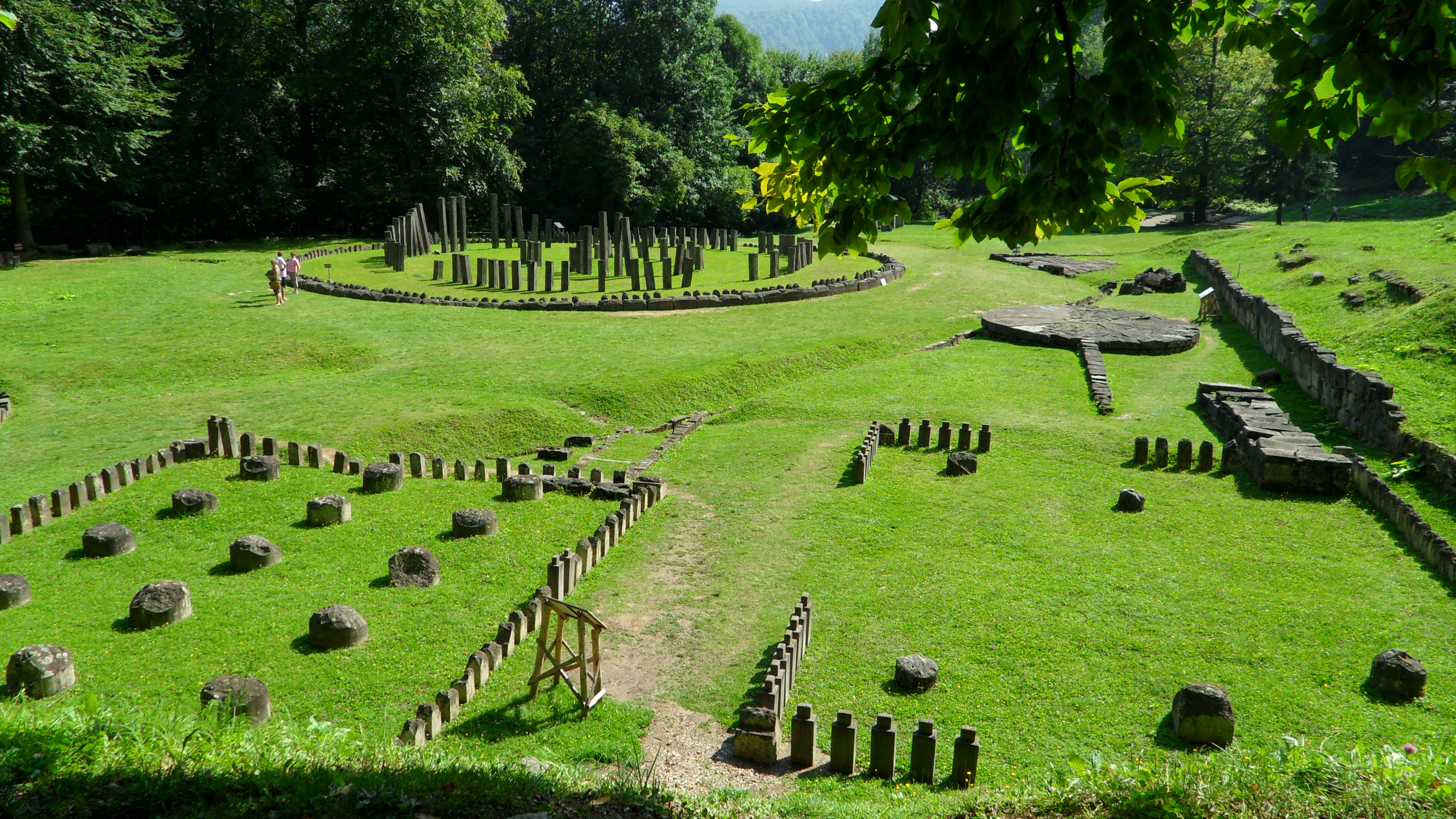
Ruins of Sarmizegetusa Regia

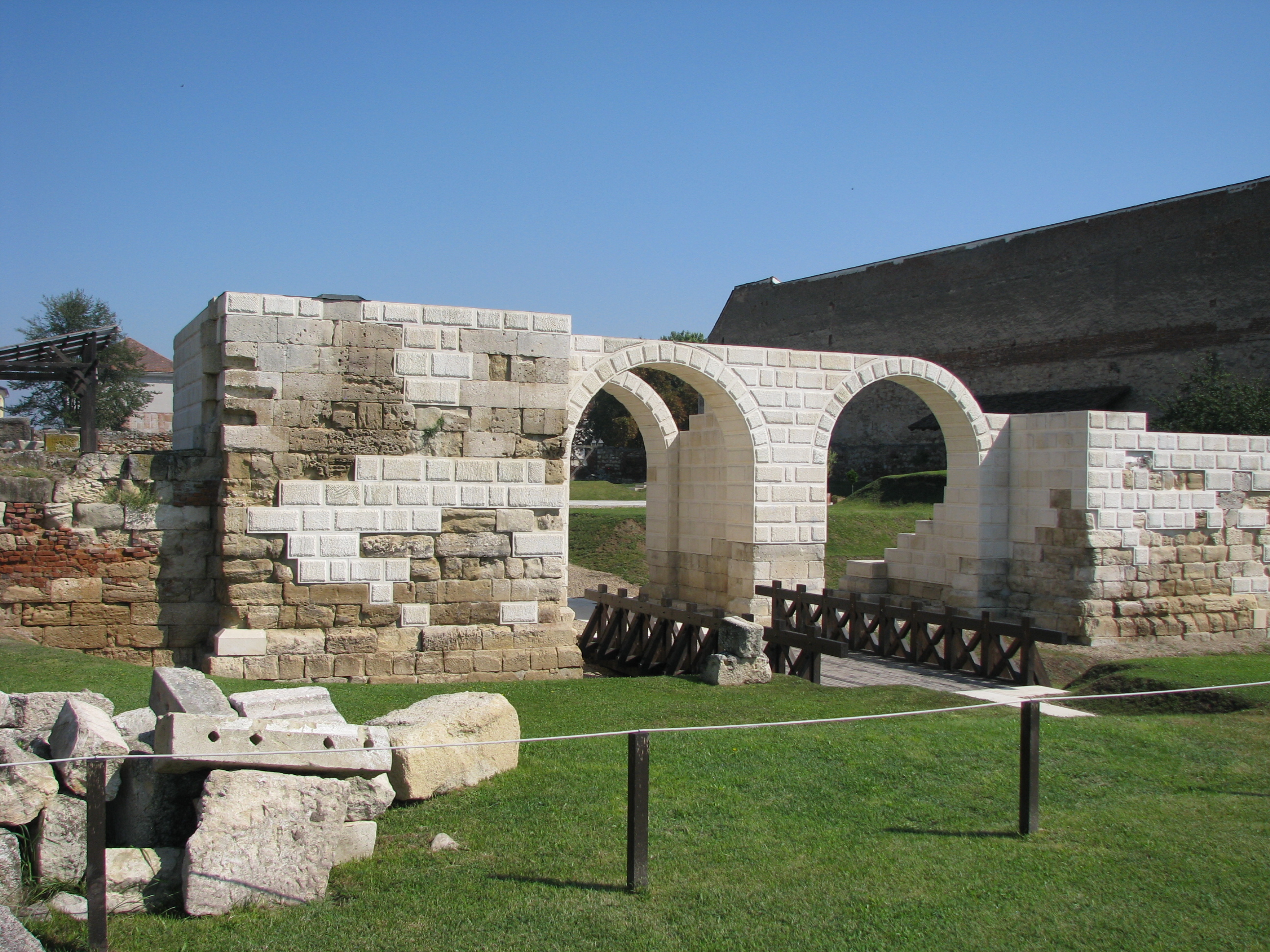
Roman city of Apulum

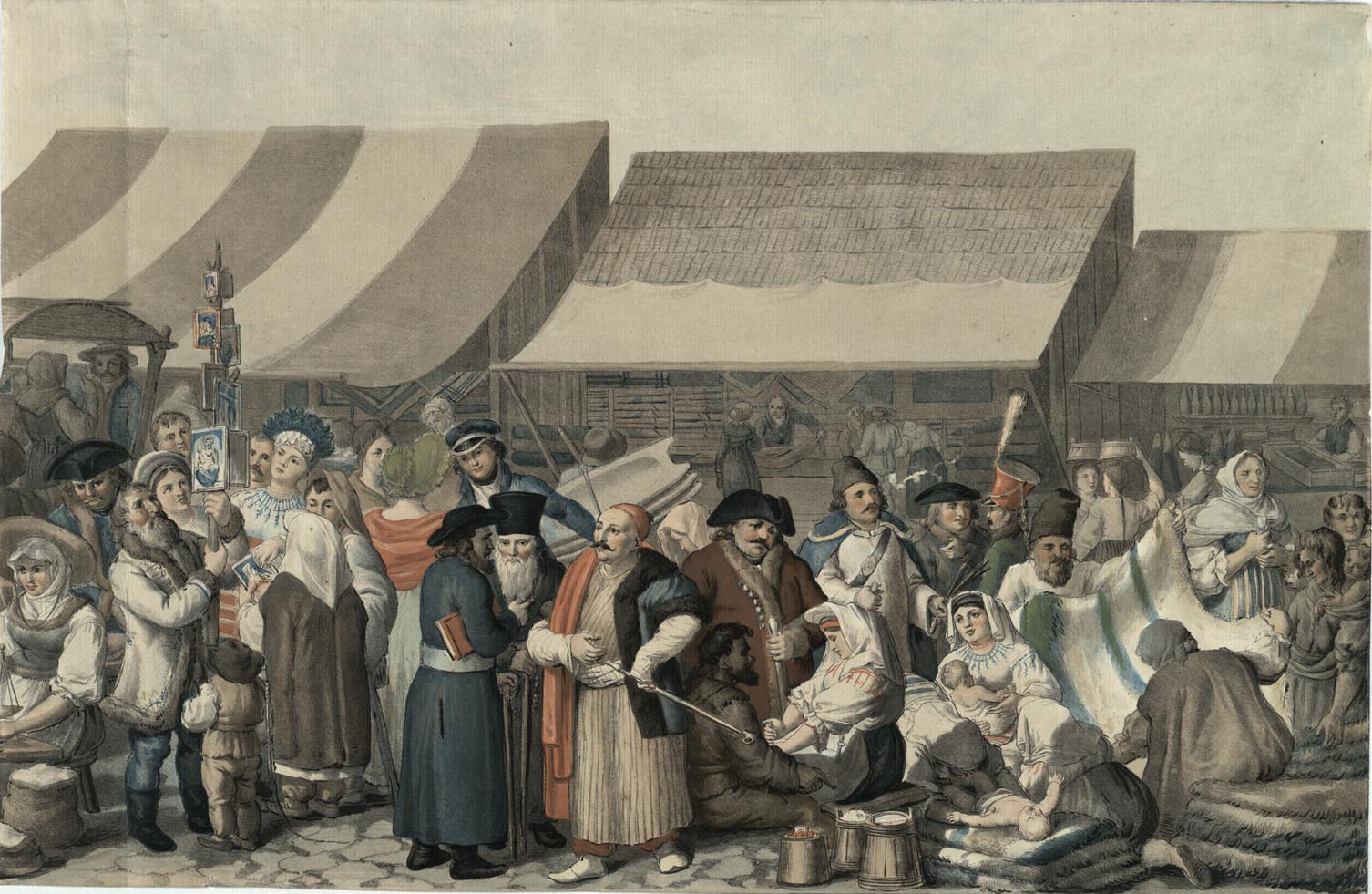
A market scene in Transylvania, 1818

The National Assembly in Alba Iulia (December 1, 1918), declaring the Union of Transylvania with Romania

== Geography and ethnography ==
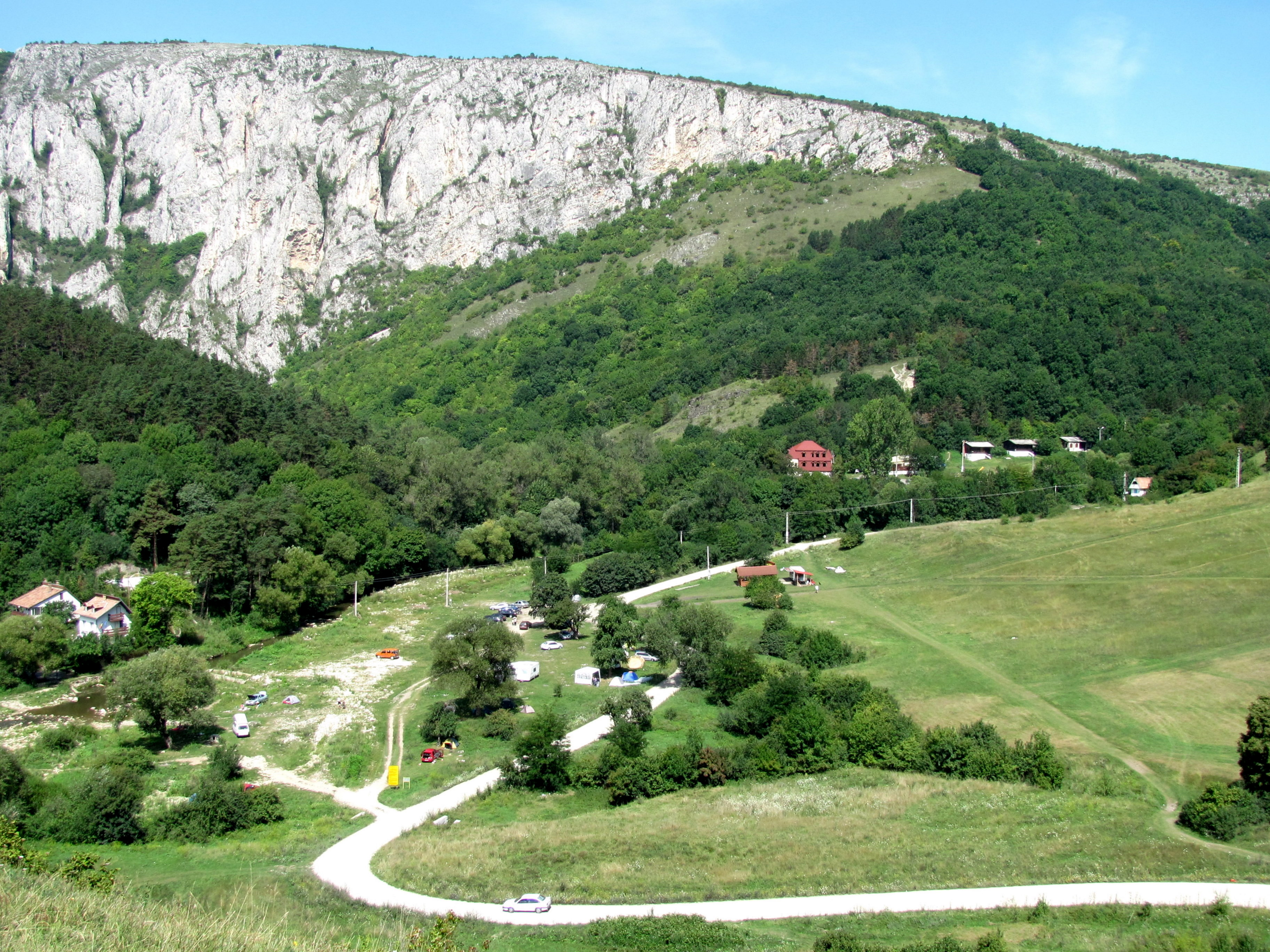
Turda Gorges seen from the west end, in Cluj county

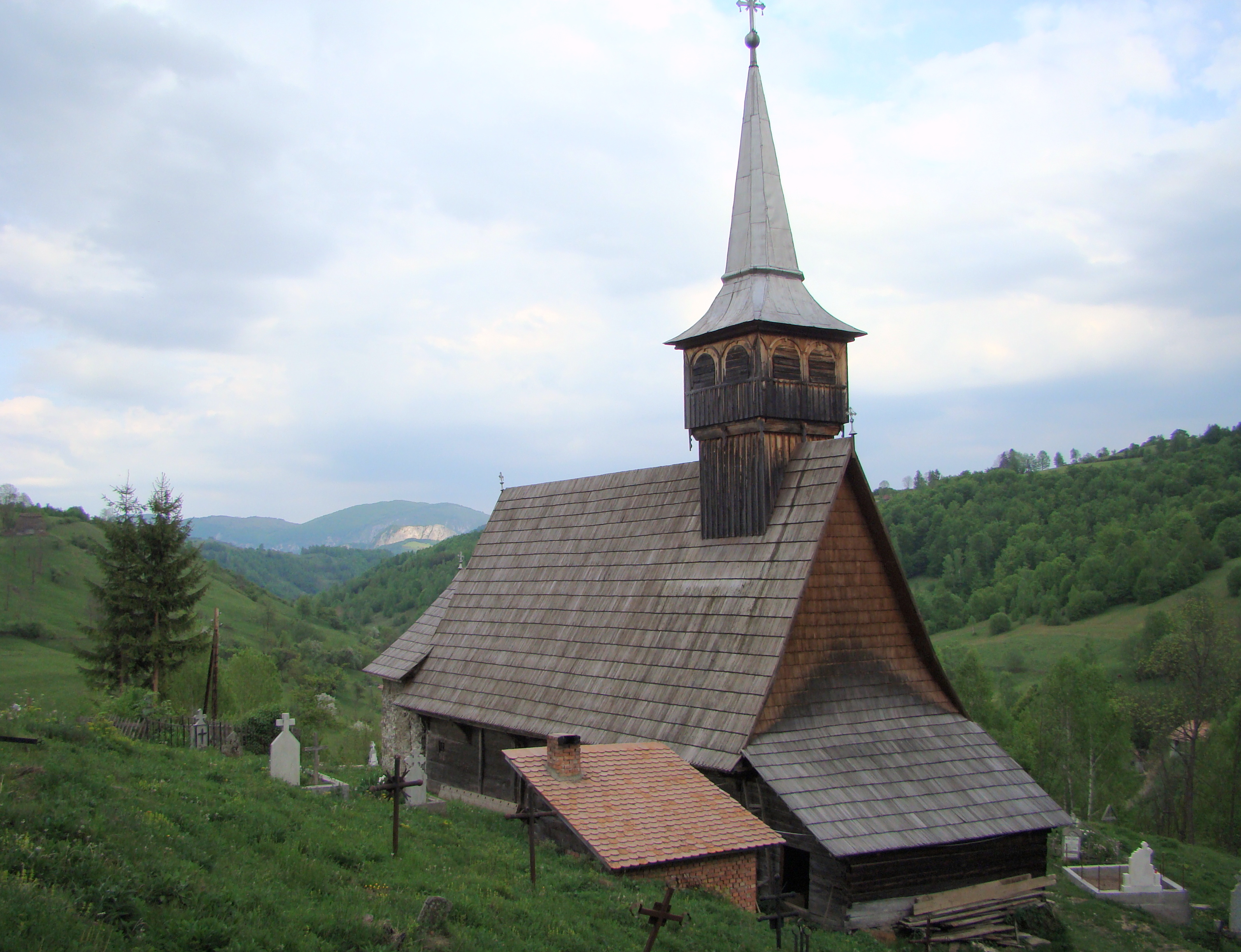
Geogel, Romanian Orthodox wooden church

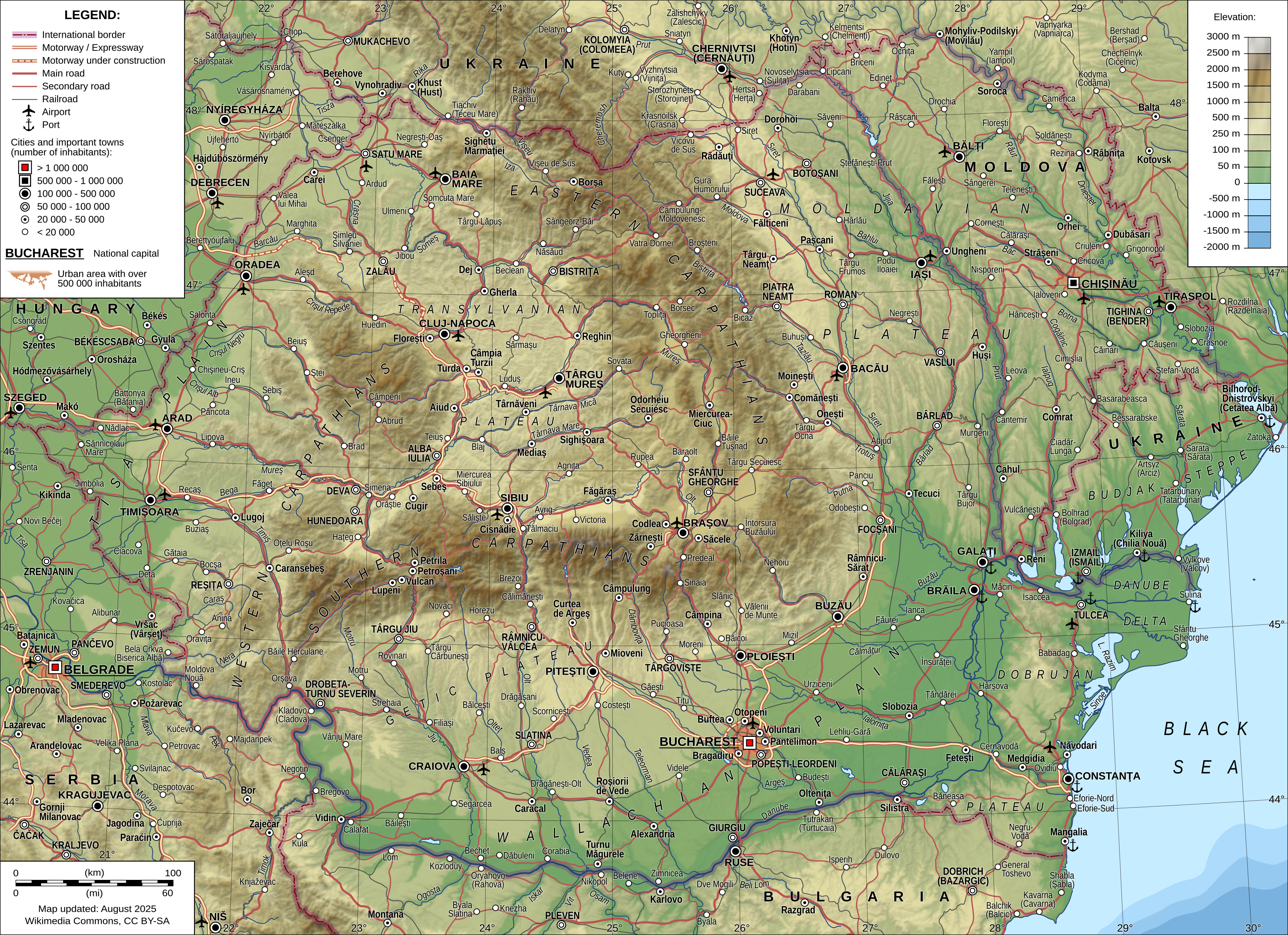
Geographical map of Romania

The Transylvanian Plateau, 300 to 500 metres (980–1,640 feet) high, is drained by the Mureș, Someș, Criș, and Olt rivers, as well as other tributaries of the Danube. This core of historical Transylvania roughly corresponds with nine counties of modern Romania. The plateau is almost entirely surrounded by the Eastern, Southern and Romanian Western branches of the Carpathian Mountains. The area includes the Transylvanian Plain. Other areas to the west and north are widely considered part of Transylvania; in common reference, the Western border of Transylvania has come to be identified with the present Romanian-Hungarian border, settled in the 1920 Treaty of Trianon, although geographically the two are not identical.

Ethnographic areas:

- Transylvania proper:
  - Mărginimea Sibiului (Szeben-hegyalja)
  - Transylvanian Plain (Câmpia Transilvaniei/Mezőség)
  - Țara Bârsei (Burzenland/Barcaság)
  - Țara Buzaielor
  - Țara Călatei (Kalotaszeg)
  - Țara Chioarului (Kővár)
  - Țara Făgărașului (Fogaras)
  - Țara Hațegului (Hátszeg)
  - Țara Hălmagiului
  - Țara Mocanilor
  - Țara Moților
  - Țara Năsăudului (Nösnerland/Naszód vidéke)
  - Țara Silvaniei
  - Ținutul Pădurenilor
  - Ținutul Secuiesc (Székelyföld/Székely Land)
- Banat
  - Țara Almăjului
- Crișana
  - Țara Zarandului
- Maramureș
  - Țara Oașului (Avasság)
  - Țara Lăpușului (Lápos-vidék)

== Administrative divisions ==

Light yellow – historical region of Transylvania
Dark yellow – historical regions of Banat, Crișana and Maramureș
Grey – historical regions of Wallachia, Moldavia and Dobruja

The area of the historical voivodeship is 55,146 km^{2} (21,292 sq mi). The regions granted to Romania in 1920 covered 23 counties including nearly 102,200 km^{2} (39,460 sq mi) (102,787–103,093 km^{2} in Hungarian sources and 102,282 km^{2} in contemporary Romanian documents). Nowadays, several administrative reorganisations make the territory cover 16 counties (Romanian: județ), with an area of 100,290 km^{2} (38,722 sq mi), in central and northwest Romania.

The 16 counties are: Alba, Arad, Bihor, Bistrița-Năsăud, Brașov, Caraș-Severin, Cluj, Covasna, Harghita, Hunedoara, Maramureș, Mureș, Sălaj, Satu Mare, Sibiu, and Timiș.

Transylvania contains both largely urban counties, such as Brașov and Hunedoara counties, as well as largely rural ones, such as Bistrița-Năsăud and Sălaj counties.

Since 1998, Romania has been divided into eight development regions, acting as divisions that coordinate and implement socio-economic development at regional level. Six counties (Alba, Brașov, Covasna, Harghita, Mureș and Sibiu) form the Centru development region, another six (Bihor, Bistrița-Năsăud, Cluj, Maramureș, Satu Mare, Sălaj) form the Nord-Vest development region, while four (Arad, Caraș-Severin, Hunedoara, Timiș) form the Vest development region.

== Cities and towns ==
Largest cities of Transylvania, Banat, Crișana and Maramureș historical regions in Romania "NIS 2021 Census" (2021 population by place of residence)
Rank	Name	County	Pop.	Rank	Name	County	Pop.
1	Cluj-Napoca	Cluj	286,598	11	Alba Iulia	Alba	64,227
2	Timișoara	Timiș	250,849	12	Reșița	Caraș-Severin	58,393
3	Brașov	Brașov	237,589	13	Deva	Hunedoara	53,113
4	Oradea	Bihor	183,105	14	Zalău	Sălaj	52,359
5	Arad	Arad	145,078	15	Hunedoara	Hunedoara	50,457
6	Sibiu	Sibiu	134,309	16	Sfântu Gheorghe	Covasna	50,080
7	Târgu Mureș	Mureș	116,033	17	Turda	Cluj	43,319
8	Baia Mare	Maramureș	108,759	18	Mediaș	Sibiu	39,505
9	Satu Mare	Satu Mare	91,520	19	Lugoj	Timiș	35,450
10	Bistrița	Bistrița-Năsăud	78,877	20	Miercurea Ciuc	Harghita	34,484

Cluj-Napoca, commonly known as Cluj, is the second most populous city in Romania (as of the 2021 census), after the national capital Bucharest, and is the seat of Cluj County. From 1790 to 1848 and from 1861 to 1867, it was the official capital of the Grand Principality of Transylvania. Brașov is an important tourist destination, being the largest city in a mountain resorts area, and a central location, suitable for exploring Romania, with the distances to several tourist destinations (including the Black Sea resorts, the monasteries in northern Moldavia, and the wooden churches of Maramureș) being similar.

Sibiu is one of the most important cultural centres of Romania and was designated the European Capital of Culture for the year 2007, along with the city of Luxembourg. It was formerly the centre of the Transylvanian Saxon culture and between 1692 and 1791 and 1849–65 was the capital of the Principality of Transylvania.

Alba Iulia, a city located on the Mureș River in Alba County, has since the High Middle Ages been the seat of Transylvania's Roman Catholic diocese. Between 1541 and 1690 it was the capital of the Eastern Hungarian Kingdom and the later Principality of Transylvania. Alba Iulia also has historical importance: after the end of World War I, representatives of the Romanian population of Transylvania gathered in Alba Iulia on 1 December 1918 to proclaim the union of Transylvania with the Kingdom of Romania. In Transylvania, there are many medieval smaller towns such as Sighișoara, Mediaș, Sebeș, and Bistrița.

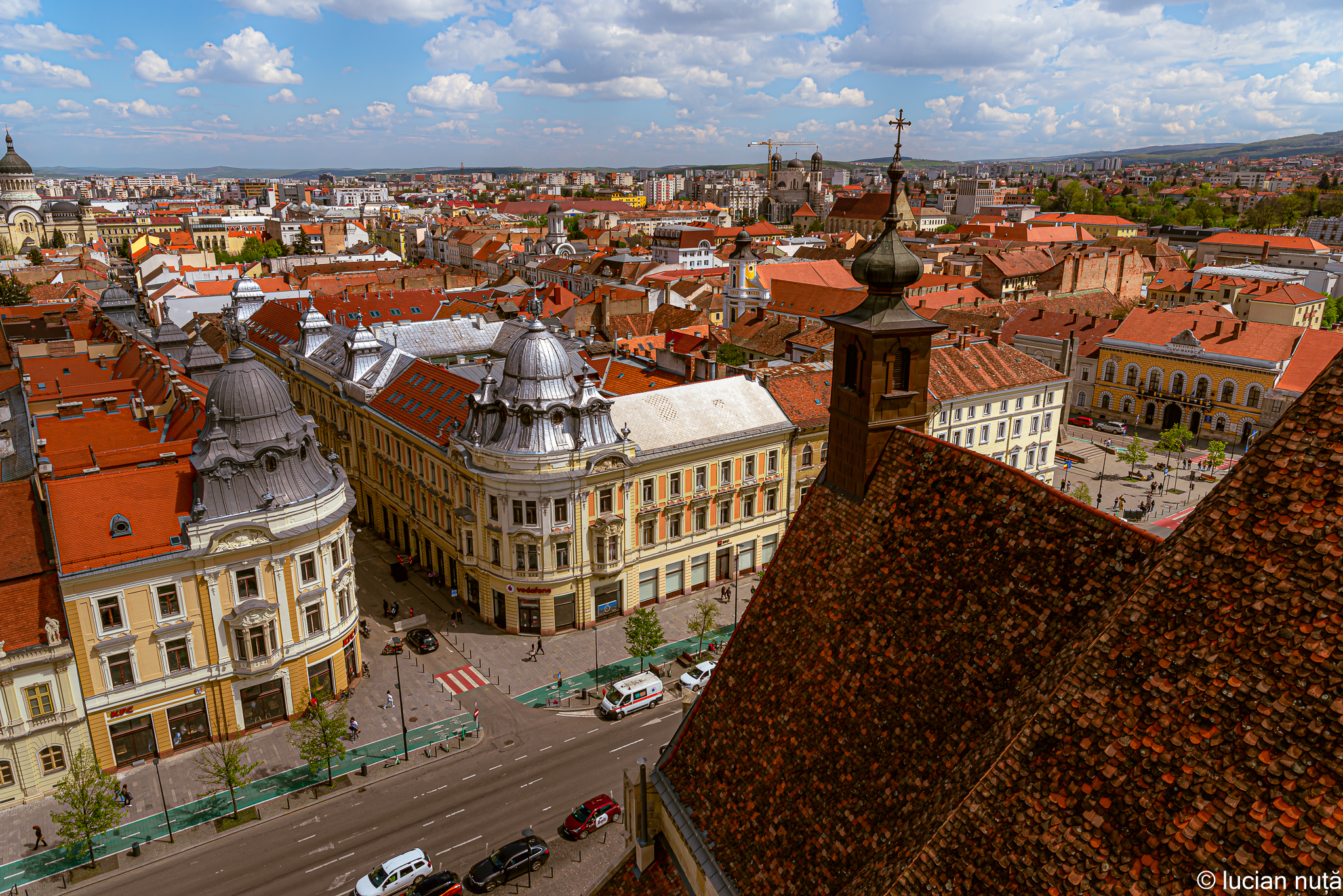
Cluj-Napoca (Hungarian: Kolozsvár, German: Klausenburg)

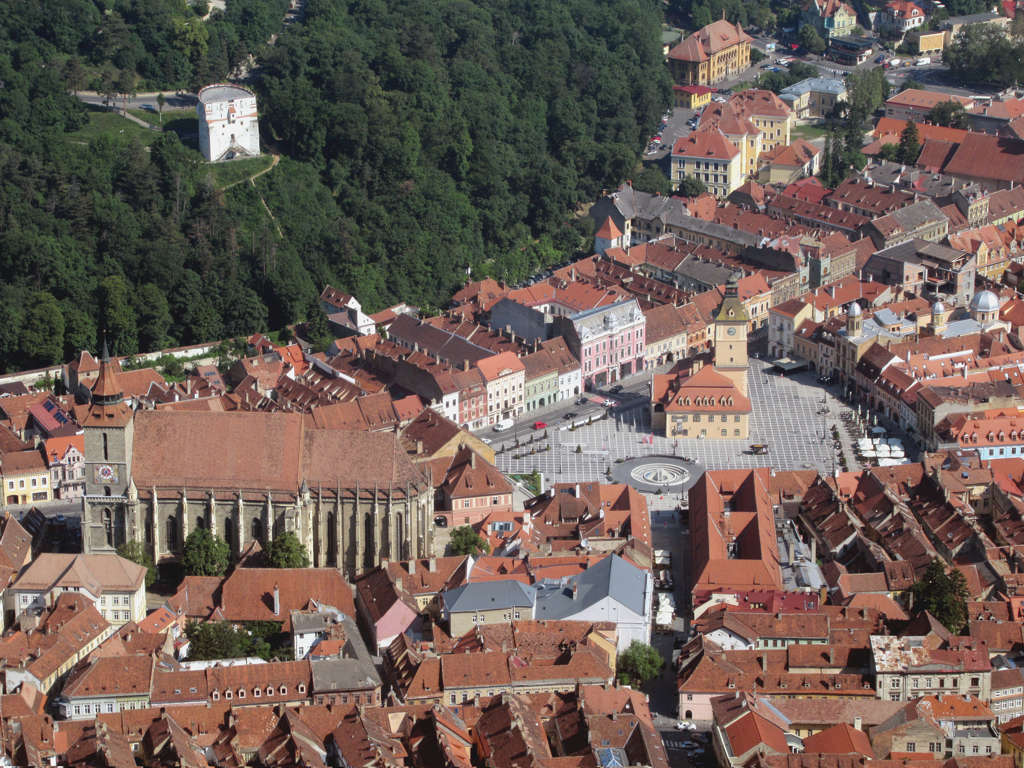
Brașov (Hungarian: Brassó, German: Kronstadt)

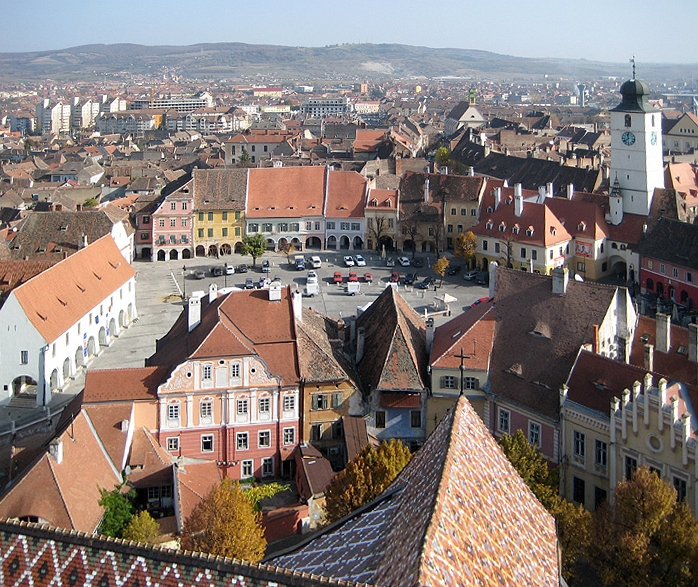
Sibiu (Hungarian: Nagyszeben, German: Hermannstadt)

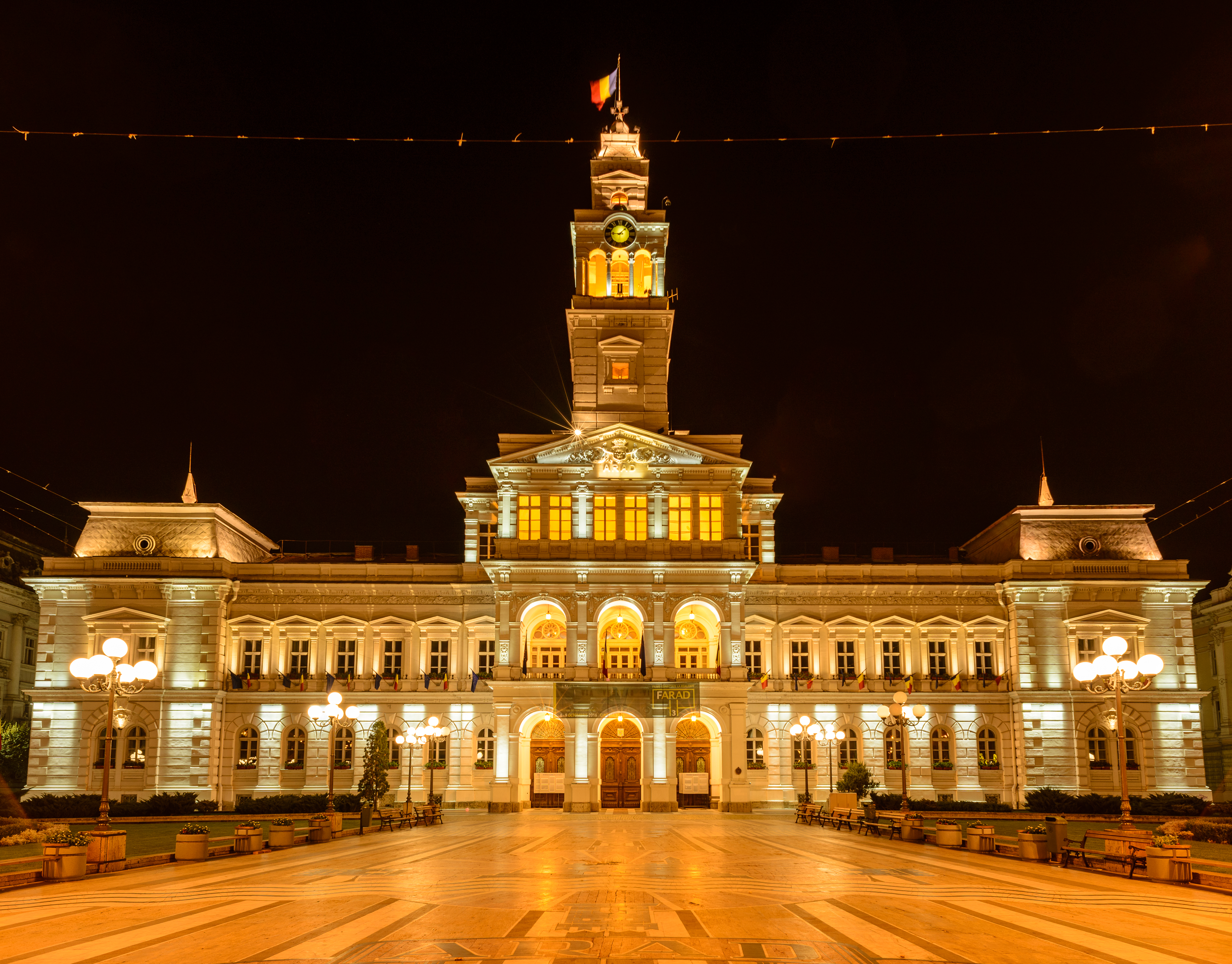
Arad (Hungarian: Arad, German: Arad)

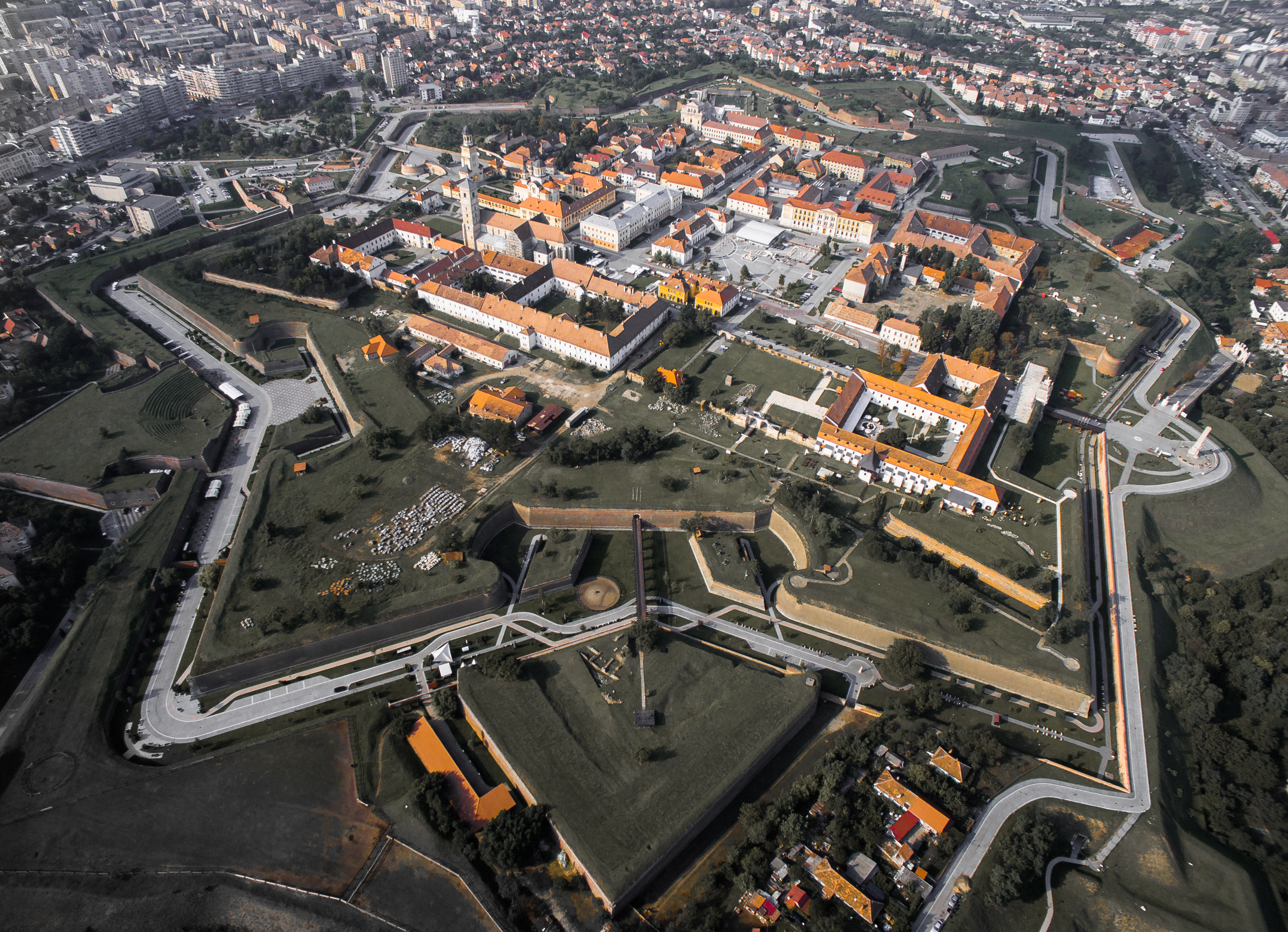
Alba Iulia (Hungarian: Gyulafehérvár, German: Karlsburg) defense wall of Alba Carolina Citadel

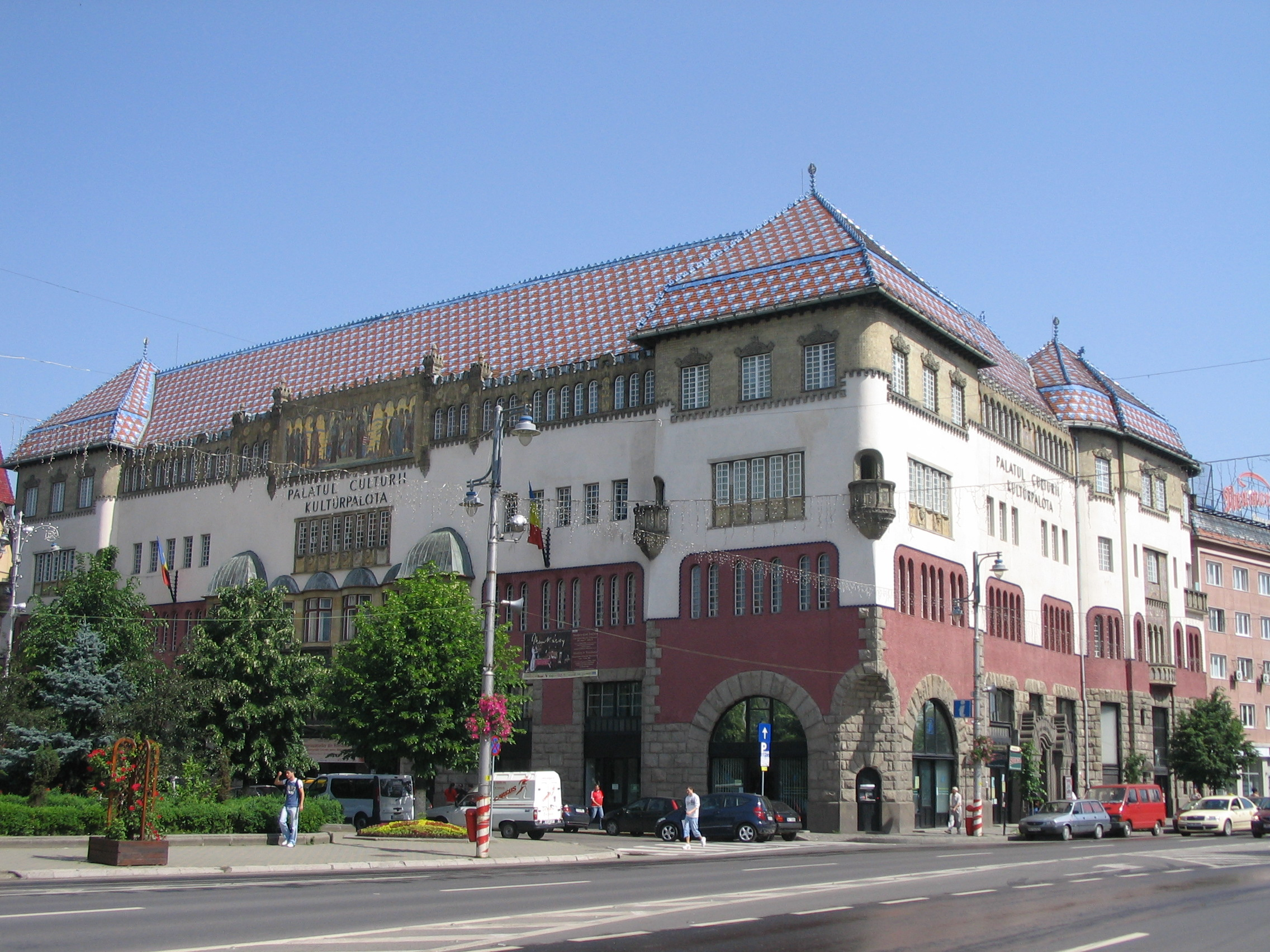
Târgu Mureș (Hungarian: Marosvásárhely, German: Neumarkt am Mieresch)

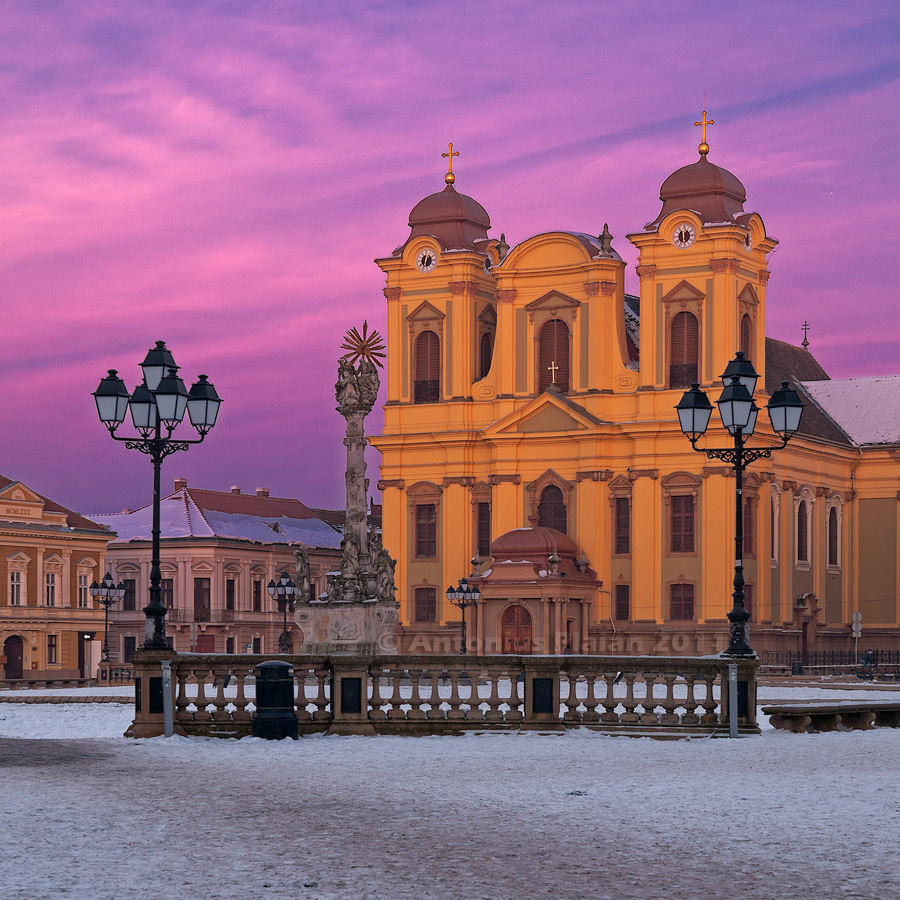
Timișoara (Hungarian: Temesvár, German: Temeschburg)

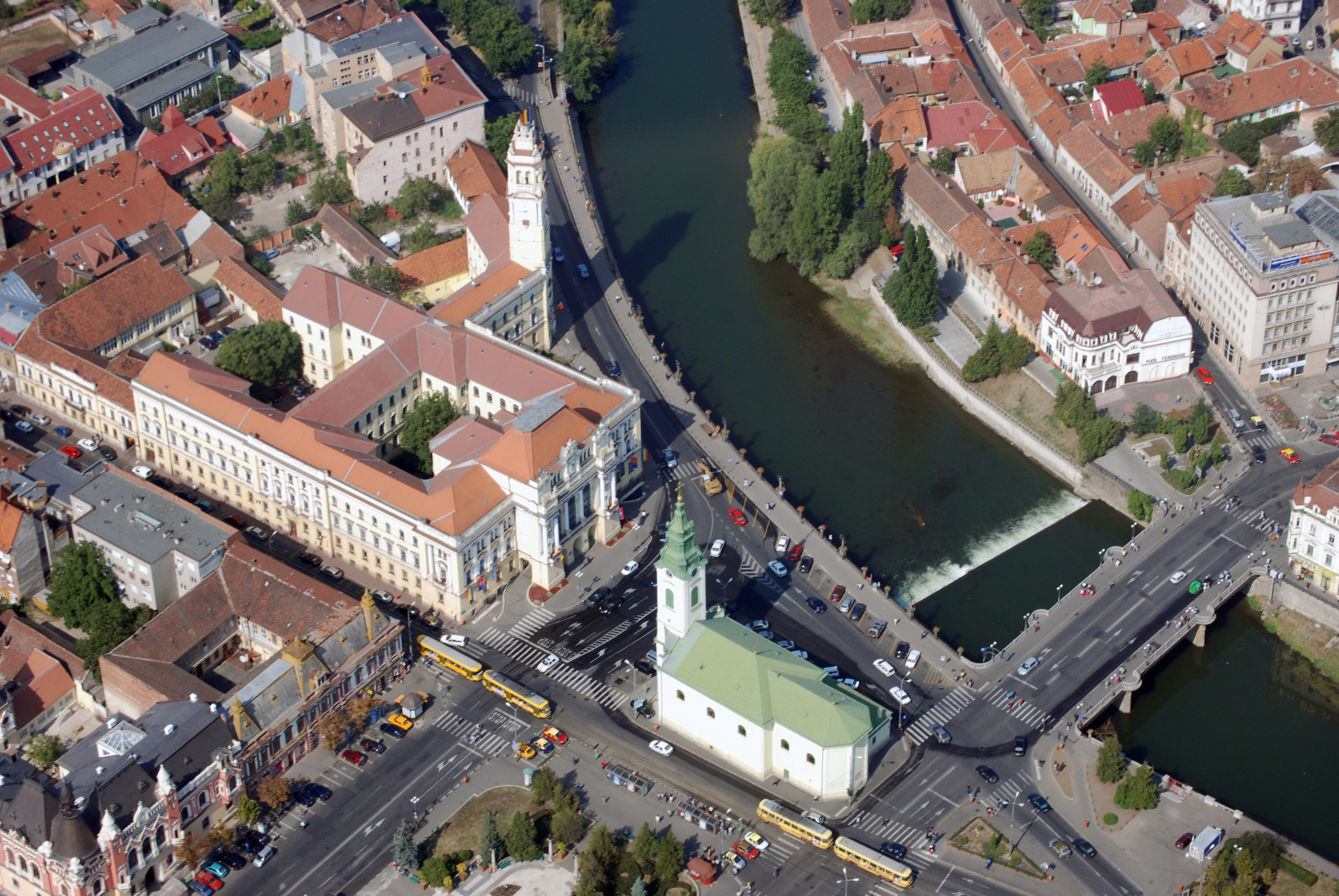
Oradea (Hungarian: Nagyvárad, German: Großwardein)

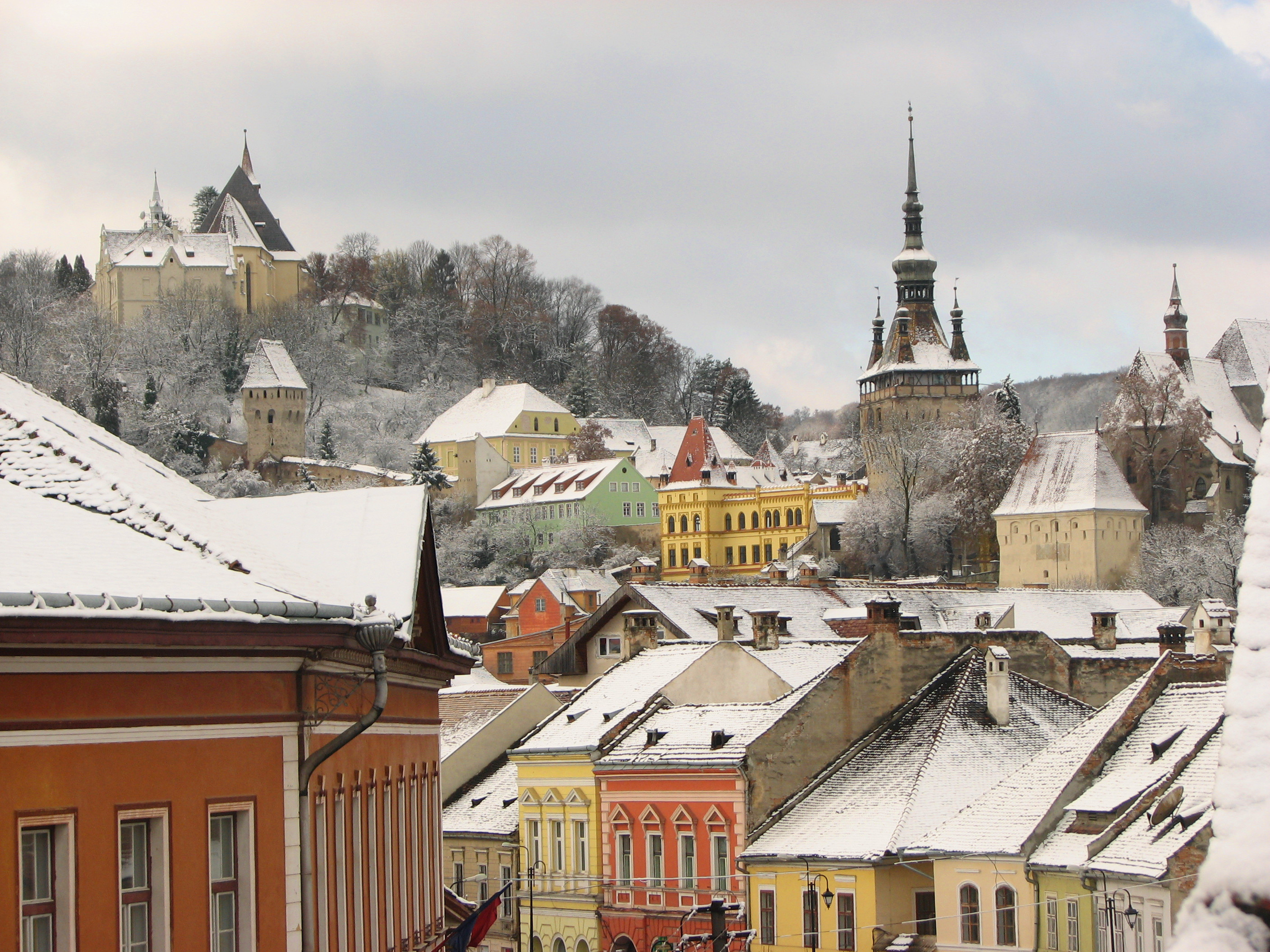
Sighișoara (Hungarian: Segesvár, German: Schäßburg)

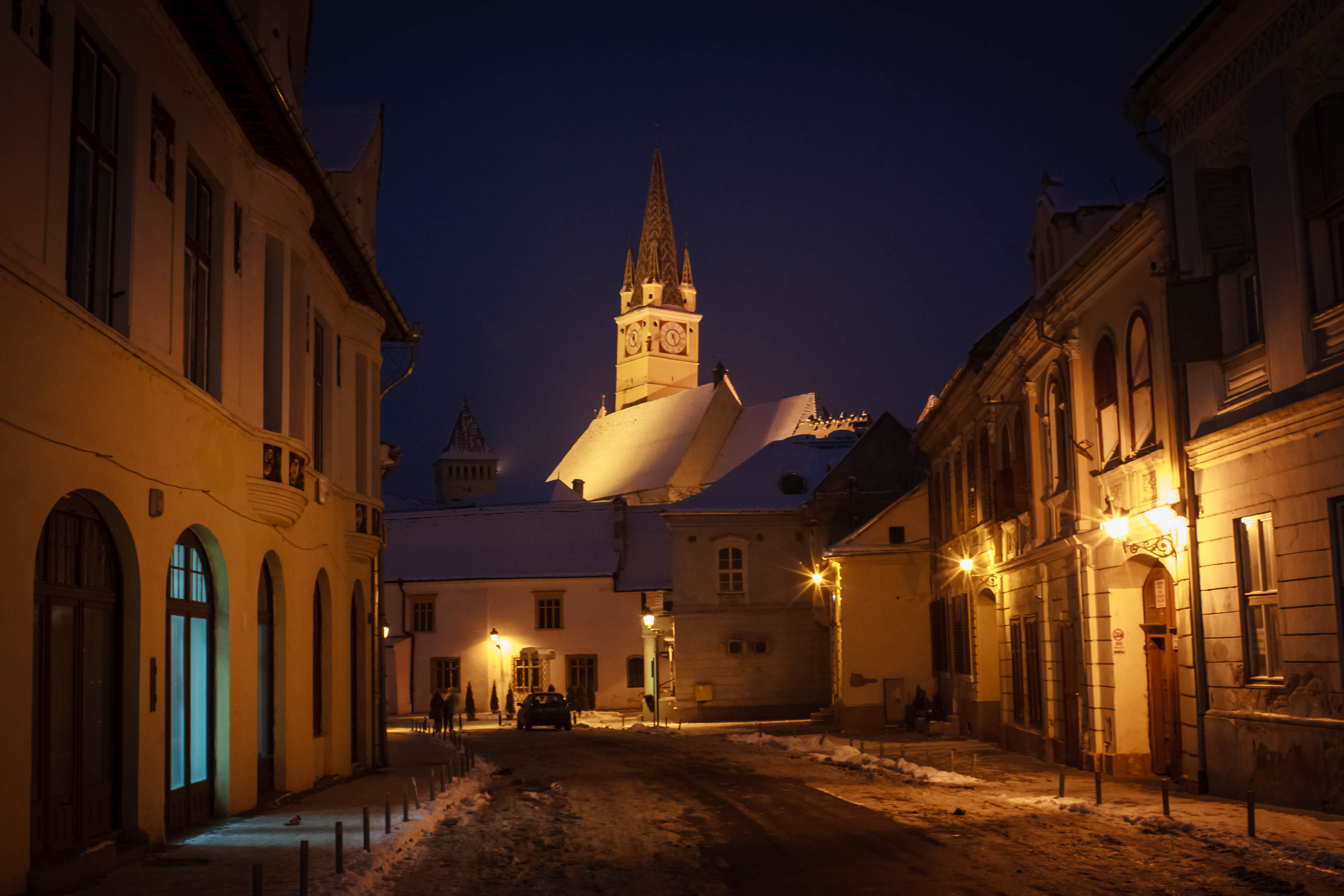
Mediaș (Hungarian: Medgyes, German: Mediasch)

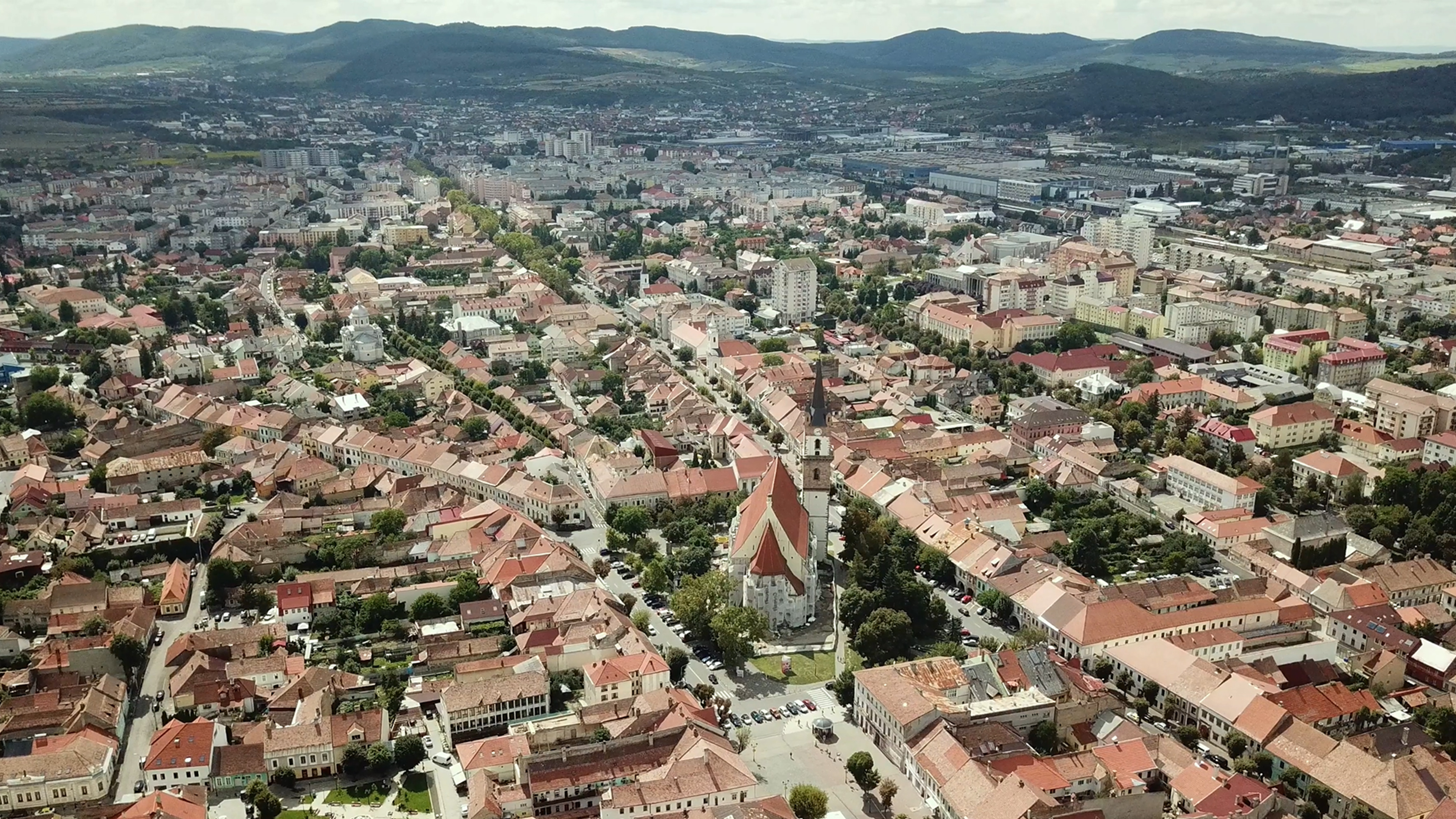
Bistrița (Hungarian: Beszterce, German: Bistritz)

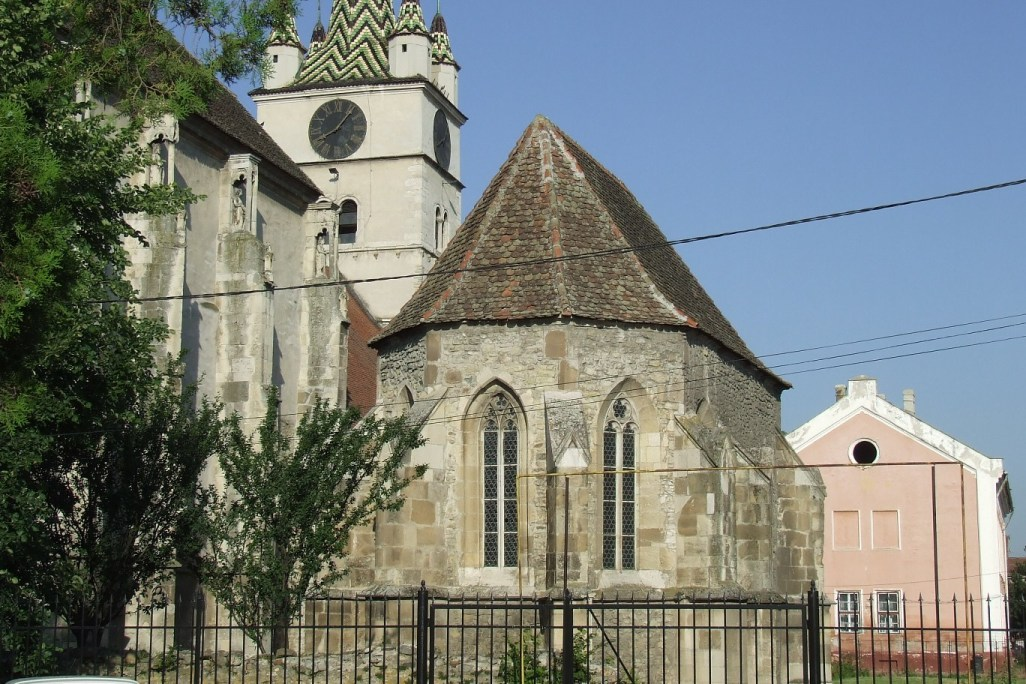
Sebeș (Hungarian: Szászsebes, German: Mülbach)

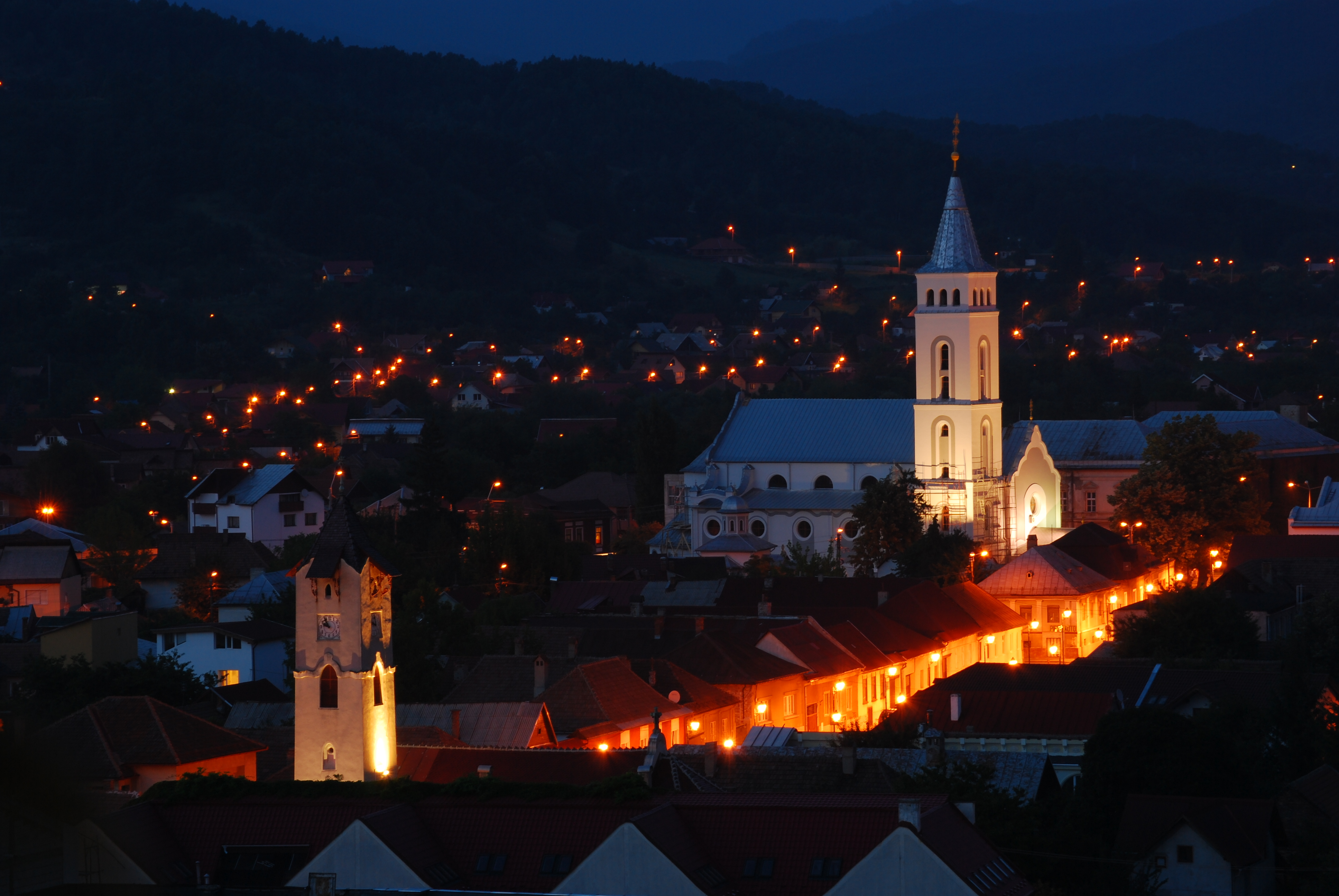
Baia Mare (Hungarian: Nagybánya, German: Frauenbach)

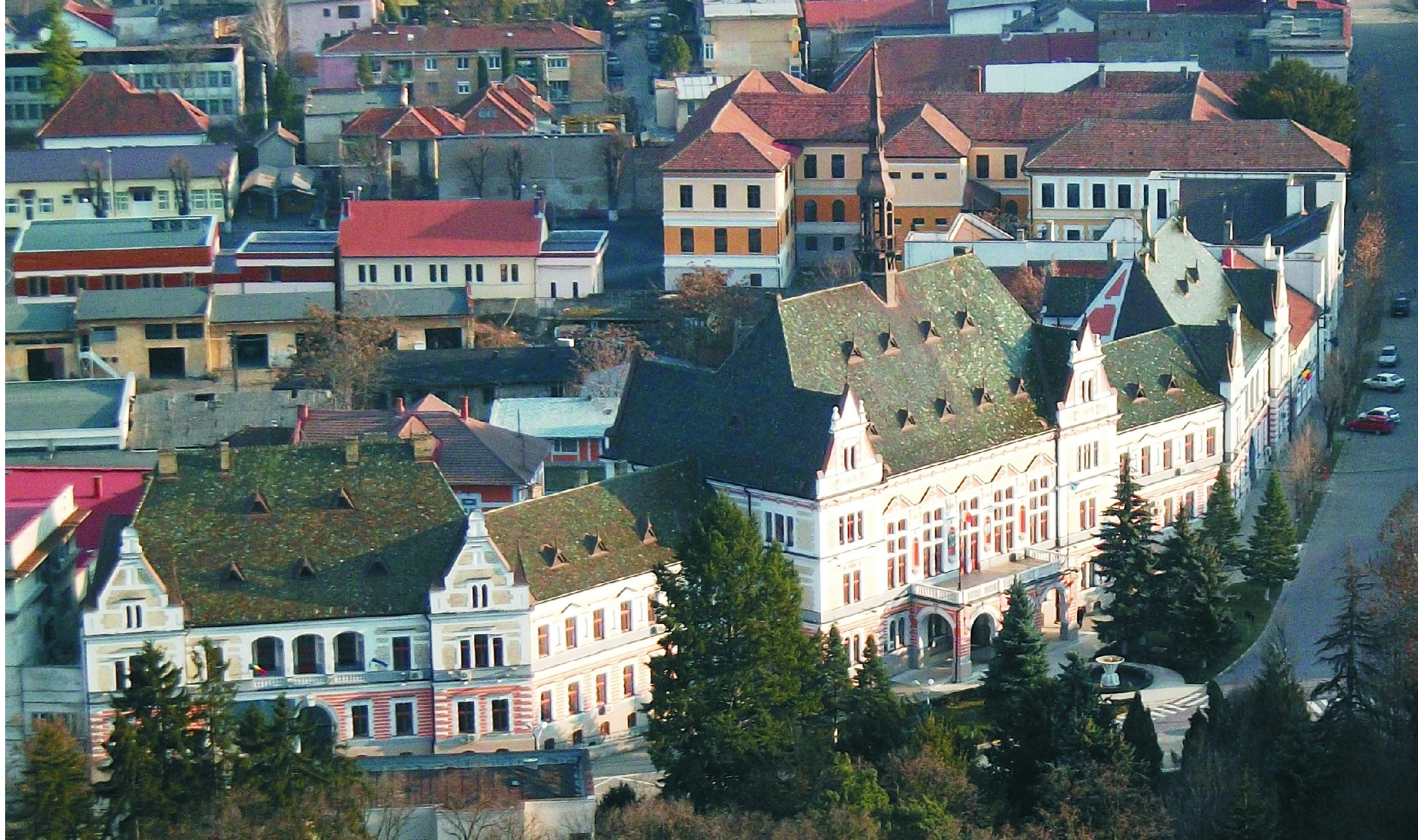
Deva (Hungarian: Déva, German: Diemrich)

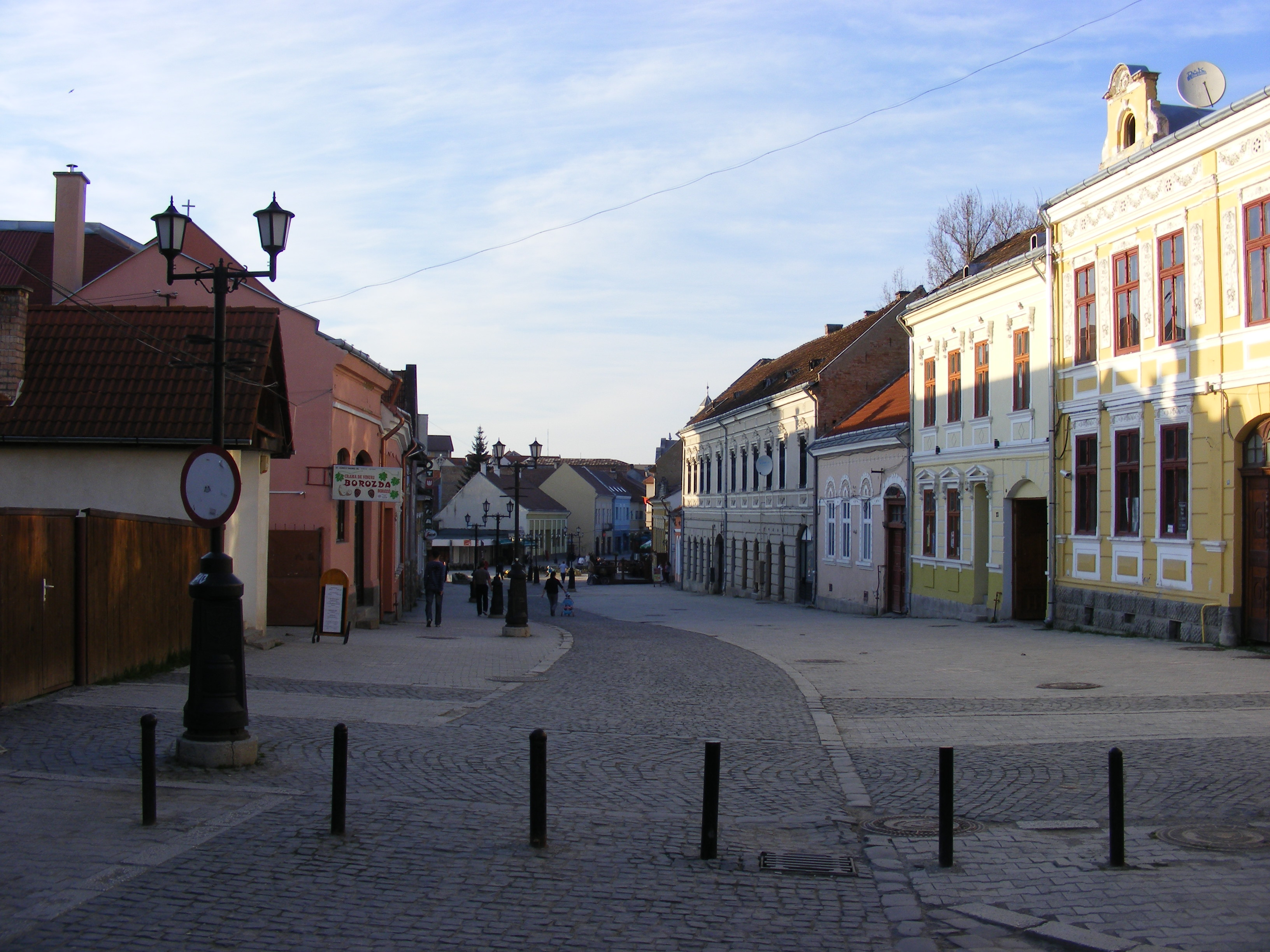
Miercurea Ciuc (Hungarian: Csíkszereda, German: Szeklerburg)

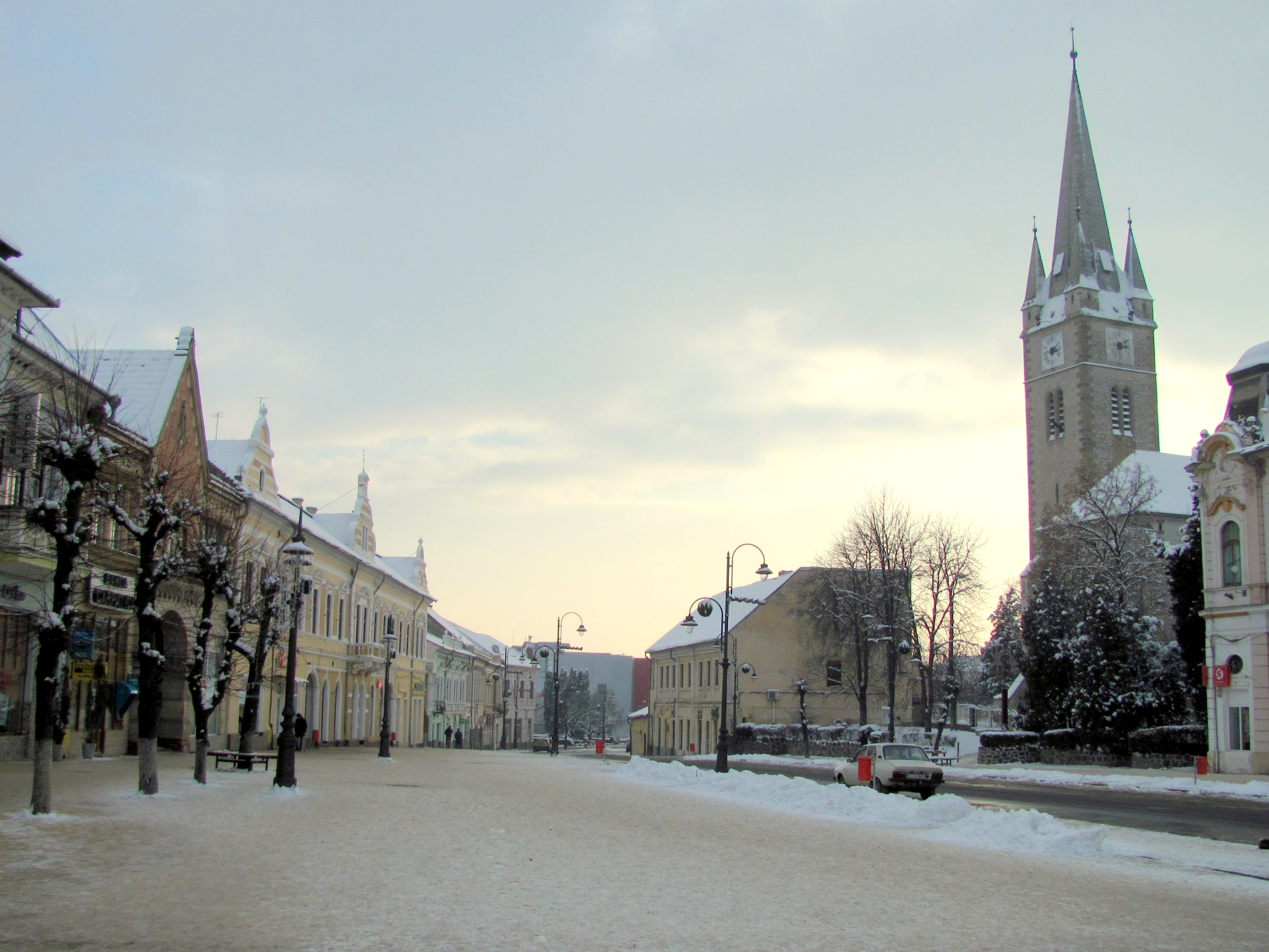
Turda (Hungarian: Torda, German: Thorenburg)

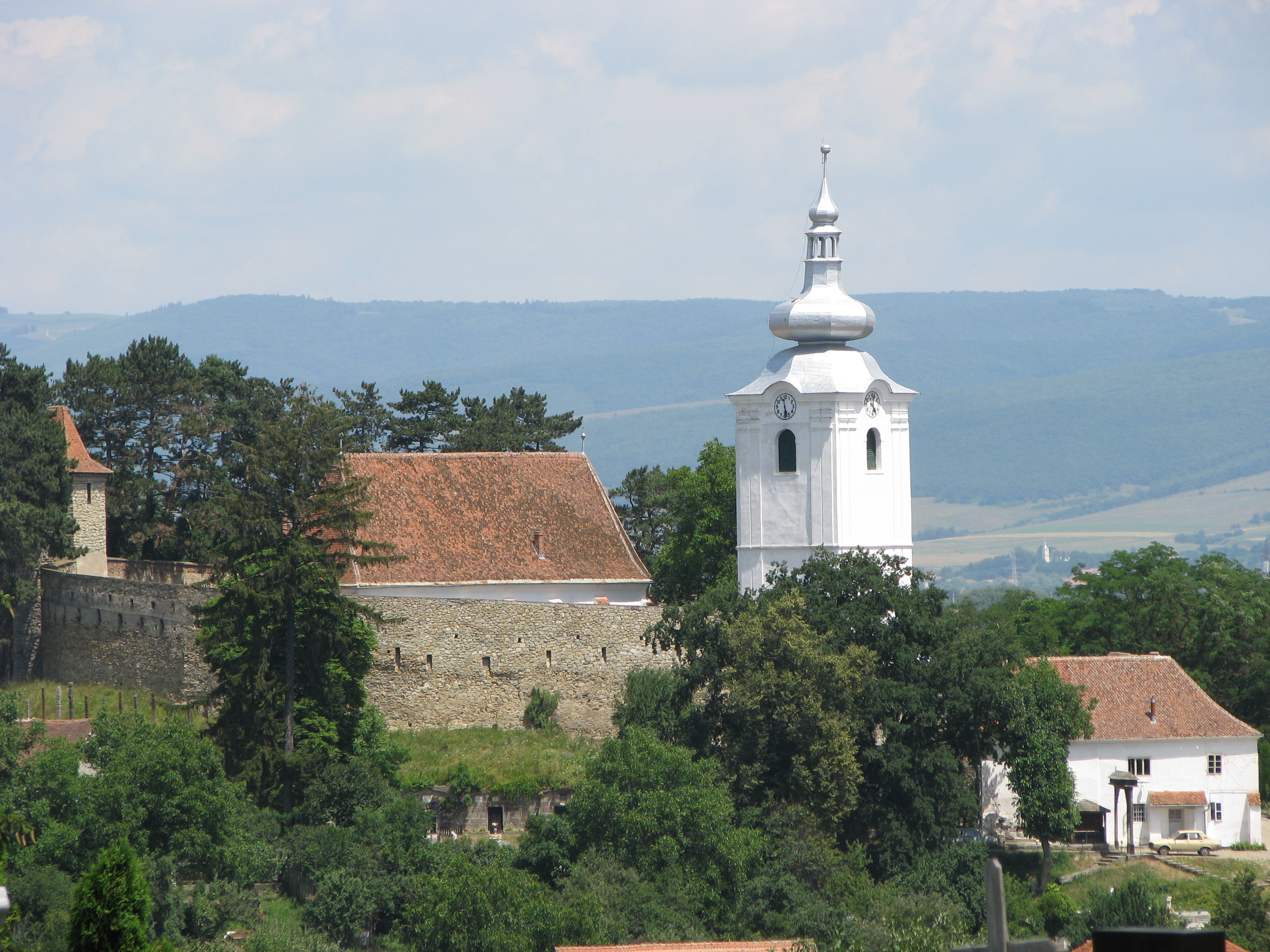
Sfântu Gheorghe (Hungarian: Sepsiszentgyörgy, German: Gergen)

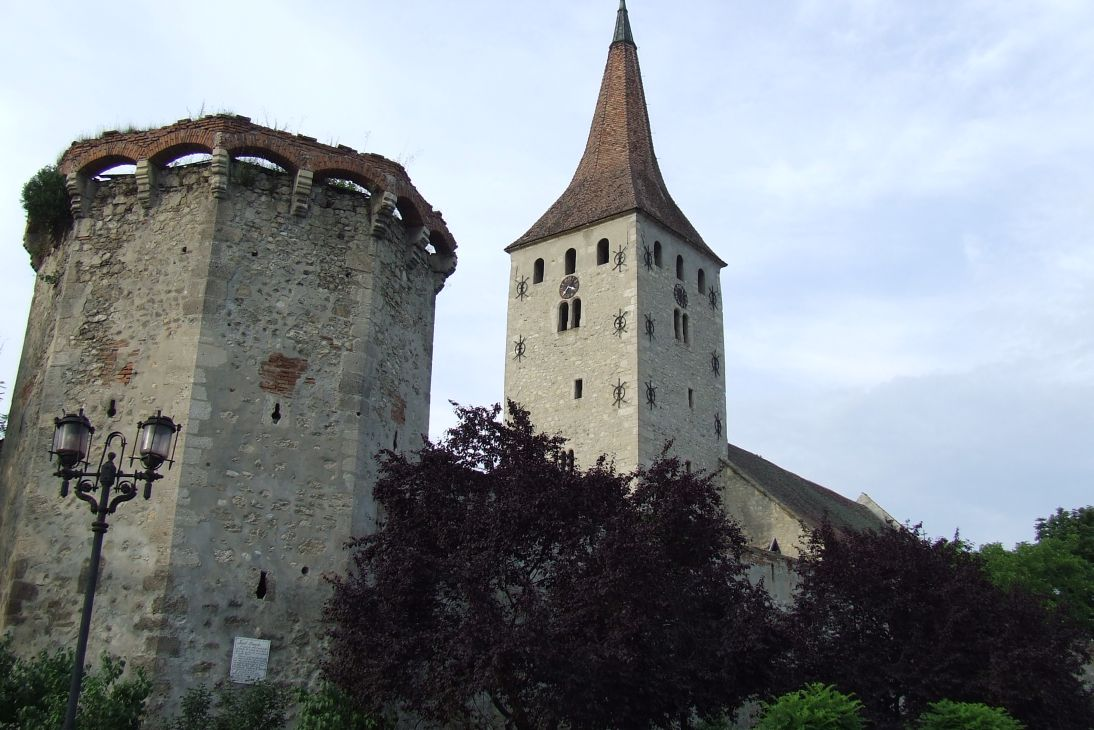
Aiud Citadel in Aiud (Hungarian: Nagyenyed, German: Straßburg am Mieresch)

== Population ==
=== Historical population ===
Ethno-linguistic map of Austria-Hungary, 1910

Official censuses with information on Transylvania's population have been conducted since the 18th century. On 1 May 1784 the Emperor Joseph II called for the first official census of the Habsburg Empire, including Transylvania. The data was published in 1787, and this census showed only the overall population (1,440,986 inhabitants). Fényes Elek, a 19th-century Hungarian statistician, estimated in 1842 that in the population of Transylvania for the years 1830–1840 the majority were 62.3% Romanians and 23.3% Hungarians.

In the last quarter of the 19th century, the Hungarian population of Transylvania increased from 24.9% in 1869 to 31.6%, as indicated in the 1910 Hungarian census (the majority of the Jewish population reported Hungarian as their primary language, so they were also counted as ethnically Hungarian in the 1910 census). At the same time, the percentage of the Romanian population decreased from 59.0% to 53.8% and the percentage of the German population decreased from 11.9% to 10.7%, for a total population of 5,262,495. Magyarization policies greatly contributed to this shift.

The percentage of the Romanian majority has significantly increased since the declaration of the union of Transylvania with Romania after World War I in 1918. The proportion of Hungarians in Transylvania was in steep decline as more of the region's inhabitants moved into urban areas, where the pressure to assimilate and Romanianize was greater. The expropriation of the estates of Magyar magnates, the distribution of the lands to the Romanian peasants, and the policy of cultural Romanianization that followed the Treaty of Trianon were major causes of friction between Hungary and Romania. Other factors include the emigration of non-Romanian peoples, assimilation and internal migration within Romania (estimates show that between 1945 and 1977, some 630,000 people moved from the Old Kingdom to Transylvania, and 280,000 from Transylvania to the Old Kingdom, most notably to Bucharest).

=== Current population ===
According to the results of the 2011 census, the total population of Transylvania was 6,789,250 inhabitants and the ethnic groups were: Romanians – 70.62%, Hungarians – 17.92%, Roma – 3.99%, Ukrainians – 0.63%, Germans (mostly Transylvanian Saxons and Banat Swabians, but also Zipsers, Sathmar Swabians, or Landlers) – 0.49%, other – 0.77%. Some 378,298 inhabitants (5.58%) have not declared their ethnicity. The ethnic Hungarian population of Transylvania form a majority in the counties of Covasna (73.7%) and Harghita (85.7%). The Hungarians are also numerous in the following counties: Mureș (38.1%), Satu Mare (34.6%), Bihor (25.2%), and Sălaj (23.2%).

== Economy ==
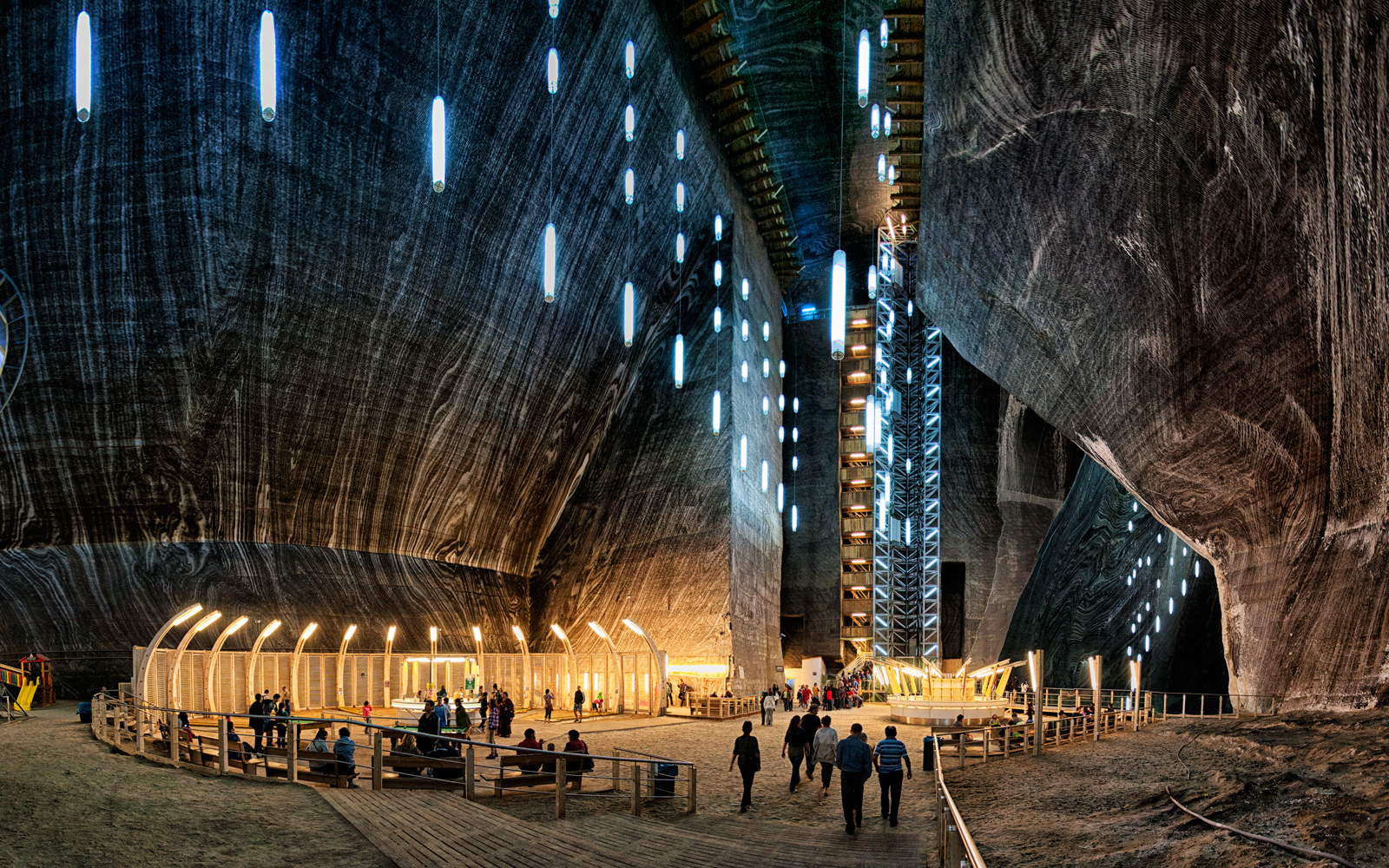
The former salt mine of Salina Turda, now repurposed as a tourist attraction

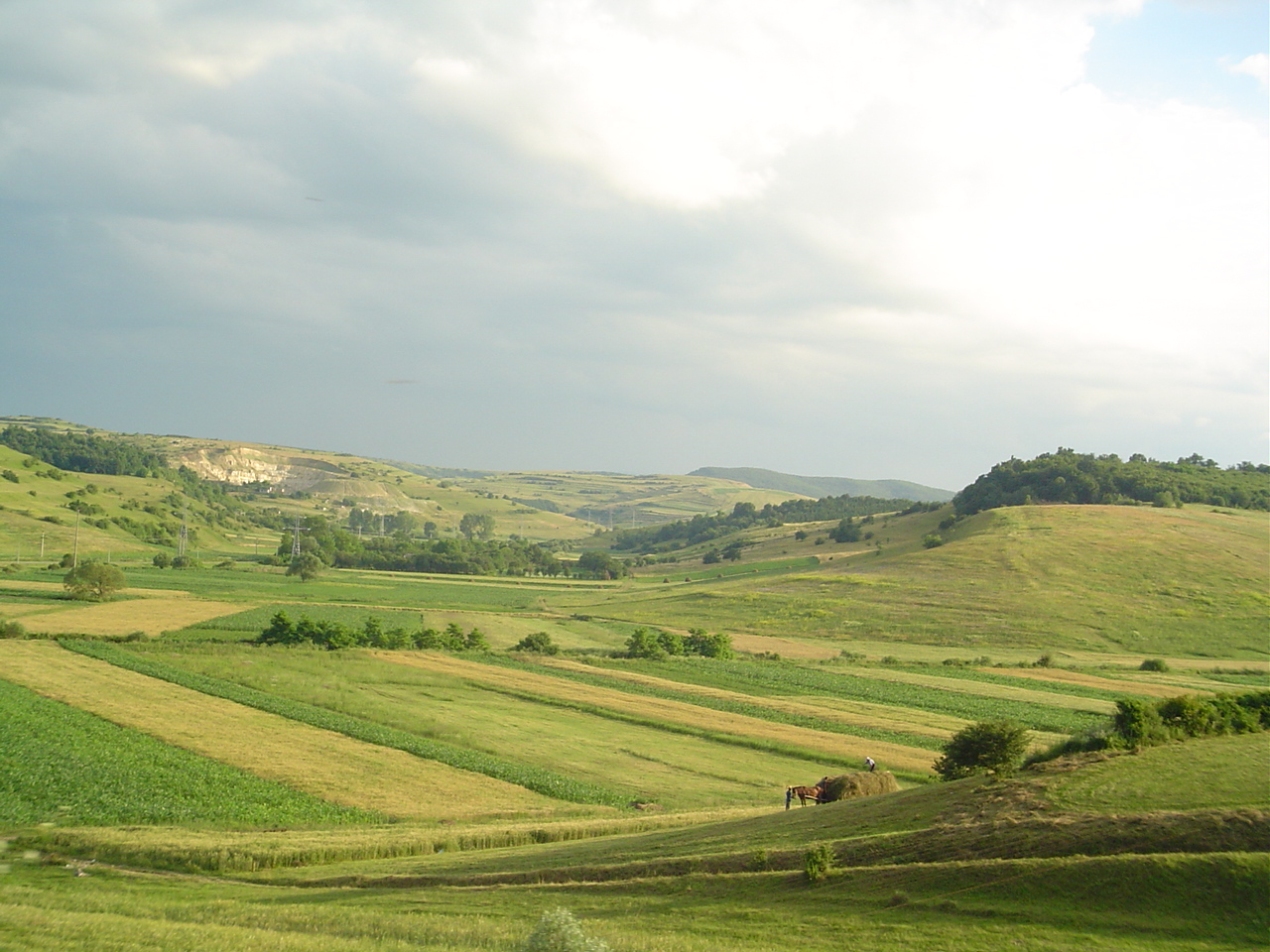
Rural landscape in Transylvania, including meadows and small hilly forests

Transylvania is rich in mineral resources, notably lignite, iron, lead, manganese, gold, copper, natural gas, salt, and sulfur.

Transylvania's GDP (nominal) is about $134 billion in 2025 according to CNP.ro data and its GDP per capita measures about $20,602 in the same time period. Transylvania's Human Development Index is ranked 0.829, which makes Transylvania the 2nd most developed region in Romania after Bucharest-Ilfov.

There are large iron and steel, chemical, and textile industries. Stock raising, agriculture, wine production and fruit growing are important occupations. Agriculture is widespread in the Transylvanian Plateau, including growing cereals, vegetables, viticulture and breeding cattle, sheep, swine, and poultry. Timber is another valuable resource.

IT, electronics and automotive industries are important in urban and university centres like Cluj-Napoca (Robert Bosch GmbH, Emerson Electric), Timișoara (Alcatel-Lucent, Flextronics and Continental AG), Brașov, Sibiu, Oradea and Arad. The cities of Cluj Napoca and Târgu Mureș are connected with a strong medical tradition, and according to the same classifications top performance hospitals exist there.

Native brands include: Roman of Brașov (trucks and buses), Azomureș of Târgu Mureș (fertilizers), Terapia of Cluj-Napoca (pharmaceuticals), Banca Transilvania of Cluj-Napoca (finance), Romgaz and Transgaz of Mediaș (natural gas), Jidvei of Alba county (alcoholic beverages), Timișoreana of Timișoara (alcoholic beverages), the state owned Cugir Arms Factory, and others.

The Jiu Valley, located in the south of Hunedoara County, has been a major mining area throughout the second half of the 19th century and the 20th century, but many mines were closed down in the years following the collapse of the communist regime, forcing the region to diversify its economy.

During the Second World War, Transylvania (the Southern/Romanian half, as the region was divided during the war) was crucial to the Romanian defense industry. Transylvanian factories built until 1945 over 1,000 warplanes and over 1,000 artillery pieces of all types, among others.

== Culture ==
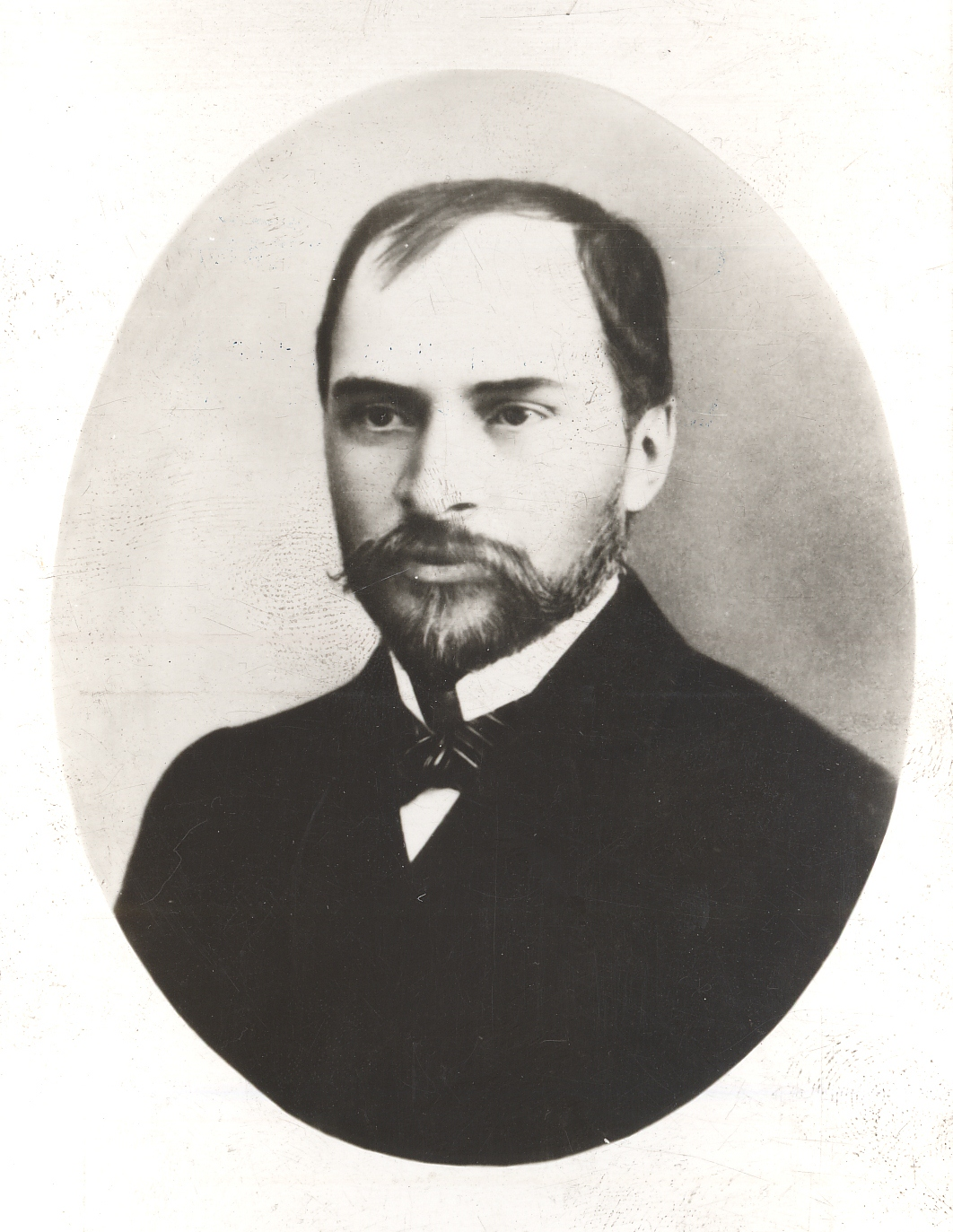
George Coșbuc, Romanian poet, translator, teacher, and journalist, best known for his verses describing, praising and eulogizing rural life

The culture of Transylvania is complex because of its varied history and longstanding multiculturalism, which has incorporated significant Hungarian (see Hungarians in Romania) and German (see Germans of Romania) influences.

The region was the birthplace of the Transylvanian School movement, its members, namely Samuil Micu-Klein, Petru Maior, and Gheorghe Șincai, being responsible for the early version of Romanian alphabet.

With regard to architecture, the Transylvanian Gothic style is preserved to this day in monuments such as the Black Church in Brașov (14th and 15th centuries) and a number of other cathedrals, as well as the Bran Castle in Brașov County (14th century), and the Hunyad Castle in Hunedoara (15th century).

Notable writers such as Elek Benedek, George Coșbuc, Octavian Goga, Liviu Rebreanu, Lucian Blaga, Áron Tamási, Emil Cioran, András Sütő, Sándor Kányádi were born in Transylvania. Liviu Rebreanu wrote the novel Ion, which introduces the reader to a depiction of the life of Romanian peasants and intellectuals of Transylvania at the turn of the 20th century. Károly Kós was one of the most important writers supporting the movement of Transylvanianism.

== Religion ==
Transylvania has a very rich and unique religious history. Since the Protestant Reformation, different Christian denominations have coexisted here, including Romanian Orthodox, other Eastern Orthodox, Latin Catholic and Romanian Greek Catholic, Lutheran, Reformed, and Unitarian branches. Christianity is the largest religion, but other faiths also are present, including Jews and Muslims. Under the Habsburgs, Transylvania served as a place for "religious undesirables". People who arrived in Transylvania included those that did not conform to the Catholic Church and were sent here forcibly, as well as many religious refugees. Transylvania has a long history of religious tolerance, ensured by its religious pluralism.

Transylvania has also been (and still is) a centre for Christian denominations other than Eastern Orthodoxy, the form of Christianity that most Romanians currently follow. As such, there are significant numbers of inhabitants of Transylvania that follow Latin Catholicism and Greek Catholicism, and Protestantism. Even though before 1948, the population of Transylvania split between Eastern Orthodox, Greek Catholic and other forms of Christianity, during the Communist Period the Orthodox Church was much more favoured by the state which has led to Eastern Orthodoxy being the religion of the majority of Transylvanians. However, among the Hungarian and German minorities only a small part are Eastern Orthodox. The main two religions of the Hungarian minority are Reformed (Calvinism) and Roman Catholicism; among Germans the main religions are Roman Catholicism (slightly over half of Germans in Romania), followed by Lutheranism and Eastern Orthodox. There are also Pentecostals and Baptists, particularly in Banat and Crișana. Babeș-Bolyai University, located in Cluj-Napoca is the only university in Europe that has four faculties of theology (Orthodox, Reformed, Roman Catholic, and Greek Catholic).

	1930		2011	
Denomination	Number	%	Number	%
Eastern Orthodoxy	1,933,589	34.85	4,478,532	65.96
Greek Catholicism	1,385,017	24.96	142,862	2.10
Latin Catholicism	946,100	17.05	632,948	9.32
Mainline Protestantism	1,038,464	18.72	675,107	9.34
Evangelical Protestantism	37,061	0.66	339,472	4.70

There are also small denominations like Adventism, Jehovah's Witnesses and more.

=== Other religions ===
- Nowadays, there is a very small number of Muslims (Islam) and Jews (Judaism), but back in 1930, with 191,877 inhabitants, Jews represented 3.46% of Transylvania's population.
- Atheists, agnostics and unaffiliated account for 0.27% of Transylvania's population.

Data refers to extended Transylvania (with Banat, Crișana and Maramureș).

== Tourist attractions ==
Drone footage of the Fortress of Deva (Hungarian: Déva vára, German: Diemricher Burg)

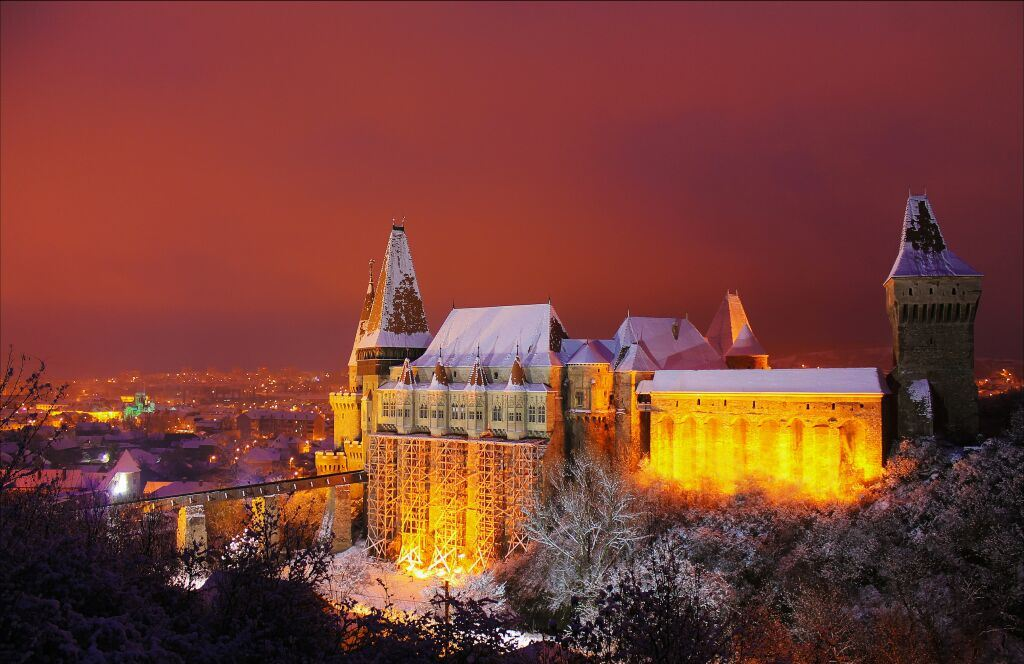
Corvin Castle, Hunedoara (Hungarian: Vajdahunyad, German: Eisenmarkt)

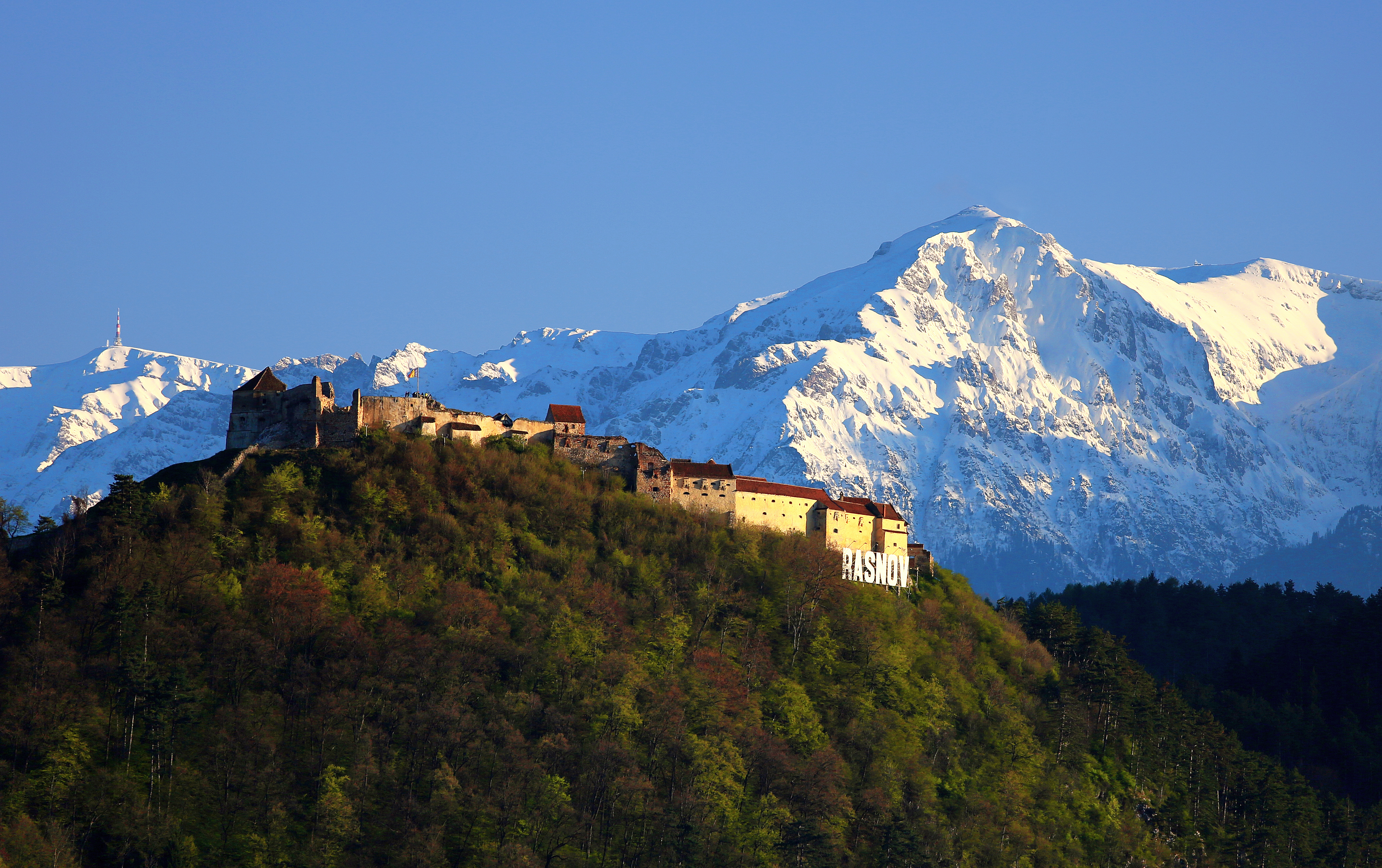
Râșnov Fortress, Râșnov (Hungarian: Barcarozsnyó, German: Rosenau)

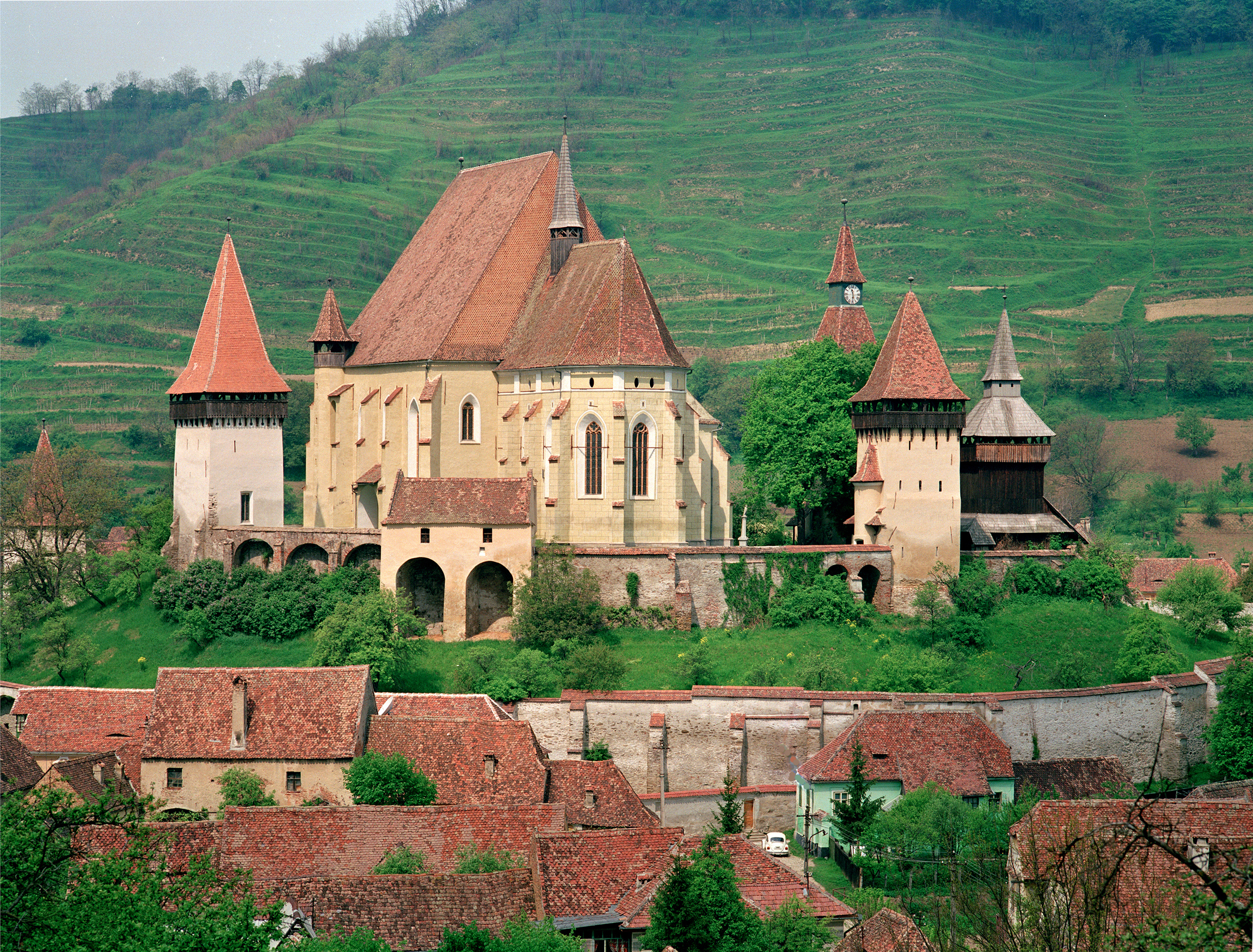
Biertan fortified church, Biertan (Hungarian: Berethalom, German: Birthälm)

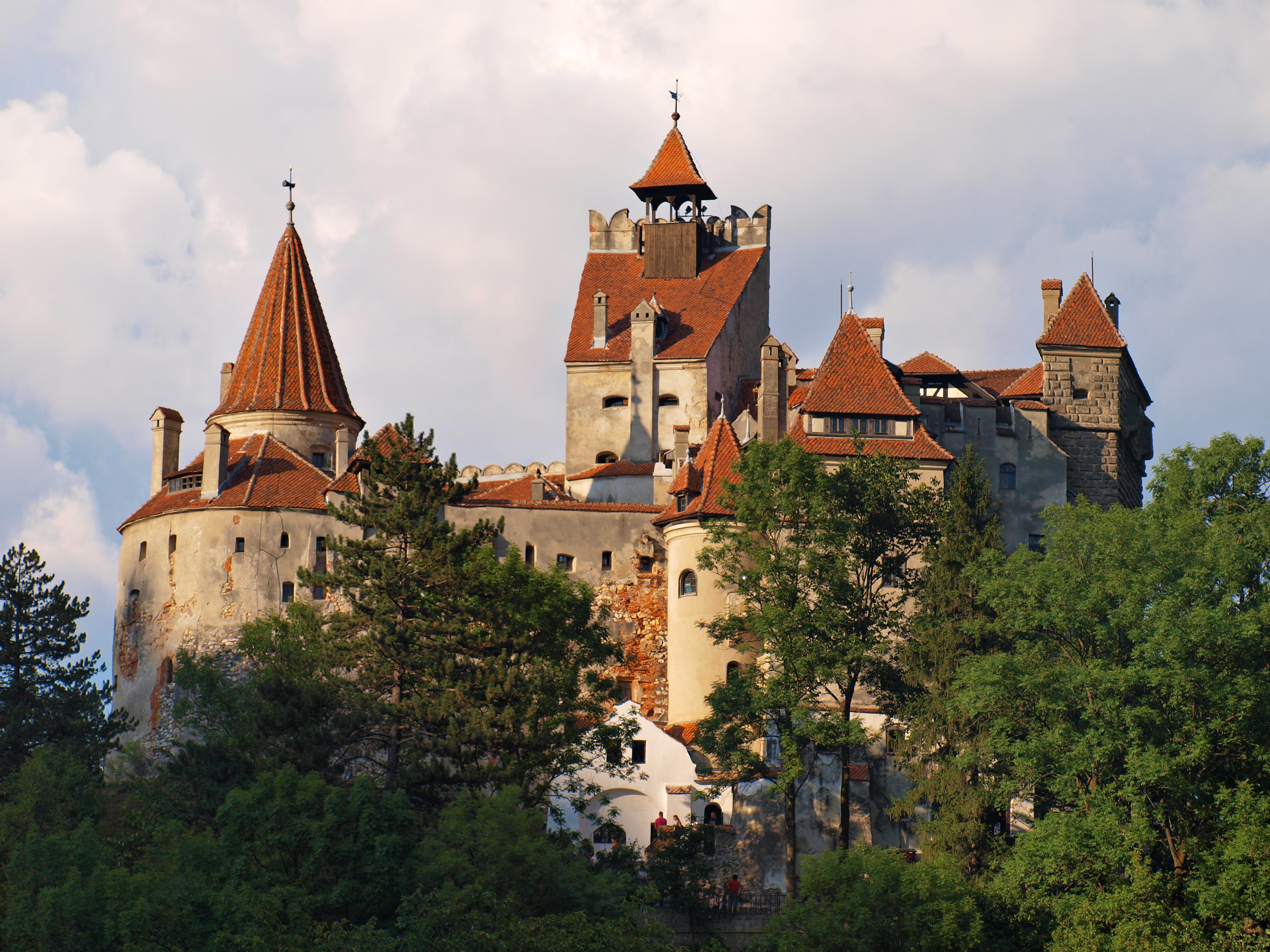
Bran Castle, Bran (Hungarian: Törcsvár, German: Die Törzburg)

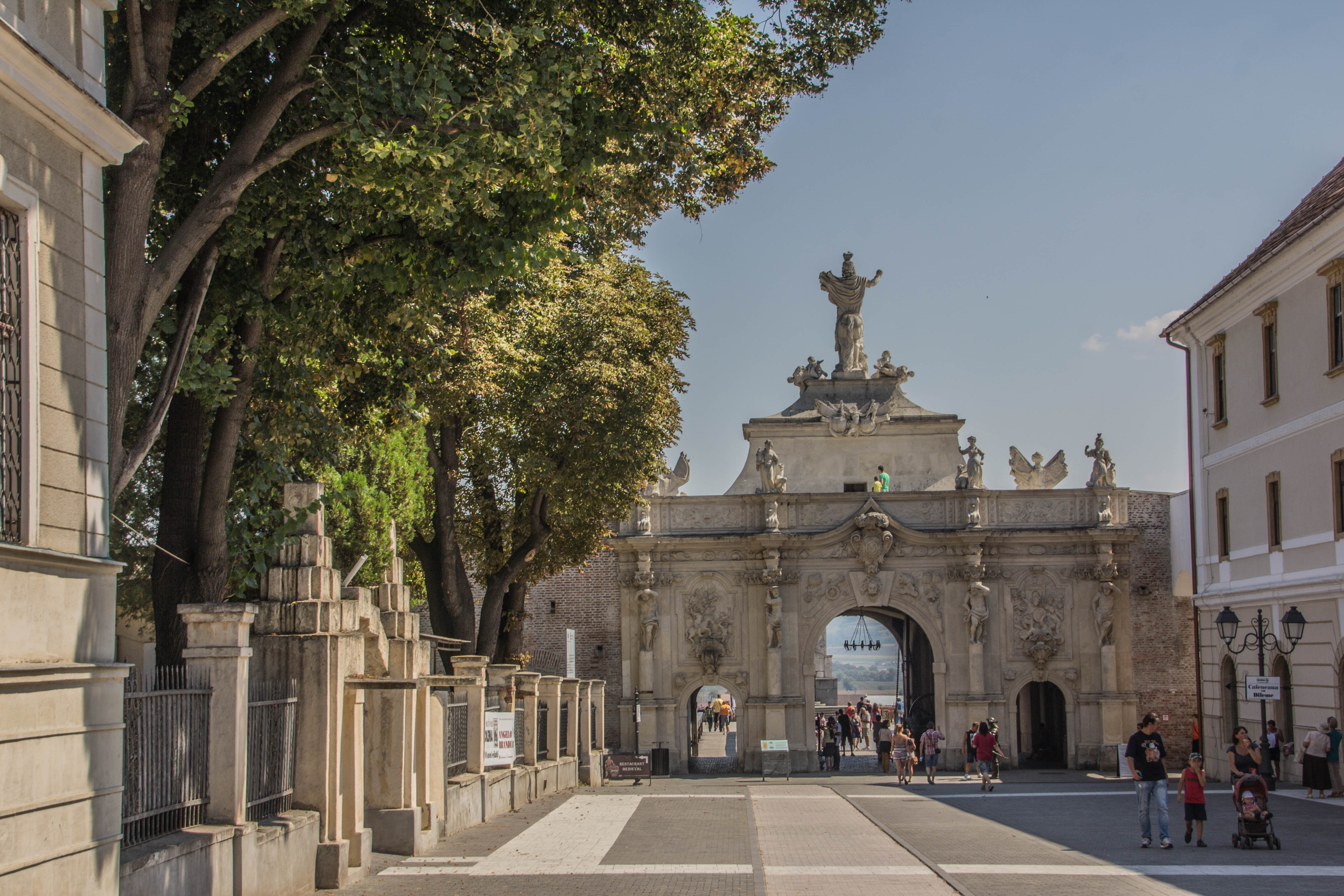
Gate to Alba Carolina Citadel

- Bran Castle, also known as Dracula's Castle
- Fortress of Deva
- The very well preserved medieval towns of Alba Iulia, Cluj-Napoca (European Youth Capital 2015), Sibiu (European Capital of Culture in 2007), Târgu Mureș, and Sighișoara (UNESCO World Heritage Site and alleged birthplace of Vlad Dracula)
- The city of Brașov and the nearby Poiana Brașov ski resort
- The town of Hunedoara with the 14th century Corvin Castle
- The citadel and the Art Nouveau city centre of Oradea
- The Densuș Church, the oldest church in Romania that still holds services
- The Dacian Fortresses of the Orăștie Mountains, including Sarmizegetusa Regia (UNESCO World Heritage Site)
- The Roman forts including Sarmizegetusa Ulpia Traiana, Porolissum, Apulum, Potaissa, and Drobeta
- The Red Lake (also known as Lake Ghilcoș)
- The Turda Gorge natural reserve
- The Râșnov Citadel in Râșnov
- The Maramureș region
  - The Merry Cemetery of Săpânța (the only one of that kind in the world)
  - The Wooden Churches (UNESCO World Heritage Site)
  - The cities of Baia Mare and Sighetu Marmației
  - The villages in the Iza, Mara, and Vișeu valleys
- The Saxon fortified churches (UNESCO World Heritage Site)
- The Apuseni Mountains:
  - Țara Moților
  - The Bears' Cave
  - Scărișoara Cave in Alba County, the third largest glacier cave in the world
- The Rodna Mountains
- The Salina Turda Salt Mine: according to Business Insider, it is one of the ten "coolest underground places in the world".
- The Via Transilvanica hiking and biking trail

=== Festivals and events ===
==== Film festivals ====
- Transilvania International Film Festival, Cluj-Napoca – Romania's biggest film festival
- Gay Film Nights, Cluj-Napoca
- Comedy Cluj, Cluj-Napoca
- Humor Film Festival, Timișoara

==== Music festivals ====
- Golden Stag Festival, Brașov
- Gărâna Jazz Festival, Gărâna
- Peninsula / Félsziget Festival, Târgu-Mureș
- Untold Festival, Cluj-Napoca – Romania's biggest music festival
- Toamna Muzicală Clujeană, Cluj-Napoca
- Artmania Festival, Sibiu
- Rockstadt Extreme Fest, Râșnov
- Electric Castle Festival, Bontida, Cluj-Napoca

==== Others ====
- Sighișoara Medieval Festival, Sighișoara
- Sibiu International Theatre Festival
- Festivalul Medieval Cetăți Transilvane Sibiu

== Historical coat of arms of Transylvania ==
The first heraldic representations of Transylvania date from the 16th century. The Diet of 1659 codified the representation of the privileged nations (Unio Trium Nationum (Union of the Three Nations)) in Transylvania's coat of arms. It depicted a black eagle (Turul) on a blue background, representing the Hungarians, the Sun and the Moon representing the Székelys, and seven red towers on a yellow background representing the seven fortified cities of the Transylvanian Saxons. The flag and coat of arms of Transylvania were granted by Queen Maria Theresa in 1765, when she established a Grand Principality within the Habsburg monarchy.

In 1596, Levinus Hulsius created a coat of arms for Transylvania, consisting of a shield with a rising eagle in the upper field and seven hills with towers on top in the lower field. He published it in his work Chronologia, issued in Nuremberg the same year. The seal from 1597 of Sigismund Báthory, Prince of Transylvania, reproduced the new coat of arms with some slight changes: in the upper field the eagle was flanked by a sun and a moon and in the lower field the hills were replaced by simple towers. The coat of arms of Sigismund Báthory beside the coat of arms of the Báthory family, included the Transylvanian, Wallachia and Moldavian coat of arms, he used the title Prince of Transylvania, Wallachia and Moldavia. A short-lived heraldic representation of Transylvania is found on the seal of Michael the Brave. Besides the Wallachian eagle and the Moldavian aurochs, Transylvania is represented by two lions holding a sword standing on seven hills. Hungarian Transylvanian princes used the symbols of the Transylvanian coat of arms usually with the Hungarian coat of arms since the 16th century because Transylvanian princes maintained their claims to the throne of the Kingdom of Hungary.

While neither symbol has official status in present-day Romania, the Transylvanian coat of arms is marshalled within the national Coat of arms of Romania, it was also a component of the Coat of arms of Hungary.

Coat of arms of Transylvania by Levinus Hulsius (1596)

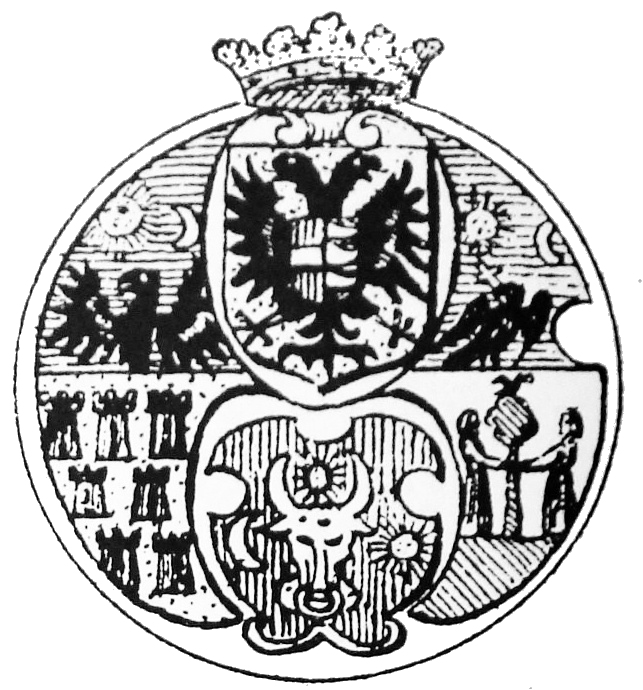
Coat of arm of Sigismund Báthory, Prince of Transylvania (1586–1598, 1598–1599, 1601–1602)

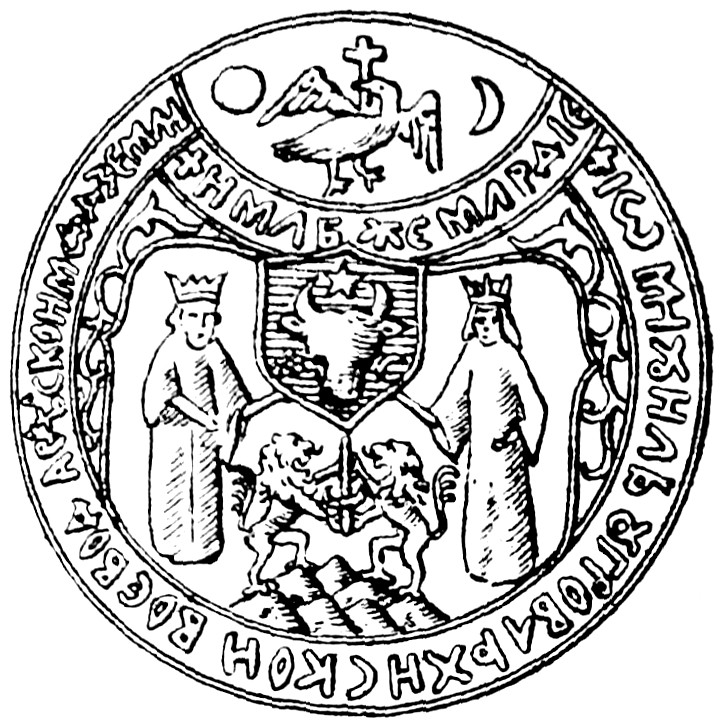
Seal of Michael the Brave during his personal union of Wallachia, Moldavia and Transylvania (1599–1600)

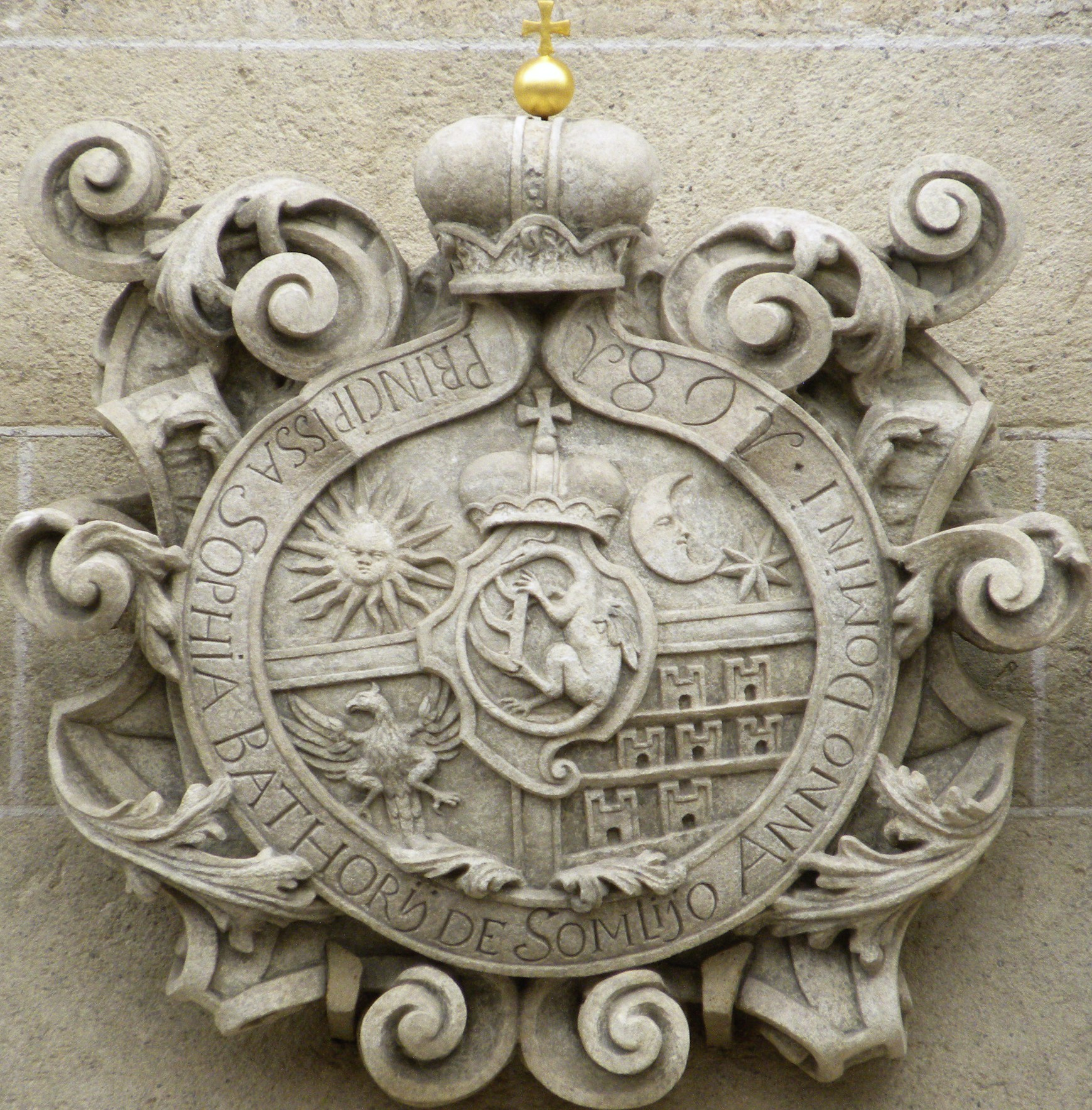
Coat of arms of Sophia Báthory, Princess of Transylvania (1642–1657, 1657–1658, 1659–1660)

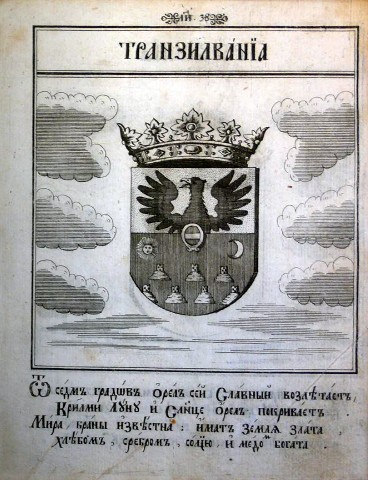
Coat of arms of Transylvania by Hristofor Žefarović (1741)

Coat of arms of Transylvania by Hugo Gerard Ströhl

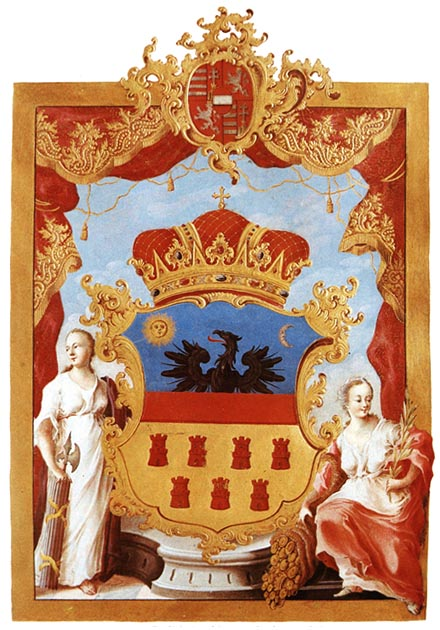
Coat of arms of Transylvania (1765)

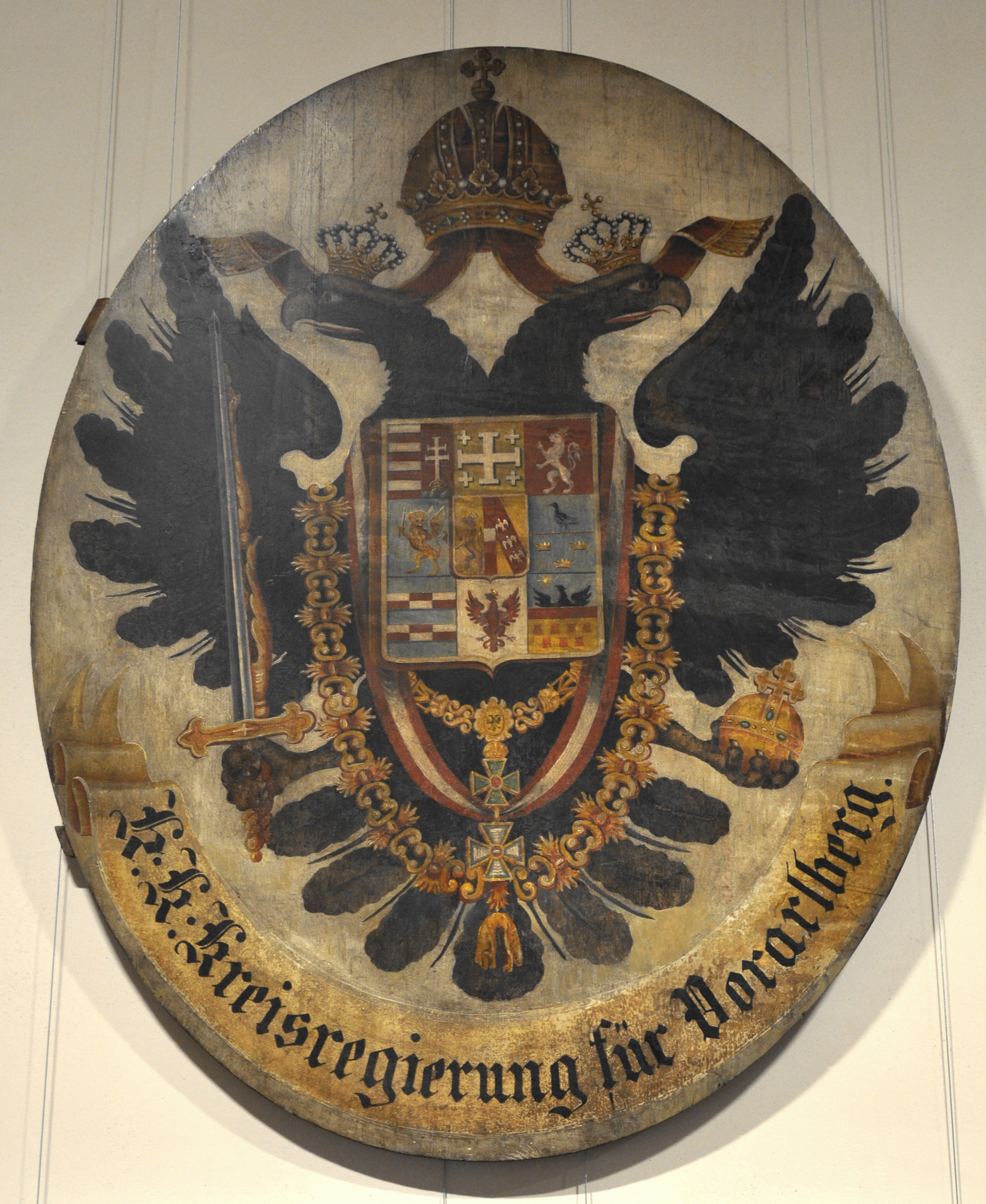
Coat of arms of Transylvania in an Austrian coat of arms (1850)

Coat of arms of Transylvania in the coat of arms of the Kingdom of Hungary (1867–1915)

Coat of arms of Transylvania in the coat of arms of the Kingdom of Hungary (1867–1915)

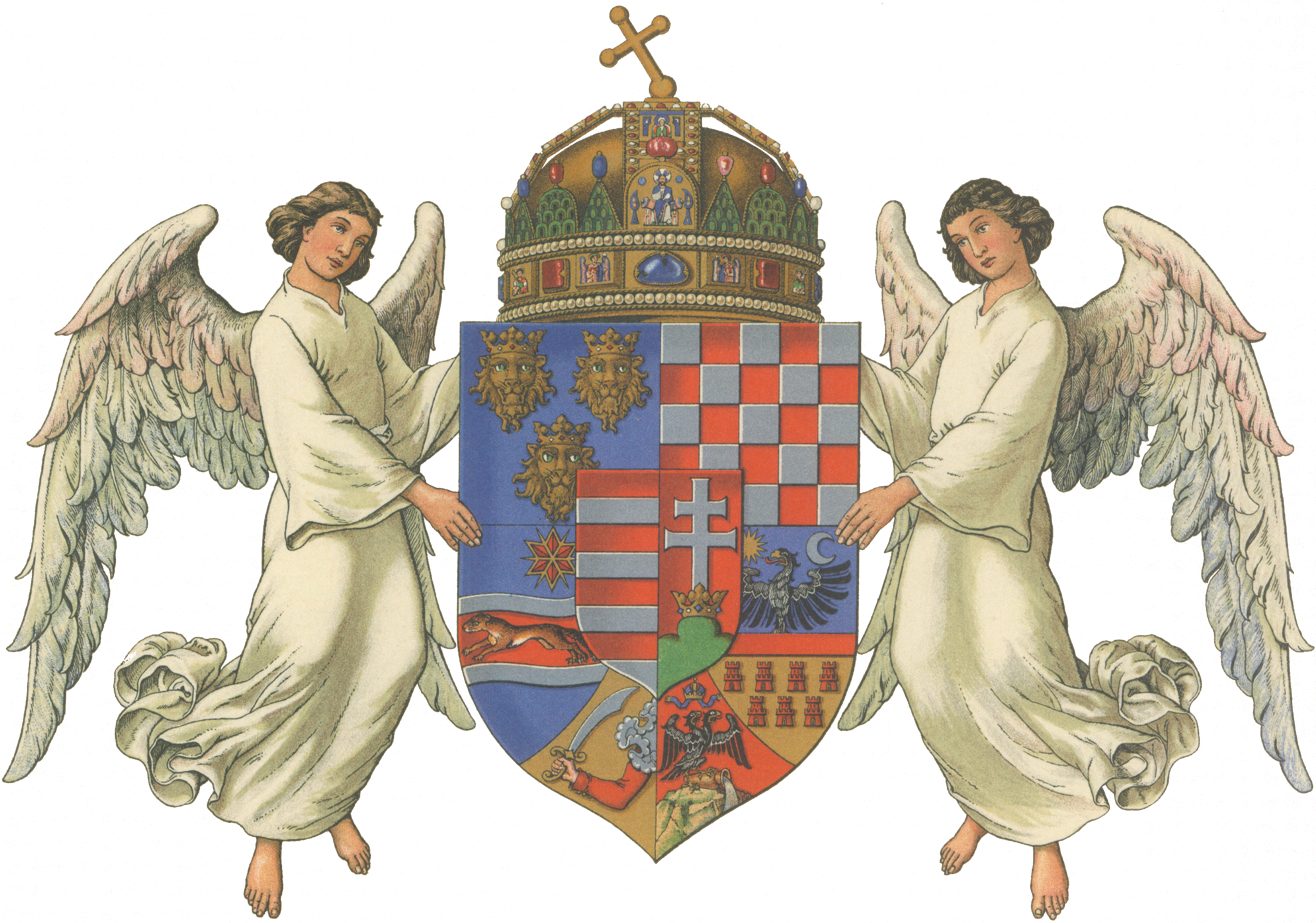
Coat of arms of Transylvania in the coat of arms of the Kingdom of Hungary (1915–1918)

Coat of arms of Transylvania in the coat of arms of the Kingdom of Romania (1921–1947)

Coat of arms of Transylvania in the coat of arms of Romania (2016)

== In popular culture ==
Following the publication of Emily Gerard's The Land Beyond the Forest (1888), Bram Stoker wrote his gothic horror novel Dracula in 1897, using Transylvania as a setting. With its success, Transylvania became associated, in the English- and Spanish-speaking worlds, with vampires. Among the first actors to portray Dracula in film was Bela Lugosi, who was born in Lugos (now Lugoj), in present-day Romania. In 1992 Francis Ford Coppola made a Hollywood movie about Dracula, based on the novel of Bram Stoker. The Japanese video game franchise Castlevania and the American animated movie franchise Hotel Transylvania also plays on the association of Transylvania with Dracula.

Transylvania has also been represented in fiction and literature as a land of mystery and magic. For example, in Paulo Coelho's novel The Witch of Portobello, the main character, Sherine Khalil, is described as a Transylvanian orphan with a Romani mother, in an effort to add to the character's exotic mystique. The so-called Transylvanian trilogy of historical novels by Miklós Bánffy, The Writing on the Wall, is an extended treatment of the 19th- and early 20th-century social and political history of the country. The Principality of Transylvania is also a playable nation in Europa Universalis IV.

== See also ==
- Prehistory of Transylvania
- Siebenbürgenlied, an unofficial anthem of Transylvania and the anthem of the Transylvanian Saxon community
- Transylvanianism
