= Półtorak =

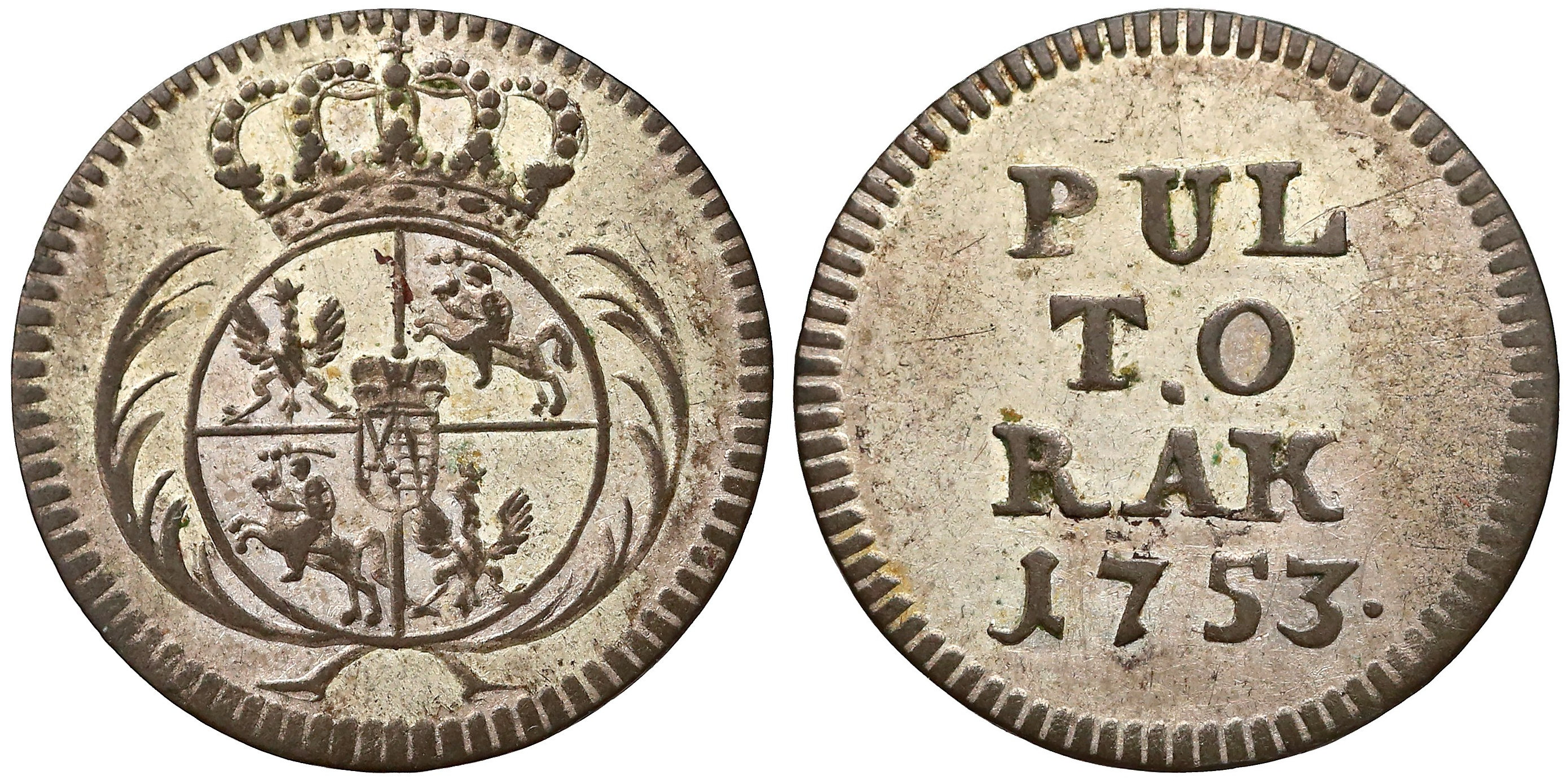
Poltorak from 1753

Półtorak (lit. one-and-a-halfer) was a small coin equal to 1½ grosz struck in the Polish–Lithuanian Commonwealth in the 17th century, during the reign of Sigismund III Vasa and John II Casimir Vasa. Initially a silver coin, with time its value deteriorated and the coin went out of use. Augustus III of Poland unsuccessfully tried to reintroduce it as a copper coin. The name stems from the Polish word "półtora" meaning one and a half.

The coin was introduced in 1614 due to the need to strike a popular coin between a grosz and a trojak (3 grosz coin). From its early days, the półtorak was a coin of relatively low value, manufactured of impure silver (grade 0.469). Intended as a coin to be used close to the borders of the Kingdom of Poland, the coin's silver content was kept low to prevent valued metals from leaving the country. Initially produced at the Cracow mint, it was also produced in Bydgoszcz and between 1619 and 1620 also in Vilna.

Initially the obverse featured the Coat of Arms of Poland, but already the following year it was replaced with the Coat of arms of the Polish–Lithuanian Commonwealth defaced with the coat of arms of the ruling House of Vasa. For most of its circulation the reverse featured a royal orb, inherited from the earlier Groschen of Brandenburg. To further facilitate international trade, both the obverse and reverse featured the number 24, signifying that the półtorak was equivalent to 1/24th of the German Thaler. It was thus one of the first coins to be issued in two different currency systems.

While ultimately withdrawn, the coin inspired the creation of Hungarian Poltura. It was also copied by mints in Sweden and Prussia. Other coins of similar design and purpose struck in Poland at the time included półgrosz (½ grosz), dwojak (2 groszes), trojak (3 groszes), czworak (4) and szóstak (6).
