= Poltorak =

Poltorak or Półtorak (from Slavic words meaning "one and a half") may refer to:

- Półtorak, a 17th-century Polish coin equivalent to 1.5 grosz
- Półtorak, a grade of Polish mead made from one part honey and half part water

== People ==
- Halina Gordon-Półtorak, Polish ice dancer
- David Poltorak, Australian television game show champion
- Piotr Półtorak, guitar player in the Analogs, a Polish street punk band
- Stepan Poltorak (born 1965), Ukrainian military commander and politician
