= Poltura =

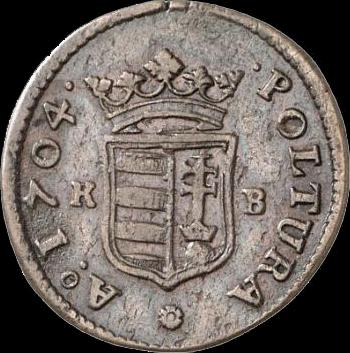
Copper poltura coin from the time of Rákóczi's War for Independence. (1704)

The poltura is a historic Hungarian monetary unit that was struck under the Hungarian rulers Leopold I, Joseph I, Francis II Rákóczi, Charles III and Maria Theresa. Its forerunner was the Polish półtorak, a coin equal to one and one-half grosz (półtora means one and a half in Polish).

After 1526 (see Battle of Mohács) Poland gained a greater role in the reorganized economy and foreign trade of Hungary. As a result, an increasing number of Polish small coins flew into the country. In Royal Hungary, Leopold I was the first who struck silver poltura on the influence of the Polish poltorak. The value of the coin was equal to ½ Groschen (Hungarian: garas) or 1½ Kreuzer (krajczár). Although even Charles III made preparations to mint poltura of copper (evidenced by trial strikes), finally it was Maria Theresa who ordered minting of copper poltura coins by the imperial patent of 27 March 1761. Joseph II, her successor did not mint polturas any more.

Under Rákóczi, polturas were initially struck from silver, but purchasing of arms required bigger and bigger portion of the noble metal reserves. Consequently, copper 1, 10 and 20 poltura coins were stuck for the inner circulation (4 poltura coins are only known as trial strikes) to replace silver coins, these can therefore be considered as emergency money. The general design included the small coat of arms of Hungary with the Holy Crown for the obverse and Madonna with the child Christ for the reverse. The coins also featured indication of year of minting and value, as well as mintmark. The most common denomination was the ten poltura coin, which was colloquially called libertás for the Latin inscription PRO LIBERTATE (for liberty).

== Sources ==
- Münzen Lexikon - Poltura
- Magyar katolikus lexikon (Hungarian Catholic Encyclopedia) - Magyar pénztörténet (Hungarian Money History)
- Pallas Nagy Lexikona (Pallas' Great Encyclopedia) - Poltura
