= Półgrosz =

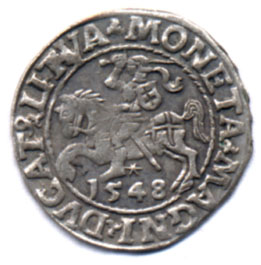
Lithuanian półgrosz from 1548

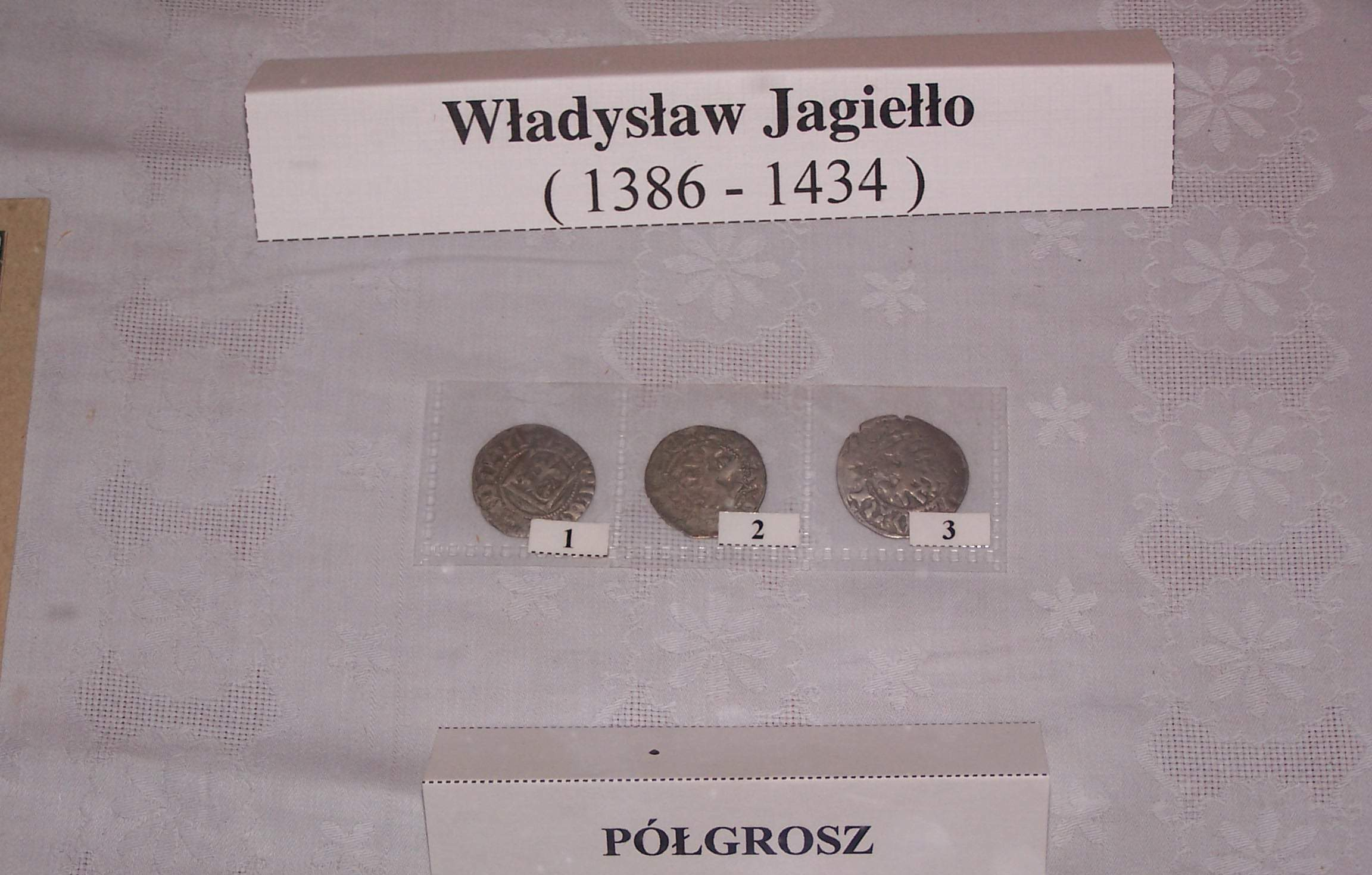
Three Półgrosz coins of Władysław Jagiełło

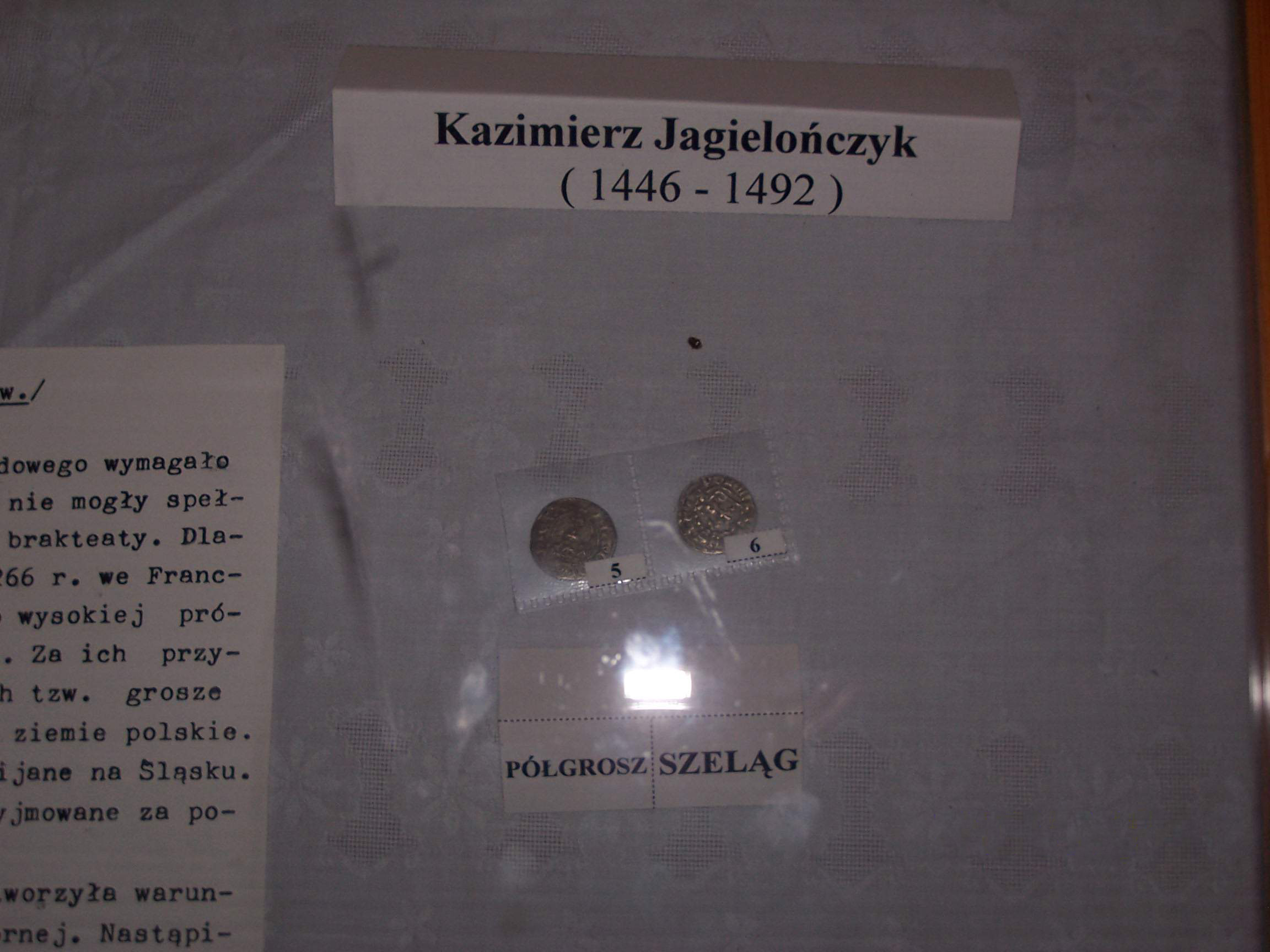
Półgrosz (left) and szeląg (right)

Półgrosz (półgroszek, lit. half-grosz) was a silver and later copper coin worth ½ of grosz and 9 denars, minted in Poland, Lithuania and Silesia. Polish silver półgrosz weighing 1-1,7g was minted mainly from c.1367 to 1526 and occasionally from 1580 to 1792, from 1765 coin was minted in copper. Lithuanian silver półgrosz weighing c.1,3g was minted in 1495–1566.
