= Coat of arms of the Polish–Lithuanian Commonwealth =

Coat of arms of the Polish-Lithuanian Commonwealth
- House of Vasa (16th to 17th century)
- Armiger: King of Poland and Grand Duke of Lithuania
- Adopted: Following 1386 (Note: Adopted after the Union of Krewo, 184 years before the creation of the Commonwealth.)
- Shield: Quarterly 1st and 4th Gules, an eagle argent, crowned or; 2nd and 3rd, Gules, Pogonia.

The coat of arms of the Polish–Lithuanian Commonwealth represented the union of the Crown of the Polish Kingdom and Grand Duchy of Lithuania.

While the coat of arms remained mostly unchanged throughout the Commonwealth's tenure, as different kings were elected it would be defaced with their personal arms and other features, such as the Order of the Golden Fleece (when the armiger was a member) or the Order of the White Eagle for later kings.

== Modern reconstruction ==
Greater coat of arms of the Polish–Lithuanian Commonwealth during the reign of Sigismund I Augustus (1520–1572)

Lesser coat of arms of the Polish–Lithuanian Commonwealth during the reign of Sigismund I Augustus (1520–1572)

Greater coat of arms of the Polish–Lithuanian Commonwealth during the reign of Henryk Walezy (1573–1575)

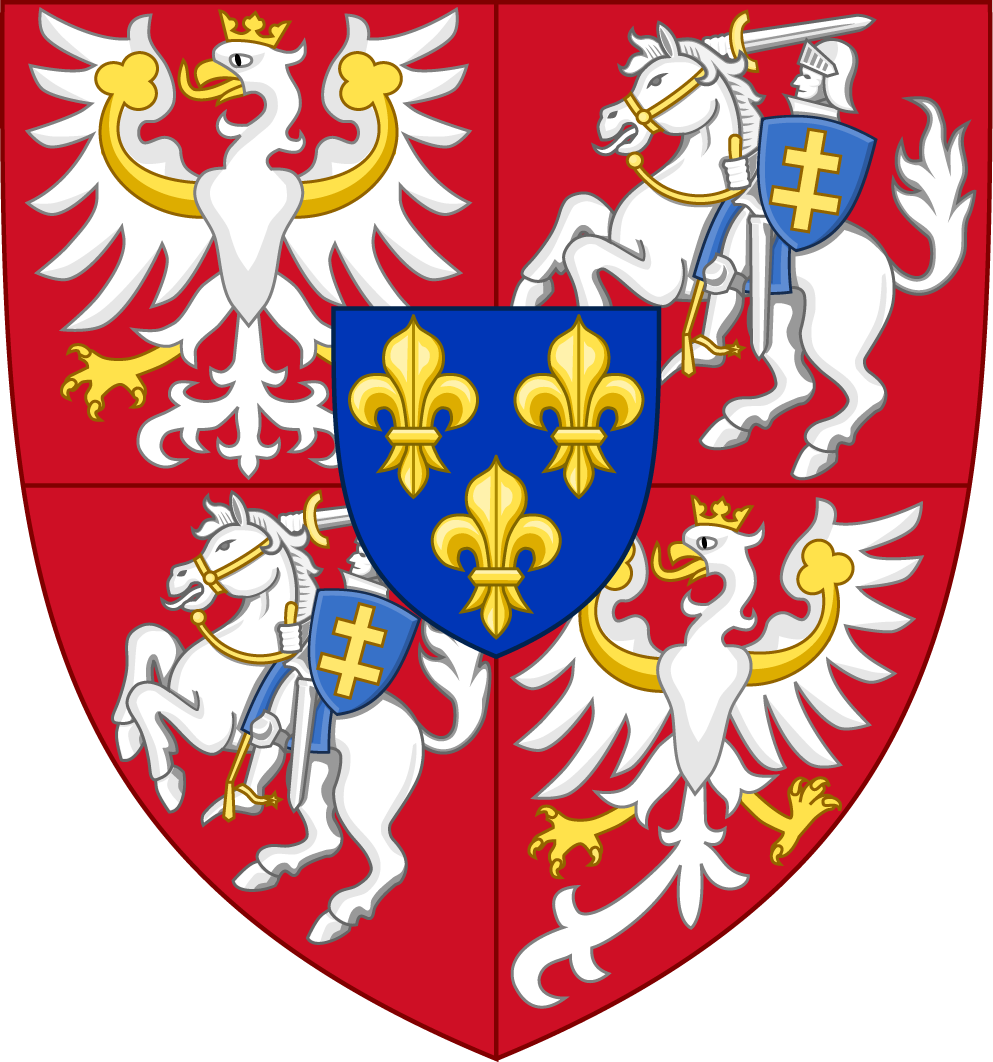
Lesser coat of arms of the Polish–Lithuanian Commonwealth during the reign of Henryk Walezy (1573–1575)

Greater coat of arms of the Polish–Lithuanian Commonwealth during the reign of Stephen Báthory (1576–1586)

Lesser coat of arms of the Polish–Lithuanian Commonwealth during the reign of Stephen Báthory (1576–1586)

Greater coat of arms of the Polish–Lithuanian Commonwealth during the reign of the kings from the House of Vasa (1587–1668)

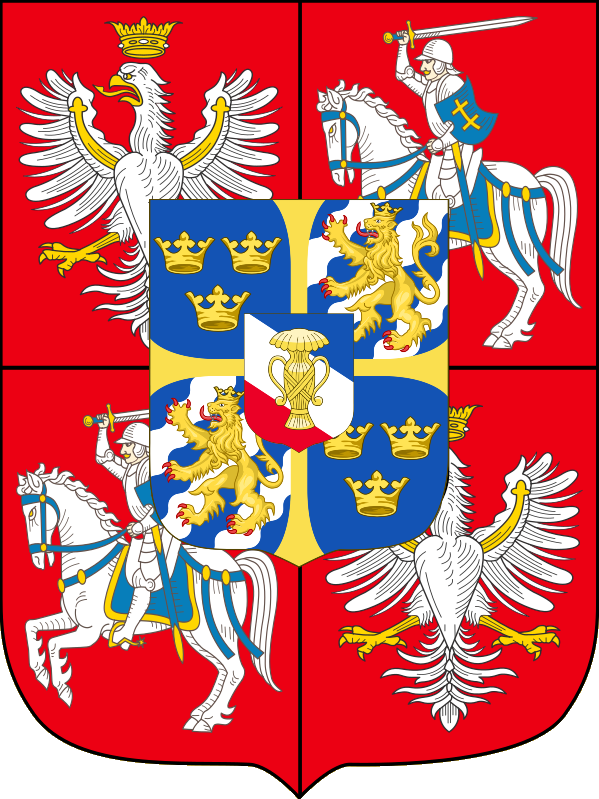
Lesser coat of arms of the Polish–Lithuanian Commonwealth during the reign of the kings from the House of Vasa (1587–1668)

Greater coat of arms of the Polish–Lithuanian Commonwealth during the reign of Micheal I Wiśniowiecki (1669–1673)

Lesser coat of arms of the Polish–Lithuanian Commonwealth during the reign of Micheal I Wiśniowiecki (1669–1673)

Greater coat of arms of the Polish–Lithuanian Commonwealth during the reign of John III Sobieski (1674–1696)

Lesser coat of arms of the Polish–Lithuanian Commonwealth during the reign of John III Sobieski (1674–1696)

Greater coat of arms of the Polish–Lithuanian Commonwealth during the reign of the kings from the House of Wettin (1697–1704, 1709–1733, 1736–1763)

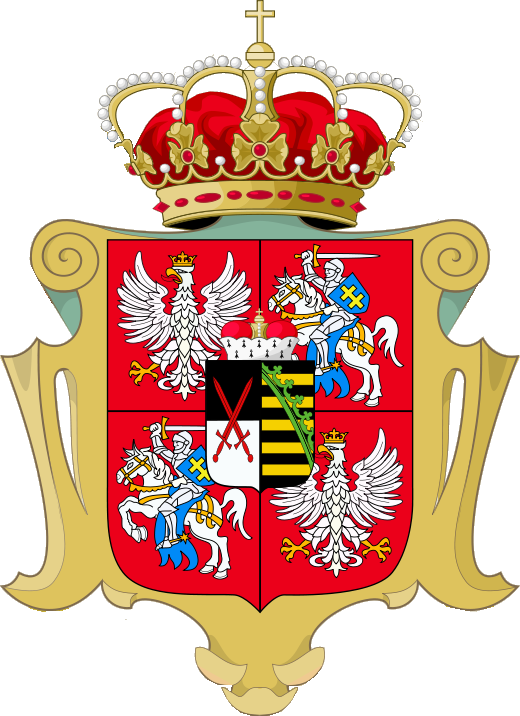
Lesser coat of arms of the Polish–Lithuanian Commonwealth during the reign of the kings from the House of Wettin (1697–1704, 1709–1733, 1736–1763)

Greater coat of arms of the Polish–Lithuanian Commonwealth during the reign of Stanisław I Leszczyński (1704–1709, 1733–1736)

Lesser coat of arms of the Polish–Lithuanian Commonwealth during the reign of Stanisław I Leszczyński (1704–1709, 1733–1736)

Greater coat of arms of the Polish–Lithuanian Commonwealth during the reign of Stanisław II August Poniatowski (1764–1795)

Lesser coat of arms of the Polish–Lithuanian Commonwealth during the reign of Stanisław II August Poniatowski (1764–1795)

== Background ==
The coat of arms of the Commonwealth combined the coat of arms of the Kingdom of Poland and the Grand Duchy of Lithuania, which are depicted as follows:

Coat of arms of Poland, the White Eagle

Coat of arms of Lithuania, the White Knight

During the Commonwealth, an inescutcheon contained the personal or family arms of the reigning monarch.

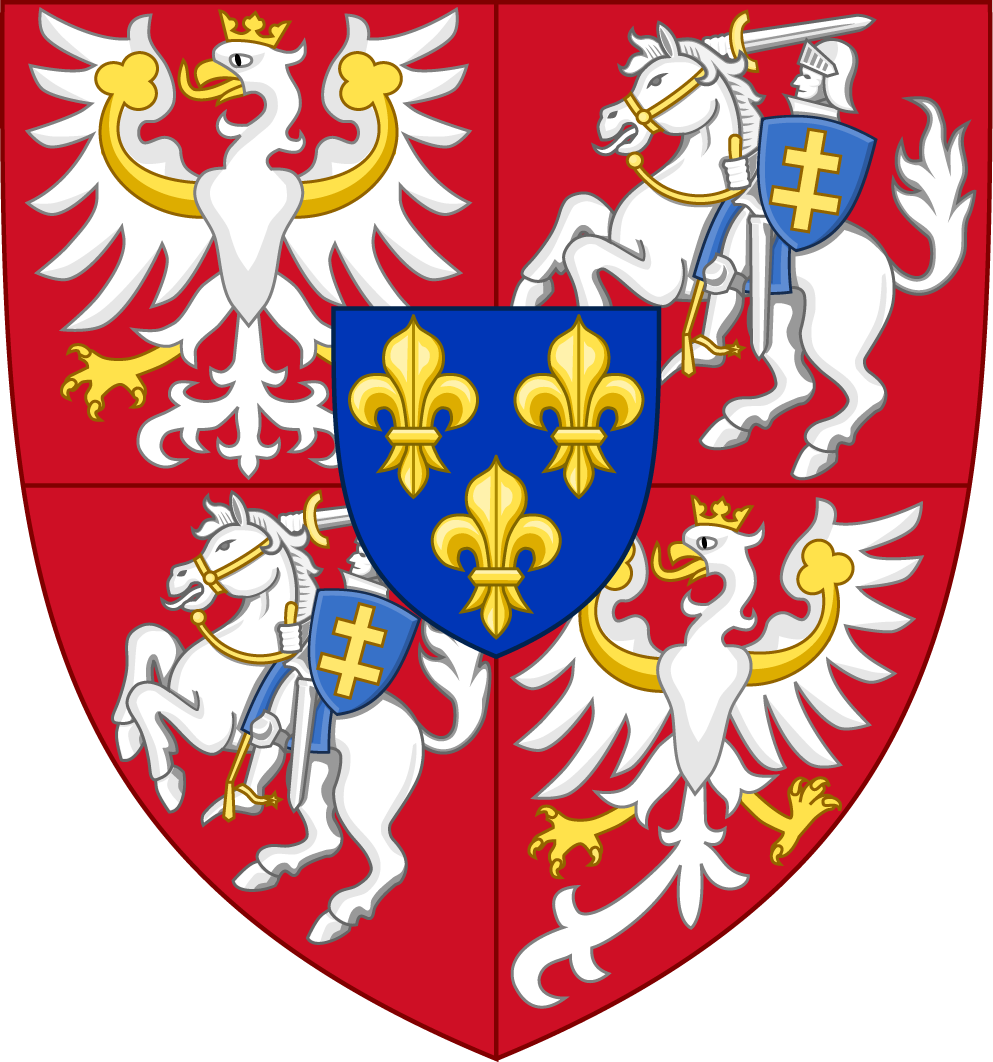
Polish–Lithuanian coat of arms under King Henry

Polish–Lithuanian coat of arms under Vasa dynasty

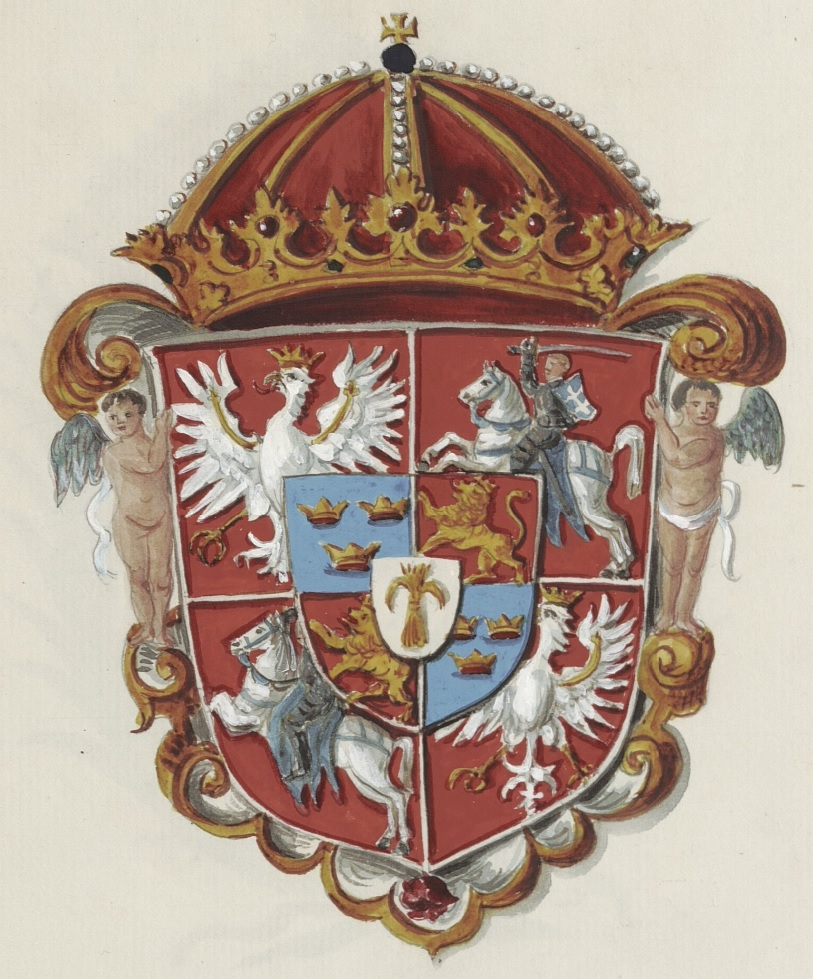
Polish–Lithuanian coat of arms under Vasa dynasty

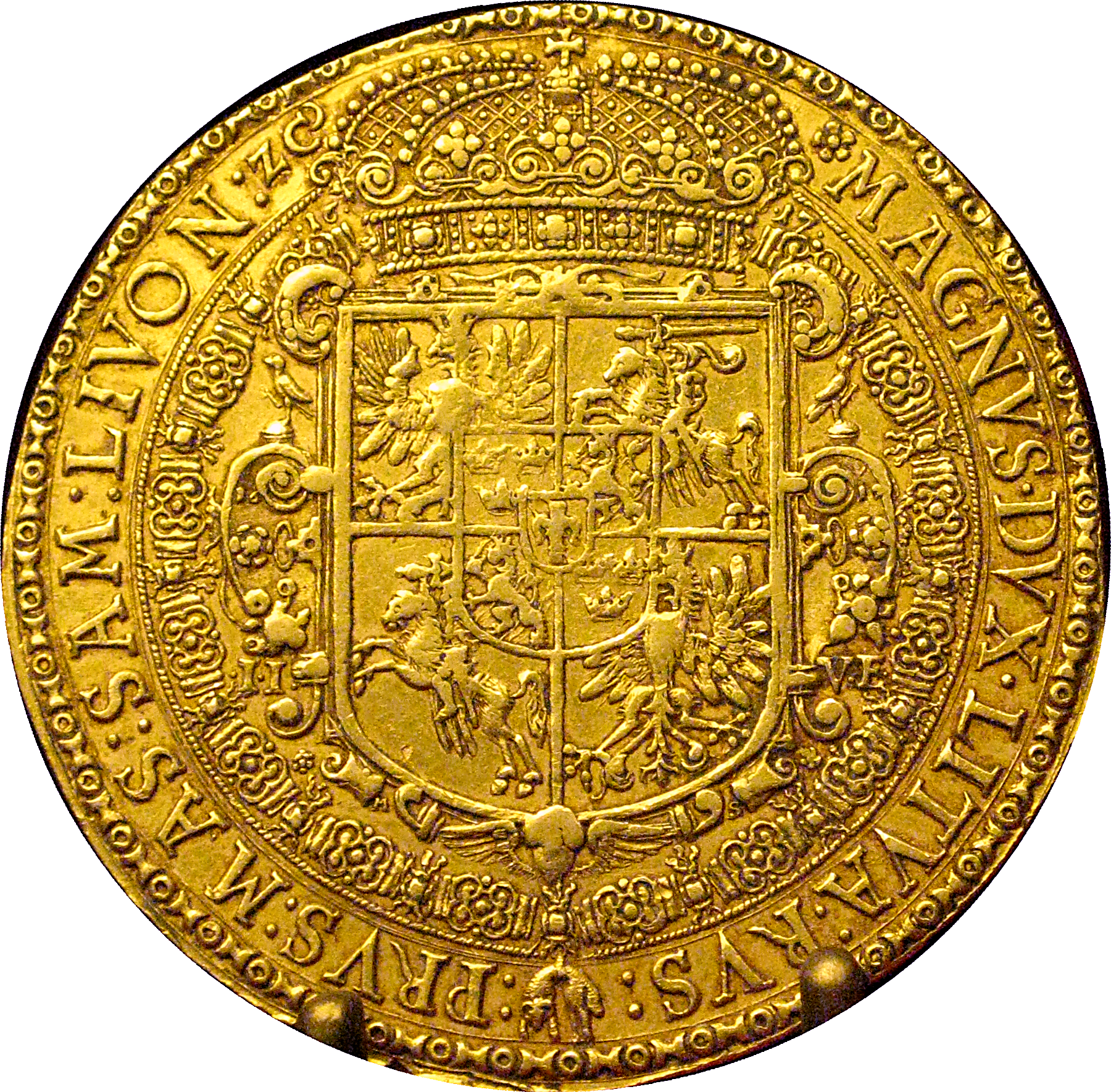
15 ducats of King Sigismund III Vasa from 1617

Polish–Lithuanian coat of arms under Michael I. Korybut coat of arms is placed in the escutcheon point.

Polish–Lithuanian coat of arms under John III Sobieski. Janina coat of arms is placed in the escutcheon point.

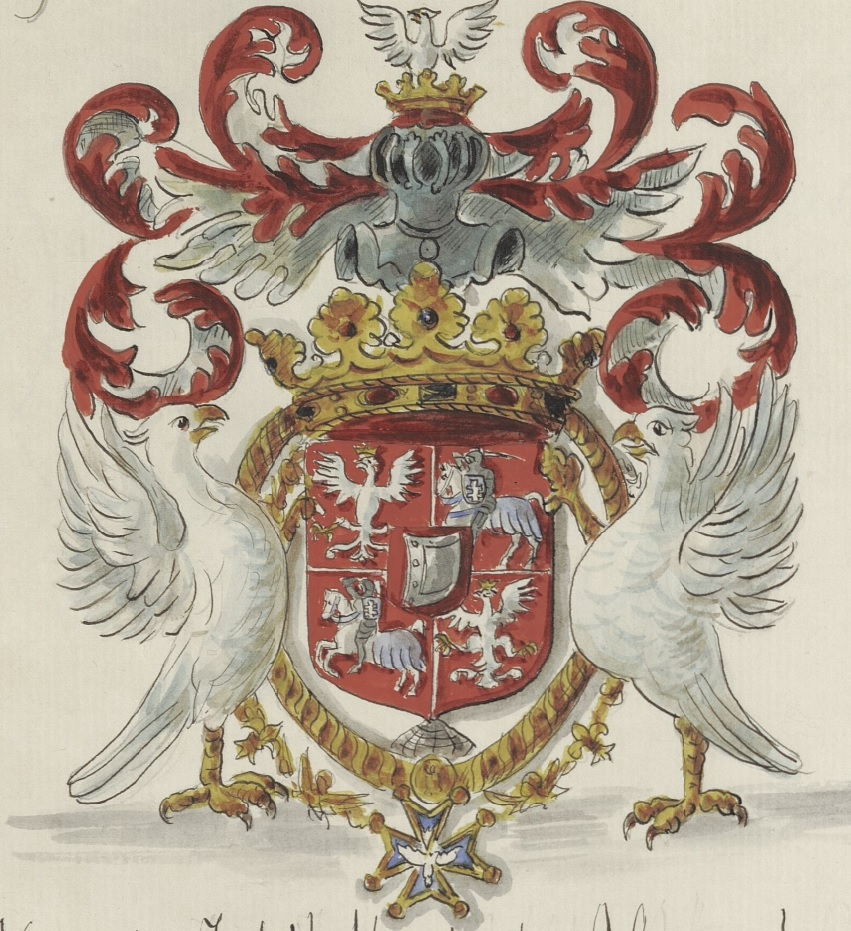
Polish–Lithuanian coat of arms under John III Sobieski. Janina coat of arms is placed in the escutcheon point.

Polish–Lithuanian coat of arms under Stanisław I. Wieniawa coat of arms is placed in the escutcheon point.

Polish–Lithuanian coat of arms under Wettin dynasty

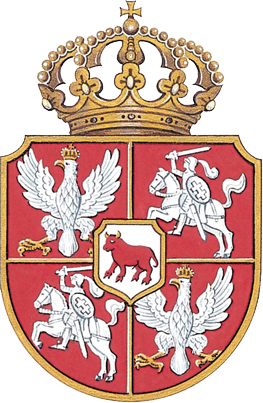
Polish–Lithuanian coat of arms under Stanislaus II Augustus. Ciołek coat of arms is placed in the escutcheon point.

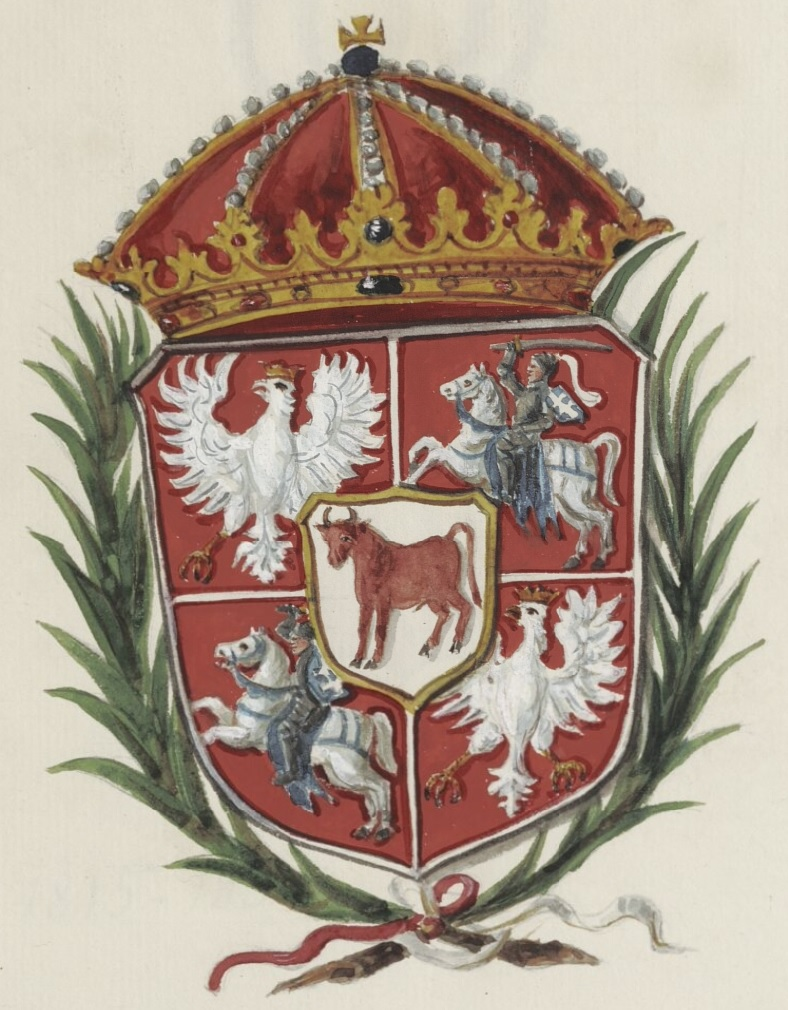
Polish–Lithuanian coat of arms under Stanislaus II Augustus, 1764–1795

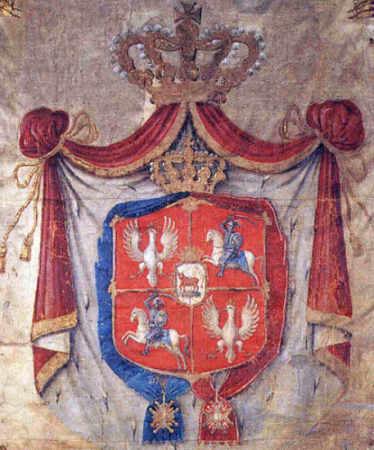
Coat of arms of Stanislaus II Augustus, 1780

== Insurrections ==
During the January uprising a similar coat of arms was proposed for the restored Commonwealth, with Archangel Michael, the coat of arms of Ruthenia added as the third element. However, it was never officially introduced.

Coat of arms for a proposed Polish–
Lithuanian–Ruthenian Commonwealth

== The coat of arms in various cities ==
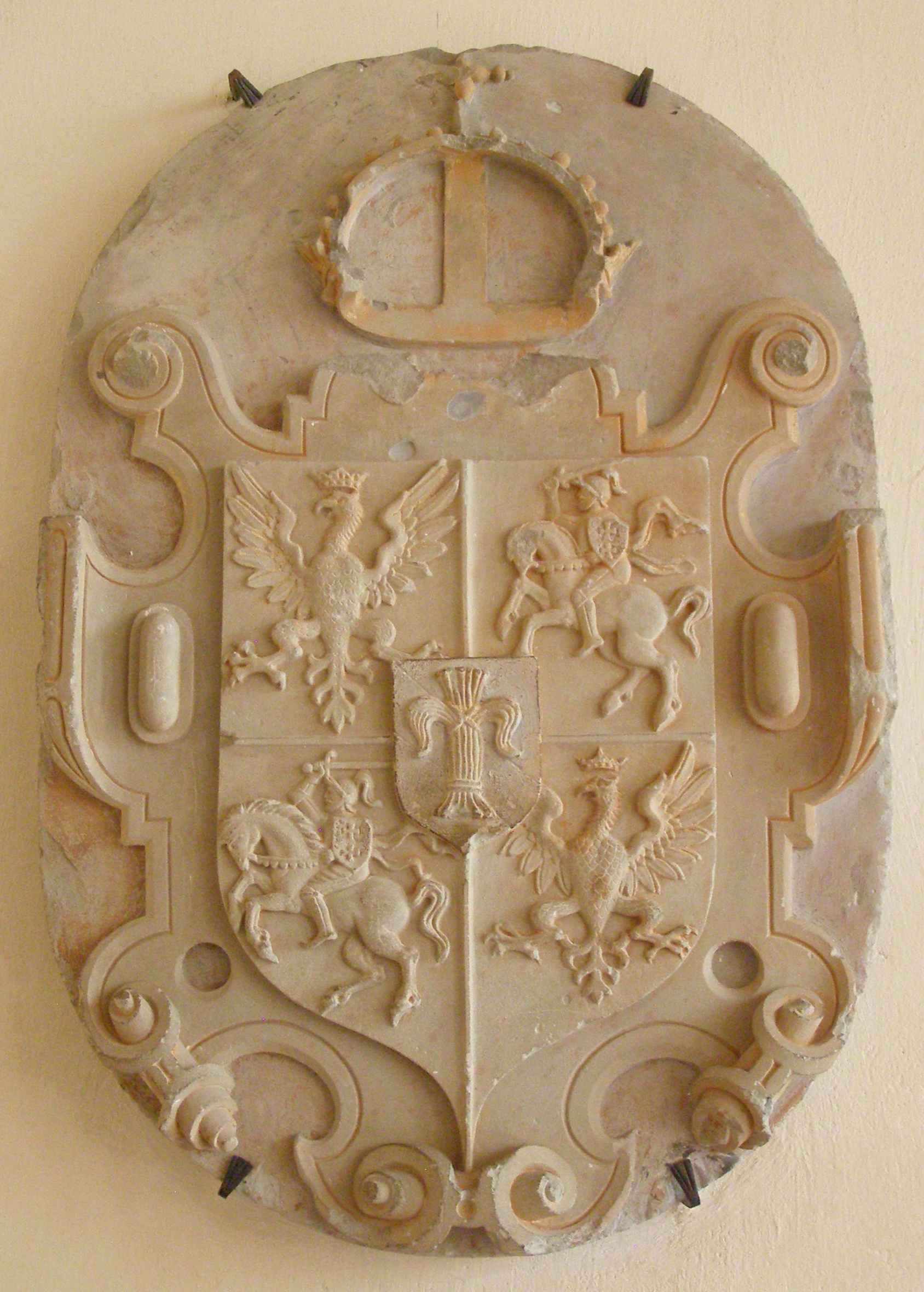
Malbork Castle, Malbork, 1590s

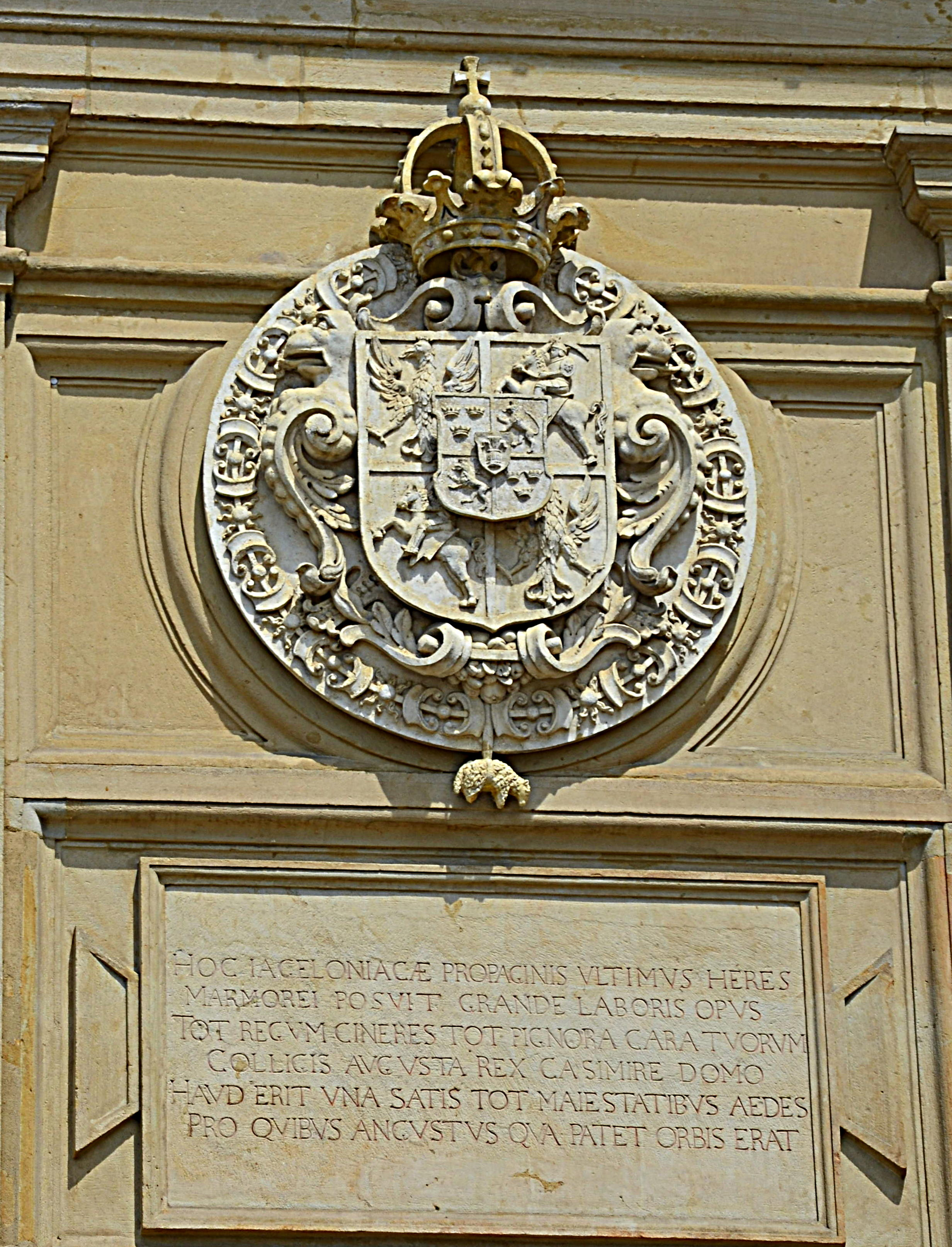
Wawel, Kraków

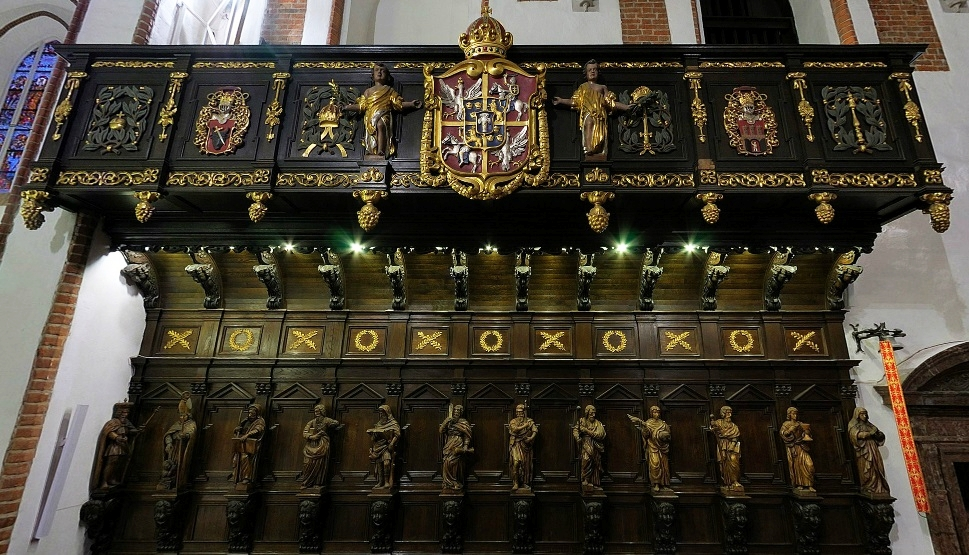
St. John's Archcathedral, Warsaw, 17th century

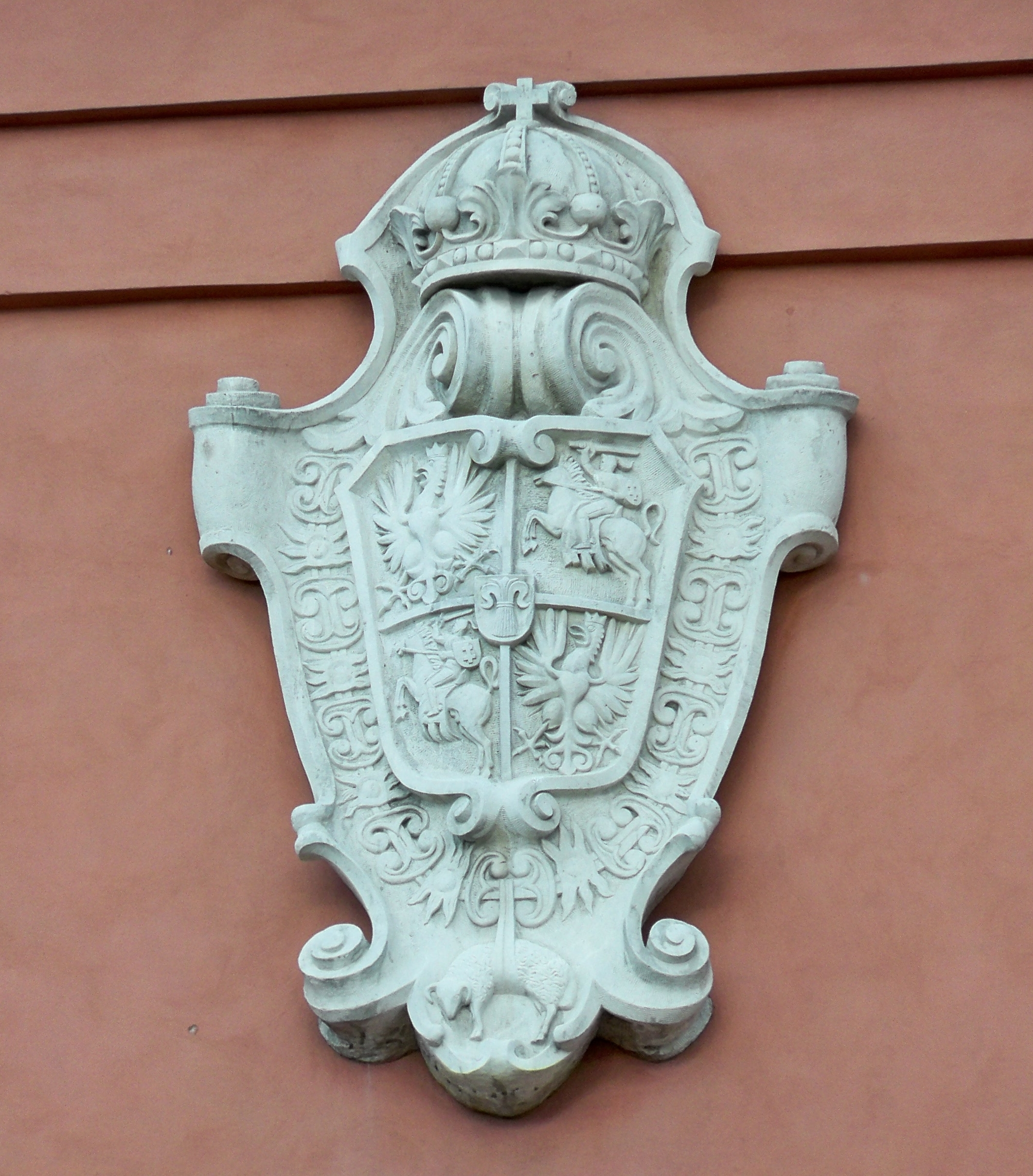
Royal Castle, Warsaw, 17th century

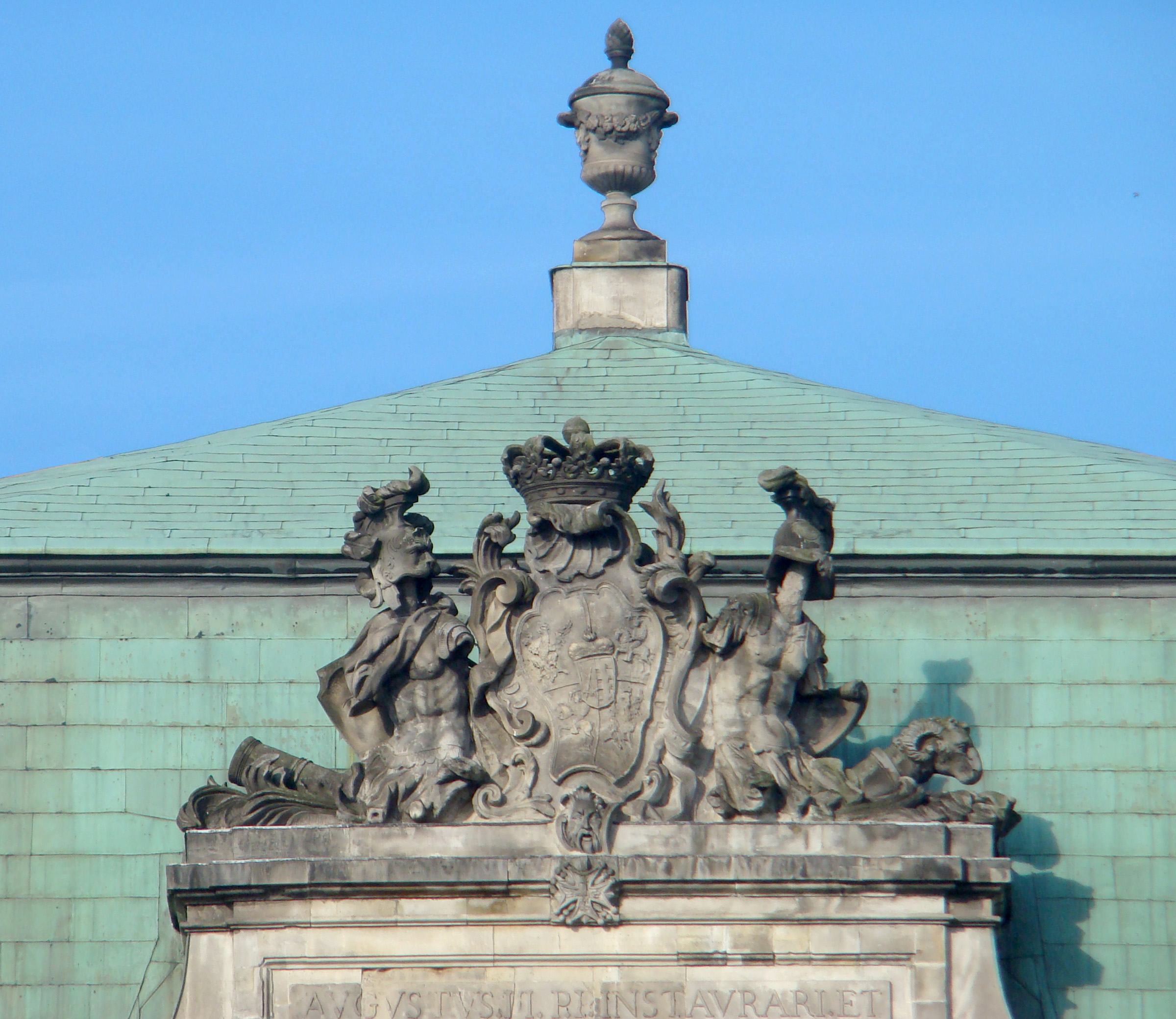
Royal Castle, Warsaw, 18th century

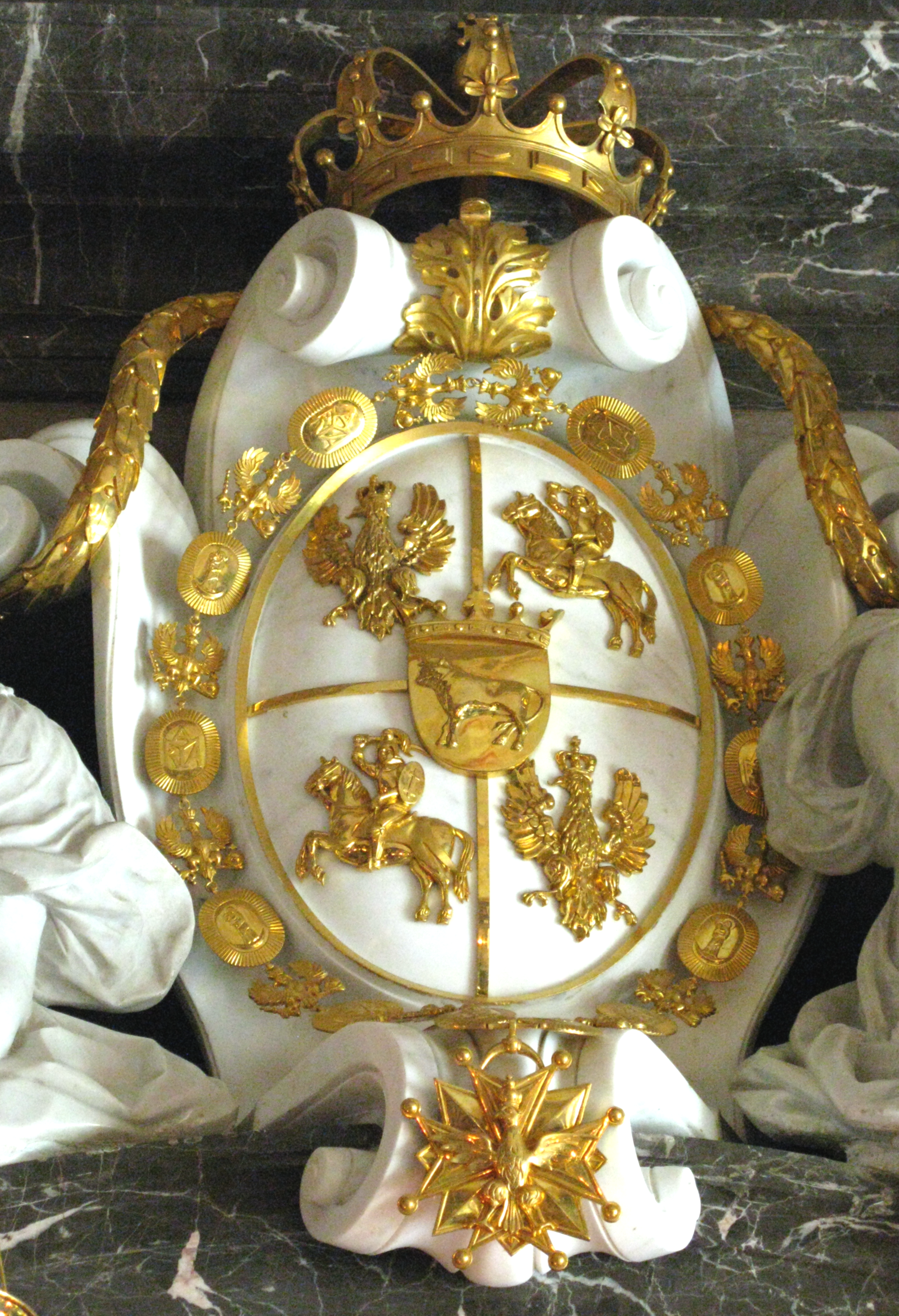
Royal Castle, Warsaw, 18th century

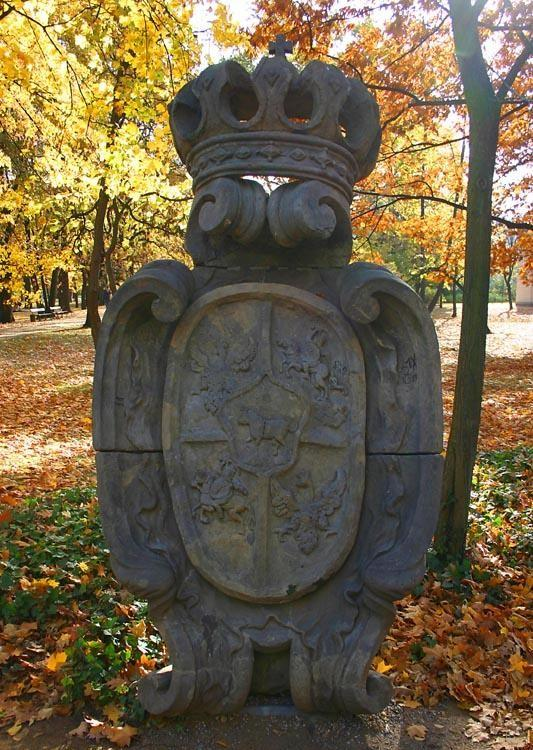
Łazienki Park, Warsaw, 18th century

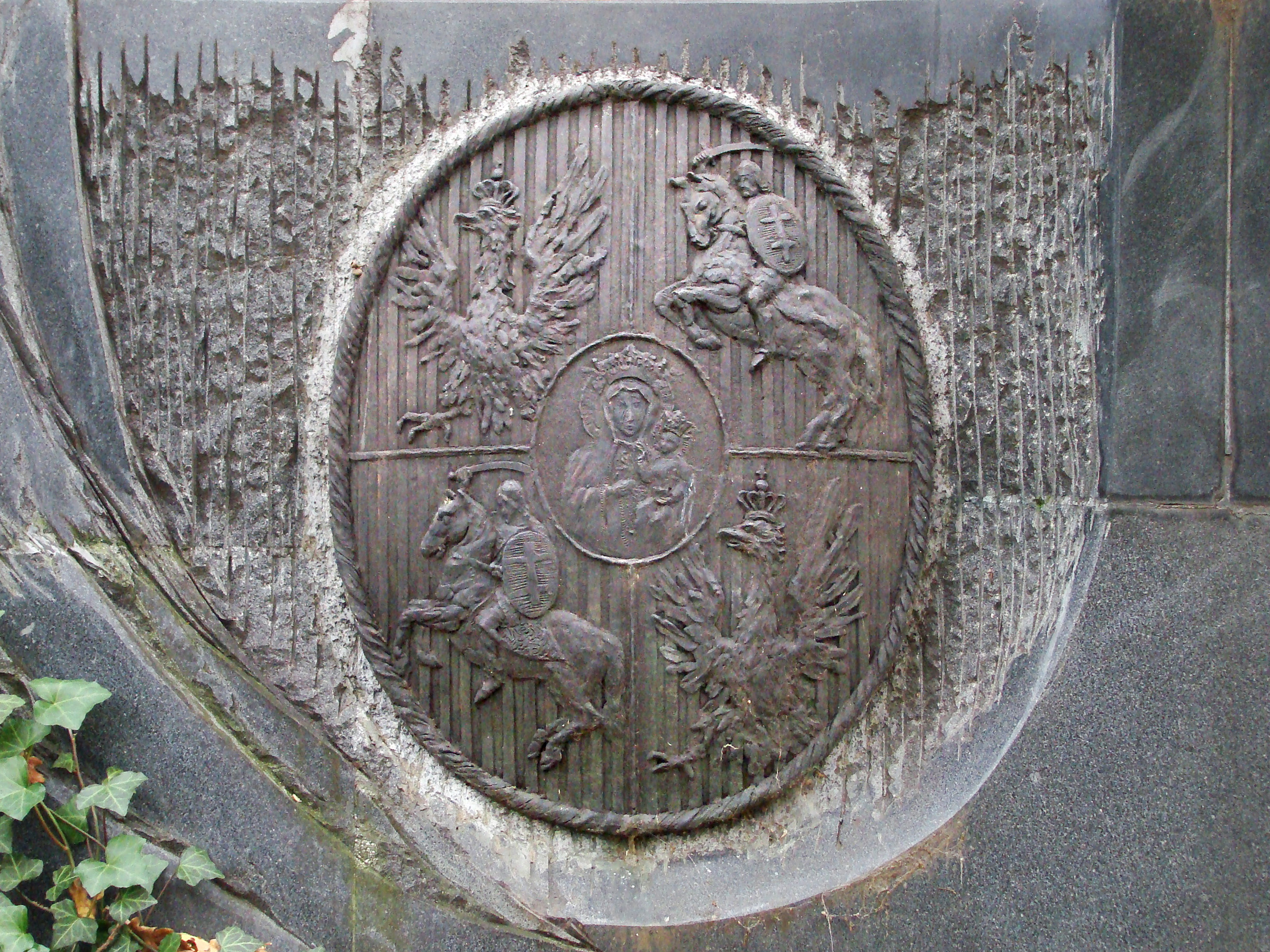
Henryk Sienkiewicz Monument, Łazienki Park, Warsaw, 20th century

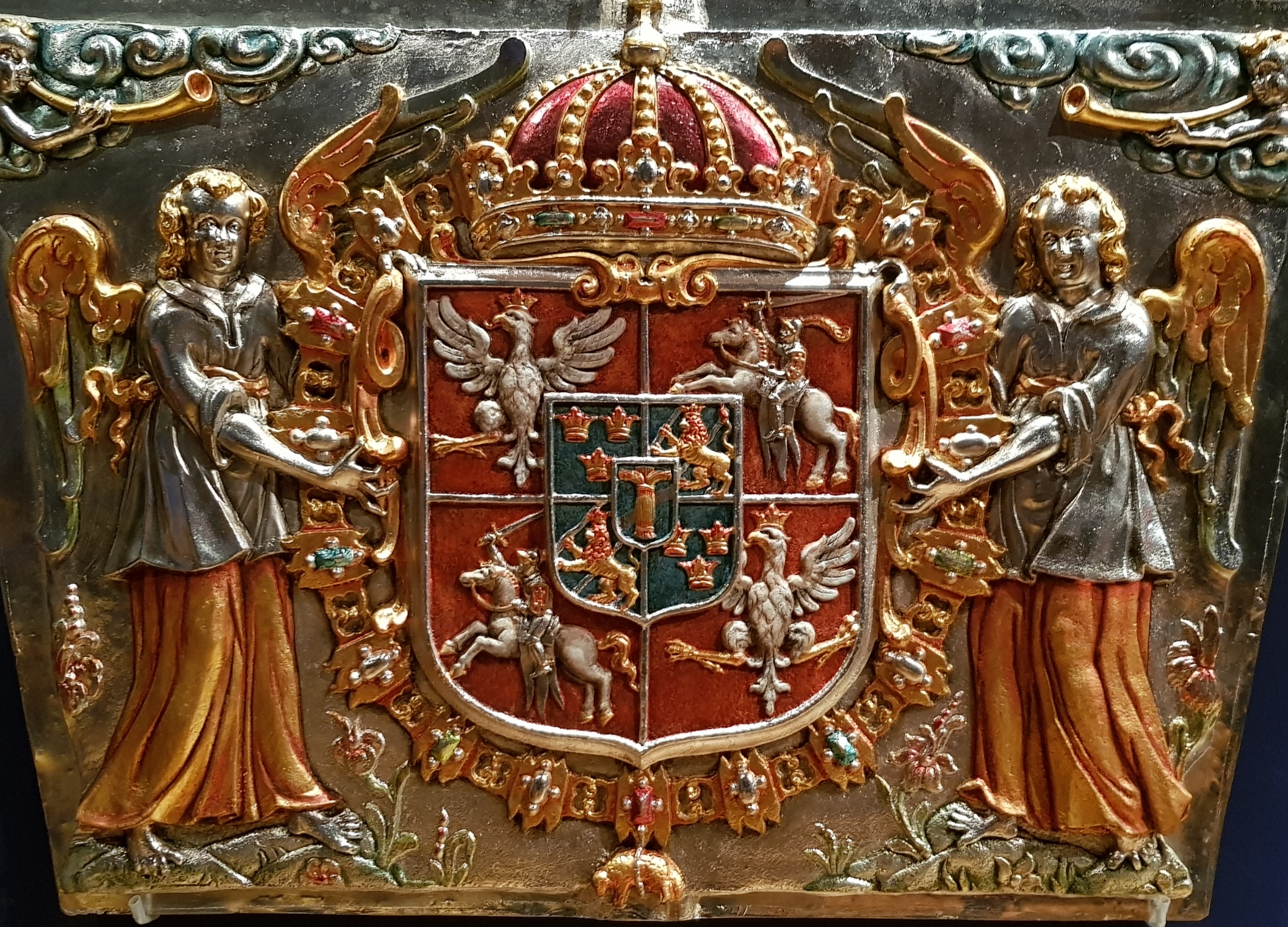
Wawel Cathedral, Kraków, 1633

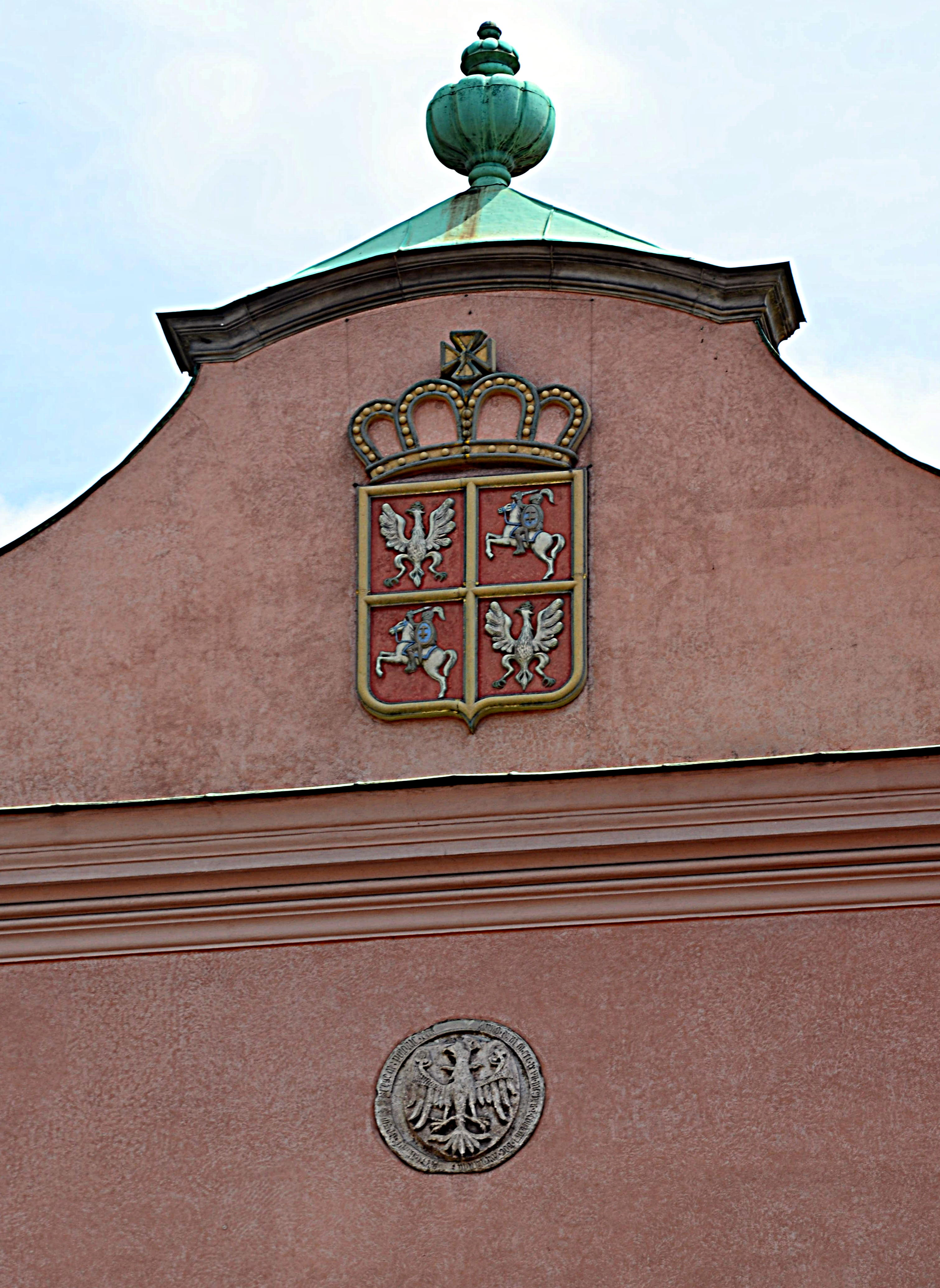
Wawel, Kraków

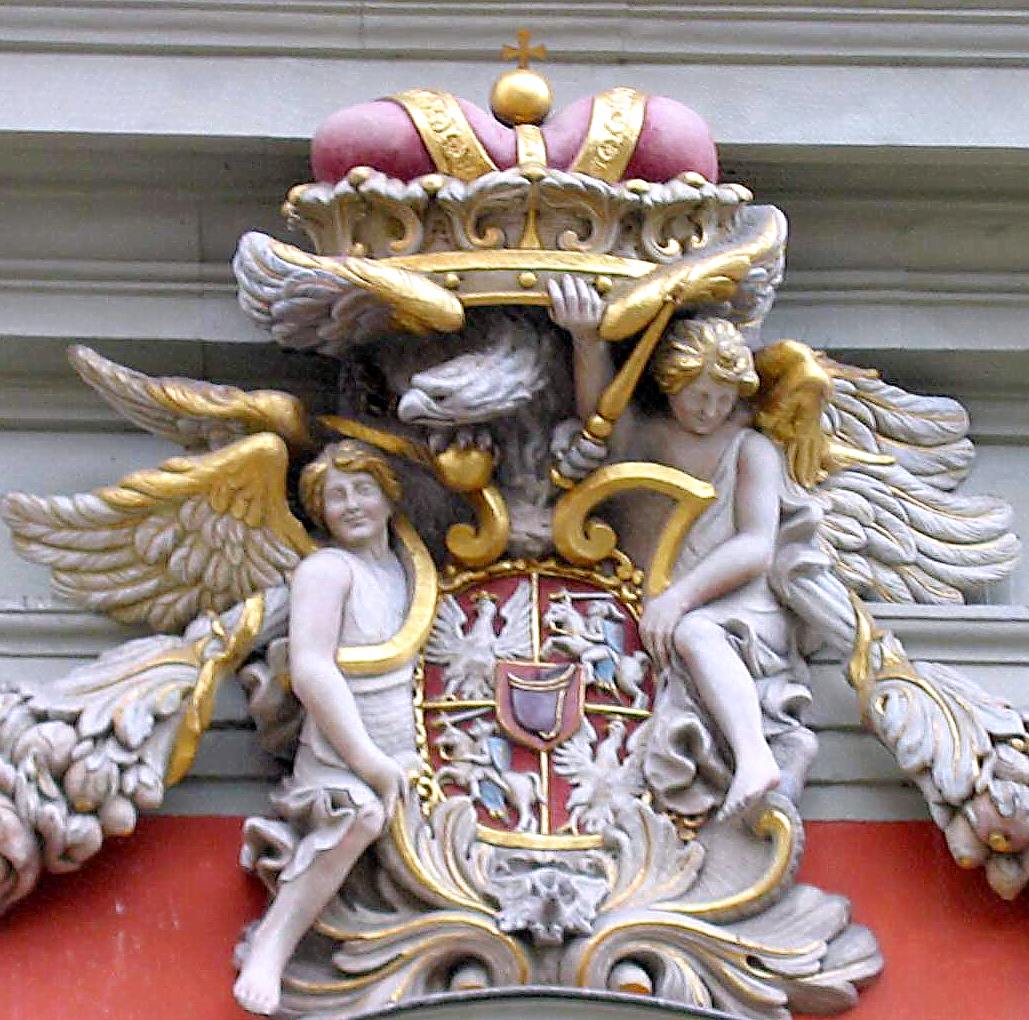
Royal Chapel, Gdańsk, 1681

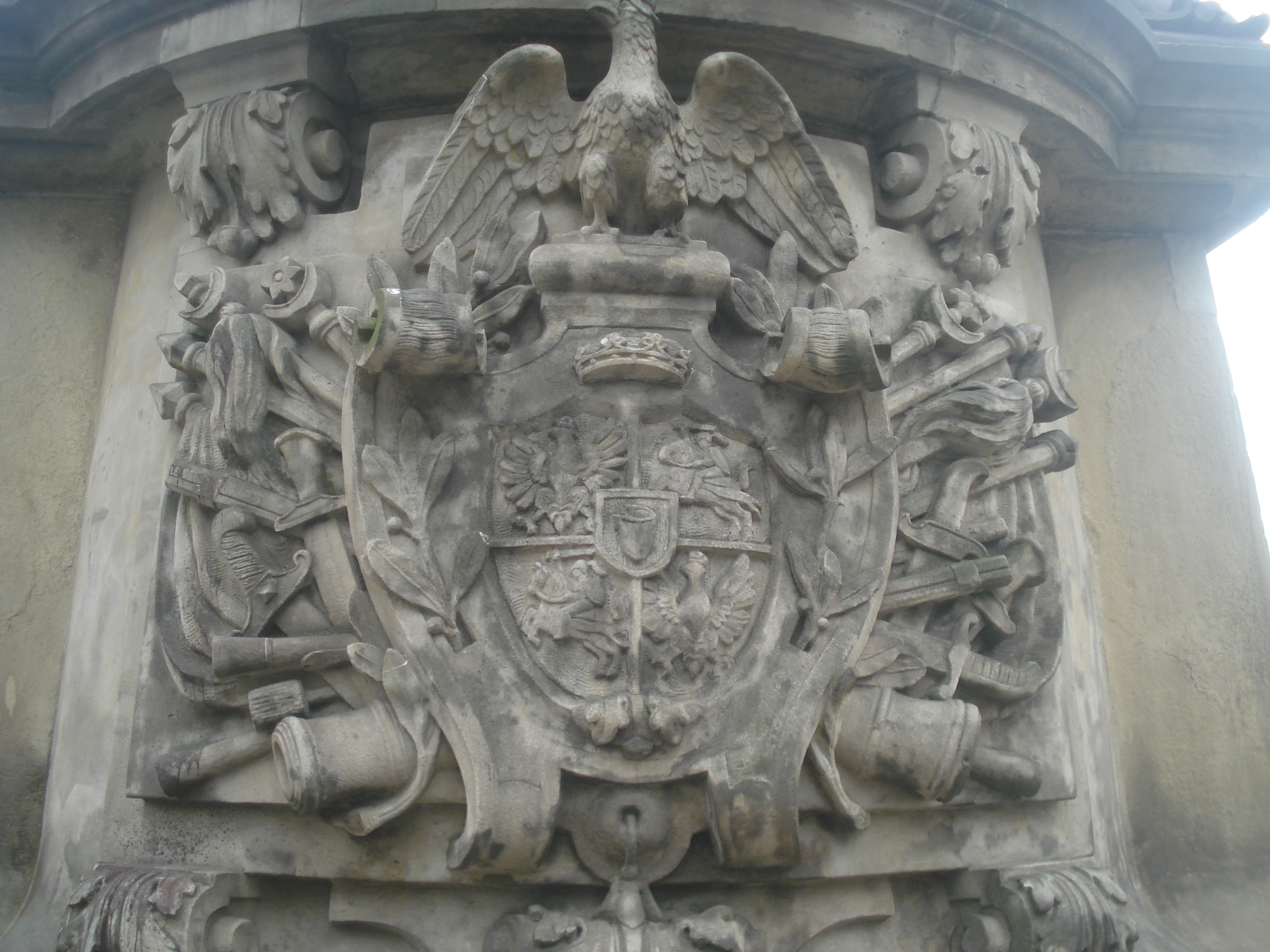
John III Sobieski Monument, Gdańsk (moved from Lviv), 1898

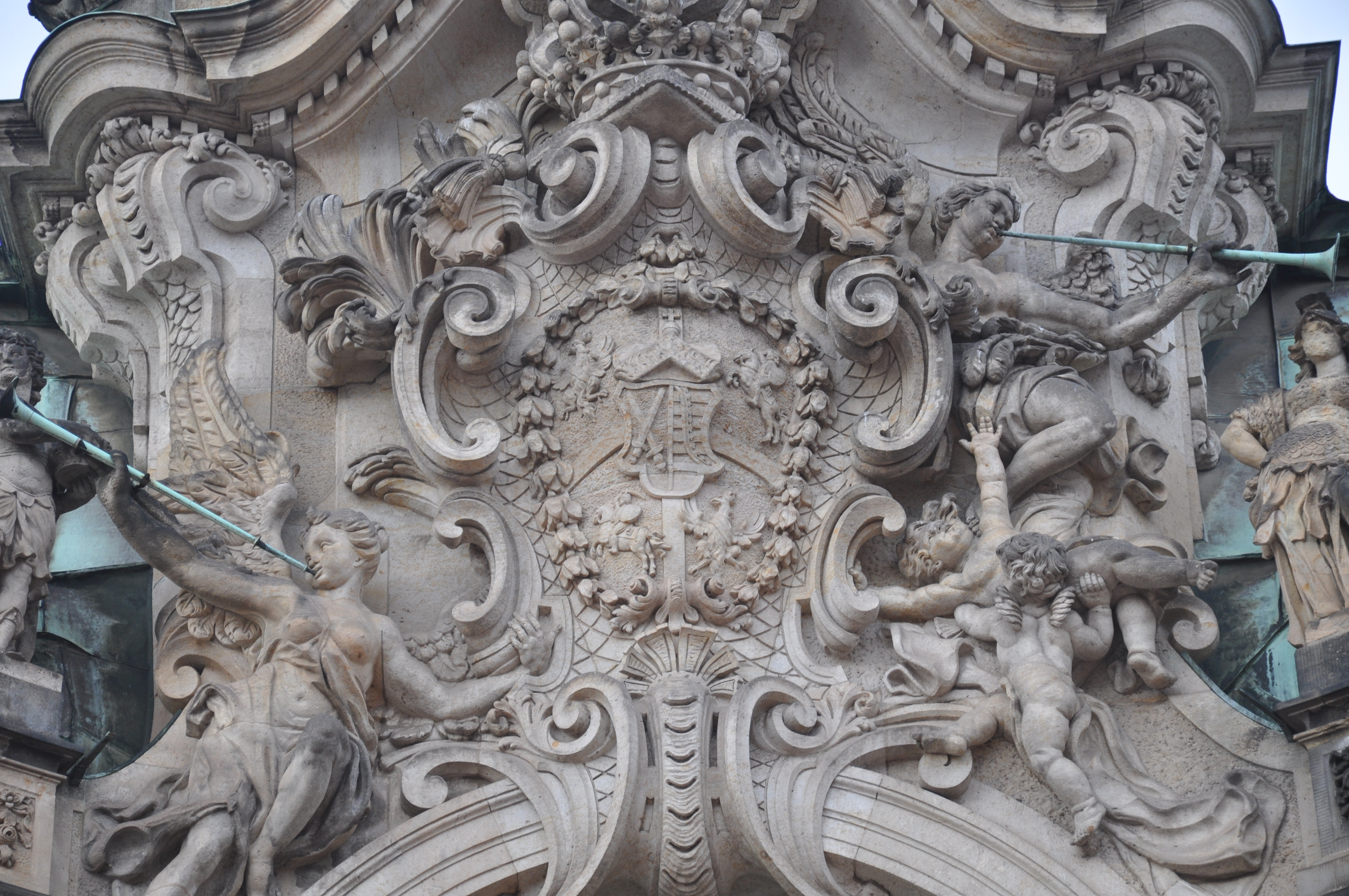
Zwinger, Dresden, 18th century

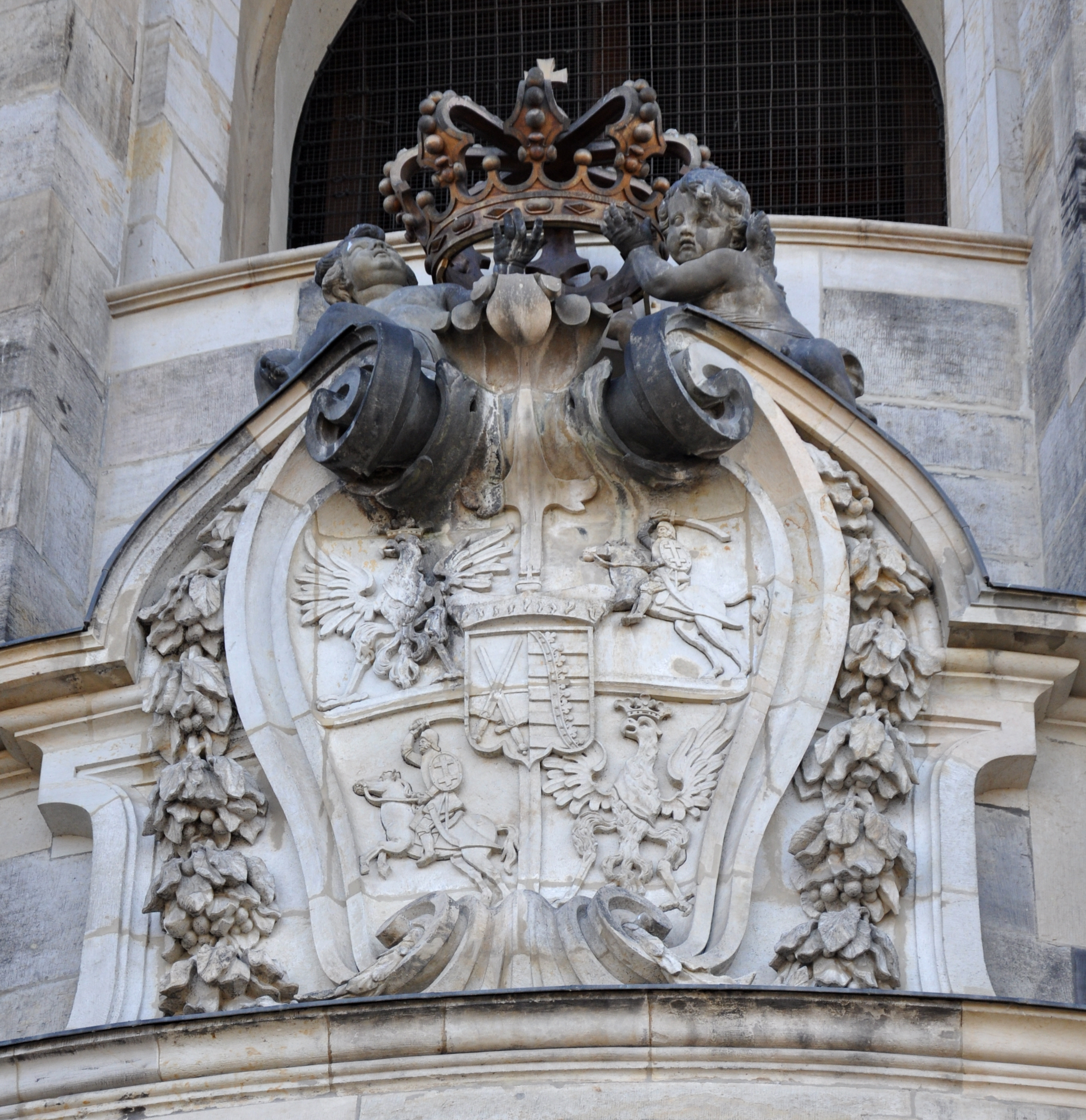
Dresden Cathedral, Dresden, 18th century

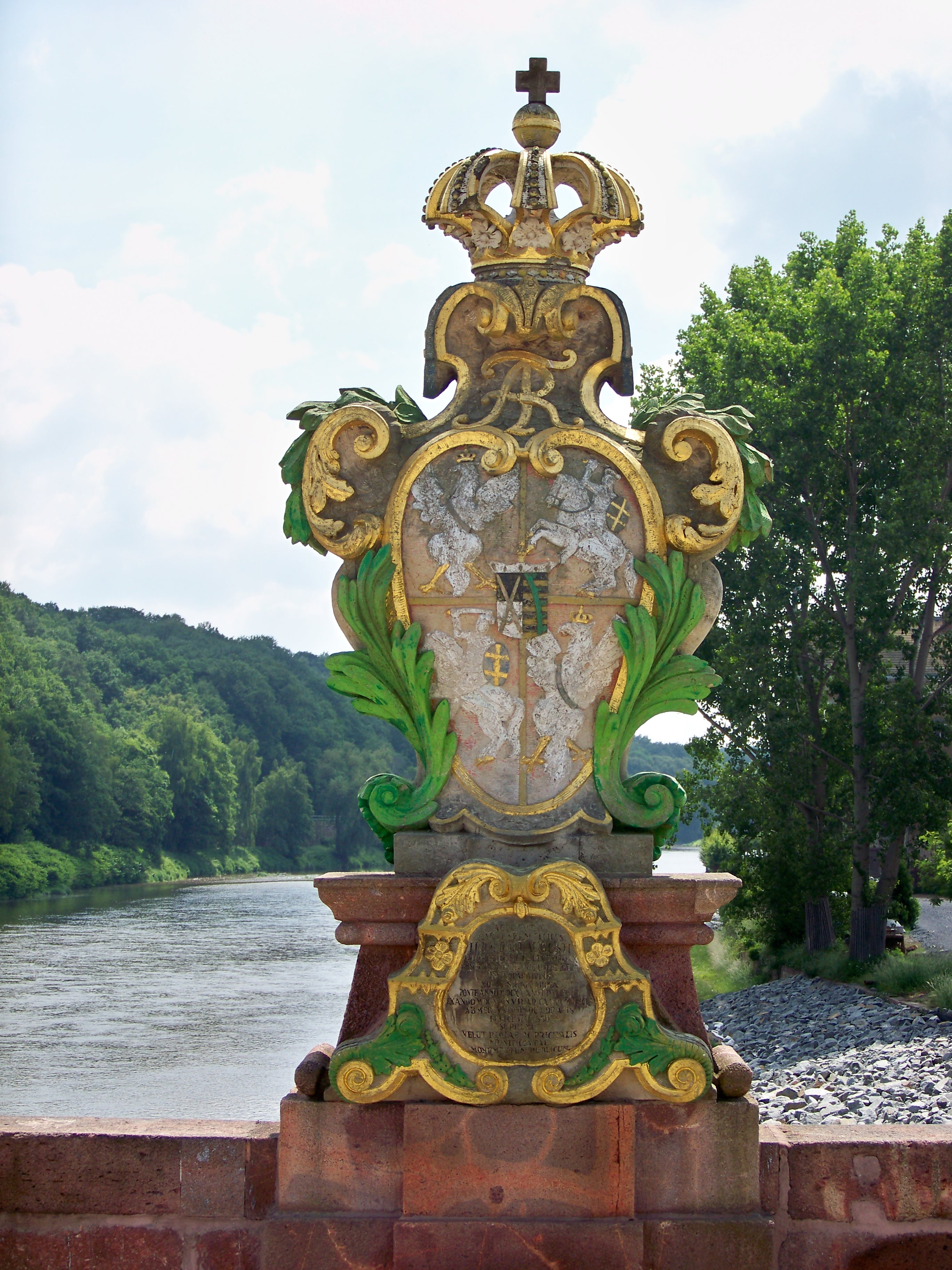
Bridge over Mulde, Grimma, 18th century

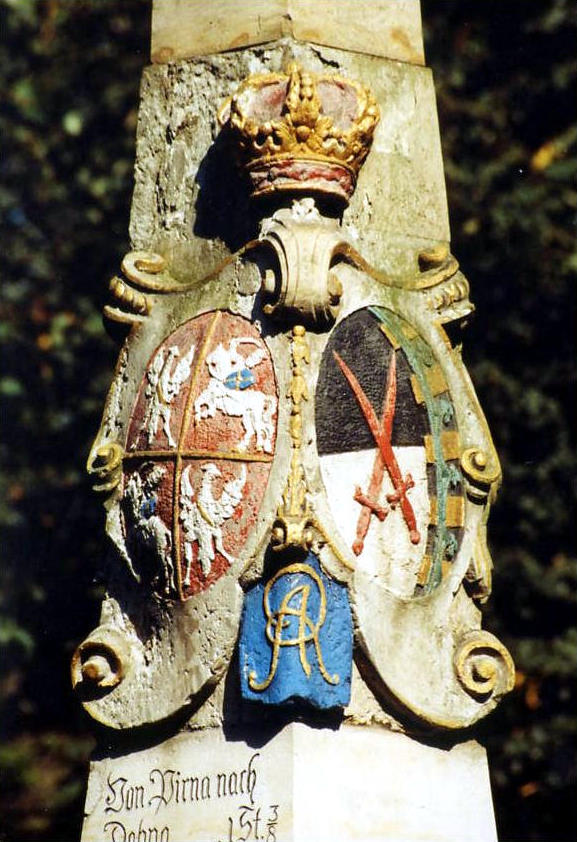
Post milestone, Pirna, 1722

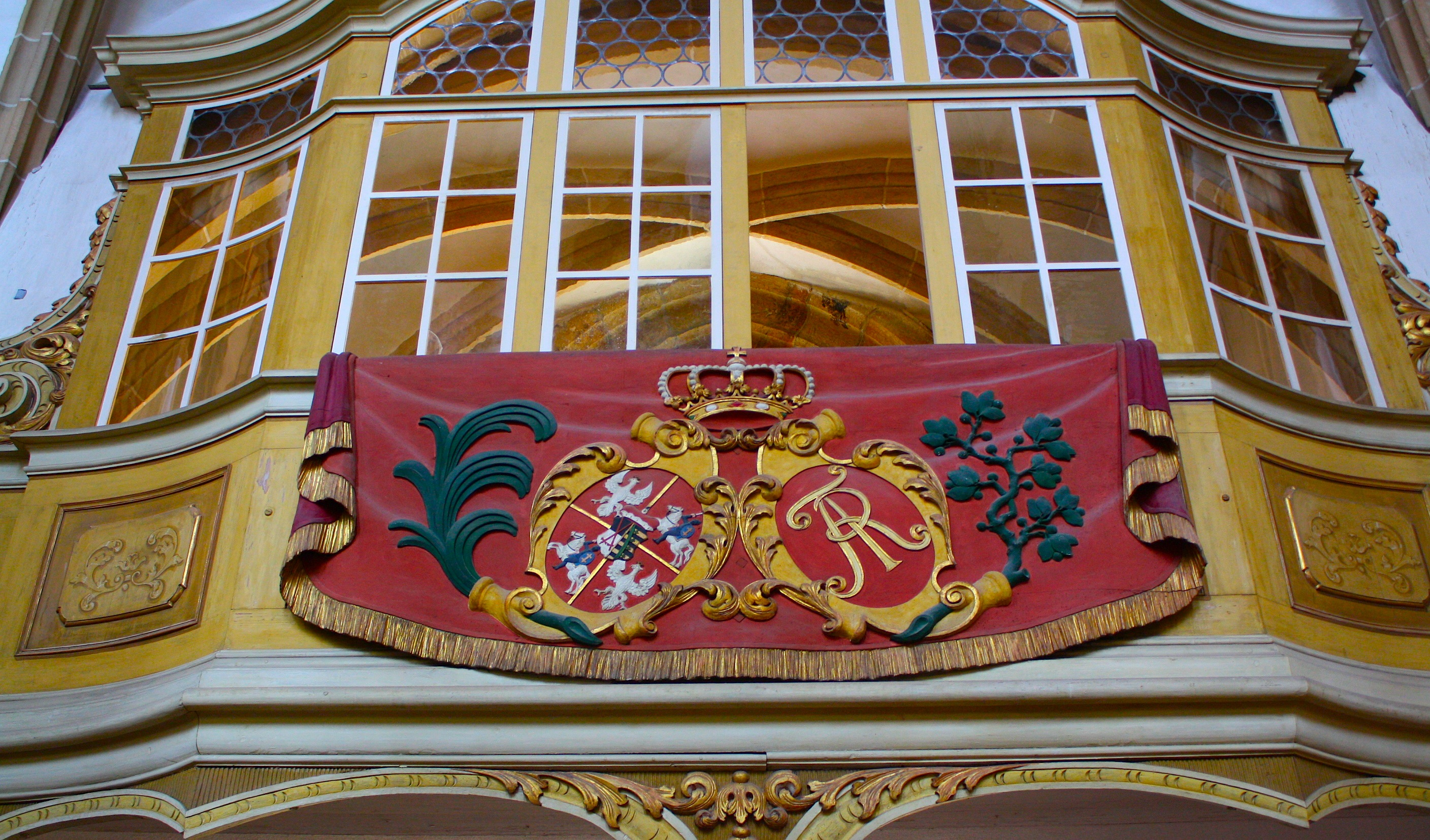
Freiberg Cathedral, Freiberg, 18th century

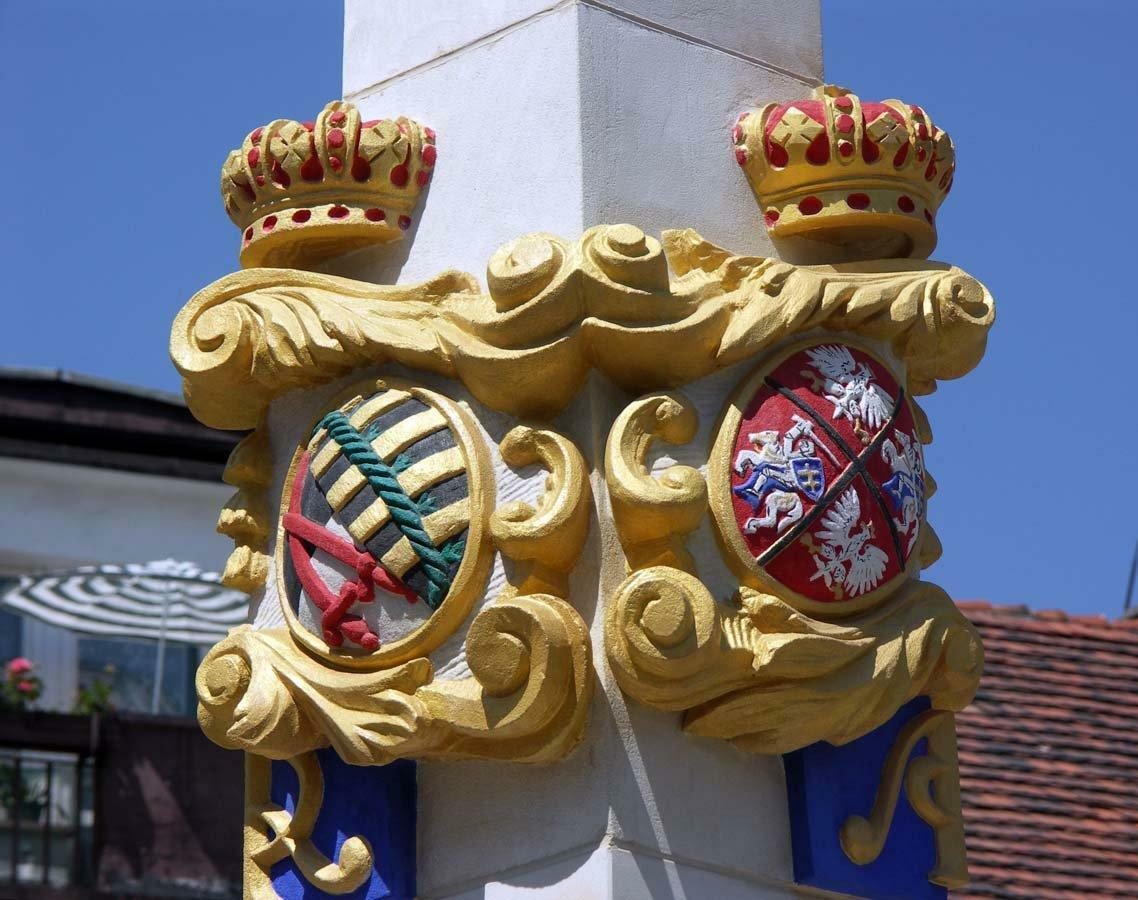
Post milestone, Lubań, 1725

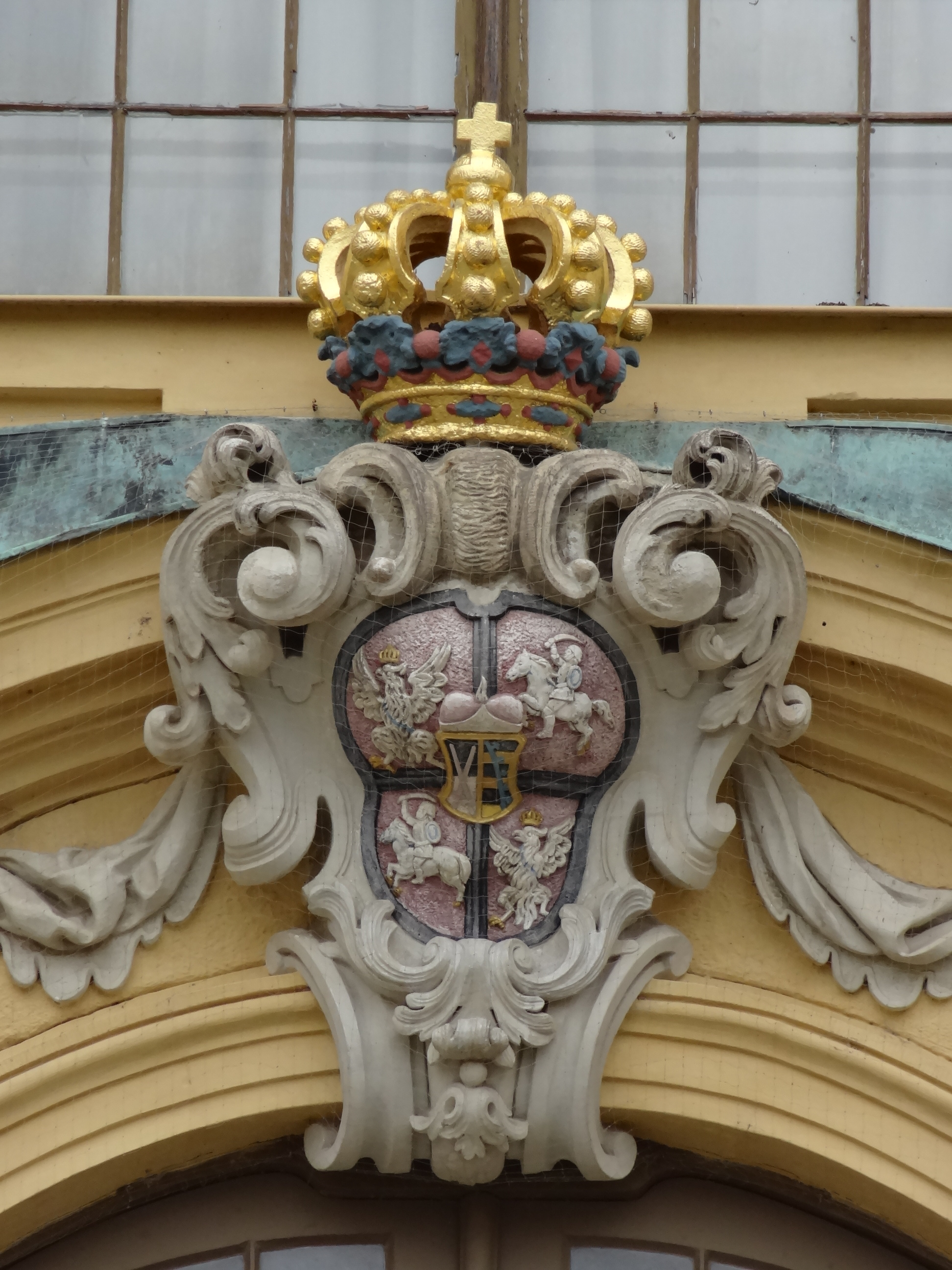
Moritzburg Castle, Moritzburg, 18th century

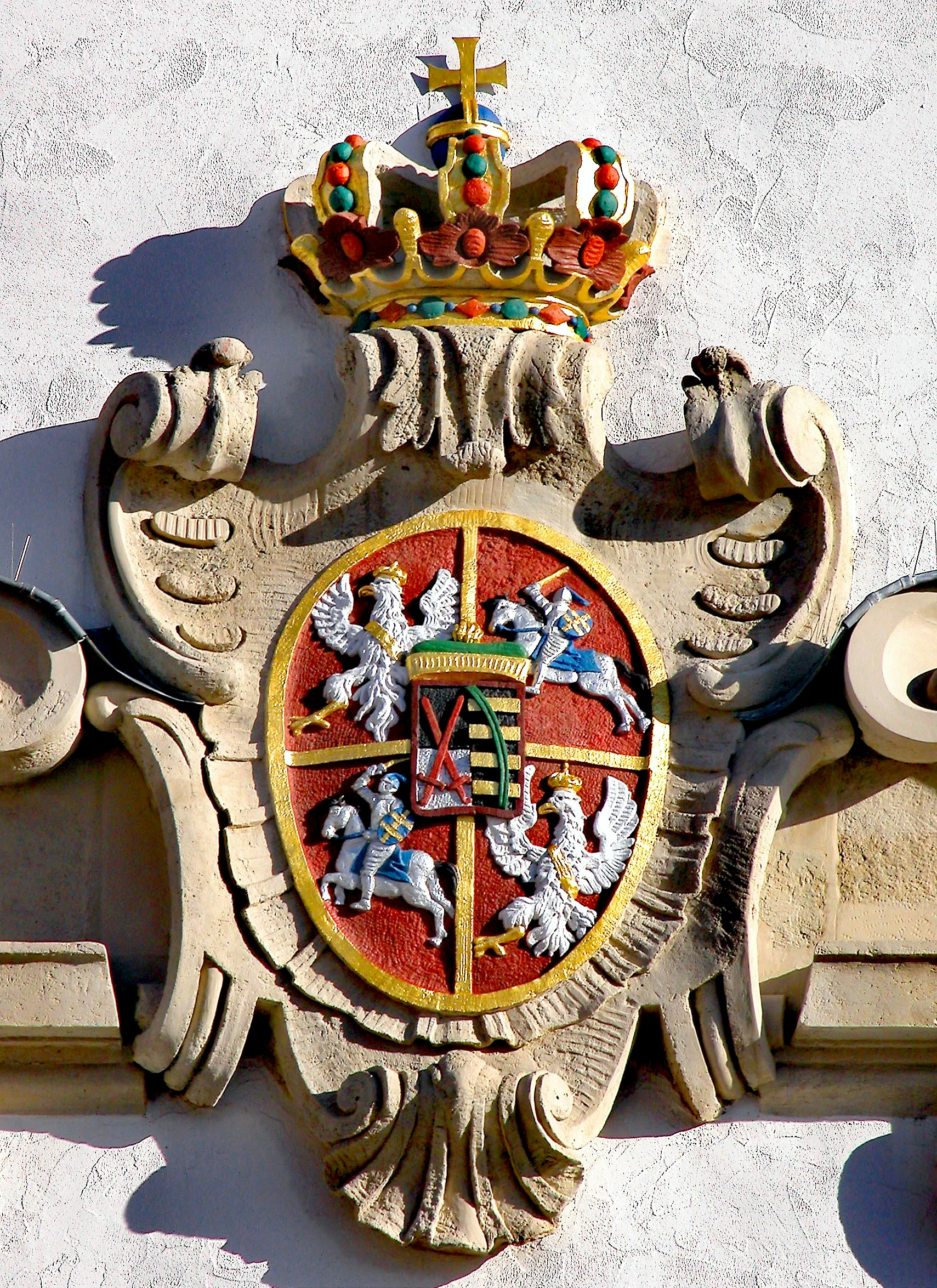
Town hall, Wilsdruff, 18th century

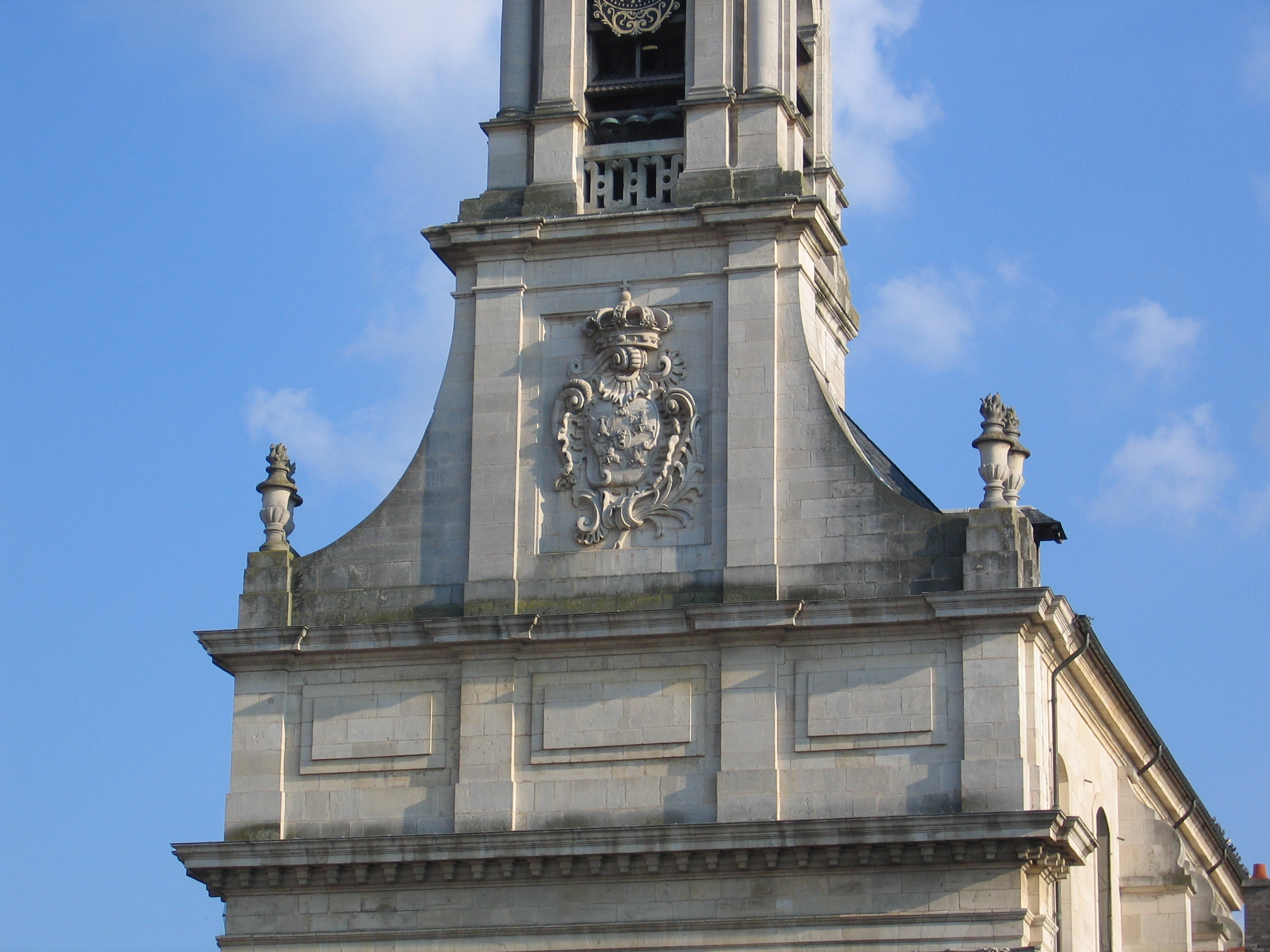
Catholic church, Nancy, 18th century

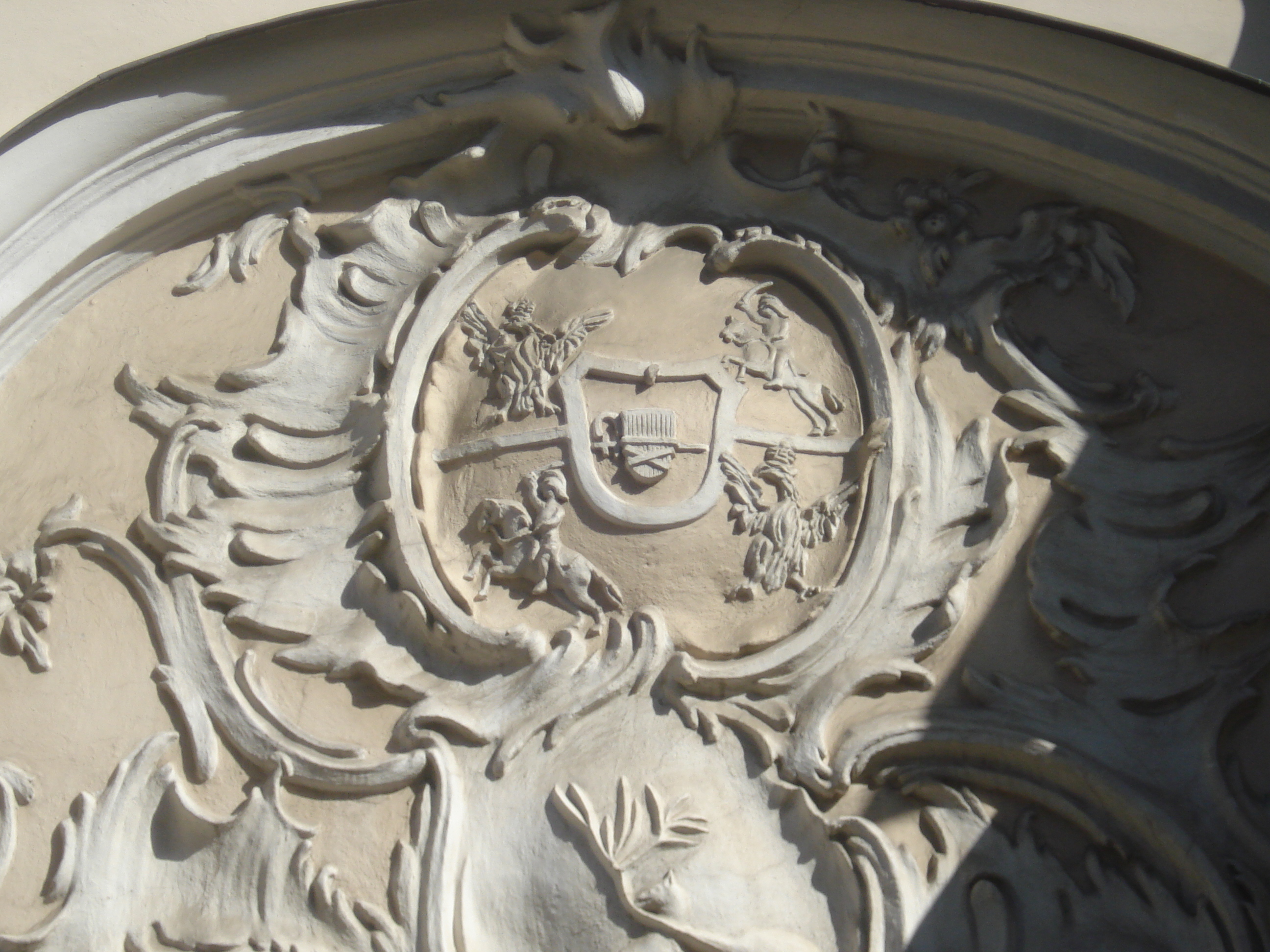
Church of the Holy Spirit, Vilnius, 18th century

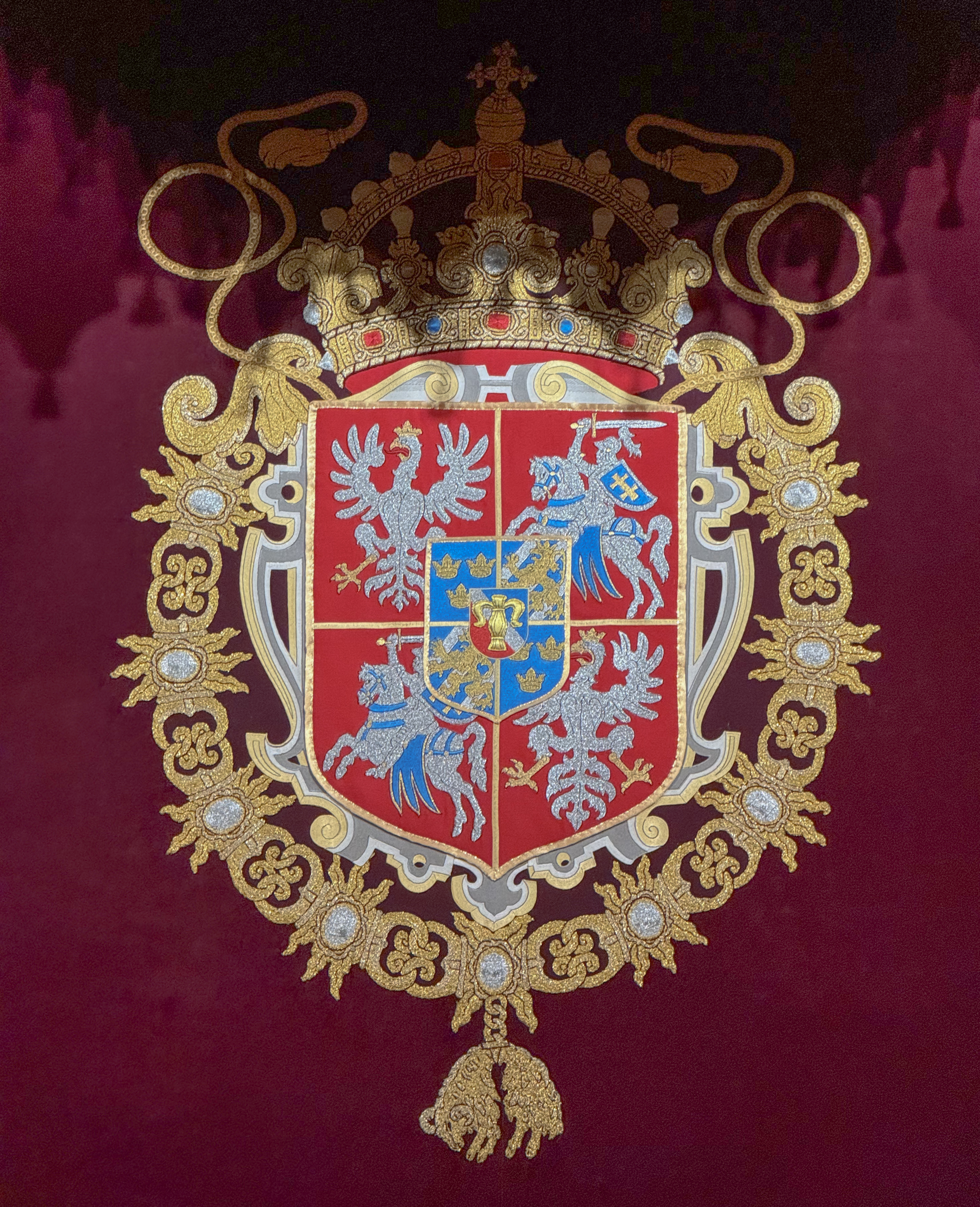
Palace of the Grand Dukes of Lithuania, Vilnius, restored in late 2010s

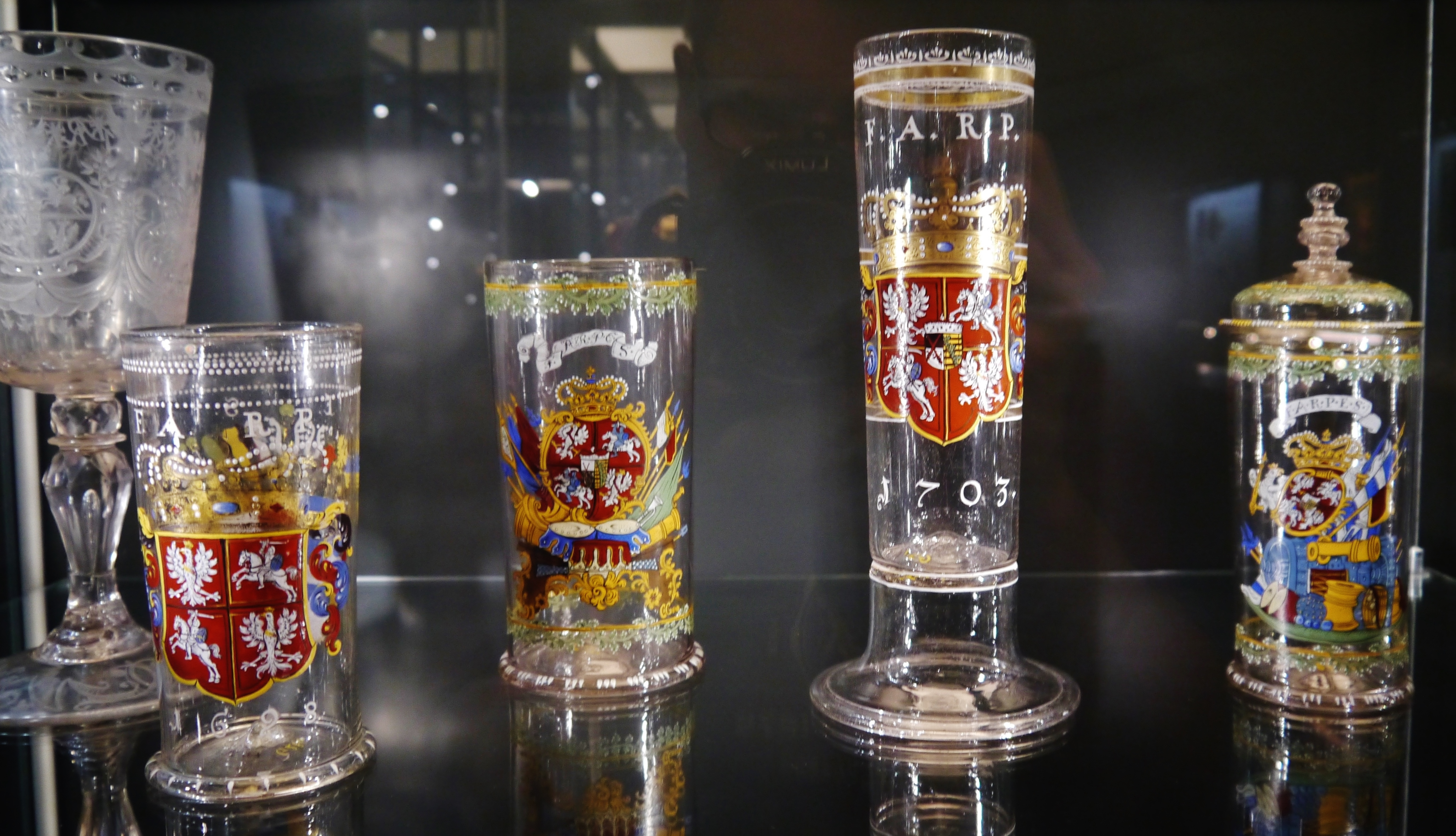
Palace of the Grand Dukes of Lithuania, Vilnius

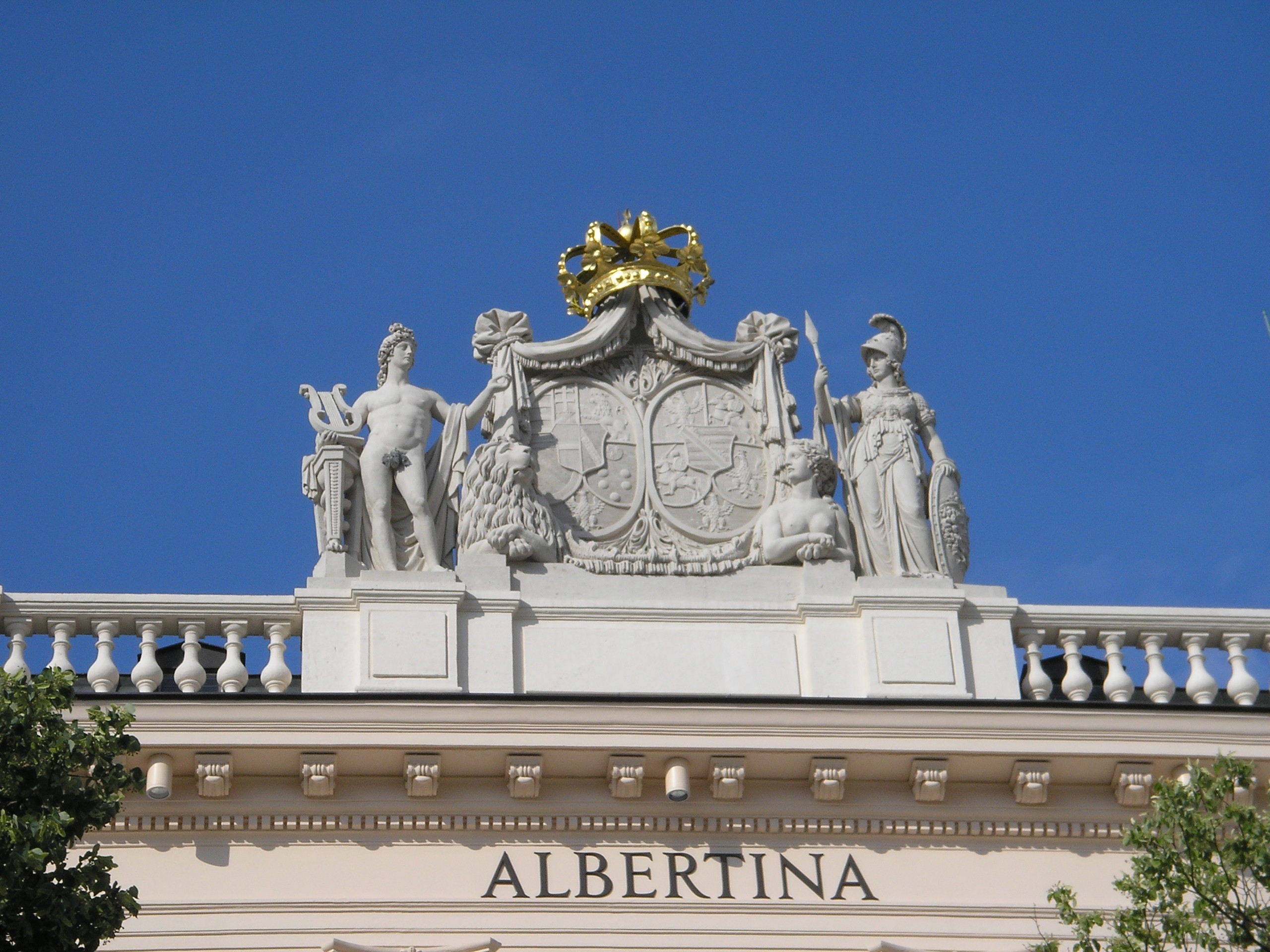
Albertina, Vienna, 18th century

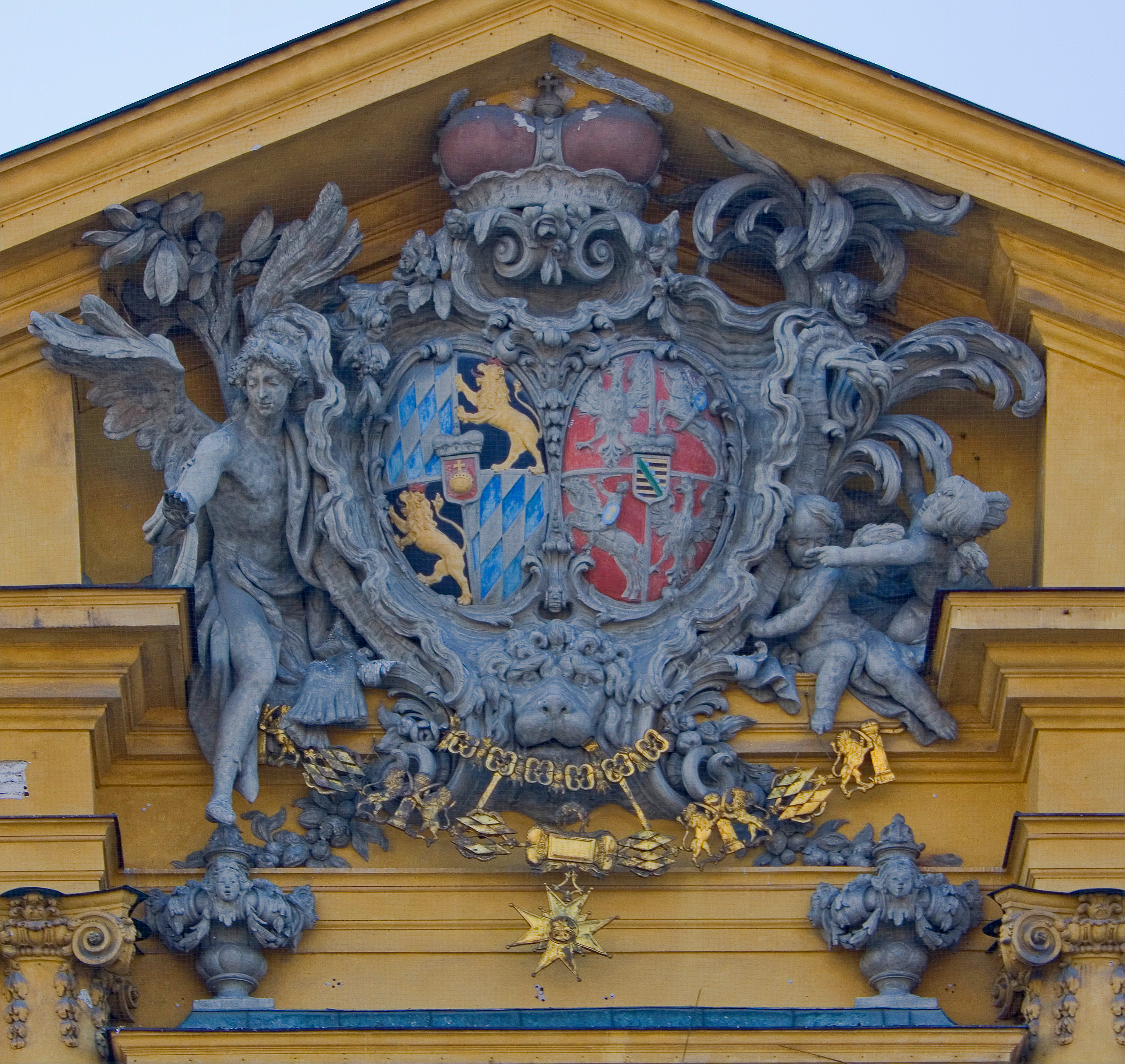
Theatine Church, Munich, 18th century

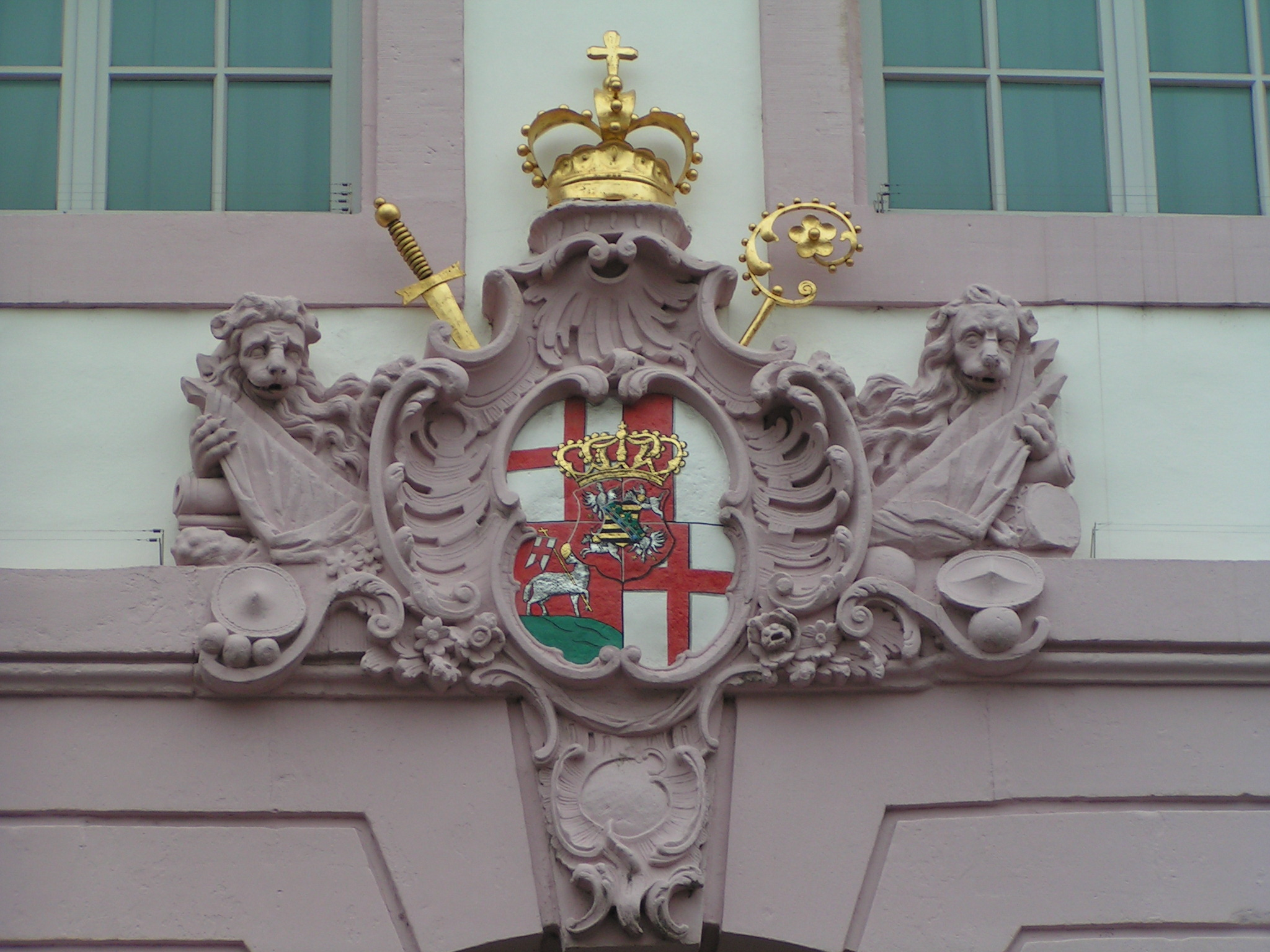
Walderdorff Palace, Trier, 18th century

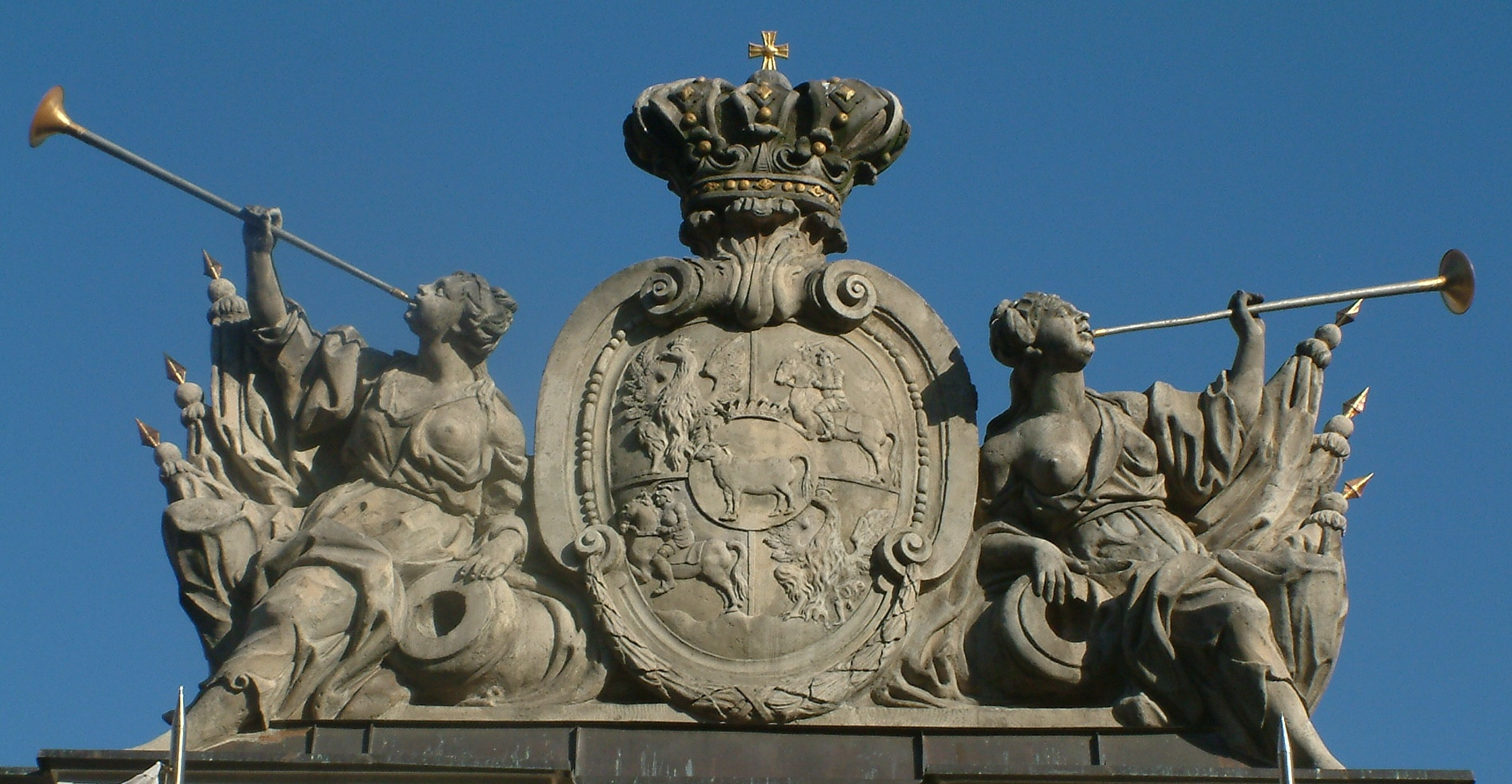
Guardhouse, Poznań, 1780s

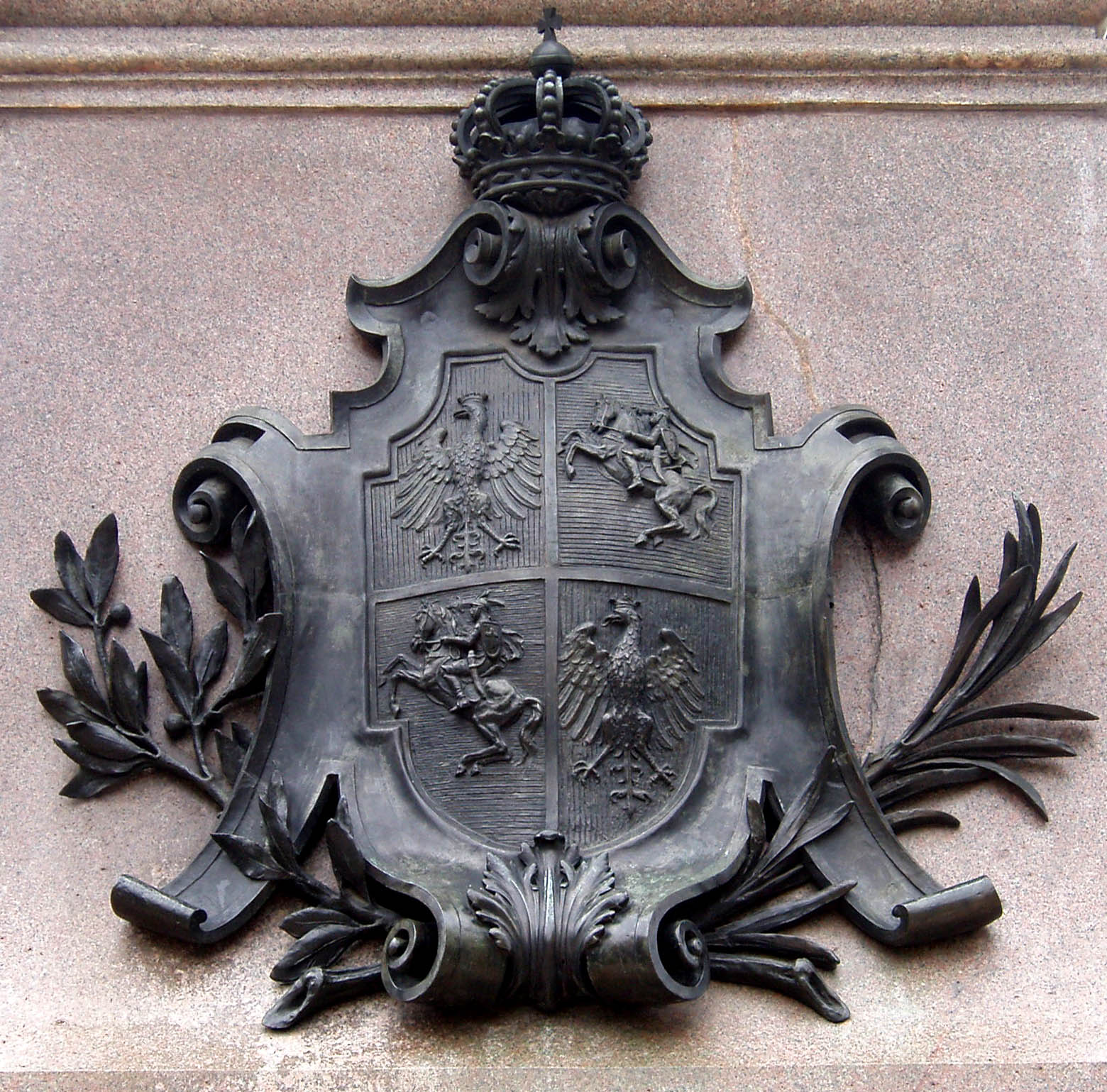
Adam Mickiewicz Monument, Lviv, 1904

== See also ==
- Polish heraldry
- Banner of Poland § Polish–Lithuanian union
- Coat of arms of Lithuania
- Coat of arms of Poland
