= Teutsch =

Teutsch is a surname, a variant of "Deutsch". Notable people with the surname include:

- David Teutsch, American rabbi, professor, and author
- Delores Teutsch
- Georg Daniel Teutsch
- János Mattis-Teutsch
- The namesake of Josef B. Teutsch House
