= Flag and coat of arms of Transylvania =

Symbols of Transylvania

Flag of Transylvania
- Use: Civil flag
- Adopted: 2 November 1765
- Design: A horizontal tricolor of blue, red and yellow with the coat of arms
- Design: A horizontal tricolor of blue, red and yellow

Coat of arms of Transylvania
- Armiger: Grand Principality of Transylvania
- Adopted: 2 November 1765
- Shield: Per fess Azure and Or, a fess Gules between in chief an eagle issuant from the division Sable flanked by a sun-in-splendour Or and an increscent Argent, and in base seven towers Gules.
- Earlier version: Transylvanian Principality (after ca. 1580)
- Use: No current official status on its own; marshalled into the official coat of arms of Romania

The flag and coat of arms of Transylvania were granted by Maria Theresa in 1765, when she established a Grand Principality within the Habsburg monarchy. While neither symbol has official status in present-day Romania, the coat of arms is marshalled within the national Romanian arms; it was also for decades a component of the Hungarian arms. In its upper half, it prominently includes the eagle, which may have been one of the oldest regional symbols, or is otherwise a localized version of the Polish eagle (with one invented tradition from the 19th century identifying it as a version of the Turul bird). Early versions of the Transylvanian charges were first designed in Habsburg Hungary at some point before 1550, and were therefore symbols of pretence.

The arms were only attested as in use by the Transylvanian Principality in or after 1580. The first Prince to recognize and use them was Sigismund Báthory, who also simplified the charges. They entered the heraldic patrimony over the next few decades, and, during Ákos Barcsay's reign, were codified as representing three separate jurisdictions: the eagle stood for Transylvania-proper, the sun-and-crescent is for Székely Land (as in the coat of arms of the Székelys), while the seven towers are canting arms of the Saxon-populated cities. They are also widely understood as ethnic symbols of the three privileged nations (therefore excluding Romanians), but this interpretation is criticized as inaccurate by various historians.

Before Maria Theresa, Transylvania's rulers used a variety of flags, which more often than not included family or factional symbols, such as the Báthory "wolf teeth"; Prince Sigismund also used a prototype of the Hungarian tricolor, but the practice died out long before the Habsburg conquest. Transylvania's Habsburg tricolor and the flag of Romania resemble each other superficially: Transylvania has blue-red-yellow displayed horizontally, while Romania has blue-yellow-red, vertically. The Transylvanian colors were codified from the heraldic tinctures, but Romanian scholars such as Iosif Sterca-Șuluțiu ascribe them a Dacian origin and links to the Romanian ethnogenesis. They became popular among the Romanian community of Transylvania in the later stages of the 1848 Revolution, after replacing combinations of blue, red and white.

On such grounds, Transylvanian flags were often used in Austria-Hungary to camouflage celebrations of Romanian nationalism, and as such contributed to a simmering Hungarian–Romanian conflict before and during World War I. In this context, references to the "Transylvanian tricolor" often referred to a blue-yellow-red horizontal variation. Saxon organizations have traditionally reduced the tricolor to a blue-over-red or red-over-blue arrangement, which was also disliked by Hungarian authorities. Both sets of flags were flown by communities supporting the 1918 union with Romania; in its aftermath, Transylvanian or Tranylvanian-derived symbols were sometimes used by Hungarians seeking autonomy for the region as a whole. In parallel, pro-autonomy activists in Székely Land have adopted a blue-gold-silver pattern.

== History ==
=== Origins ===
Coat of arms in the 16th century, as depicted in Cod. icon. 391

Some of the earliest heraldic traditions in Transylvania relate to the 12th and 13th centuries—which is after the age of Hungarian conquest. They refer to the conquest's chronicling in the manuscript known as Gesta Hungarorum, which claims that Transylvania was settled by five Hungarian clans. Subsequent tradition codified their family crests, all of which had totem-like animal figures—Agmánd had a wolf's head; Borsa, a fish, Gyerő, a fish; Kalocsa, a bird; and Zsombor, a lion. The region had a distinct jurisdiction under a Voivode of Transylvania, the first of whom were attested in the 12th century. Whether it used a heraldic symbol at this stage is a matter of dispute among modern heraldists. Dan Cernovodeanu dismisses the notion, arguing that there was a general uninterest in regional heraldry, manifested throughout high-medieval Hungary; similarly, Károly Kisteleki argues that: "Transylvania did not have an independent coat of arms in the pre-1526 medieval Hungarian Kingdom." Historian Zsigmond Jakó argues that, since "the voivode received his commission directly from the king, [he] probably received a flag from the ruler, as proof of his appointment before an illiterate society."

The Book of Knowledge of All Kingdoms claims a "green flag with a red scimitar" as standing for the "Kingdom of Siluana" or "Septem Castra". The latter is a reference to Transylvania as the country of "seven cities". According to historian Iulian Marțian, this name may predate Hungarian conquest, and is traceable to Roman Dacia. He argues that seven towers may have already been a Transylvanian symbol at that stage, noting that the "Dacian" metropolis of Sirmium was represented by a tower on a field of gules. Hungarian sources, analyzed in the 19th century by Josef Bedeus von Scharberg and Nicolae Densușianu, suggest that Transylvanian troops fought under an eagle banner, but the accuracy of such reporting is altogether doubtful. Several 15th-century armorials also feature a "Duke of Weydn" or "Weiden", which may refer to the Transylvanian Voivodes or Dukes, using an eagle on a field of argent and azure. Among the modern experts, Tudor-Radu Tiron argues for the existence of a Transylvanian eagle shield, taking as evidence a Black Church relief and the attested seal of Fehér County. Both, he argues, may be "heraldizations" of the Roman aquila, and as such folk symbols of "Dacia". At this earliest stage, individual Voivodes also had their own attested arms. Thomas Szécsényi, who governed in the 1350s, used a lion combined with the Árpád stripes. One theory proposes that Bartholomew Drágffy, rising to the position in the 1490s, used the aurochs head, which was also a staple of Moldavian heraldry.

The right to use individual coat of arms was severely limited by the codes of István Werbőczy, introduced in 1514. These effectively excluded many Vlachs (Romanians) from the ranks of Hungarian nobility. In tandem, some alternative collective symbols were being introduced within two distinct ethnic communities: the Transylvanian Saxons (German-speaking) and the Székely (Hungarian-speaking). The former group had its "one single seal" as early as 1224, though it is not recorded what that symbol was. According to Marțian, its design was the same as a 1302 seal, which depicts three kneeling men and a standing one holding up a crown. It was replaced in 1370 by a variant combining the Hungarian and Capetian arms of Louis I. Also included was a third shield, which is as either an eagle-and-rose composition or the first appearance of "three leaves", joined in triquetra, as the leading symbol of the Saxons at large. According to historian Jean-Paul Van der Elst, they are possibly water-lily leaves, establishing a connection with the heraldic traditions of the Low Countries. A tradition reported in 1896 by lawyer Vilmos Bruckner held that a Saxon flag and seal from 1222 carried the slogan AD RETINENDAM CORONAM ("To protect the Crown", in Medieval Latin). The latter's earliest documented usage is on the 1302 seal.

The original Székely symbol featured an arm holding a sword, often piercing through a crown, a bear's severed head, and a heart, sometimes alongside a star-and-crescent; the field, though often interpreted as azure, was most likely gules. Threatened by the peasant revolt of 1437, the estates of the realm established a regime of feudal privileges known as Unio Trium Nationum. This event is traditionally held as the source of a new Székely coat of arms, which only shows the sun and waxing moon (see Count of the Székelys). Marțian notes that these two devices were also used in medieval armorials as visual representations of Cumania and of the Vlachs.

The Ottoman Empire eventually took hold of central Hungary in 1541, leaving Transylvania to reestablish itself as a rump Hungarian Kingdom. During the first decades of reorganization under John Sigismund Zápolya, the region effectively used Hungary's arms, although one popular legend attributes the creation of Transylvania's arms to the same Zápolya. Zápolya's military ordinances imposed recruitment rules on the counties of Transylvania, specifying that each county would have its own banner. Meanwhile, a rival claim to Transylvania had been placed by Habsburg Hungary, which was part of the larger Habsburg monarchy and thus dynastically attached to the Holy Roman Empire. A Transylvanian symbol was probably designed at the court of Ferdinand I, and was based on Saxon heraldry, showing crossed swords and a triquetra. This is the version published by Georg Reicherstorffer (1550) and Martin Schrot (1581).

A manuscript at the Bavarian State Library (Cod. icon. 391) preserves what is perhaps the first version of the modern Transylvanian arms—designed under Habsburg influence, and probably dating back to Zápolya's reign. It has a crowned eagle's head in chief, and seven towers, gules, on seven hills, vert, over a argent field. Its design may join the earlier eagle flag with canting arms for Siebenbürgen ("Seven Cities", the German name of Transylvania); the color scheme seems to be purposefully based on the Hungarian arms. In the 1560s, the seven towers were featured on coinage issued by Habsburg client Iacob Heraclid, who became Prince of Moldavia. These artifacts also feature the Moldavian aurochs and the Wallachian bird, showing Heraclid's ambition of unifying the three realms under one crown. In 1596, Levinus Hulsius of Nuremberg published another recognizable version of Transylvania's arms, showing a crowned eagle over seven hills, with each hill topped by a tower; tinctures cannot be reconstructed.

Attributed flag of the "Kingdom of Siluana" in the Book of Knowledge of All Kingdoms

"Duke of Weiden" arms, possibly representing the Voivode of Transylvania (1438 version)

Saxon arms of Hermannstadt (before 1470); colors are hypothetical

Banner of the Székelys, ca. 1500

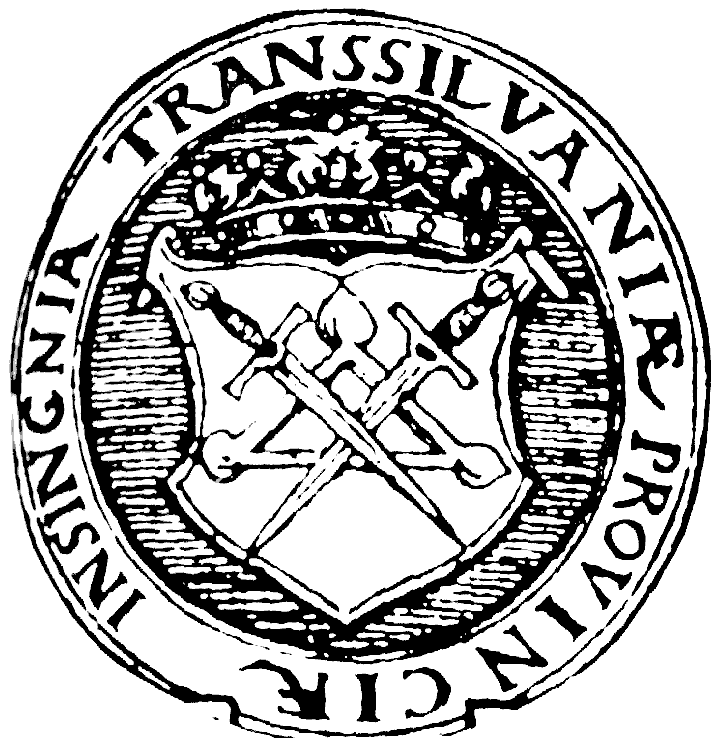
Seal of Transylvania with swords and triquetra (Georg Reicherstorffer variant, 1550)

=== Báthorys and Michael the Brave ===
The Eastern Kingdom was downgraded by its Ottoman suzerains to a Transylvanian Principality in 1570. Like with other Ottoman clients, the new Princes were granted banners-of-rule by the Sublime Porte; these were paraded in ceremonies, alongside the kaftans and scepters. Transylvania also preserved the Zápolyan practice of organizing military units under separate county banners. In heraldic practice, it perpetuated the use of Hungarian royal diadems. Their mantling was gules–argent and or–azure, which were probably remnants of the Croatian and Dalmatian tinctures. Zápolya's former realm was taken over by Stephen Báthory in 1576. Though he was the first to emphasize his princely title, he did not create any heraldic symbol for the region, and instead introduced the Báthory family arms (three "wolf's teeth") as a stand-in. Serving as regent in 1580, Christopher Báthory may have issued a heraldic medal showing an eagle and seven towers alongside the Székely sun and waxing moon, but this may be a forgery.

Stephen's son, Sigismund Báthory, rejected Ottoman rule and joined the Habsburgs in the Holy League, being recognized as a Reichsfürst in 1595. By January 1596, he had ambitions to expand his realm, and his Transylvanian troops, stationed in Moldavia, used a flag inscribed Sigismundus Rex Ungariae ("Sigismund King of Hungary"). His elevation in status allowed him to marshall the Báthory and Hulsius versions into a single coat of arms, which also included the Moldavian aurochs and the Wallachian eagle, reflecting Báthory's claim to suzerainty over both countries. No colored versions of the seal survive. While tinctures have been deduced by the authors of Siebmachers Wappenbuch during the 1890s, and are described by historian Constantin Moisil as sable devices on azure (for the eagle) and or (for the seven towers), such readings are criticized by Cernovodeanu—as he notes, the seal's hatching preceded modern conventions, and therefore could not be properly reconstructed. A relief of the Transylvanian arms was carved, probably on Sigismund's orders, in the Moldavian capital of Suceava, again highlighting his regional dominance. This variant kept only the seven towers, and replaced the eagle with an "imperial crown" supported by two lions. Sigismund's heraldry standardizes the towers' depiction by removing the corresponding hills. It, therefore, became the basic template for more modern subsequent representations, being also the first one to definitely include the Székely sun-and-moon.

The latter innovation is often described as fulfilling the visual representation of the Unio Trium Nationum, with the implicit omission of Transylvania's Romanians. In this reading, the eagle represents Hungarian nobility and the towers are a stand-in for the Saxon cities. According to historian Szabolcs de Vajay, neither of these symbols preexisted the 1590s but were appropriated by their armigers after first appearing on Sigismund's seal. Similarly, Marțian argues that the Saxons circulated an invented tradition about the origins of the seven towers as an ethnic symbol, backdating them to the 13th century. Joseph Bedeus von Scharberg and other researchers propose that the eagle is from the coat of arms of Poland, hinting to Stephen Báthory's rule as King of Poland. The bird had special significance for the superstitious Sigismund, who credited his victories in Wallachia to ornithomancy; in similar vein, he used an alternative coat of arms depicting three suns, which apparently referred to his witnessing a sun dog.

In 1599, following defeat at Șelimbăr, the Báthorys were ousted from Transylvania by Wallachian Prince Michael the Brave, who later also extended his control into Moldavia. During his interval in power, Michael issued documents bearing new seals, which included both Wallachian and Moldavian symbols; also featured were two lions rampant. Romanian scholars are in disagreement as to whether the latter symbol is meant to represent Transylvania. While Grigore Tocilescu, Dimitrie Onciul and Paul Gore have supported the notion, others, including Moisil and Ioan C. Filitti, have cast "serious doubts", and see the lions as Michael's personal emblem. Cernovodeanu proposes that the lions could represent Transylvania indirectly, as "Dacia", noting similar descriptions of "Dacian arms" in the works of Nicolae Costin and Pavao Ritter Vitezović.

In November 1599, Michael ordered new military flags to be made by the Hungarian tailor János Thamásfalvi. Flags captured by Michael and his Habsburg ally Giorgio Basta during the Battle of Guruslău, some of which are also depicted in paintings by Hans von Aachen, give additional insight into the Principality's heraldic symbolism. Samples include blue and white Székely flags displaying the old and new symbols together. A variety of Báthory flags were captured on the field of battle, prominently displaying the "wolf's teeth", but with no element from the coat of arms. As noted in 1910 by historian Iosif Sterca-Șuluțiu, "they are of all sort of colors and shapes, none of which have any significance." According to researcher Constantin Rezachevici, the white variant in Aachen's painting (displaying what Rezachevici identifies as "elephant tusks") was the inspiration for Michael the Brave's own flag of Wallachia.

Levinus Hulsius version of 1596

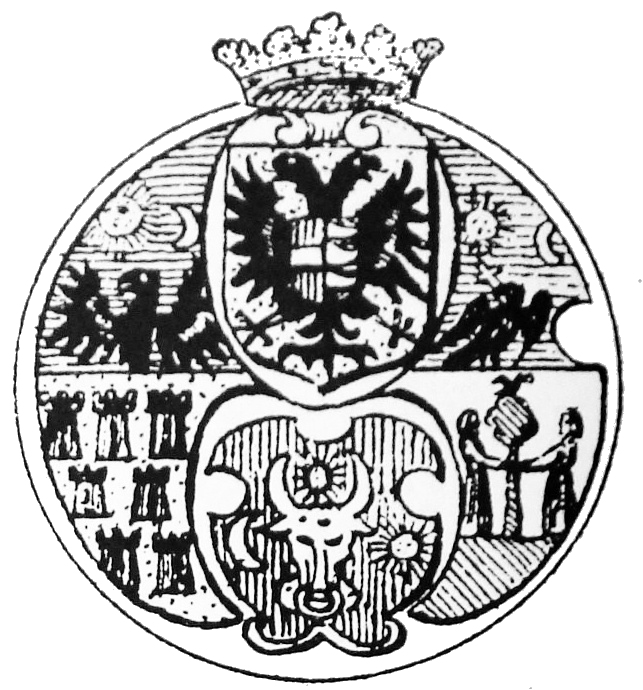
Sigismund Báthory's composite arms

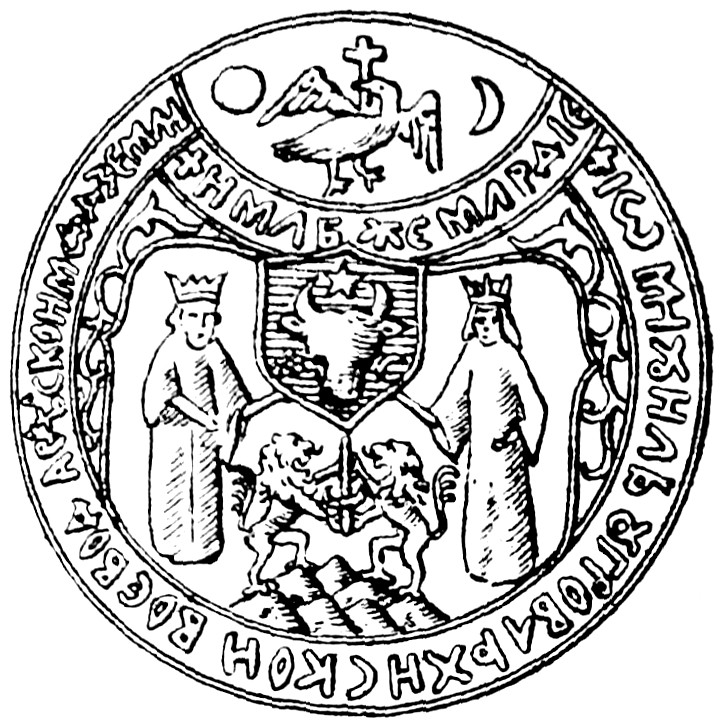
Seal used by Michael the Brave, featuring the two lions

"Wolf's teeth" banner, captured in the Battle of Guruslău

"Wolf's teeth" badge from a 1645 map

=== 17th-century variants ===
Gabriel Bethlen's banner

In 1601, at the beginning of his third and final reign in Transylvania, Prince Sigismund received from his overlord Mehmed III a red-white-green flag which superficially resembled the modern Hungarian tricolor. Scholar Péter Váczy notes that, overall, this "decidedly Hungarian" color scheme was more often embraced by Hungarians in Habsburg-held territories, including Hussars who attempted to take Transylvania in 1611; these had "20 red-white-green silk flags". By contrast: "The princes of Transylvania had their own flags, which were almost always monochrome, with their own coat of arms and that of the country."

One of Michael's allies and rivals, Moses Székely, briefly took the throne of Transylvania in 1603. His seals included a representation of the lions rampant, but there is disagreement as to whether these alluded to Michael's heraldry or to Moses' own family arms. Taking over as Prince in 1605, Stephen Bocskai removed the lions and briefly restored the seven mountains, also changing the overall arrangement. Bocskai was also the first Transylvanian Prince to include the state arms on coinage, featuring them alongside his family arms or those of the Zápolyan monarchy; all three symbols appeared on flags carried separately during his funeral procession in 1607. His successor Sigismund Rákóczi used a different design for the eagle which, according to historians such as Bedeus and Marțian, was actually a revival of the Polish arms; Moisil sees it as a borrowing from the Prince's personal arms. At that stage, a Transylvanian eagle was used on coinage issued by the Saxon city of Kronstadt (Brașov), which had risen in rebellion against Rákóczi.

Before 1621, anti-Habsburg Prince Gabriel Bethlen incorporated his claim to the Lands of the Hungarian Crown by depicting Hungary and Transylvania's arms on a single shield. His crimson swallowtail, reuniting the Bethlen family arms and Transylvanian symbols (black eagle, seven red towers on gold etc.), was preserved and reproduced in later centuries. Another red flag, which survives only through two contemporary engravings, references Bethlen's status as a defender of the Protestant faith, and was as such carried in battle by Imre Thurzó and his Hungarian–Transylvanian troops in the Thirty Years' War. It depicts a "Turkish warship" and the Lamb of God alongside Latin poetry and slogans; in one version, these include the motto CONSILIO FIRMATA DEI ("It is settled by God's decree"), which also features on Bethlen's Transylvanian coinage, alongside an arm-and-sword emblem. The latter symbol is depicted in portrait engravings of Bethlen, often at the top of the image. The bottom edge reunites the arms of Transylvania, the Bethlen family arms, and somewhat less frequently, those of Hungary as well. Other records suggest that Bethlen used countless flags during his reign, including black-and-purple or red-and-purple flags of mourning in preparation for his own death.

Historian Vencel Bíró argues that in the 1630s, under George I Rákóczi, Transylvania already had a "blue, red, gold-yellow" tricolor as its state flag. This appears in heraldry used by the Transylvanian post riders. George II Rákóczi, whose reign began in 1648, used a vast range of Transylvanian arms, freely mixing the elements and including his family's arms. A portrait of his by John Overton features the three elements as separate shields, with the Székely moon wrongly depicted as a bird's head. From 1637, the regular coat of arms, combined with dynastic symbols, was still used as a watermark by the Rákóczian paper mill of Lámkerék (Lancrăm). Between the reigns of Bethlen and Rákóczi, knowledge about "heraldic art" was spread in Transylvania by writer Ferenc Pápai Páriz, whose book standardized descriptions of both princely families' arms. While this revival saw a surge in the number of arms granted by Transylvanian Princes to their Transylvanian or Moldavian subjects and allies, the arms themselves were seldom depicted, as most recipients could not afford the cost of having them painted.

Various other designs of the state arms, featuring the same basic elements, continued under several Princes until 1659, when Ákos Barcsay restored Sigismund's basic arrangement. This was probably the result of a ruling by the Transylvanian Diet, associating each heraldic element with a distinct entity of Transylvania, and issuing orders for each to be made into a separate seal. A Diet writ also specified the introduction of distinct arms for Partium—an area of Hungary-proper which had been attached to the Principality. This subregion was to be represented by four bars and a Patriarchal cross. Nevertheless, a symbol of Partium never appeared on Barcsay's Transylvanian arms, and the notion was eventually abandoned. As attested in the 1650s by Claes Rålamb, the various towns of this area flew their own symbols, a multitude of "flags and colors".

The 1659 ruling is widely read as the first to explicitly associate each component privileged class, social as well as national. This interpretation is seen as erroneous by various historians: Marțian notes that the bird was not intended as a stand-in for the Hungarian Transylvanians, but for the multinational nobility and the regular, non-autonomous, counties; this verdict is also backed by Attila István Szekeres and Sándor Pál-Antal: the Diet ascribed a primarily geographical meaning to each element, separating between "the counties", represented by the eagle, and the two autonomous enclaves. Moisil also highlights a non-ethnic definition of the "nation" represented by the eagle, but also comments that, by that moment in time, Romanian nobles were being "gradually Magyarized".

=== Habsburg conquest ===
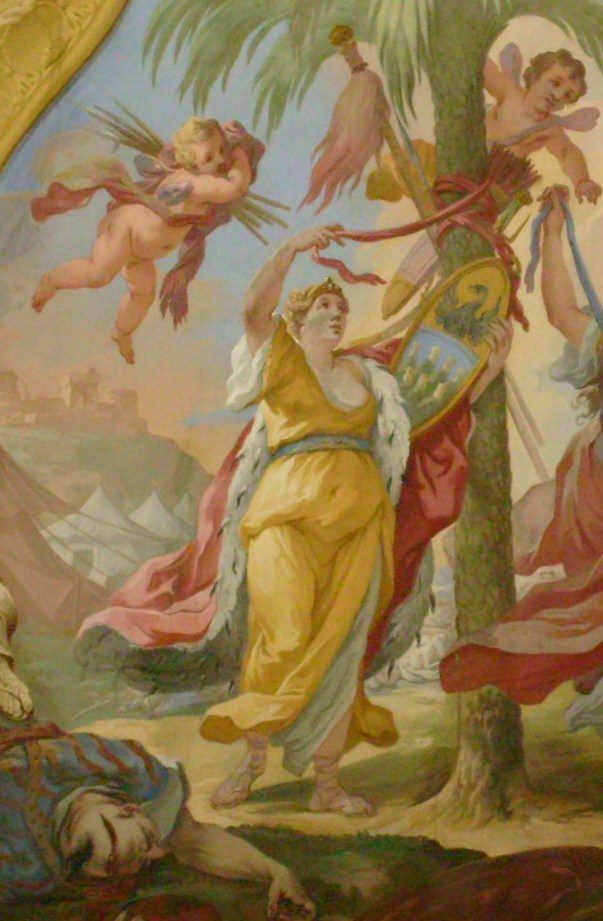
Personification of Transylvania with a heraldic shield; from a 1723 fresco by Bartolomeo Altomonte at St. Florian Monastery. Tinctures not yet standardized before the addition of a gules fess

According to Moisil, the late adoption of a Transylvanian coat of arms, and its "few connections with the past and soul of the Romanian people", meant that the symbolism was rarely evoked in Romanian folk literature—unlike the Moldavian or Wallachian arms. The tower symbolism preserved some popularity in Romanian-inhabited areas outside Transylvania's borders. Shortly before Barcsay's ascendancy, Wallachian intellectual Udriște Năsturel used a heraldic device with gules tower appearing in crest. Researchers see this usage as reflecting a belief that "red towers" stood for Transylvanian cities in general, and for Udriște's claim to descent from the Boyar of Fogaras. Seven towers of presumed Transylvanian origin were also depicted on a stove top, dated to ca. 1700, which was recovered during excavations at the Moldavian court in Huși.

In the 1680s, at the height of the Great Turkish War, Emeric Thököly led a Hungarian–Transylvanian Kuruc army which assisted the Ottomans against the Habsburgs. This force is known to have used two banners: a blue one with an arm-and-sword, and a red one with the Thököly arms. In reaction, Leopold I and his Habsburg court backed Michael II Apafi as a rival claimant to the Transylvanian fiefdom. In June 1686, they formalized an alliance, under terms which specified that: "His Imperial Majesty may never lay claim to either the princely title or the coat of arms [of Transylvania]". Thököly's revolt ultimately failed; Apafi was briefly the Transylvanian Prince. During this time, the mint of Fogaras (Făgăraș) produced ducats, "reserved for the prince's use as gifts", with "the combined arms of Transylvania and the Apafi family". Transylvania and Partium were fully incorporated into the Habsburg realms under the Treaty of Karlowitz (1699). In anticipation, Leopold already used the Transylvanian arms on his large coat of arms, by 1691, and on his coinage, by 1694.

Habsburg Transylvania, which remained a principality attached to the Hungarian Crown, issued polturas with its own markings throughout the early 18th century. These depictions introduced the practice of showing regional arms superimposed on the Reichsadler, something which was also done, with the respective arms, for coins used in Hungary, Milan or Tuscany. In Partium, Leopold also granted nobility to the Romanian peasant families Sida and Iuga in 1701. Their diploma has separate shields of Transylvania, showing the towers on azure and the eagle sable on a barry shield of or and gules. The Partium arms with the Patriarchal cross are also revived for this document, with bars of or and gules.

Transylvanian independence was briefly restored in the War of 1703–1711 by Prince Francis II Rákóczi, who also claimed the Hungarian throne. This episode began in July 1704, when the Diet abolished the instruments of Habsburg rule, including the seal of the Gubernium, which had served as a centralized body of administration. Rákóczi's Kuruc cavalry fought under a seven-bars variant of the Árpád stripes, with the slogan IUSTAM CAUSAM DEUS NON DERELINQUET ("God will not abandon the just cause"). Tradition about Transylvania's coat of arms was preserved in other Hungarian circles: in 1734, Ioannes Szegedi published an engraving of it, showing a crowned eagle, sable, and seven towers, argent, over seven mountains, vert, all on azure background; here, the Székelys were no longer represented by celestial bodies, but by the older arm-and-sword.

The Dictionarium heraldicum, printed at Vienna in 1746, referred to the Transylvanian arms as being: "Seven cities over which shines the moon". Regional symbolism was again in focus during the 1740s, when Maria Theresa took over as Queen and Empress. A medal she issued in 1740 is also the first official one to have readable hatching, with an azure background throughout. The following year, Hristofor Žefarović published a version more closely resembling the Báthory design but replacing the "teeth" with an Austrian badge. Žefarović placed the eagle on a field of or; his towers and mountains were argent and placed on a gules field.

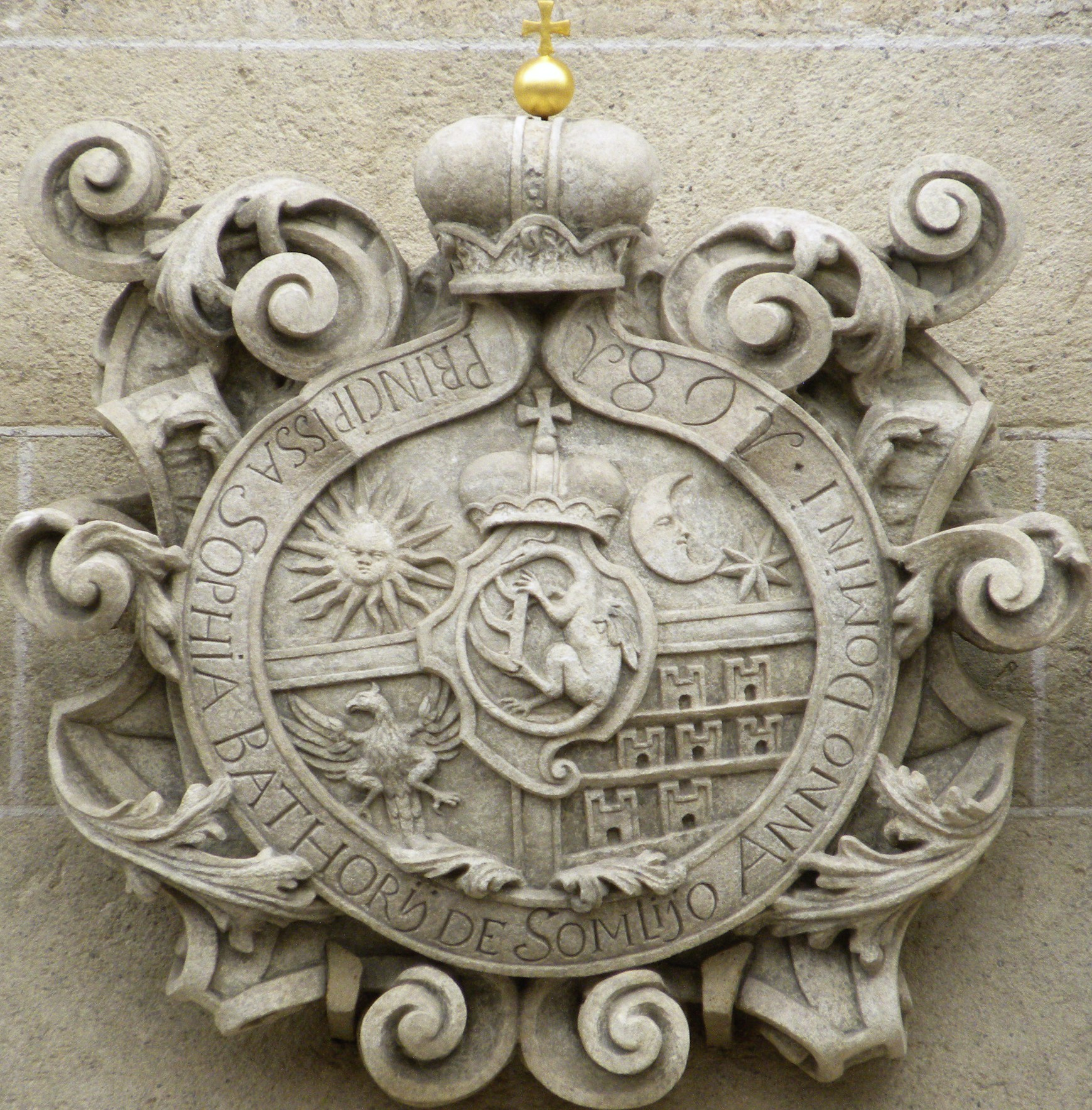
Arms used by Princess-consort Sophia Báthory (1681)

Partium arms, as used in 1701

Francis II Rákóczi's version of the Árpád stripes

Transylvanian arms in Ioannes Szegedi's version (1734)

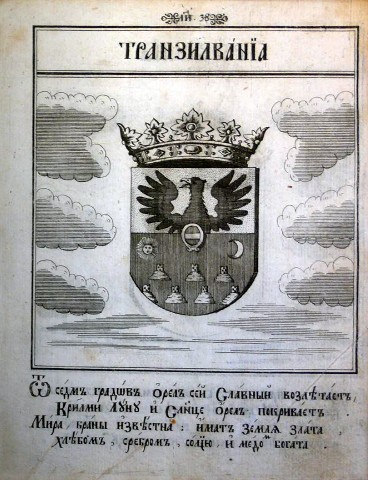
Hristofor Žefarović's version (1741)

=== Standardized symbols ===
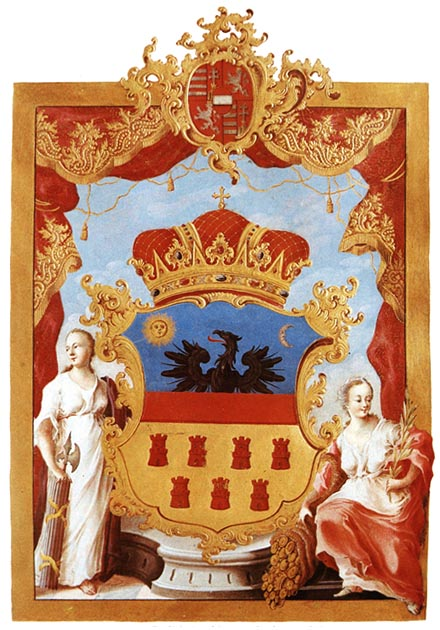
Coat of arms of Transylvania in 1765

Upon creating a "Grand Principality of Transylvania" on 2 November 1765, Maria Theresa finally standardized the coat of arms, introducing the definitive tinctures and adding the gules fess. Following this redesign, the crescent was also rendered as a waning moon. These new Transylvanian arms were also the basis for a Transylvanian blue-red-yellow banner, which may also date back to 1765. Transylvania's promotion and its modernized heraldry were both supervised by Chancellor Wenzel von Kaunitz, who encouraged a rift between Transylvania and the Hungarian Kingdom; on such grounds, Kaunitz rejected heraldic submissions by the Hungarian nobles, who wished to include a Patriarchal cross into the design. In 1769, he shocked his Hungarian adversaries by refusing to add the Transylvanian arms into those of the Kingdom. The arms still appeared on the third great seal used by Maria Theresia, which combined all her "German-Austrian and Hungarian provincial coats of arms" into a design that parted with "old heraldic simplicity and restraint".

In approving of this exclusion and distinction, Maria Theresa noted that interfering with the arms would upset Transylvania's population. By then, Romanians were readily associating with imperial symbolism. Already in 1756, Petru Pavel Aron sponsored an all-Romanian Hussar unit, which flew its own flag in the Seven Years' War. Historians Lizica Papoiu and Dan Căpățînă propose that the definitive selection of azure for the field displaying the eagle was meant to represent Maria Theresa's Romanian subjects, being derived from the Wallachian arms (which, by then, were also standardized as azure). As they note, those Romanian serfs who were raised into Transylvania's nobility also opted for azure shields. In 1762, Adolf Nikolaus von Buccow was entrusted with conscripting Székely and Romanian (or "Dacian") men into the Military Frontier, under a shared Transylvanian coat of arms.

Romanian loyalism remained high as the Székely rebelled (see Siculicidium). A blason included in the 1784 Molitvenic ("Prayer Book") of the Romanian Eastern Catholics focuses attention on the Reichsadler rather than the Transylvanian eagle, expressing solidarity with the "well-beloved", reform-minded, Joseph II. Late that year, during the anti-Hungarian revolt of Romanian peasants, insurgents reportedly carried a flag with Joseph's portrait. Their leader Horea reportedly used an emblem showing a triple cross, either alongside a dagger-pierced heart, or with seven mounds that may evoke the seven cities on the official arms; this arrangement sometimes included a slogan, NOS PRO CESARE, attesting Horea's Habsburg loyalties. In 1791, Romanian intellectuals of the "Transylvanian School" addressed Leopold II an essay demanding increased social rights. Titled Supplex Libellus Valachorum, it was illustrated with an allegory which included the Transylvanian arms. At the same time, Márton Hochmeister was putting out the newspaper Erdélyi Magyar Hírvivő, which fought against Josephinism and Germanization from a Hungarian perspective, and was headlined by the Hungarian arms with the Transylvanian arms inescutcheon.

Joseph II ended Transylvania's separate coinage, including monetary use of the regional arms. Following the consolidation of a Habsburg-ruled Austrian Empire in 1804, Transylvania became one of the crownlands depicted separately from the main arms. On the Hungarian "secret seal" (titkospecsét) of 1804, the Transylvanian arms appear, alongside other provincial arms, in an "arbitrary" arrangement. The imperial arms also came to feature it on the Reichsadler wings; the first such depiction was in 1806. The local flag, meanwhile, was still used in tandem with a multitude of other banners. As reported by historian Auguste de Gérando, in the 1840s Transylvania's chartered towns (oppida nobilia) formed individual units of the Landwehr under their respective county banners. Coins minted in Transylvania no longer had distinguishing heraldic markings after 1780, though Reichsadler-with-arms designs continued to be used by other institutions into the 19th century, including by the salt monopoly in Vizakna (Ocna Sibiului). While the tricolor scheme became a standard in official Habsburg heraldry, nostalgic or ill-informed heraldists continued to use variants without the bar, as with the 1784 Molitvenic. Mapmaker Johann Joseph von Reilly also preferred a three-shield version: the eagle and the Székely sun-and-moon each on gules, and the seven mountains on argent.

In de Gérando's time, the coat of arms was interpreted as an actual visual record of ethnic divisions, omitting the "most populous inhabitants", who were the Romanians, as well as the "tolerated nation" of Armenians. Székely woodcarvers appropriated the coat of arms, which appeared on their wooden gates, though less frequently than the Reichsadler. A unique example is on the 1816 gate at Farcád (Forțeni), where the Transylvanian eagle over seven towers was itself double-headed. One of the two heads was afterwards scratched out, possibly as a political statement. Transylvanian regional symbols, and in particular the chief portion of the crest, were now reclaimed by members of the Hungarian community; the eagle was interpreted a version of the mythical Turul. "The sun, the moon and the eagle" under a "Hungarian sky" were thus referenced in a song by Zsigmond Szentkirályi, dedicated to Governor György Bánffy. It was performed in 1821 at the National Magyar Theater, on a stage bearing a large version of the Transylvanian arms. By contrast, a variant with only towers and two eagles in supporters was used on an 1825 lithograph depicting the Saxon city of Kronstadt.

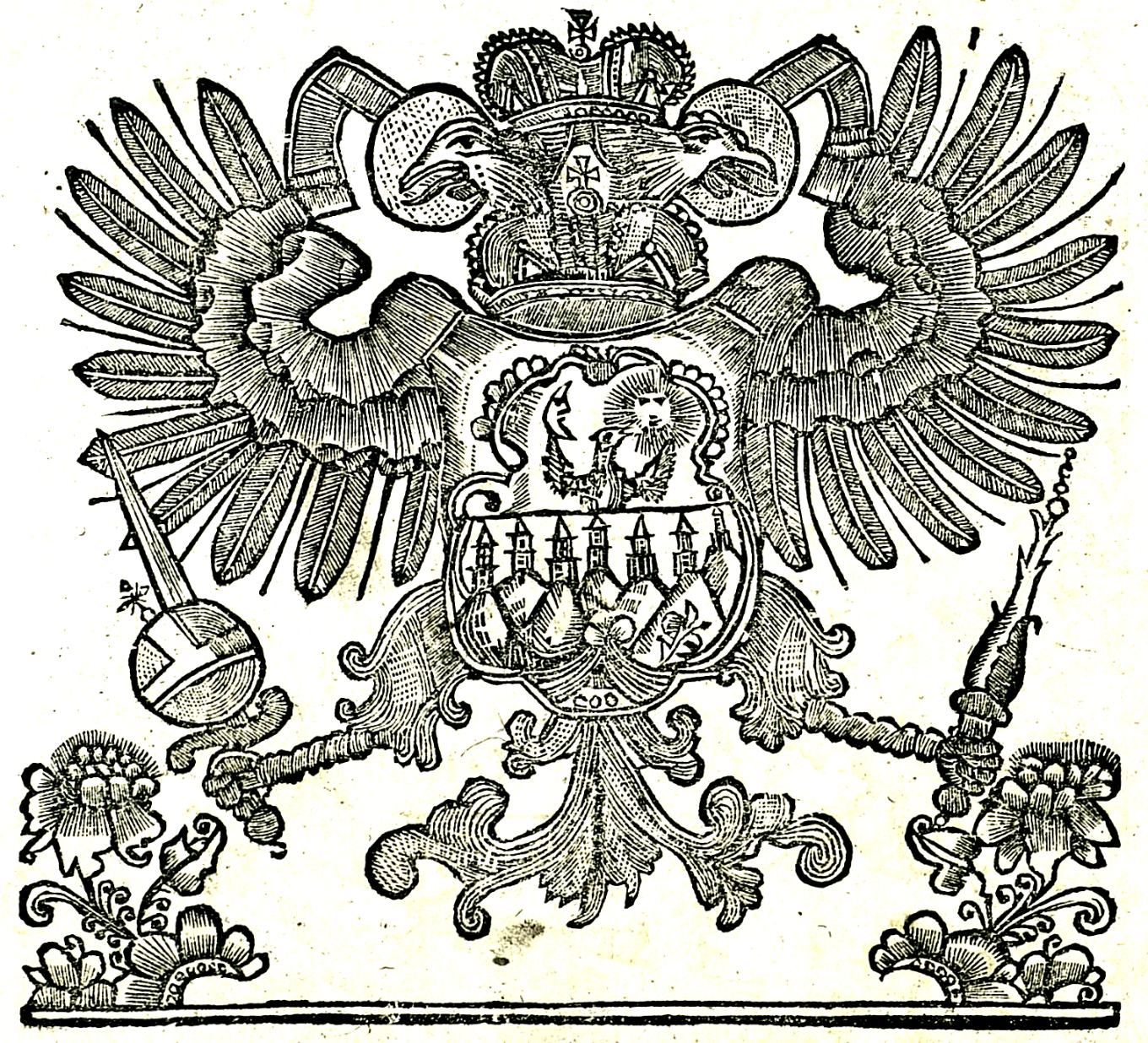
Reichsadler variant in the 1784 Molitvenic

One of Horea's reported emblems

Transylvanian arms as used by Chancellor Sámuel Teleki

Emblem of Erdélyi Magyar Hírvivő in 1790

Arms of Francis as the first Emperor of Austria

Székely seal in 1832

=== Revolutionary usage ===
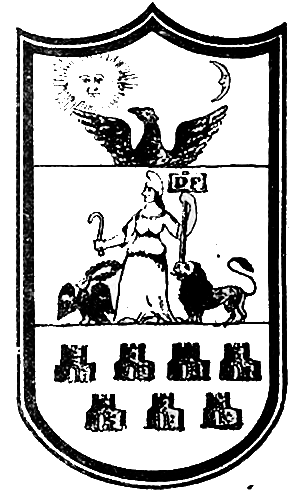
Arms endorsed by Romanian nationalists in the 1840s

Political usage of the red-white-green tricolor by Transylvanian Hungarians was first documented in 1846, when it appeared with members of the Védegylet association; as reported by George Barițiu, most locals were still unaware of this color scheme when the Hungarian Revolution of 1848 broke out. The revolution proclaimed Transylvania's absorption by the Hungarian Kingdom, eventually moving toward separation from the Habsburg realm. Revolutionary leader Lajos Kossuth approved a new set of national symbols, including a "medium" coat of arms with marshalled Transylvanian symbols. Unusually, this depiction used the pre-standardization variant of 1740; it also innovated by showing the Transylvanian arms, and other arms not linked to Hungary-proper, as "joined at both ends by a wavy ribbon, imagined as the national tricolor, [and] attached to the crown." One of the first laws adopted by his government specified that "annexed countries" could "each employ its own colors and arms." In practice, this definition excluded Transylvania. On 30 March, Hungarians in the Transylvanian Diet symbolically removed the 1765 flag from the conference hall and replaced it with the flag of Hungary, only allowing the "blue-red-yellow tricolor" to be displayed on the tapestry of the Diet throne. When Transylvanian delegates visited Pest on 23 April, they were greeted by the flags of both Hungary and Transylvania, alongside a ribbon marked Unió ("Union").

Hungarian communities were committed to the new tricolor, whereas, in 1846, the Saxons had a "national flag" of unspecified colors, with AD RETINENDAM CORONAM. By 1848, they had adopted a variant of the German colors with the arms of Transylvania displayed. Meanwhile, other Saxon communities had the Habsburg flag, or opted for the "Saxon 'national' blue and red colours." The latter's origins are obscure, though writer Teodor V. Păcățian proposes that they may derive from one of the urban flags of Saxon Transylvania. In mid 1848, Saxons were welcomed into the Hungarian National Guard. Many towns, especially Kronstadt and Broos (Orăștie), welcomed this collaboration, but formed their separate units, with distinct symbols. Specifically, these showed, on one side, the seven castles and AD RETINENDAM CORONAM, and on the other, a "coat of arms of the eleven Saxon", alongside FÜR FÜRST, RECHT UND VATERLAND ("For Prince, Law, and Fatherland").

The adoption of separate Saxon flags caused a standoff between the two camps at Regen (Reghin), but created a precedent. The advent of Romanian nationalism produced immediate grievances against this regime and its official heraldry; throughout the Revolution, Romanians and Hungarians fought each other for control of Transylvania, with the former largely loyal to the Habsburg crown. Romanian intellectuals, prompted to adopt their own symbols, opted for white-blue, blue-yellow, red-white, or red-white-blue cockades, also using white flags with blue slogans before May 1848. These groups looked forward to a new arrangement in Transylvania, also proposing a new class of standardized symbols. Their design prominently included a female allegory of "Dacia Felix", alluding to the origin of the Romanians, as well as a lion and aquila. Another proposal was consciously based on 3rd-century coinage issued by Philip the Arab. Also keeping the 1765 format, it added vexilla with markings for Legio V Macedonica and Legio XIII Gemina.

Transylvania's Romanian nationalists continued to experiment with flags, eventually arriving at (generally horizontal) variants of the pan-Romanian tricolor, blue-yellow-red, which, from 1842, had been in use as the flag of Wallachia. Historian Tiberiu Crudu rejects claims that the latter symbol was directly derived from the Transylvanian banner, noting that Romanians in Transylvania did not yet feel represented by the latter; however, he also notes that the "tricolor to which Romanians had been accustomed since 1765" may have had a subtle contribution. Specifically Romanian Transylvanian flags appeared May 1848 assembly in Blaj (Balázsfalva) alongside the Habsburg colors, showing that Romanians remained committed to the monarchy. While some scholars argue that the Romanian color scheme at Blaj already had yellow rather than white, others see this as an invented tradition. Known versions included a blue-white-red or blue-red-white arrangement, claimed by Alexandru Papiu Ilarian as "Transylvania's oldest colors", for being used in the Romanian dress. This origin was also claimed by Ioan Pușcariu, who carried a version of the banner marked with a Romanian version of the slogan Liberté, égalité, fraternité. Pușcariu advocated for the blue-red-yellow of Transylvania and was told by his peers that the gold tassels could reflect that association. Contrasting testimonies suggest that the arrangement was based on the flag of France, or that it was improvised from the "Transylvanian colors [of] red and blue", with the white band as a symbol of peace.

This "flag of the Transylvanian Romanians" was transformed into a red-blue-white, blue-red-white or white-blue-red tricolor, bearing the inscription VIRTUS ROMANA REDIVIVA ("Roman virtue revived"). The slogan's origin can be traced back to Romanian Grenz infantry regiments serving on the Transylvanian Military Frontier. A blue-red-white variant was inscribed with VIRTUTEA ROMÂNĂ REÎNVIATĂ ("Romanian virtue revived"), and carried ribbons in the Habsburg colors, with a slogan honoring Ferdinand I. Several authors note that such a color scheme merely reflected confusion among the Romanians, allowing Hungarians in the Diet to report that it was a pan-Slavic symbol. In Fogaras and Fellak (Feleac), Romanians, specifically Eastern Catholics, opted for alternative flags of blue and yellow.

Barițiu notes that the "white-blue and red tricolor" was used by the Romanian Commission of Sibiu (Nagyszeben), which constituted a "grave error". This flag, he argues, was designed by youth unaware of the "lawful Transylvanian colors", and was even seen by some Romanians as closely resembling the Russian or Serbian flags. Over the following months, blue-yellow-red replaced other variants—either under the influence of flags used in the Wallachian revolution, or because yellow was a Habsburg color. In Habsburg and Hungarian sources, this flag was depicted as a direct successor of the 1765 colors, indicating Romanian "autochtonism" after other Transylvanian communities had embraced ethnic flags. According to museographer Elena Pălănceanu, this tricolor was paraded during the May assembly by the anti-Hungarian folk army gathered by Avram Iancu, and later flown by his guerrilla units throughout the Apuseni Mountains. One variant, featuring an icon and tricolor bordure, is viewed by some historians as one of Iancu's battle flags.

In July 1848, Mór Than designed what would have been the first Hungarian postage stamp, with the Transylvanian arms included. As the conflict turned to military confrontation, anti-Hungarian paramilitaries rallied under the Habsburg or German colors, as well as their own white flag with the slogan AD RETINENDAM CORONAM. In January 1849, during the late stages of this civil war, Ioan Axente Sever's Romanian irregulars, who occupied and ransacked Straßburg (Aiud), also flew the Habsburg bicolor. Following the Hungarian revolutionaries' capitulation, Transylvania was more firmly integrated with the Austrian Empire, with the Székely seal being confiscated. In July 1852, Bishop Andrei Șaguna, as a representative of his Romanian community, met Emperor Franz Joseph I at Kiskossó (Coșevița), on Transylvania's western border. The festivities included a triumphal arch festooned with Habsburg and "blue-yellow-red" Transylvanian flags marked VIRIBUS UNITIS ("With United Forces")—the Habsburg motto. Later that year, Transylvanian Governor Karl von Schwarzenberg ordered the reintroduction of a regional flag, but used an incorrect color scheme, switching the blue and red bands. Various authors describe this as a conscious variation on the Romanian tricolor, meant to underline the connection between the monarchy and loyalist Romanians; the tricolor scheme was also granted to Șaguna upon his appointment as Reichsfreiherr.

One of the Romanian Transylvanian tricolor schemes used in 1848 (with Habsburg ribbons)

Arms of Transylvania (top right) marshaled into the coat of arms of the Hungarian State (1849)

Saxon colors on the militia flag of Heldsdorf, 1849 or later

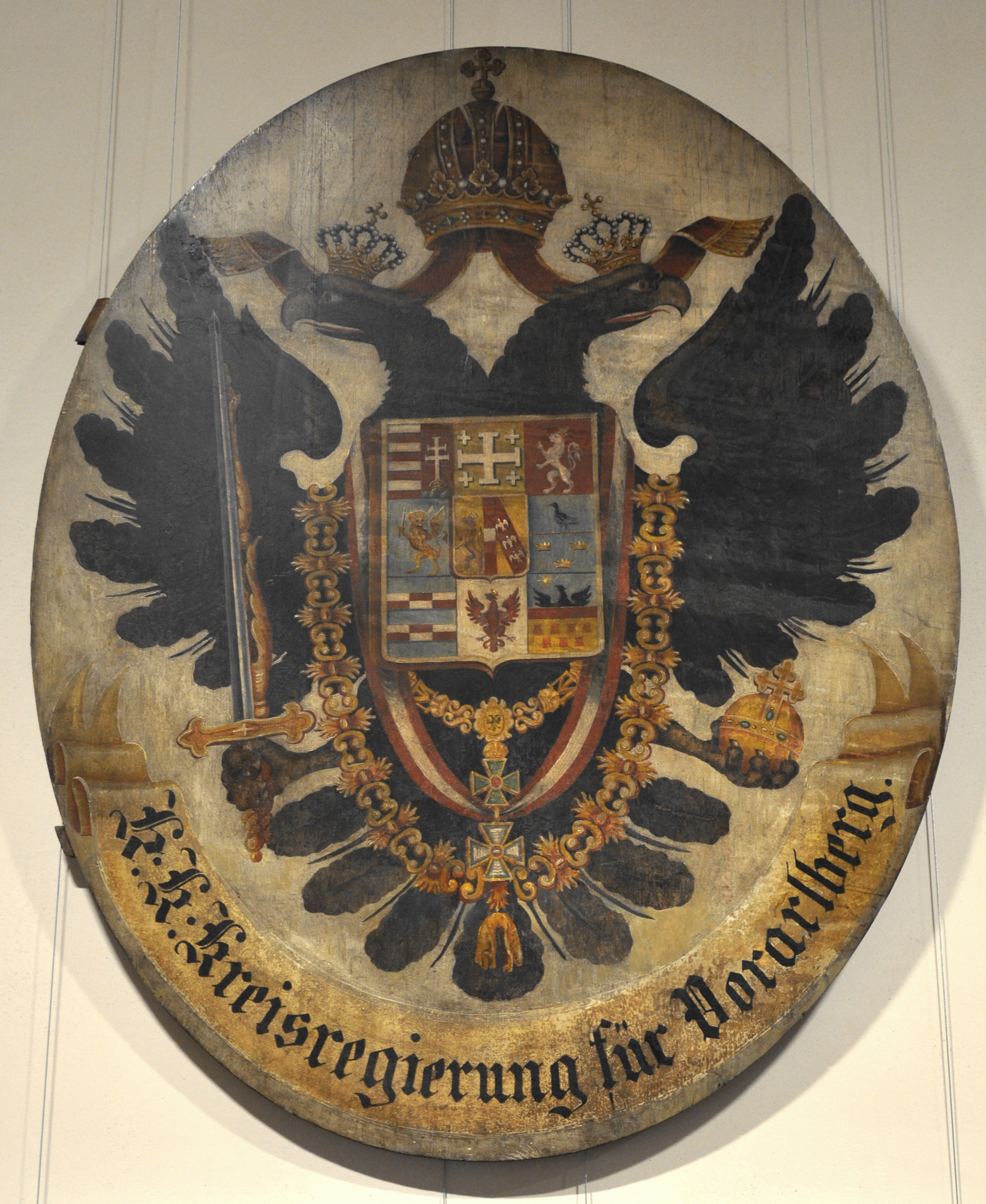
Variant of Austrian arms in 1850

Flag reportedly endorsed by Karl von Schwarzenberg (1852)

=== Austria-Hungary ===
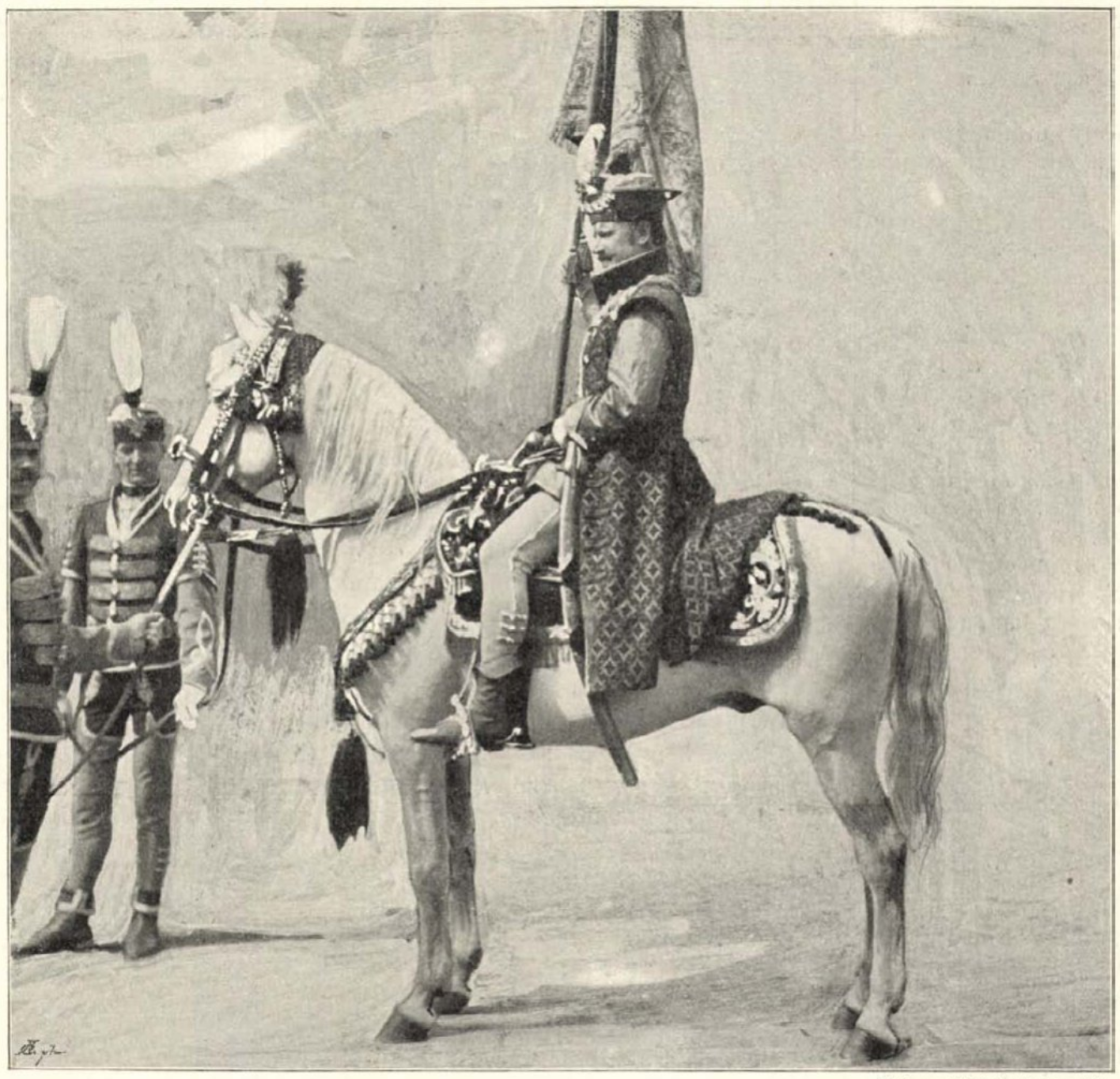
András Bethlen with the Transylvanian banner at the Hungarian Millennium celebrations, May 1896

During the subsequent reconciliation between Hungarians and Austrians, Transylvania was merged back into Hungary. This process, which included restoring heraldic symbols to the Székely nation in June 1861, was resisted by Romanians. In 1862, ASTRA Society for Cultural Advancement staged an exhibit and political rally, which included tricolor flags and a tapestry with the Transylvanian arms protected by a lion, alongside the slogan INDEPENDENȚA TRANSILVANIEI ("Independence for Transylvania"). In July 1863, Romanian members of the Transylvanian Diet presented a draft law "on the equality of the various nationalities". Its Article 5 specified that: "A symbol particular to the Romanian nation shall be added to the Transylvanian arms." During the elections of late 1865, Romanians gathering to oppose centralization reportedly flew a large flag "in Transylvania's colors"; their Hungarian opponents used the red-white-and-green.

In this context, the Romanian community had opted for the Transylvanian eagle as its own ethnic symbol; in 1865, its representatives in the unified Diet of Hungary submitted a demand for heraldic symbols to represent "the Romanian nation in the Transylvanian bordeland", namely: "an eagle standing on a rock, holding a cross in its beak", and a flag colored "blue, red, yellow". Outside Transylvania, Romanian activists were generally more accepting of the 1765 arms, which were featured, alongside the Moldavian and Wallachian shields, on the medal Norma, issued by Wallachia's Philharmonic Society in 1838. Cezar Bolliac gave this arrangement a colored version in 1856, selecting tinctures that would reflect the Romanian tricolor, with Transylvania in yellow (or). Upon the unification of Moldavia and Wallachia in 1859, Transylvanian emblems were left out of the national arms. The presence of a "Dacian" woman and lions in supporters in all Romanian national arms between 1866 and 1872 was an homage to the 1848 proposal.

Transylvanian symbols were again added to the medium coat of arms of Hungary following the establishment of Austria-Hungary in 1867. They were also prominently marshalled into in the amalgamated state arms of Austria-Hungary. The subsequent centralization cancelled all need for regional symbols, which were relegated to a ceremonial role. The informal Transylvanian flag was again recorded as "blue, red and yellow" in the late 1860s, with prints issued by the Armenian Zacharias Gábrus. A flag for the old crownland was also carried by Antal Esterházy (or, according to other reports, by Albert Bánffy) at Franz Joseph's coronation in June 1867. This marked the first-ever appearance of Transylvanian symbols at the enthronement of a Hungarian Habsburg king. It was not the Gábrus tricolor, but a banner of arms: "The blue flag, about a meter wide, bordered with gold, [is] decorated with the coat of arms of Transylvania in the middle".

Two months later, the coat of arms was on show at the Romanian Literary Society in Bucharest. Though intended to show the cultural unity between Romanians within and without Austria-Hungary, this exhibit was criticized by nationalist writer Bogdan Petriceicu Hasdeu for still describing regional divisions between Transylvanian, Wallachian, and Moldavian Romanians. In a contrary move, Bolliac retained the towers, the sun, and the moon (but not the eagle) in his unusually arranged and hatched design for Transylvanian arms on Michael the Brave's monument in University Square (1874–1876). This heraldic trend was followed by anonymous authors from either Wallachia or Transylvania, who were popularizing nationalist coats of arms for the Banat, Maramureș, and Crișana—three ethnographic subdivisions of Partium. Crișana's arms, as published in 1881 by A. E. Gorjan, were directly inspired by those of Transylvania, in that they featured a derivative eagle.

In 1868, Romanian politicians submitted for review another bill, which stated that "every nation has the right to use its national flag [...] in public political ceremonies and on public buildings, but only alongside the flag of the Hungarian crown". As reported by Pacațian, from 1848 to 1874, Romanians in and around Transylvania, including in the Banat and Maramureș, "used our national tricolor, and bore its colors on any given occasion, with no hindrance or annoyance by anyone". He reports the tricolor being an electoral flag of both pro- and anti-Hungarian Romanians. Hungarian Prime Minister Kálmán Tisza sought to curb this practice in 1874, allowing only the Hungarian tricolor to be used within the Kingdom's borders, and instituting a system of fines and penalties for those who disobeyed. Romanians generally ignored the order, or invented methods for circumventing it—such as wearing red hats decorated with blue leaves and yellow lettering. The standardized regional flag was still flown at various festivities, though its interpretation varied between Romanians and Hungarians. The "Romanian, that is to say Transylvanian flag" and the Habsburg flag were reportedly used together at Maypole dances in Kronstadt by 1881. That year, a Hungarian tricolor and a "Saxon flag" were added; the former's appearance led to a publicized brawl, with claims that Romanian students had put up the national flag of another country.

Over the 1880s, Romanians continued to argue that the Transylvanian tricolor was a cherished symbol, but regional rather than ethnic. In 1885, the community newspaper Tribuna expressed indignation at Hungarian suggestions that the Romanian state tricolor was a derivative of Transylvania's color scheme. The same year, the Romanian Athletic and Singing Society had adopted emblems with the "Transylvanian tricolor". Another incident in June 1888 saw the Romanians of Belényes (Beiuș) removing and desecrating the Hungarian national flag. In the aftermath, the community was ordered by government to cease flying the Transylvanian colors. No flags were on show during Franz Joseph's tour of Beszterce-Naszód in 1891, after local Hungarians explicitly rejected either a "Saxon flag" or the "Romanian tricolor, which is also Transylvania's flag". In 1892, Romanian youth gathering at Nagyszeben defied the ban by flying three separate monochrome flags of red, yellow, and blue.

Transylvanian regional symbols were sometimes reclaimed by other members of the Hungarian community. In May 1896, during celebrations of the Hungarian Millennium, András Bethlen presented the blue banner of 1867 to Franz Joseph; it had been since hidden, lost, and ultimately found in the Bonțida Bánffy Castle. Some Romanians and Saxons also took part in the festivities, carrying "millennial flags" representing their various civic communities. In 1903, Romanian lawyer Eugen Lemeni was fined and imprisoned for decorating a ballroom hall with Habsburg flags and the "Transylvanian emblem". During the Hungarian elections of 1906, the Romanian National Party (PNR) used white flags with green-leaf patterns, as well as green cockades, but these were also confiscated by the authorities. The Romanian (and Transylvanian) colors were camouflaged into another symbolic arrangement: the PNR distributed lapels with a blue quill and a yellow leaf, adding candidates' names in red letters. During those years, Romanian nationalist clubs began using an array of heraldic symbols evoking Dacia and the Romans. As early as 1871, the color scheme also spread into the Duchy of Bukovina, a Romanian-inhabited part of Cisleithania, where it was identified and repressed as a symbol of "anti-Austrian" subversion. Before deciding on this issue, Governor Bourguignon heard reports about flag usage among the Transylvanian loyalists; his panel of experts disagreed on whether the flag was a Transylvanian symbol or a derivation of Romania's flag, but most viewed it as a staple of pan-Romanian "irredentism".

Red and blue (popularly read as symbolic for love and sincerity) survived on flags used by rural communities of Transylvanian Saxons—including those of youth fraternities in Keisd (Saschiz), some of which date back to the 1860s. During the 1890s, this color scheme had been adopted by Hungarian police officers in Saxon cities. At that stage, Saxon activists who frowned upon Magyarization created another regional flag, bearing the old triquetra and the slogan AD RETINENDAM CORONAM—a design originally found in a highly popular print by Georg Bleibtreu (1884). The new Prime Minister, Dezső Bánffy, responded with an explicit ban on Saxon symbols. A red-over-blue bicolor, also identified as the "Saxon flag", sparked litigation in Bistritz (Bistrița) during June 1898, after Hungarian police tried to register and prosecute it as a "foreign flag". A compromised was reached in August, when the authorities of Brassó (Brașov) were allowed to fly the blue-red for Johannes Honter's 400th anniversary, but only if "evenly represented" with the Hungarian colors. The crossed swords were also revisited as a community symbol, with bishop Friedrich Teutsch explaining that they reflected an old Saxon legend: "When our fathers came into the land, they thrust two swords crosswise into the earth and swore allegiance to the king and the land over them." Teutsch himself used blue-over-red flags, which the Gendarmes took down from his parish church in 1909. Other groups of Saxons had similar bicolor banners and ribbons with the Transylvanian arms—as with the Association of Transylvanian Saxons in Munich, founded in 1910.

Medium arms of Hungary (1867)

Cezar Bolliac's redesign of the arms (1874)

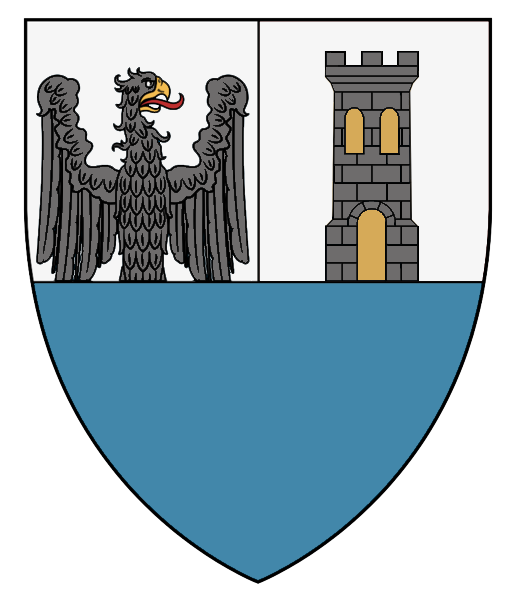
Unofficial Romanian arms of Crișana

Romanian Cobblers' Guild banner (1867)

Tricolor used in 1869 election by supporters of Iosif Hodoșiu (reverse side)

=== Romanian Transylvanian tricolor ===
Flag used during the Great Union of 1918

Writing shortly after the Millennium, Sterca-Șuluțiu proposed that the Transylvanian tinctures and the Romanian flag had a single, "Dacian" and "twice-millennial" origin—though he admitted not being able to tell why Maria Theresa had selected them. He acknowledged that nationalist Romanians in both Transylvania and Bukovina had been using the 1765 color scheme as an excuse to fly the Romanian colors, but also that this practice was dying out under Hungarian pressures. In the 1890s, some Romanians were openly embracing the claim that Romania's flag was an altered "Transylvanian tricolor". One anonymous essayist from Bucharest argued in 1892 that the "red, yellow and blue" scheme was embraced by Transylvanian Romanians opposing merger into Hungary in 1848. He argued that, while Hungarians were forced to reject the "old Transylvanian" tricolor, nationalists in Wallachia and Moldavia also had to renounce traditional tinctures, and embrace a Transylvanian symbol. In 1901, the theory was reviewed as "seductive" and "probable" by Romanian journalist Constantin Berariu. It was embraced by Ștefan Cicio Pop, who, in late 1910, used it to defend flag-wavers arrested in Alsó-Fehér County.

In August 1911, a large Romanian meeting was again hosted by Balázsfalva, in this instance convened by ASTRA. The Hungarian authorities of Alsó-Fehér were convinced to participate, taking seat under a tapestry showing en eagle and tower alongside the "Transylvanian tricolor: blue, yellow and red [sic]." This was a design by Octavian Smigelschi for Blaj Cathedral, with the tower also read as a depiction of "New Jerusalem". ASTRA's other symbols by 1911 were all-blue banners marked with the names of its sections, or generic slogans. Delegate Horia Petra-Petrescu also proposed an all-white flag marked BLAJ, which, he argued, was enough of a symbol for the Romanian communities. The tricolor ambiguity was retained during the celebrations of 10 May 1914, when Romanian students gathered to celebrate the Kingdom of Romania's national holiday. Hungarian authorities broke up the rallies, citing the aggravating presence of Romanian colors. The students were defended by Pop, who claimed that the suspicious color scheme could just as well stand for Transylvania or the Budapest tricolor.

Over the following months, with the outbreak of World War I, the Common Army tolerated, or even encouraged, the use of Romanian banners by Transylvanian conscripts. Brassó was reportedly the first Transylvanian city to allow their flying at a public gathering. In 1915, Prime Minister István Tisza modified his father's 1874 legislation, allowing Romanians to fly "their national colors", but only if accompanied by the "state colors". This reportedly marked the first time in history when Romanian nationalists voluntarily embraced the Hungarian tricolor. Although Romania remained neutral until 1916, Hungarian authorities again introduced proscriptions against the Romanian colors in February 1915. In October, a revamped version of the Hungarian arms, with minor adjustments to its Transylvanian quarter, was done by József Sebestyén Keöpeczi, a Transylvanian Hungarian scholar and painter. This design also entered the new common medium coat of arms adopted that year by Austria-Hungary. This move generated some controversy, with Hungarian nationalists such as Géza Polónyi arguing that the heraldic representation of an obsolete crownland on a major symbol would undermine the monarchy's "parity dualism". Towards the end of the year, Romania failed in her attempt to conquer Transylvania—upon which the Hungarian authorities of Marosvásárhely (Târgu Mureș) issued plaquettes with the Transylvanian arms alongside Saint George and the Dragon (in which the Dragon stood for Romania).

With the crowning of Charles IV in November 1916, Transylvanian colors made a final official appearance at the Habsburg court, being carried there by Count Ádám Teleki. According to Moisil, under Charles the region was no longer depicted in the Hungarian coat of arms, but was still represented within the amalgamated Austro-Hungarian arms. Following the Aster Revolution of 1918, Transylvanian Romanians began organizing themselves to demand union with Romania, flying horizontal tricolors of blue-yellow-red. Transylvanian soldiers stationed in Prague helped turn that city over to the Czechoslovak National Council; in recognition the city populace presented them with tricolor tippets, which were colored red-blue-yellow or yellow-blue-red. Many tricolor variants, with yellow as the middle color, were used during the popular rallies on the event marked in Romania as the Great Union (1 December 1918). Eyewitness Petru Tămâian described these as being the "beautiful Transylvanian tricolor", distinguishing them from the vertically arranged flag of Romania; when superimposed, they "seemingly create a sign of the cross, symbolizing sufferings on both sides". Activist Vasile Goldiș also mentions the "beautiful Romanian tricolor of Transylvania" as being the flag held by Ioan Arion, who was shot by the Hungarian National Guard on his way to the rally in Alba Iulia.

The Saxons of Sibiu, who favored union with Romania, rallied under both the Romanian flag and a design of their own: "There was a search for the Saxon national banner and, since none was available, they brought in a prapur decked in red and blue ribbons". In Medwesch (Mediaș), a Saxon National Guard, which existed for some six days in December 1918, used a red-over-blue or blue-over-red bicolor, and assorted cockades. Saxon activists displayed their loyalism toward Greater Romania while continuing to show attachment toward regional symbols: Saxon officials greeting ASTRA delegates in Sibiu during July 1920 "carried many a Saxon banner." Attempts to restore an independent Transylvania were still considered by a Hungarian jurist, Elemér Gyárfás. In March 1919, he approached the PNR's Iuliu Maniu with the offer to codify an "indissoluble union of three nations" (Transylvanian Romanians, Hungarians, and Saxons). This proposed state was to have its own seal and flag. Faced with the prospect of being absorbed as a minority in Romania, some Hungarians attempted to resist and invoked the Fourteen Points against the Alba Iulia assembly. Writer István Zágoni reports that a "Székely Republic movement" hoisted its flag in Marosvásárhely, but that other Hungarians wanted it torn down. Artist Károly Kós is reported to have sought the separation of Kalotaszeg, for which he designed a flag and coat of arms.

Arms variant by Hugo Gerard Ströhl

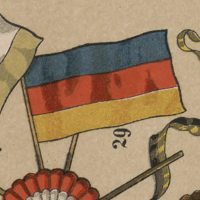
Ströhl's rendition of the Transylvanian flag (1900)

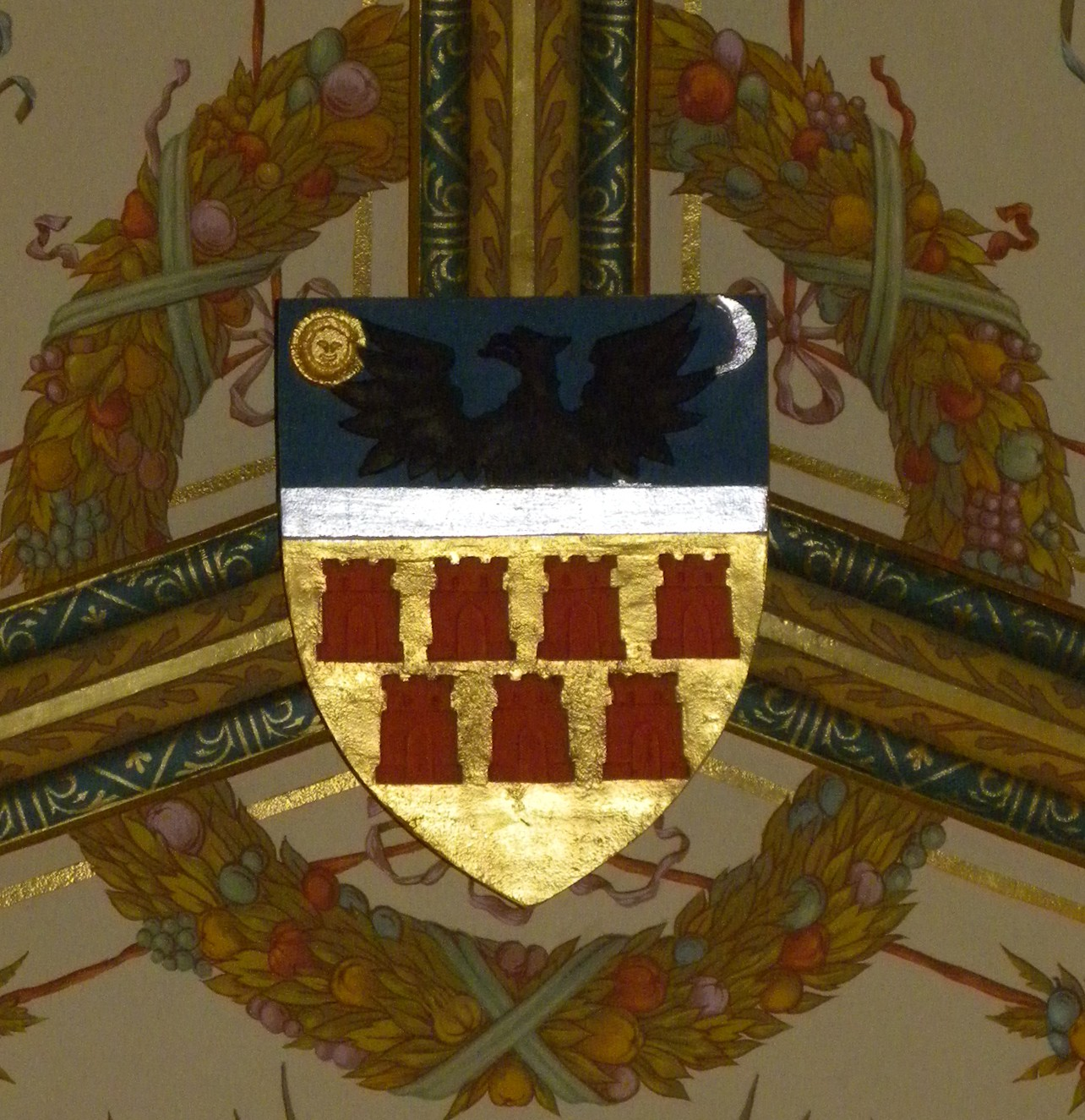
Arms as depicted in the Hungarian Parliament Building (1904)

Flag of the Székely Division (1919)

=== Later echoes ===
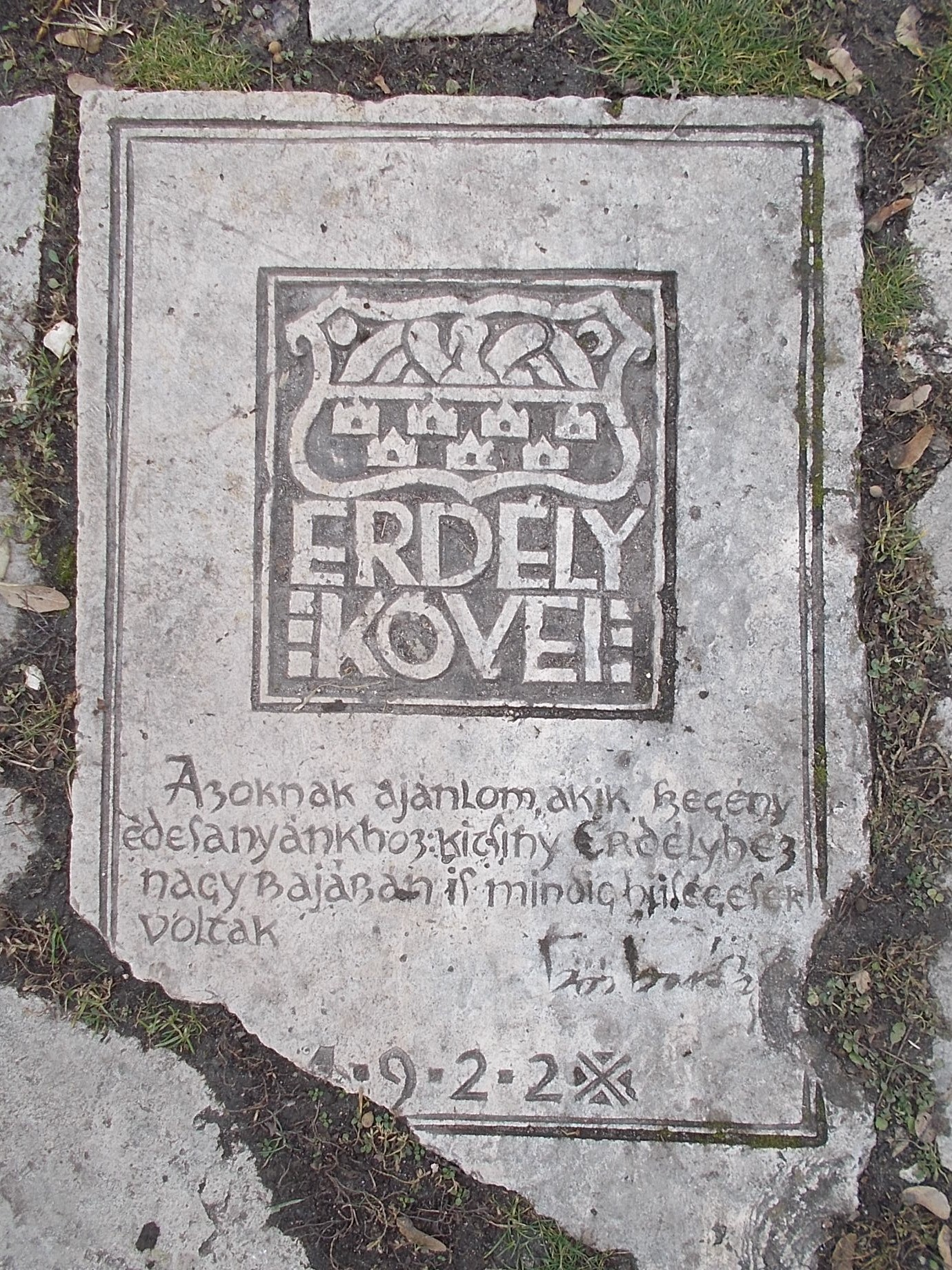
Carving of Károly Kós's Erdély kövei arms, in Wekerletelep

As part of the union process of 1918–1922, Transylvania's symbols became an integral part of the Romanian arms. One of the first projects to include them in this overall arrangement was drafted in 1921 by Paul Gore, wherein the Transylvanian quarter also represented all of the former Partium. In Gore's original version, the fess was removed, and the field was divided or over purpure, while the towers were again replaced by seven hills, or. Another 1921 design, proposed to the Heraldic Commission by Keöpeczi, was closely based on Maria Theresa's arms of 1765. Under the new conventions, it was also used to symbolize the adjacent lands of Maramureș and Crișana, overshadowing earlier projects to emerge as the Greater Romanian arms. Derivative arms also appeared for Romanian institutions: the 28th Infantry Regiment, stationed in Târgu Mureș, featured both the city arms, with the Székely arm-and-sword, and the seven towers. Such heraldic arrangements still met some opposition, with a formal protest registered soon after adoption by magistrate Constantin Obedeanu and other intellectuals. This group favored only minimal changes to Romania's previous coat of arms, with the inclusion of the lions and hills in Michael the Brave's seal as a stand-in for Transylvania.

In contrast, the 1765 arms returned as symbols of Hungarian irredentism during the Regency period. Also in 1921, a statue called "East" was erected in Szabadság tér, Budapest. It showed Prince Csaba setting free a female figure bearing the Transylvanian shield. Another political statement was the Transylvanian folk-song collection of Béla Bartók and Zoltán Kodály, which, on its 1921 edition cover, displayed the "coat of arms of Transylvania under the Hungarian royal crown". In April 1922, an "impressive procession" of irredentists took place outside St. Stephen's Basilica in Lipótváros. A "flag of separated Transylvania" was carried therein by Nándor Urmánczy, on behalf of his National Defense Party. The medium arms of 1915, including Transylvania's symbols, were still endorsed by the Regency, but for two decades appeared only rarely on its official insignia; usage again peaked in 1938–1944. A flag of Kalotaszeg was carried at the Vigadó of Pest during celebrations of Otto von Habsburg's birthday, in November 1930.

Some usage of the 1765 arms was also documented among the Hungarians of Romania, as with the Puttonyos Winery, which continued to operate in Aiud under Romanian rule. Activist József Sándor reportedly hid the banner of a main Hungarian cultural association, EMKE, which displayed the arms of Hungary with those of Transylvania inescutcheon. Kós, who designed various versions of the Transylvanian arms (including in his 1922 album, Erdély kövei), eventually established the Hungarian People's Party as a voice of Transylvanianism in Romania—the group is known to have used a flag of its own. In June 1924, Romanian authorities banned the use of Saxon flags on public buildings, and ruled that all private displays need to include Romanian flags of similar size and make. This measure was condemned, on the Romanian side, by Păcățian, who argued that Saxons had both a moral and a legal right to their own bicolor. In early 1939, schoolteacher Georg Kraft of Dedrad (Zepling) successfully defended in court his right to fly the Saxon colors alongside the Romanian ones.

At the height of World War II, following a re-partition of the region, Northern Transylvania was briefly reincorporated with Hungary. Shortly after this, in September 1940, the Székely College Students' Association created a flag for the youth at Franz Joseph University. One side was "embroidered with the coat of arms of Transylvania and the inscription Erdély örök, egyetlen miénk felírás ['Eternal Transylvania is ours forever']." A new set of monuments, featuring the eagle together with the medium arms of Hungary, were erected throughout the annexed areas. In 1941, a Hungarian ethnographer, Gábor Lükő, revisited the blue-red-yellow and its origins, suggesting that it had been invented by Gabriel Bethlen and "was taken over by the Romanians in 1848". He believed this color scheme to have seeped into the folk art of the Csángós, which was being unfairly censored in Hungary for looking "Romanian". During this renewed integration with the Hungarian crown, Béla Teleki and other local intellectuals established a regionalist and corporatist group called Transylvanian Party; it did not use the regional flag and coat of arms, but had a depiction of Saint Ladislaus as its logo.

The region was ultimately recovered by Romania during the Battle of Romania in 1944. In its aftermath, projects for a unified and independent Transylvania received some backing from the Soviet Union, with Romanian flags being routinely removed from official buildings; concrete projects of independence were submitted by Kós and Valter Roman, with Teofil Vescan proclaiming himself Prime Minister of the unrecognized country. A rumor recorded in Telegraful Român in November 1944 had it that former Hungarian officials in Cluj had switched to wearing the red flag as an armband, before switching again to "the colors of Romanian Transylvania: blue, yellow, and red". A draft proposal, submitted anonymously on behalf of the Second Hungarian Republic in mid 1945 (and since attributed to scholar Gábor Balás), discussed a neutral Federal Republic of Transylvania, coterminous with "historical Transylvania". It noted: "The colors of the flag of the Independent Transylvania [are] blue and gold. In addition to the state flag, however, all nations are free to use their own national flag."

Arms with a Transylvanian canton remained a Romanian national symbol throughout this period, until being removed by communist rule (see Emblem of the Socialist Republic of Romania). The regime involved itself in removing signs of Hungarian irredentism, such as plastering over the medium Hungarian arms on the 1941 monument in Lueta (Lövéte). It was cleaned up by community representatives during the Romanian Revolution of 1989. In spring 1990, projects were submitted for the arms of post-revolutionary Romania. Transylvania was prominently displayed in sketches submitted by Maria Dogaru, who also proposed adopting VIRTUS ROMANA REDIVIVA as the national motto. The 1921 arms were reinstated, with some modifications, under the 1992 Constitution, and were again reconfirmed in 2016.

Following the revival of heraldry in post-communist Romania, azure and gules, identified as the "Transylvanian colors", were used for the new arms of Miklós Székely National College; Simeria Reformed Church in Sfântu Gheorghe also features a 1992 mural with the 1765 arms of Transylvania. In 1996, the municipality of Ozun (Uzon) displayed the same symbol at an artificial forest which celebrated Hungarian presence in Transylvania and commemorated the soldiers of 1848. The Saxon diaspora in Germany has also continued to make use of regional symbols. In the 1990s, those who settled in Crailsheim still displayed the "Transylvanian" or "Saxon colors", described as "blue and red". Usage of the flag and coat of arms was being replaced around 2017 by displays of the logo for the Union of Transylvanian Saxons in Germany. Usage of Sibiu's coat of arms (a derivative of the triquetra arms), alongside those of Transylvania-proper, had a major revival beginning in 2007, when the city was a European Capital of Culture.

At the same stage, a Székely autonomy movement had begun using its own derivative symbol—the blue-gold-silver flag with the sun-and-moon. In September 2014, western Transylvanian Hungarians affiliated with the Hungarian People's Party selected a flag and coat of arms for Partium, in a form derived from the unrealized project of 1659. A blue-red-yellow tricolor is also spotted at rallies in support of increased autonomy for the region or its Hungarian communities. A controversy erupted on Hungarian National Day (15 March) 2017, after reports that the Romanian Gendarmerie fined people for displaying the colors. This account was rejected by Gendermerie officials, according to whom the fines were handed out to those demonstrators who refused to disperse after their authorization had expired. Transylvanian symbols, including the coat of arms, have been on display at football matches involving CFR Cluj, which has a mixed Romanian-and-Hungarian fan base.

Small arms of Romania (1921)

Paul Gore's design for the Transylvanian arms, 1921

Transylvanian Party logo

Flag used by Saxon cultural bodies

Flag of the Szekler National Council and the Székelys
