= Berta Bock =

Romanian composer (1857–1945)

- Born: Berta Johanna Amalie Spech; 15 March 1857; Hermannstadt, Transylvania, Austrian Empire
- Died: 4 April 1945 (aged 88); Sibiu, Transylvania, Kingdom of Romania
- Spouse: Karl Ernst Bock (m. 1881; died 1936)
- Children: 3

Berta Johanna Amalie Bock (née Spech; 15 March 1857 – 4 April 1945) was a Romanian composer best known for her 1927 opera Die Pfingstkrone, and the pantomime-ballets Klein Elschens (1905) and Das erste Veilchen (1906). She was also a piano and singing teacher.

== Early life ==
Berta Johanna Amalie Spech was born on 15 March 1857 in Hermannstadt, Transylvania, Austrian Empire (now Sibiu, Romania) into a musical family. She was the daughter of lawyer Adolf Spech and Berta Amalie von Konradsheim, a novice singer. She was of German Saxon descent. Her grandfather Wilhelm Conrad, Baron von Conradsheim had founded the Hermannstädter Musikverein in Sibiu. Her musical education began as a child, when she was taught piano and theory by the conductor Hermann Bönicke and Berta Spech, and received vocal training from Rosa Pfaff. In her biography, she later recalled frequently crying as a child due to the lack of educational opportunities for girls and wishing instead that she had been born a boy.

== Career ==
In her compositions, Bock mainly created text-based pieces. She created choral, church, stage and lieder works, with many of the latter being inspired by Saxon folk music. To hide that she was a woman, her German publishers released her work under the name B. Bock.

During her career, Bock toured Transylvania, Austria and Germany. She often attended Bishop Georg Daniel Teutsch's artistic soirées in Sibiu, in addition to holding her own cultural salon. She was also a piano and singing pedagogue.

In 1905, she wrote the pantomime-ballet Klein Elschens, followed by another titled Das erste Veilchen the next year. Both ballets are among her most popular creations. Another one of her popular works was the opera Die Pfingstkrone, which was inspired by Transylvanian Saxon folklore and premiered in 1927. It was performed across Transylvania, including in Bock's native Sibiu in 1927, before being staged in Cleveland, Ohio, in the early 1930s. Some of her other works were also performed in London and Paris.

== Personal life and death ==
Bock married banker Karl Ernst Bock (died 1936) in 1881. They had three children together.

She wrote her autobiography in 1942.

Bock died in Sibiu on 4 April 1945, at the age of 88.

== Works ==
Bock composed an opera, several ballets and songs for voice and piano. Selected works include:

- Die Pfingstkrone, opera
- Die alte Linde, op. 10 no. 4 (Text: Anna Schullerus)
- Ich sah im Felde, op. 12 no. 5 (Text: R. Kandt)
- Noch bin ich jung, op. 6 no. 3 (Text: Helene Tiedemann)
- Über den Bergen, op. 9 no. 1 (Text: Karl (or Carl) Busse)
- Vor der Schmiede, op. 7 no. 1 (Text: Reinhard Volker)
