= Georg Daniel Teutsch =

Transylvanian historian and Lutheran bishop (1817–1893)

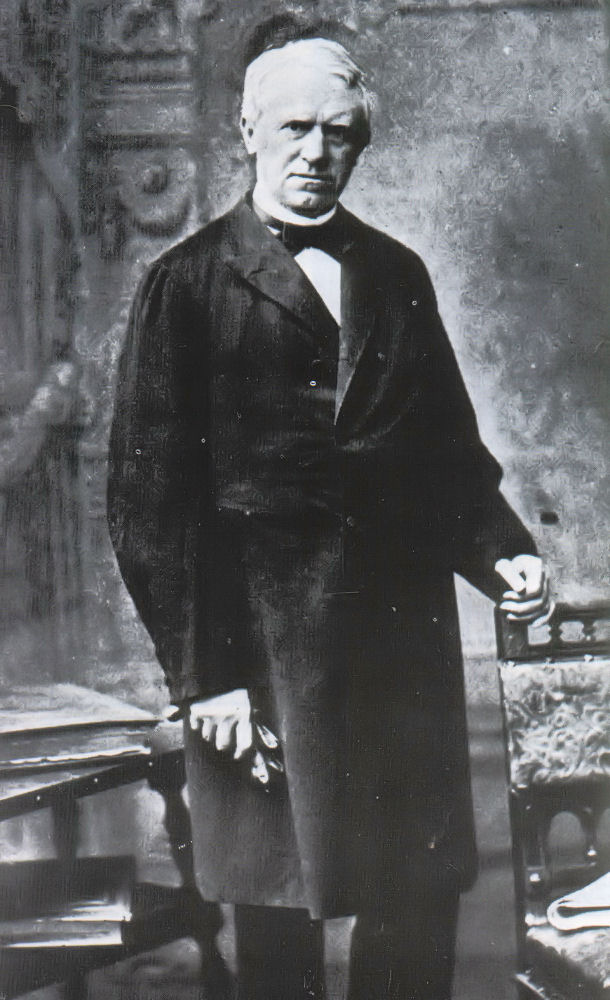
- Born: December 12, 1817; Schässburg, Austrian Empire
- Died: July 2, 1893 (aged 75); Hermannstadt, Austria-Hungary

Georg Daniel Teutsch (December 12, 1817, in Schässburg, Austrian Empire – July 2, 1893, in Hermannstadt, Austria-Hungary) was a Transylvanian Saxon historian and bishop of the Lutheran (Augsburg Confession) Church in Transylvania.

== Biography ==
Teutsch was born in Schässburg, in the Grand Principality of Transylvania, Austrian Empire (now Sighișoara, Romania). He was bishop of the Transylvanian Saxons.

== Publications ==
Teutsch published 87 works and larger studies, apart of numerous smaller contributions. His work includes several biographical sketches of Transylvanian personalities. Here are the main titles according to the Deutsche Biographie online entry.

- Compendium of the History of Transylvania [up to 1526] (German: Abriss der Geschichte Siebenbürgens), 1844 in a wider collection of texts, 1865 by itself
- History of the Transylvanian Saxons for the Saxon People (German: Geschichte der Siebenbürger Sachsen für das sächsische Volk) [up to 1699; co tinued later by his son], 6 vols., Kronstadt, 1852-58; 1874 (2nd ed.), 1925 (4th ed.)
- The Reformation in the Transylvanian Saxon Lands (German: Die Reformation im Sachsenland), 1852
- Book of Historical Documents from Transylvania [up to 1301] (German: Urkundenbuch zur Geschichte Siebenbürgens), Vienna, 1857 (editor, with Friedrich Firnhaber, head of the Austrian Imperial archives)
- The Tithe Right of the Evangelical Church of the Augsburg Confession in Transylvania (German: Das Zehntrecht der evangelischen Landeskirche A. B. in Siebenbürgen), 1858
- Transylvanian Chronicle of the Schäßburg Town Clerk Georg Kraus. 1608–1665. (German: Siebenbürgische Chronik des Schäßburger Stadtschreibers Georg Kraus. 1608–1665.), 2 vols., 1862-64 (editor)
- Book of Documents of the Evangelical Church of the Augsburg Confession in Transylvania (German: Urkundenbuch der evangelischen Landeskirche A. B. in Siebenbürgen), 2 vols., Hermannstadt, 1862/83 (editor)
  - 1st vol. (1862): covers the 16th and 17th centuries.
  - 2nd vol. (1883): "The Synod Proceedings of the Evangelical Church A.B. in Transylvania during the Century of the Reformation" (German: Die Synodalverhandlungen der evangelischen Kirche A.B. in Siebenbürgen im Reformationsjahrhundert)
- Reformatio ecclesiae Coronensis ac totius Barcensis provinciae (Latin: The Reformation of the Church of Brașov and the Entire Province of Burzenland), 1865 (editor)
