= Delores Teutsch =

Washington State politician

Delores E. Teutsch

Member of the Washington House of Representatives from the 45th district
- In office January 8, 1979 – January 10, 1983
- Preceded by: Will Knedlik
- Succeeded by: Louise Miller

Personal details
- Born: September 9, 1935 (age 90) Seattle, Washington, U.S.
- Party: Republican
- Education: University of Washington
- Occupation: Home coordinator; civic activist

Delores E. Teutsch (born September 9, 1935) is a former American politician who served as a member of the Washington House of Representatives from 1979 to 1983. She represented Washington's 45th legislative district as a Republican. In the 1981 to 1983 term, she served as chair of the Higher Education Committee.

In 1993, governor Mike Lowry appointed Teutsch, along with Hubert Locke and Ruth Coffin Schroeder, to a Citizens Commission on Government Ethics and Campaign Finance Reform to review potential problems in the Public Disclosure Commission's investigation of illegal campaigning.

Outside the legislature, she was affiliated with the Washington Athletic Club and the Business and Professional Women's Club and served on the Board of Trustees of Bellevue Community College.
