= Martin Schrot =

German goldsmith and engraver

Martin Schrot (Augsburg, ? – c. 1576) was a German goldsmith and engraver from Augsburg. His name has also been spelled "Schrott" and "Schroth". He is not to be confused with the Protestant poet from Augsburg with the same name.

Schrot was born in Augsburg and stayed in his native city for most of his life. He acted as a goldsmith, copperplate engraver, bookkeeper, and also as a townsman. In his book Wappenbuch, the tinctures were designated with the given names of the colours. Schrot's Wappenbuch has been described as "one of the most important armorials of the sixteenth century".

== Works ==
- Wappen-Buch des hohen geistlichen und weltlichen Stands der Christenheit in Europa, des apostolischen Stuels zu Rom, der Patriarchen, Cardinälen, Ertz- und gemaine Bistumben... auch der Universiteten und hohen Schulen Namen und Wappen; dessgleichen auch des Römischen Reichs unnd Kayserthumbs, der Christlichen Königreichen, Chur- unnd Fürstenthumb, Graff- unnd Herrschafften... Durch Martin Schrot,... zusamen getragen. – Getruckt zu München, 1576. – In-4o, sign. A-Y, coats of arms.
- Wappenbuch des Heiligen Römischen Reichs, vnd allgemainer Christenheit in Europa, insonderheit des Teutschen Keyserthumbs, an vnd zugehörige Chur vnd Fürstenthumb, auch Ertz vnd gemaine Bischoffe: Deßgleichen andere Abbt vnd Preläten, Graff vnd Herrschafften, sambt den Freyen Reichs Stetten, souil deren von alters her bey dem Reich gewest, vnd sich darzu bekent haben. Daneben auch der Geistliche Stand, als des Apostolischen Stuls zu Rom, Patriarchen, Cardinäl, Ertz vnd gemeine Bistumben, in den Königreichen Franckreich, Hispanien, Engelland, Schottland, Schweden, Dennmarck, Polland, Griechenland, sambt Italien, vnd was mehr für Christliche Königreich vnd Landschafften der Christenheit zugethan, vnd dann auch die Vniuersiteten oder Hohen Schulen inn gantz Europa, sambt derselbigen Lobsprüch vnd aigenschafften. Auß welchem allem der abgang der Christenheit dermassen für augen gestelt, daß from(m)e Christen denselben wol zu bewainen, vnd menigklich vrsach haben kan, solchen jammer vnd endlichen verderben zu behertzigen: damit die abgehackte glieder wider zu der Christenheit mögen gebracht werden: Vnd das Euangeli Christi, auf Göttliches befelchs, durch die gantze Welt, vnd an allen orten widerumb möge auffgehn vnd gepflanzet werden. Insonderheit das heilig vnd gelobte Land, darinnen Jesus Christus selbst gewandelt, seine Wunderwerck vnd sein heiliges Leiden vollbracht, alda er sein aller ehrerbietung wirdige begräbnussen hat: Welches dann die Haiden vnd Türcken jämmerlich zerrissen, vnd mit der Christen höchsten nachtheil vnd schaden, heutiges tags inhendig haben. Adam Berg, München, 1580, 283 fol.

== See also ==
- Tricking (heraldry)
