= Principality of Transylvania (1711–1867) =

Realm of Hungarian Crown and Austrian crownland

Grand Principality of Transylvania Großfürstentum Siebenbürgen (German) Erdélyi Nagyfejedelemség (Hungarian) Marele Principat al Transilvaniei (Romanian)
- 1711–1867
- Flag Coat of arms
- Capital: Hermannstadt (Nagyszeben, Sibiu) 1711–1791, 1848–1861; Klausenburg (Kolozsvár, Cluj) 1791–1848, 1861–1867
- Common languages: German; Hungarian; Romanian
- Religion: Roman Catholicism; Protestantism; Eastern Orthodoxy; Greek Catholicism
- Demonym: Transylvanian
- Monarch
  - 1711–1740 (first): Charles III
  - 1848–1867 (last): Franz Joseph I
- History
  - Rákóczi's War of Independence: 15 June 1703 – 1 May 1711
  - Peace of Szatmár: 29 April 1711
  - Massacre at Madéfalva: 7 January 1764
  - Revolt of Horea, Cloșca and Crișan: 31 October 1784 – 14 December 1784
  - Hungarian Revolution: 15 March 1848 – 4 October 1849
  - Incorporated into the Kingdom of Hungary: 29 May 1867
| Preceded by | Succeeded by |
| Principality of Transylvania (1570–1711) | Lands of the Crown of Saint Stephen |
- Today part of: Romania

The Principality of Transylvania, from 1765 the Grand Principality of Transylvania, was a realm of the Hungarian Crown ruled by the Habsburg and Habsburg-Lorraine monarchs of the Habsburg monarchy (later Austrian Empire) and mostly governed by Hungarians. After the Ottomans were ousted from most of the territories of medieval Kingdom of Hungary, and after the failure of Rákóczi's War of Independence (1703–1711), the Habsburg dynasty claimed the former territories of the Principality of Transylvania under the capacity of their title of "King of Hungary". During the Hungarian Revolution of 1848, the Hungarian government proclaimed union with Transylvania in the April Laws of 1848 (after the Transylvanian Diet's confirmation on 30 May and the king's approval on 10 June for Transylvania to become once again an integral part of Hungary). After the failure of the revolution, the March Constitution of Austria decreed that the Principality of Transylvania be a separate crown land entirely independent of Hungary. In 1867, as a result of the Austro-Hungarian Compromise, the principality was reunited with Hungary proper.

== History ==
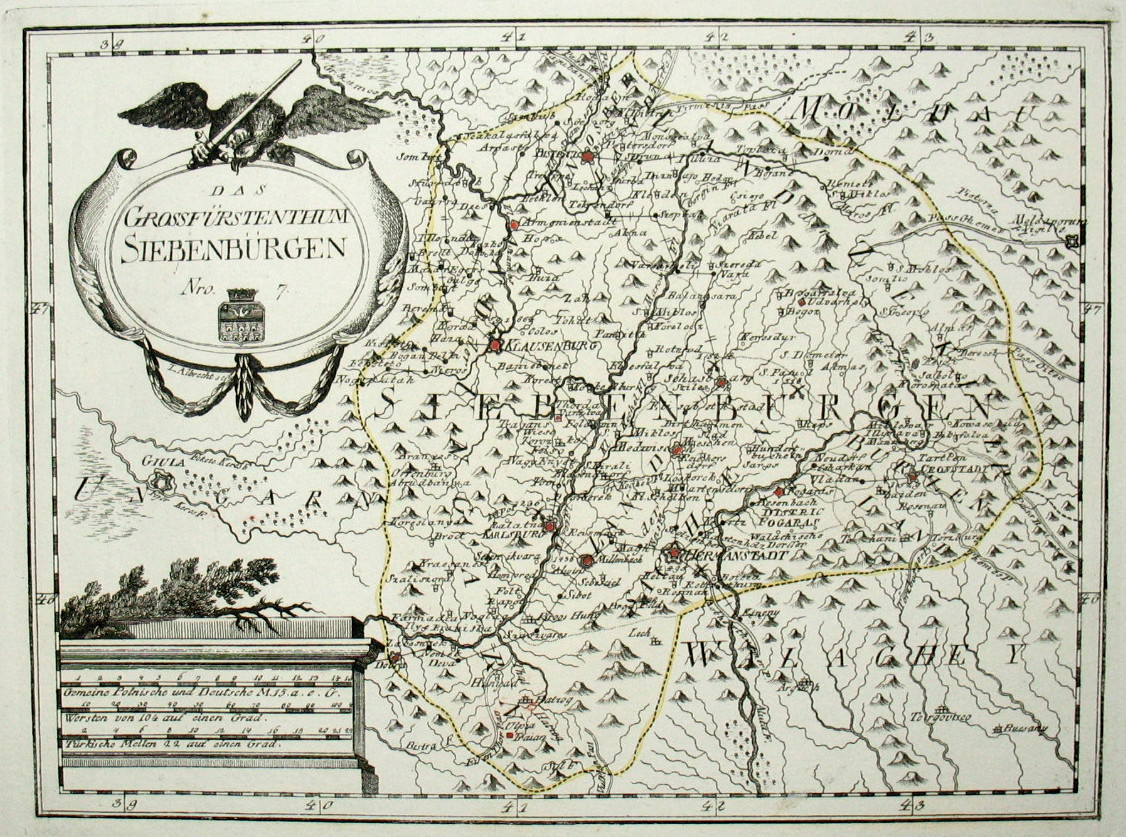
Grand Principality of Transylvania in 1791

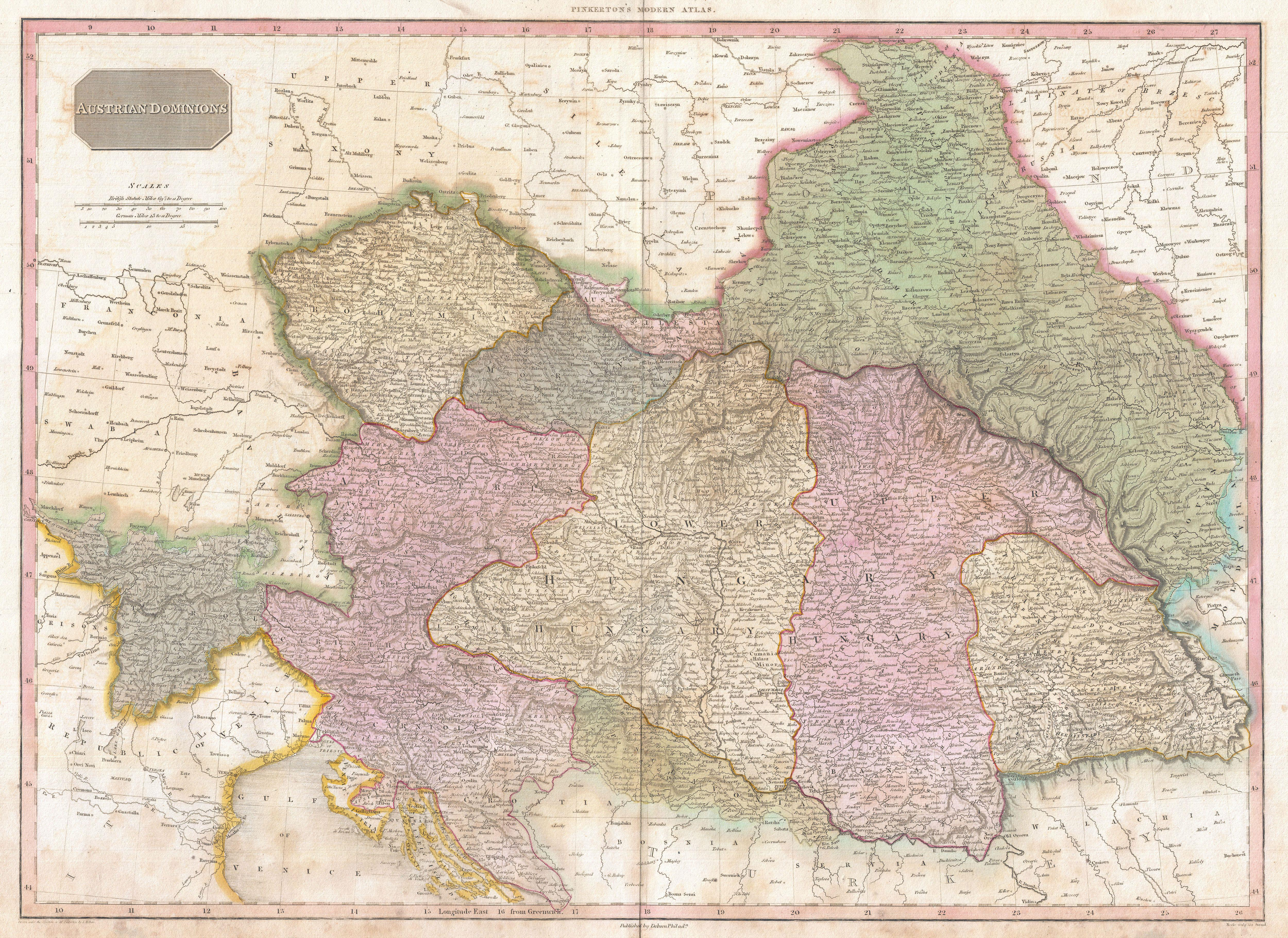
Transylvania (in yellow - right side) on a map of the military districts of the Habsburg Monarchy (1818 map showing the situation in the late 1790s)

In the Great Turkish War, the Habsburg Emperor Leopold I had occupied the vassal Ottoman Principality of Transylvania and forced Prince Michael I Apafi to acknowledge his overlordship in his capacity as King of Hungary. Upon Apafi's death in 1690, Emperor Leopold decreed the Diploma Leopoldinum, which affiliated the Transylvanian territory with the Habsburg monarchy. In 1697 Michael's son and heir Prince Michael II Apafi finally renounced Transylvania in favour of Leopold; the transfer to the Habsburg lands was confirmed by the 1699 Treaty of Karlowitz between the Holy League and the Ottoman Empire.

After Rákóczi's War of Independence had failed, the Peace of Szatmár was concluded in 1711: Habsburg control over Transylvania was consolidated, and the Princes of Transylvania were replaced with Habsburg imperial governors (Gubernatoren). In 1765 Maria Theresa and her son Emperor Joseph II proclaimed the Grand Principality of Transylvania, consolidating the special separate status of Transylvania within the Habsburg Monarchy, established by the Diploma Leopoldinum in 1691.

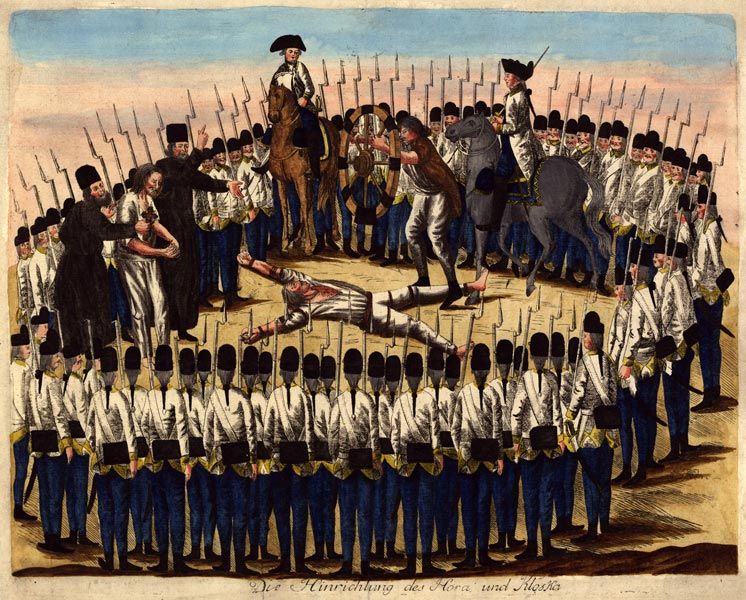
The execution of the rebel leaders Horea and Cloșca in 1785

From about 1734 onwards, southern Transylvania became the settlement area of German-speaking Transylvanian Landler expellees, Crypto-Protestants from the Habsburg hereditary lands of Upper Austria, Styria and Carinthia, who were exiled to the easternmost outpost of the Habsburg Monarchy. The area around Sibiu (Hermannstadt) had been colonized by Transylvanian Saxons since medieval times; here the Landler had to settle in regions devastated during the Great Turkish War.

The majority of the Transylvanian population was Romanian, many of them peasants working for Hungarian magnates under the precarious conditions of serfdom. The 1784 Revolt of Horea, Cloșca and Crișan, however, and all demands of political equality were of no avail.

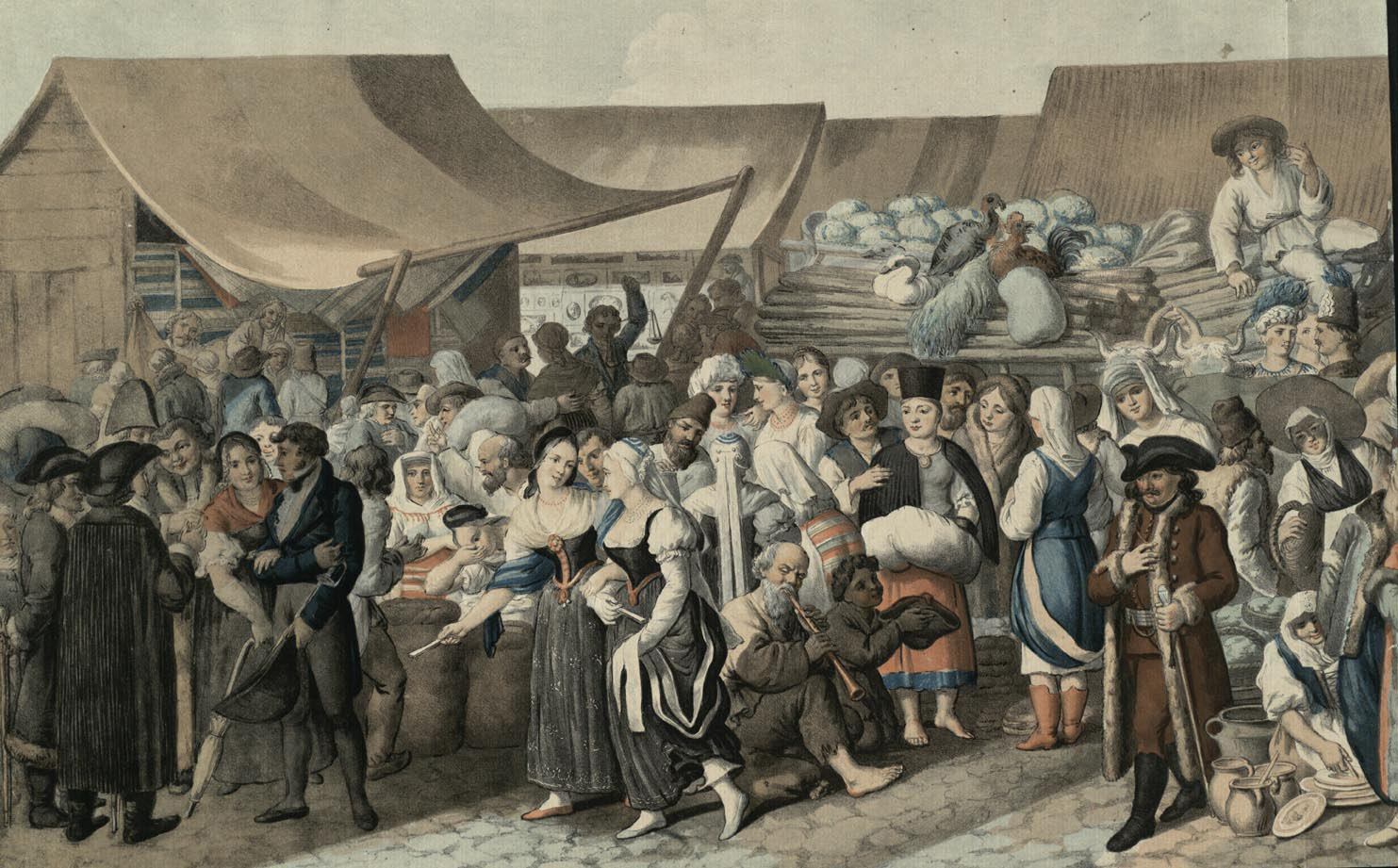
A market scene in Transylvania, 1818

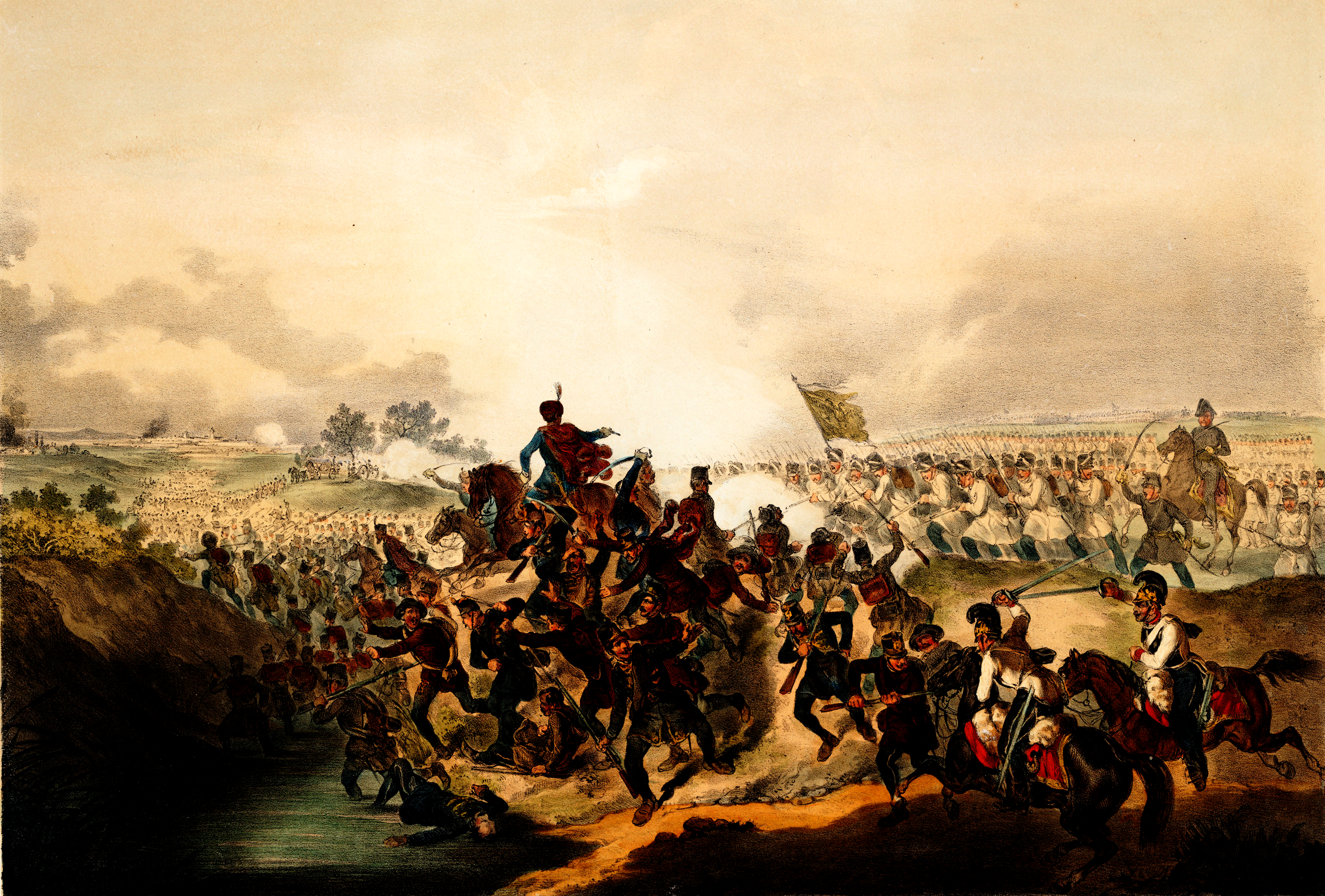
The Battle of Temesvár in August 1849

During the 1848 Revolutions, the Hungarian insurgents called for the re-unification of Transylvania with Hungary – opposed by Romanian (Wallachian) revolutionaries led by Avram Iancu and Austrian forces led by Karl von Urban – but also for the abolition of serfdom. The April Laws of 1848 proclaimed the re-unification, but after the Hungarian revolt was crushed, Transylvania remained under military administration for several years, and the March Constitution of Austria defined the Principality of Transylvania as being a separate crown land that is entirely independent of Hungary.

In 1853, the Transylvanian Military Frontier, which existed from 1762, was abolished and again incorporated into Transylvania.

The 1863-1864 Transylvanian Diet summoned in Sibiu (the first meeting of Transylvania's governing body after the 1848 Revolution) proclaimed that the Romanian nation, language, and cults (Greek Catholic and Eastern Orthodox) were to be elevated to the same rank as those of the other nations, thus granting Romanians complete equality of rights with the rest of the inhabitants of Transylvania. Also, it was on this occasion that the Romanians held the relative majority of seats in the Transylvanian Diet for the first time, following a provisional, liberal regulation (Romanians: 48 deputies for 1,300,913 inhabitants or one deputy for 28,280 people; Hungarians: 44 deputies for 568,172 inhabitants or one deputy for 12,913 people; Saxons: 33 deputies for 204,031 inhabitants or one deputy for 6,370 people).

In September 1865, the emperor, now looking for a reconciliation with the Hungarians amidst the pressing Austrian military and economic crisis, dissolved the Sibiu Diet and convened a new diet in Cluj, chosen according to a different electoral regulation, one that grossly favored the Hungarian side. On 19 November 1865, this new Transylvanian Diet voted for the affiliation with Hungary. With the subsequent Austro-Hungarian Compromise (Ausgleich), the centuries-long autonomous status of Hungarian nobility, Székelys and Transylvanian Saxons ended and the Grand Principality of Transylvania was incorporated into Hungary proper within the Dual Monarchy, codified on 6 December 1868.

Following the Compromise, on 3 May 1868, during a popular assembly attended by some 60,000 peasants from throughout Transylvania, the representatives of the Transylvanian Romanians issued the Blaj Pronouncement, a political declaration against the Hungarian system of government that did away with Transylvania's long-standing autonomy. It called for the autonomy of Transylvania, the reopening of its Diet on the basis of proportional representation, and the recognition of the laws approved by the Diet of Sibiu. It specified that Romanians did not recognise the Parliament of Hungary or its right to make laws for Transylvania. At the same time, the document expressed the principles of the passivist doctrine of refusing to recognise Hungarian institutions and boycotting the country's political life.

== Borders ==
Before its abolition in 1867, the Principality of Transylvania bordered the Habsburg Kingdom of Hungary to the northwest and west, the Habsburg Duchy of Bukovina to the northeast, the Habsburg Military Frontier to the southwest, and the United Principalities of Moldavia and Wallachia to the south and east.

== Demographics ==
| Year | Total | Romanians | Hungarians and Székelys | Germans | Notes |
|---|---|---|---|---|---|
| 1700 | ~500,000 | ~50% | ~30% | ~20% | Estimation by Benedek Jancsó |
| 1700 | ~800,000–865,000 | | | | Recent estimates |
| 1712–1713 | | 34% | 47% | 19% | Official estimate |
| 1720 | 806,221 | 49.6% | 37.2% | 12.2% | Estimation by Károly Kocsis & Eszter Kocsisné Hodosi |
| 1721 | - | 48,28% | 36.09% | 15.62% | Estimation by Ignác Acsády |
| 1730 | ~725,000 | 57.9% | 26.2% | 15.1% | Austrian statistics |
| 1765 | ~1,000,000 | 55.9% | 26% | 12% | Estimation by Bálint Hóman and Gyula Szekfü |
| 1773 | 1,066,017 | 63.5% | 24.2% | 12.3% | |
| 1784 | 1,440,986 | - | - | - | Official census |
| 1790 | 1,465,000 | 50.8% | 30.4% | - | |
| 1835 | - | 62.3% | 23.3% | 14.3% | |
| 1850 | 2,073,372 | 59.1% | 25.9% | 9.3% | |

== See also ==
- Transylvania
- List of rulers of Transylvania
- Transylvanian Saxons
- Unio Trium Nationum, pact between the three Estates of Transylvania (Hungarian nobility, Saxon patricians, and free Székelys), which endured into the 19th century
