= Levinus Hulsius =

Flemish instrument maker (1550–1606)

- Born: 1550; Ghent
- Died: 13 March 1606; Frankfurt
- Occupations: Writer, publisher, instrument maker, notary, printer

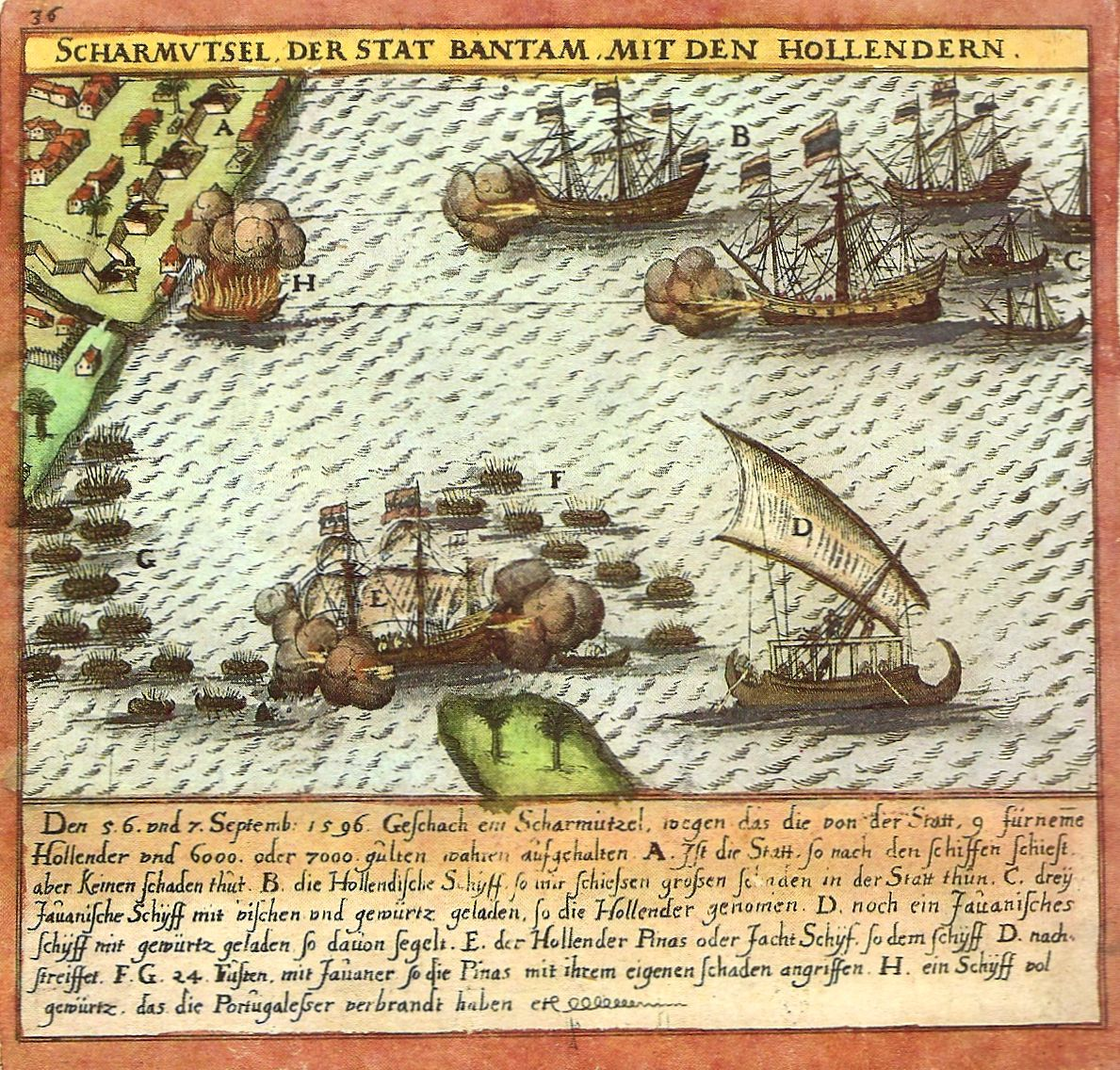
Print by Levinus Hulsius, 1596

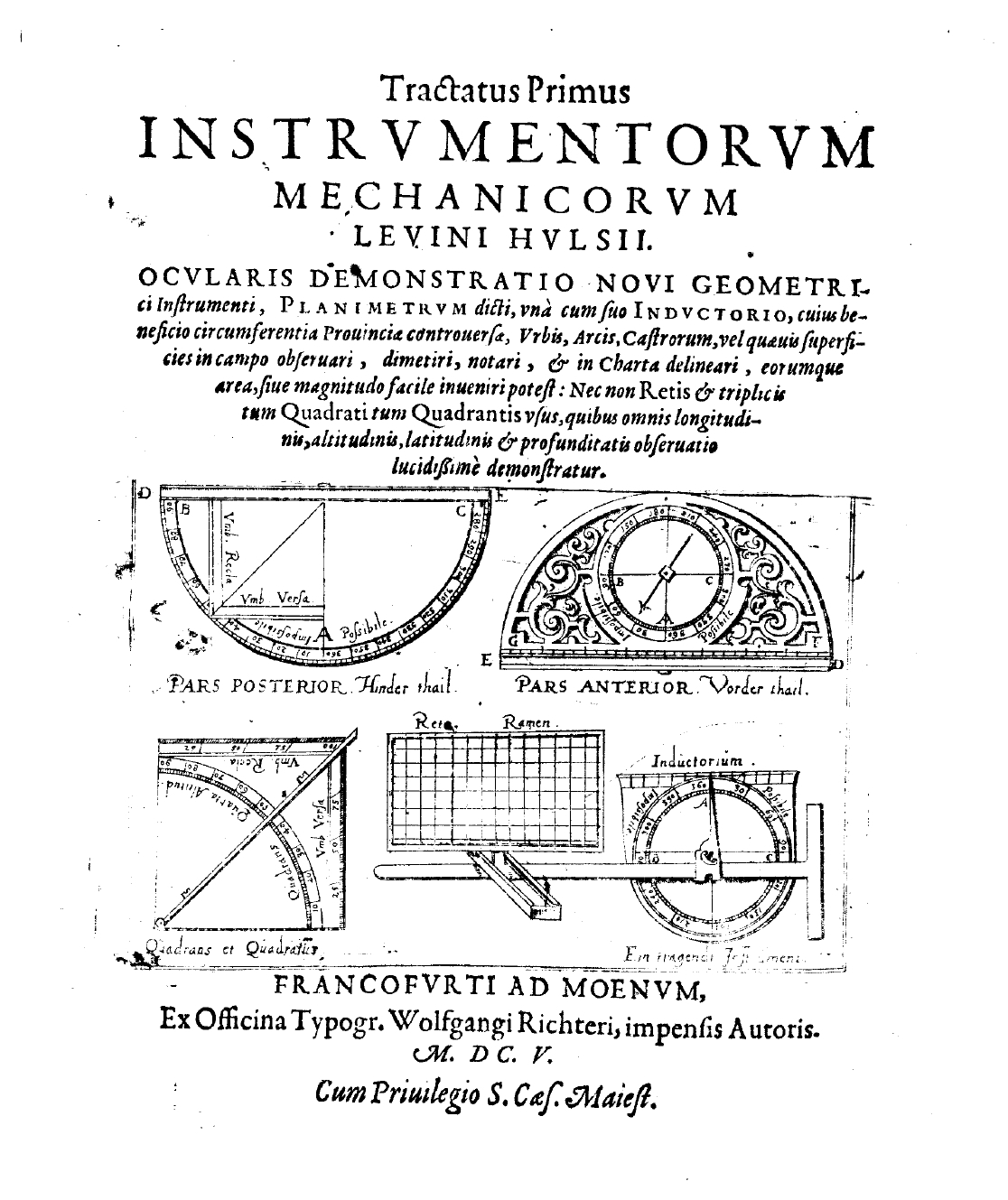
Tractatus instrumentorum mechanicorum, 1605

Levinus Hulsius (1550 – 13 March 1606) was a Flemish maker and dealer of fine scientific instruments, as well as a publisher, printer, linguist, lexicographer, notary, and writer. He wrote extensively on the construction of geometrical instruments. Although he was born in Flanders, he lived and worked in the Dutch Republic and the Holy Roman Empire.

== Works ==
- Tractatus instrumentorum mechanicorum (in Latin). Vol. 1. Frankfurt: Wolfgang Richter. 1605.
- Tractatus instrumentorum mechanicorum (in Latin). Vol. 2. Frankfurt: Wolfgang Richter. 1605.
- Tractatus instrumentorum mechanicorum (in Latin). Vol. 3. Frankfurt: Wolfgang Richter. 1605.

== Sources ==
- F.X. de Feller (1818). "HULSIUS (Levinus)". Dictionnaire historique, ou Histoire abrégée (in French). Vol. 4. Paris & Lyon. p. 675.
- Georg Wolfgang Karl Lochner (1881). "Hulsius, Levin" . Allgemeine Deutsche Biographie (in German). Vol. 13. Leipzig: Duncker & Humblot. p. 335.
- Josef Benzing (1974). "Hulsius (van Hülsen), Levin". Neue Deutsche Biographie (in German). Vol. 10. Berlin: Duncker & Humblot. p. 30. (full text online).
- Mathematics from the birth of numbers, Jan Gullberg, W. W. Norton & Company; 1st ed edition (October 1997), 1093 pages ISBN 0-393-04002-X ISBN 978-0-393-04002-9
- Ralf Kern: "Wissenschaftliche Instrumente in Ihrer Zeit". Band 2: "Vom Compendium zum Einzelinstrument". Verlag der Buchhandlung Walther König 2010, ISBN 978-3-86560-866-6
