= Șumuleu Ciuc =

Șumuleu Ciuc Csíksomlyó
- neighborhood
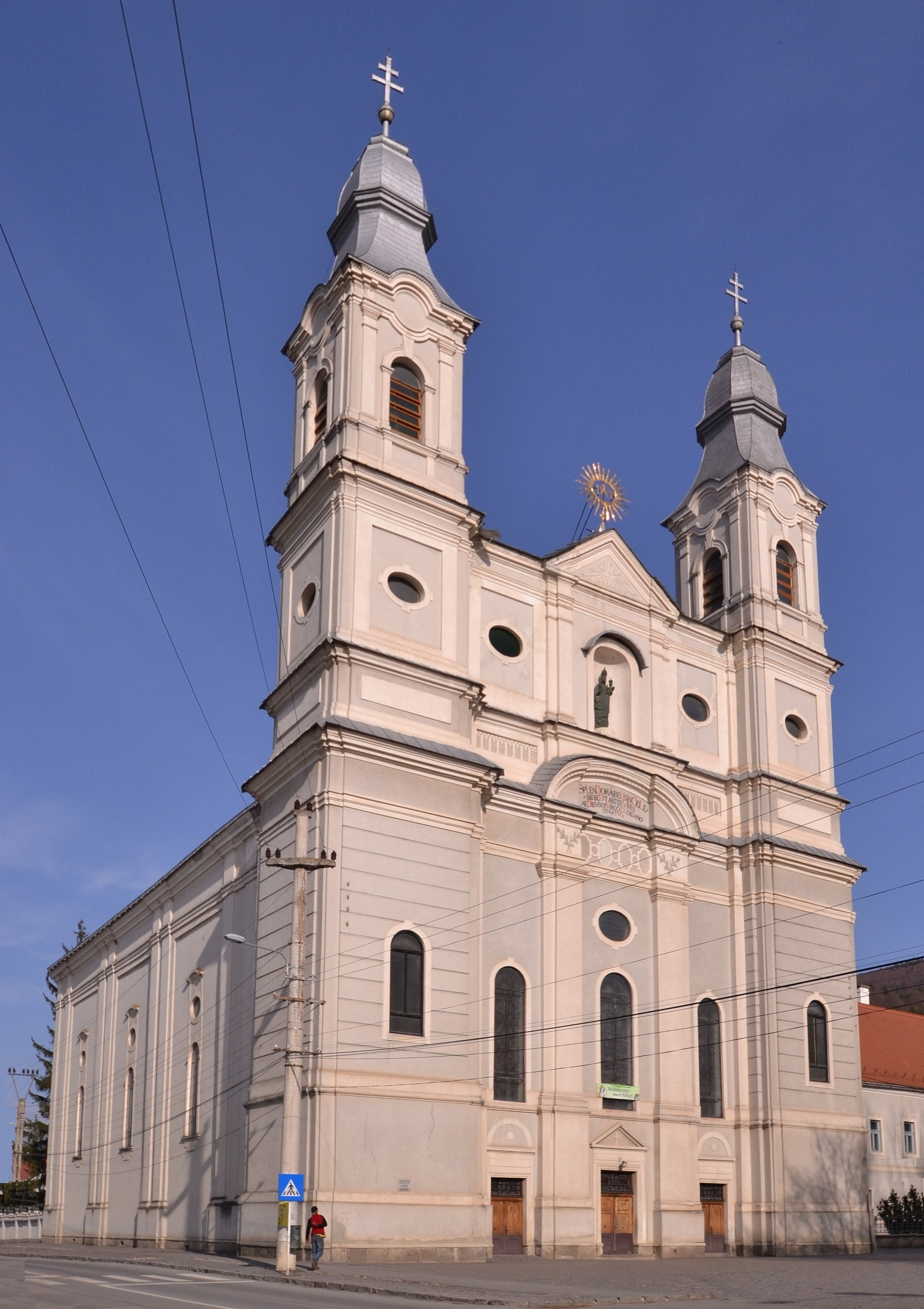
- The Franciscan Church

- Location within Romania
- Coordinates: 46°22′43″N 25°49′31″E
- Country: Romania
- County: Harghita County
- Status: neighborhood
- Time zone: UTC+2 (EET)
  - Summer (DST): UTC+3 (EEST)
- Postal Code: 530202
- Area code: +40 266
- Website: www.csiksomlyo.ro

Șumuleu Ciuc (Hungarian: Csíksomlyó, pronounced [ˈt͡ʃiːkʃomjoː]) is a neighbourhood in the city of Miercurea Ciuc, Harghita County, Romania. Until 1959, it was a separate commune. It is the site of an annual Roman Catholic pilgrimage, when Catholics from all over Hungary, Slovakia and Romania gather there.

== Location ==
It lies in eastern Transylvania, 3 km north-east from the center of Miercurea Ciuc, on the banks of the Șumuleu brook.

== History ==
The settlement was first recorded in 1333, when a sacerdos de Sumbov was mentioned. A year later it was mentioned as Sumlov, in 1444 as Somlyo. The village name Csíksomlyó was given in 1913 when Csíksomlyó-Várdotfalva and Csobotfalva (Romanian: Cioboteni) villages were unified. Originally it designated the mountain in the neighborhood of the Franciscan monastery. According to historian Losteiner, the village had its own church and monastery as early as 1208.

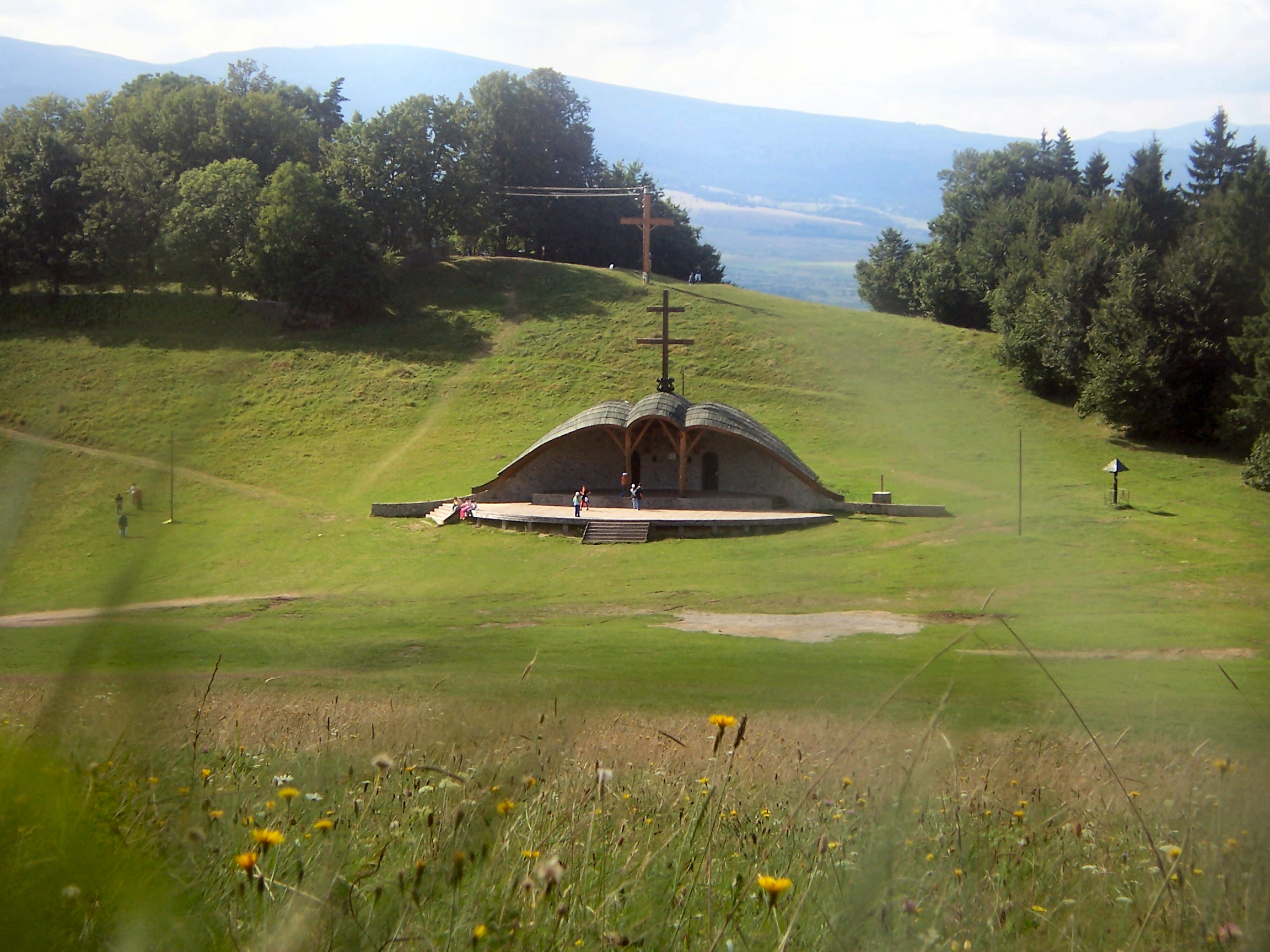
The Three Hill Altar on the "Saddle" used for celebrating the mass for the pilgrims

Its Franciscan monastery was founded in 1442 by John Hunyadi, future governor of Hungary (1446–1452), mighty defender of Hungary against the Ottoman invasion, to commemorate his victory over the Turkish troops at Sibiu. The church and the monastery did not avoid the devastations of history. In 1553, Wallachian voivode Pătrașcu the Good and his son Ioan Vodă cel Cumplit cracked down on the village spreading havoc; in 1600, Habsburg general Basta raided Csíkszék; but the deadliest attack came in 1661, when the Tartars set the church, monastery and the school on fire destroying them. The next Tartar raid of 1694 was beaten back by well-prepared troops, even counting women within its lines.

Following the authorization by the pope in 1667, the secondary grammar school Csíksomlyó opened its gates in 1668. Among the founders of the grammar school was Johannes Caioni (1629–1687), who was an architect, composer, organ builder and player, historian, and printer. He established the printery of Csíksomlyó (the first printery in the Székely Land) and printed the first book in 1675 titled Cantionale Catholicum, which was a psalm-book.

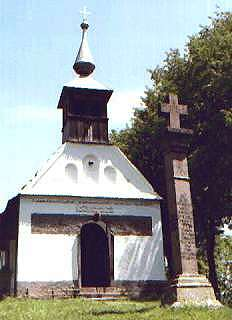
The Salvator-chapel

The grammar school was run by the monks of the Franciscan begging order, but because of the important cultural, ethnographical, architectural, and artistic, etc., achievements they have made, the monastery school received donations from political leader and high-nobles, as their sigh of appreciation. Even Basta, the Habsburg general donated wealth, and during his raids, he managed to avoid causing damage to the monks here. The largest donations were from Hungarian Gabriel Bethlen in 1616, George I Rákóczi, in 1649, Ákos Barcsay in 1659, and Michael I Apafi in 1662. As a result, the Franciscan monks were able to establish such an educational, cultural, and artistic center in the Grammar School of Csíksomlyó, that has become comparable to the levels of other schools of the same kind in Western Europe.

The present church's construction started in 1802 in late baroque style and the construction procedure with the interiors lasted 72 years. The foundation of the old monastery founded by John Hunyadi was used to erect the new building. The two-tower church has a 12-meter-high aisle which hosts magnificent paintings by Italian and Hungarian painters; the organ, re-built by Johannes Caioni, and the wooden-sculpture figure of the Virgin Mary, known as the Weeping Mary, in the main altar both count for a masterpiece. One of the church's bells is 1,133 kg.

The village administratively belonged to Csíkszék, then, from 1876 until 1918 to the Csík County of the Kingdom of Hungary. In 1920, Șumuleu Ciuc, like the rest of Transylvania, formally passed with the Treaty of Trianon from Hungarian to Romanian control. The region passed again to Hungary with the 1940 Treaty of the Belvedere (also known as the Second Vienna Award). After World War II, it came under Romanian administration and became part of Romania in 1947. Between 1952 and 1960, it formed part of the Hungarian Autonomous Province, then, of the Mureș-Hungarian Autonomous Province until it was abolished in 1968. After that, the commune was part of Harghita County until being incorporated into Miercurea Ciuc.

== Pentecost Pilgrimage ==
Csíksomlyó became a pilgrimage site in 1567, when Hungarian king John II Sigismund Zápolya wanted to convert the Székely population of the upper Csík to Protestantism. The Székelys refused to abandon the Catholic faith and resisted. A battle took place on a nearby field, on Saturday before Pentecost 1567, from which the Székelys emerged victorious. The monks saw this as a sign of the care of Virgin Mary, and since then, this event has been commemorated by a pilgrimage when the believers gather on Pentecost every year. Beside its religious importance, the pilgrimage has also become a community event demonstrating spiritual unity of Hungarian people living in and outside the historical region of Transylvania.
