= Mijloc =

Mijloc may refer to:

- Chiuruţul de Mijloc River, tributary of the Lăzarea River in Romania
- Jora de Mijloc, commune in Orhei district, Moldova
- Latoriţa de Mijloc River or Muncelu River or Muntinu River, a tributary of the Latoriţa River in Romania
- Sărăcinul de Mijloc River, tributary of the Lotru River in Romania
- Valea din Mijloc River, headwater of the Bistra River in Romania
