= Șumuleu River =

Șumuleu River may refer to:

- Șumuleu, a tributary of the Putna in Harghita County
- Șumuleu, a tributary of the Pustnic in Harghita County
