= Golden Rose =

Papal award

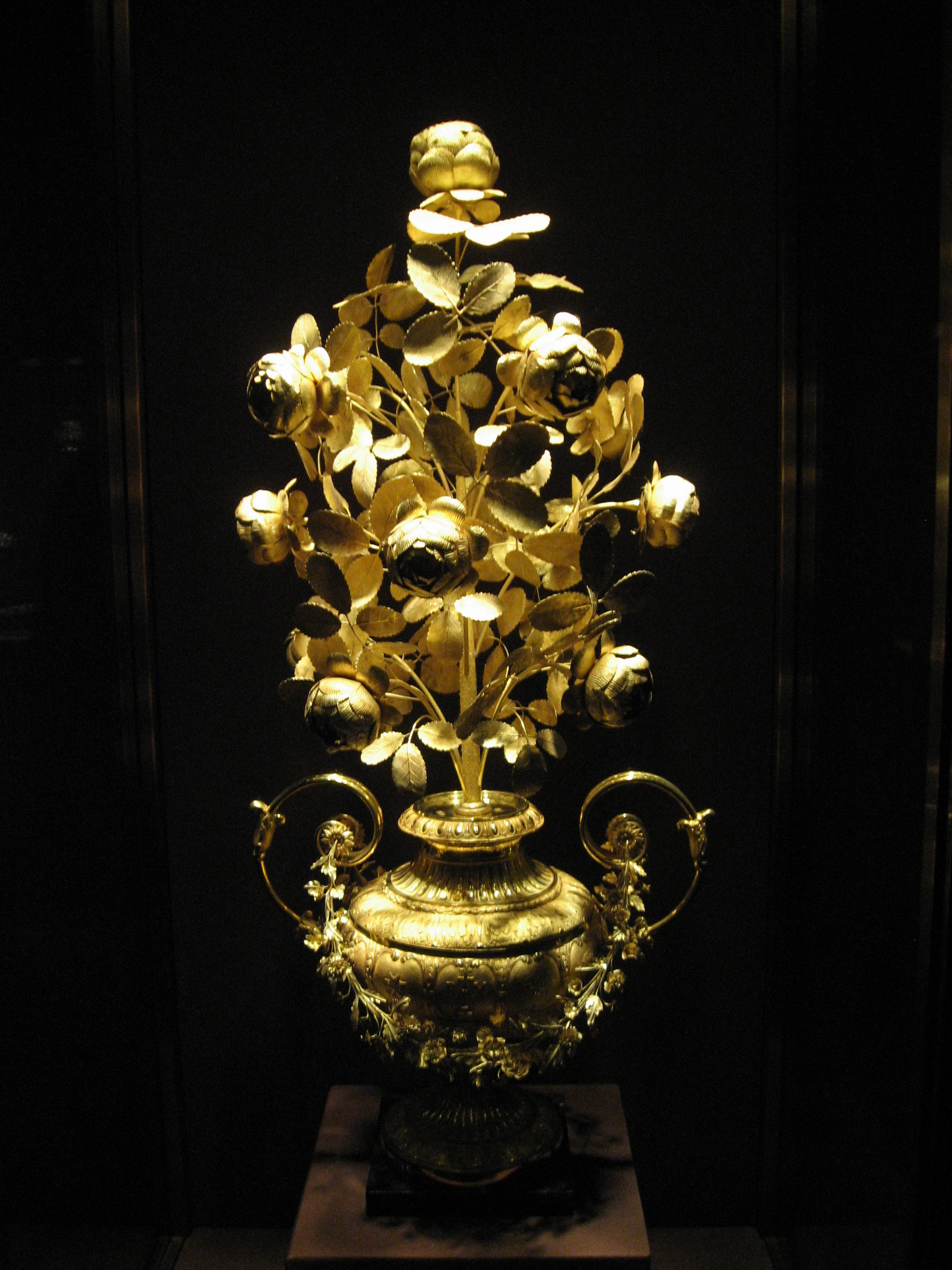
Golden Rose by Giuseppe and Pietro Paolo Spagna. Rome, around 1818/19. Kept today in the Imperial Treasury in Hofburg Imperial Palace in Vienna.

The Golden Rose (Latin: Rosa aurea, Italian: Rosa d'oro) is a gold ornament, which popes of the Catholic Church have traditionally blessed annually. It is occasionally conferred as a token of reverence or affection. Recipients have included churches and sanctuaries, royalty, military figures, and governments.

== Significance and symbolism ==
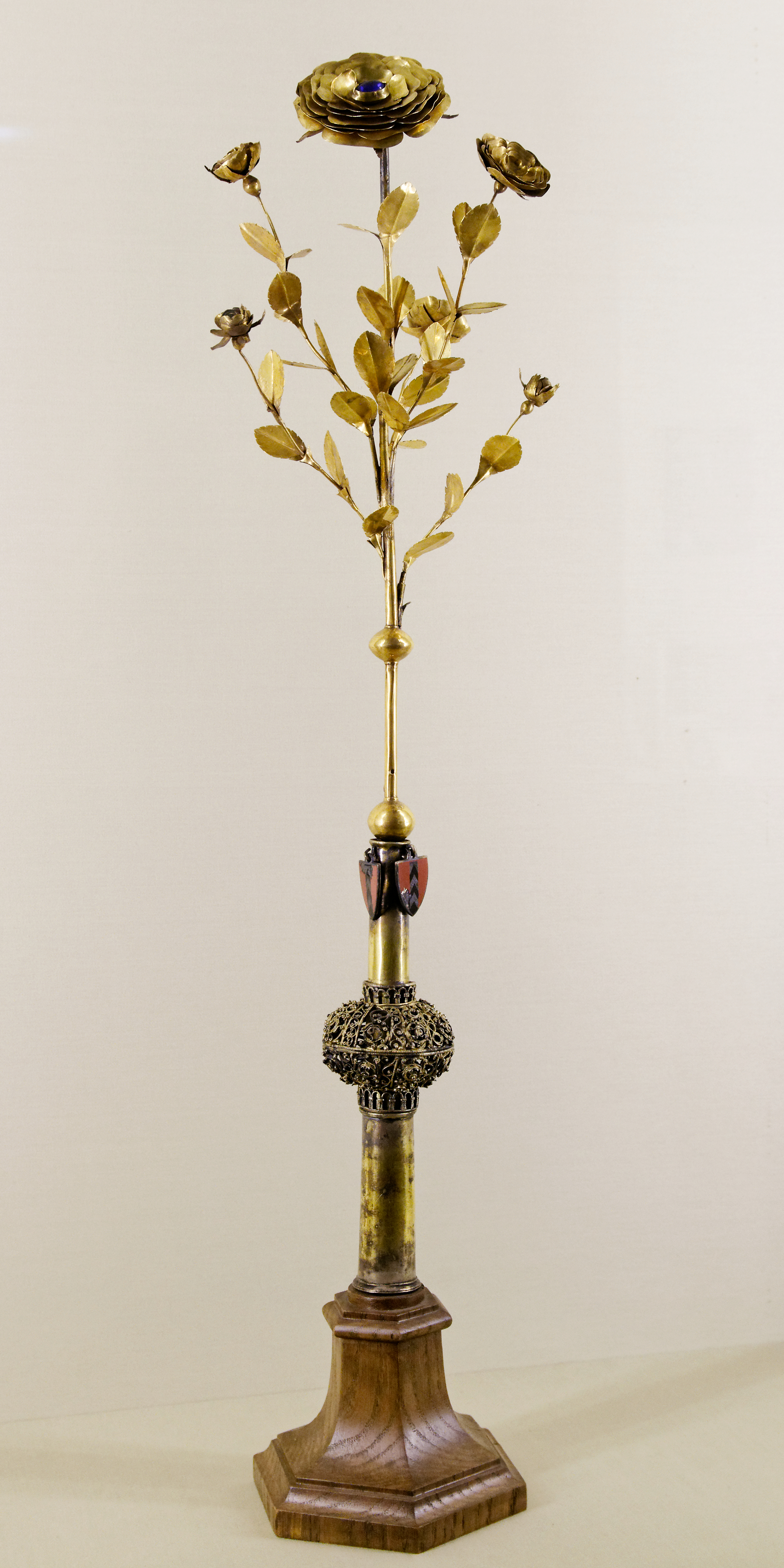
Golden Rose of Minucchio da Siena (1330), given by Pope John XXII to Rudolph III of Nidau, Count of Neuchâtel

The rose is blessed on the fourth Sunday of Lent, Lætare Sunday (also known as Rose Sunday), when rose-coloured vestments and draperies substitute for the penitential purple, symbolizing hope and joy in the midst of Lenten solemnity. The Golden Rose symbolizes the Risen Christ. The rose's fragrance, according to Pope Leo XIII, "shows the sweet odor of Christ which should be widely diffused by His faithful followers" (Acta, vol. VI, 104), and the thorns and red tint of the petals refer to His bloody Passion. Innocent III said: "As Lætare Sunday, the day set apart for the function, represents love after hate, joy after sorrow, and fullness after hunger, so does the rose designate by its colour, odour and taste, love, joy and satiety respectively."

== Workmanship ==
Before the pontificate of Sixtus IV (1471–1484) the Golden Rose consisted of a single blossom made of pure gold and slightly tinted with red. Later, to embellish the ornament, the gold was left untinted but rubies and afterwards many precious gems were placed in the heart of the rose or on its petals.

Pope Sixtus IV substituted in place of the single rose a thorny branch with leaves and many (ten or more) roses, the largest of which sprang from the top of the branch with smaller roses clustering around it. In the center of the principal rose was a tiny cup with a perforated cover, into which the pope poured musk and balsam to bless the rose. The whole ornament was of pure gold. This 'Sistine' design was maintained but varied as to decoration, size, weight and value. Originally it was little over three inches in height, and was easily carried in the Pope's left hand as he blessed the multitude with his right hand, when passing in procession from the church of Santa Croce in Gerusalemme (in Rome) to the Lateran Palace. Afterwards, especially when a vase and large pedestal became part of the ornament, a robust cleric was required to carry it, preceding the papal cross in the procession. The rose sent to Wilhelmina Amalia of Brunswick, wife of Joseph I, afterwards emperor, by Innocent XI, weighed 20 pounds (9.1 kg) and was almost 18 inches (460 mm) high. It was in bouquet form, with three twisting branches that came together after many windings at the top of the stem, supporting a large rose and cluster of leaves.

The vase and the pedestal supporting it have varied as to material, weight, and form. In the beginning they were made of gold; but afterward of silver heavily gilt with gold. The pedestal can be either triangular, quadrangular, or octangular, and is richly ornamented with various decorations and bas-reliefs. In addition to the customary inscription, the coat of arms of the pope who had the ornament made, and that of he who blessed and conferred it, are engraved on the pedestal.

=== Value of the ornament ===
The value of the rose varies according to the munificence of the pontiffs or the economic circumstances of the times.

Baldassari (1709) stated that the rose conferred about the year 1650 cost about 500 scudi d'oro (equivalent of about 1.7 kg (3.7 lb) of gold). The two roses sent by Pope Alexander VII were valued at about 800 and 1200 scudi respectively. Pope Clement IX sent the Queen of France one costing about 1600 scudi, made of 8 lb (3.6 kg) of gold. The workmanship on this rose was exceedingly fine, for which the artificer received the equivalent of 300 scudi. Innocent XI caused 7.5 lb (3.4 kg) of gold to be formed into a rose, which was further embellished with many sapphires, costing in all 1450 scudi.

Rock (1909) adds that in the 19th century not a few of the roses cost 2000 scudi and more.

== Origin ==
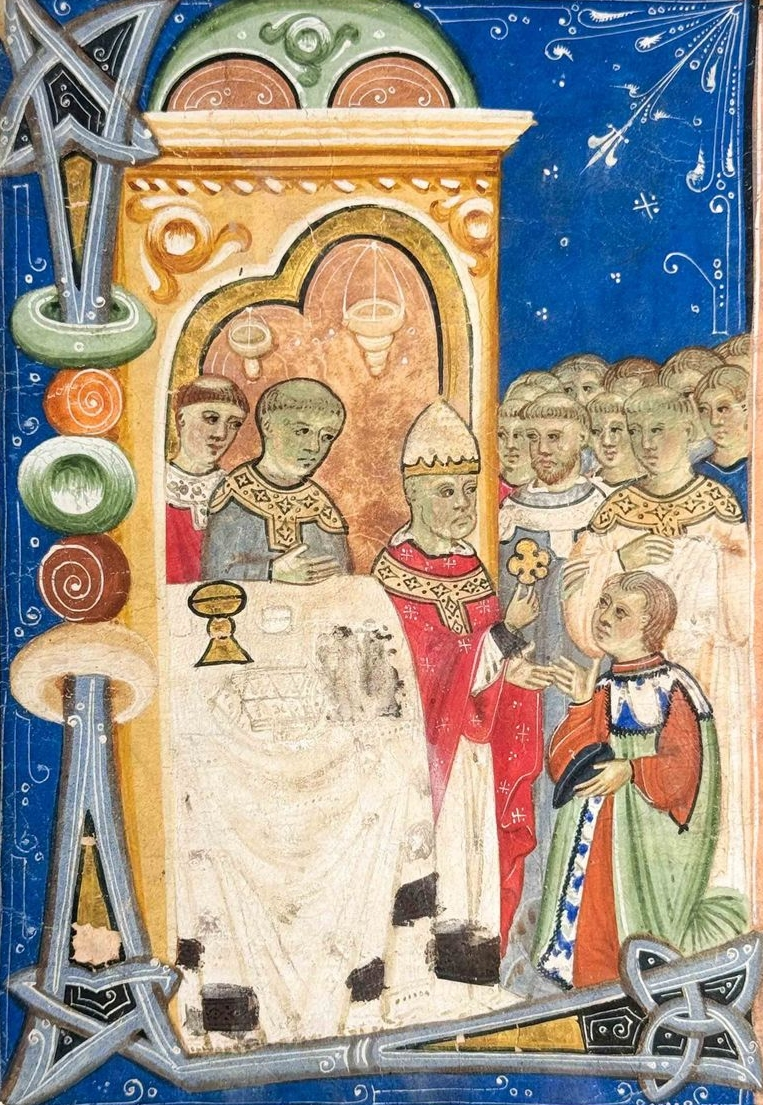
A pope is giving the golden rose to a kneeling layman, scene from an illuminated manuscript, Rome or Bologna, c. 1280-1300

The custom of giving the rose supplanted the ancient practice of sending Catholic rulers the Golden Keys from St. Peter's Confessional, a custom introduced either by Pope Gregory II (716) or Pope Gregory III (740). A certain analogy exists between the rose and the keys: both are of pure gold blessed and bestowed by the pope upon illustrious Catholics, and also, both are somewhat reminiscent of a reliquary—the rose contains musk and balsam, the keys are filings from the Chair of St. Peter.

The exact date of the institution of the rose is unknown. According to some it is anterior to Charlemagne (742–814), according to others it had its origin at the end of the 12th century, but it certainly antedates the year 1050, since Pope Leo IX (1051) speaks of the rose as of an ancient institution at his time.

The custom, started when the popes moved to Avignon, of conferring the rose upon the most deserving prince at the papal court, continued after the papacy moved back to Rome. The prince would receive the rose from the pope in a solemn ceremony and be accompanied by the College of Cardinals from the papal palace to his residence. From the beginning of the seventeenth century, the rose was sent only to queens, princesses and eminent noblemen. Emperors, kings and princes were given a blessed sword and hat as a more suitable gift. However, if a deserving Catholic emperor, king or other great prince was present in Rome on Lætare Sunday, he would be presented with the rose.

The office of carrying and conferring the rose upon those living outside of Rome was given by the pope to cardinal legates a latere, nuncios, inter-nuncios and Apostolic ablegates. In 1895 a new office, called "Bearer of the Golden Rose" or "Keeper of the Golden Rose", destined for Members of Royal Houses (not hereditary), was instituted, and assigned to a privy chamberlain of sword and cape de numero participantium, a rank within the Papal Household, but it was abolished in a series of reforms in 1968 by Pope Paul VI.

== Blessing of the Rose ==
The earliest roses were not blessed; instead, blessing was introduced to render the ceremony more solemn and induce greater reverence for it on the part of the recipient. According to Cardinal Petra (Comment. in Constit. Apostolicas, III, 2, col. 1), Pope Innocent IV (1245–54) was the first to bless it. However, others claim that Pope Innocent III (1198–1216), Pope Alexander III (1159–81) or Pope Leo IX (1049–55) was the first. It is said that Leo IX, in 1051, obliged the monastery (nuns) of Bamberg in Franconia, to furnish a Golden Rose to be blessed and carried on Laetare Sunday each year (Theop. Raynaud, De rosa mediana a pontifice consecrata, IV, 413). Pope Benedict XIV attests that the ceremony of blessing originated at the end of the 14th or the beginning of the 15th century. Catalanus, papal master of ceremonies, believes that even the earliest roses were anointed with musk and balsam, but the blessing with prayers, incense, and holy water had its inception later on, sometime before pontificate of Pope Julius II (1503–13). Currently, the pope blesses the rose every year, but it is not always a new and different rose; the old one is used until it has been given away.

Originally (before the papacy moved to Avignon) the rose was blessed in the Hall of Vestments (sacristy) in the palace where the pope was; but the solemn Mass and the donation of the rose took place in the Santa Croce in Gerusalemme (a figure, according to Pope Innocent III, of the heavenly Jerusalem). The blessing was followed by a solemn Mass sung either by the pope himself or the first Cardinal Priest. In the former case the rose was placed on a veil of rose-colored silk richly embroidered with gold; in the latter the pope held the rose in his hand, except while kneeling, or during the Introit, Confiteor, Elevation and the singing of "Laudemus in Domino". Rose in hand, the pope returned processionally to the Lateran Palace; the Prefect of Rome led his horse by the bridle and aided him in dismounting. Upon arrival, he gave the rose to the Prefect, as a recompense for these acts of respect and homage. Before 1305, the rose was given in Rome to no foreigner, except to the Emperor on the day of his coronation. While residing at Avignon (1305–1375), the popes, unable to visit Roman churches and basilicas, performed many of their sacred functions, among them the blessing of the rose, in the private chapel of their palace (whence the origin of the Cappella Pontificia). On their return to Rome they (Sixtus V excepted) retained this custom.

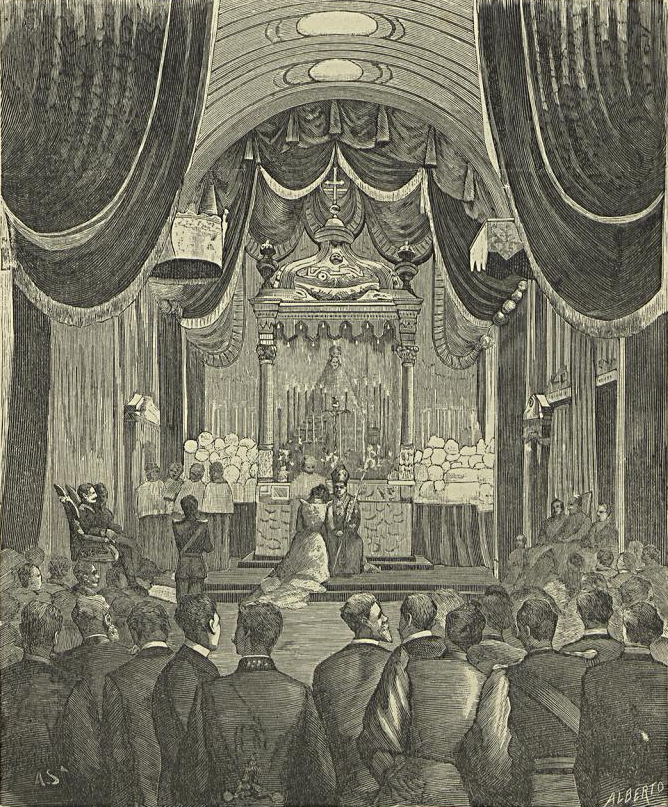
The Golden Rose is presented by Archbishop Domenico Maria Jacobini to Amélie of Orléans, Queen of Portugal, at Necessidades Palace, 1892

The blessing of the rose now takes place in the Hall of Vestments (camera dei parimenti), and the solemn Mass in the papal chapel. The rose is placed on a table with lighted candles, and the pope, vested in alb and rose-colored stole and cope with precious mitre on his head, begins the ceremony with the usual versicles and the following poetical prayer:

"O God! by Whose word and power all things have been created, by Whose will all things are directed, we humbly beseech Thy Majesty, Who art the joy and gladness of all the faithful, that Thou wouldst deign in Thy fatherly love to bless and sanctify this rose, most delightful in odour and appearance, which we this day carry in sign of spiritual joy, in order that the people consecrated by Thee and delivered from the yoke of Babylonian slavery through the favour of Thine only-begotten Son, Who is the glory and exultation of the people of Israel and of that Jerusalem which is our Heavenly mother, may with sincere hearts show forth their joy. Wherefore, O Lord, on this day, when the Church exults in Thy name and manifests her joy by this sign [the rose], confer upon us through her true and perfect joy and accepting her devotion of today; do Thou remit sin, strengthen faith, increase piety, protect her in Thy mercy, drive away all things adverse to her and make her ways safe and prosperous, so that Thy Church, as the fruit of good works, may unite in giving forth the perfume of the ointment of that flower sprung from the root of Jesse and which is the mystical flower of the field and lily of the valleys, and remain happy without end in eternal glory together with all the saints."

The prayer finished, the pope puts incense (handed by the cardinal-deacon) into the censer and incenses the balsam and then the musk, and afterwards puts the balsam and powdered musk into the tiny cup in the heart of the principal rose. He then incenses the rose and sprinkles it with holy water. It is then given to the youngest cleric of the Camera, who carries it in front of the pope to the chapel, where it is placed on the altar at the foot of the cross upon a richly embroidered silk veil, where it remains during the Mass sung by the first cardinal-priest. After the Mass, the rose is carried in procession before the pope to the sacristy, where it is carefully put away in a place set apart for it, until bestowed upon some worthy personage.

== Recipients ==
Golden Roses have been awarded to people – men, women, and one married couple – as well as to states and churches.

Until the sixteenth century Golden Roses were usually awarded to male sovereigns. From the sixteenth century onwards it became more common to award them to female sovereigns and to the wives of sovereigns. The last male to receive a Golden Rose was Francesco Loredan, Doge of Venice, in 1759. The last person to receive a Golden Rose was Grand Duchess Charlotte of Luxembourg, in 1956.

Among the principal churches to which the rose has been presented are St. Peter's Basilica (five roses), the Archbasilica of Saint John Lateran (four roses), the Sanctuary of Our Lady of Fátima (four roses), the Basilica of Our Lady Aparecida (three roses), the Sanctuary of Our Lady of Lourdes (three roses) and the Basilica di Santa Maria Maggiore (two roses).

- In the twentieth century Pius X, Benedict XV, John XXIII, and John Paul I made no awards of the Golden Rose.
- Pius XI revived the practice which was continued by Pius XII.
- Paul VI (1963–1978) made five awards.
- John Paul II (1978–2005) made ten awards.
- Benedict XVI (2005–2013) made nineteen awards.
- Francis (2013–2025) made sixteen awards.
- Leo XIV (2025–) has made ten awards.
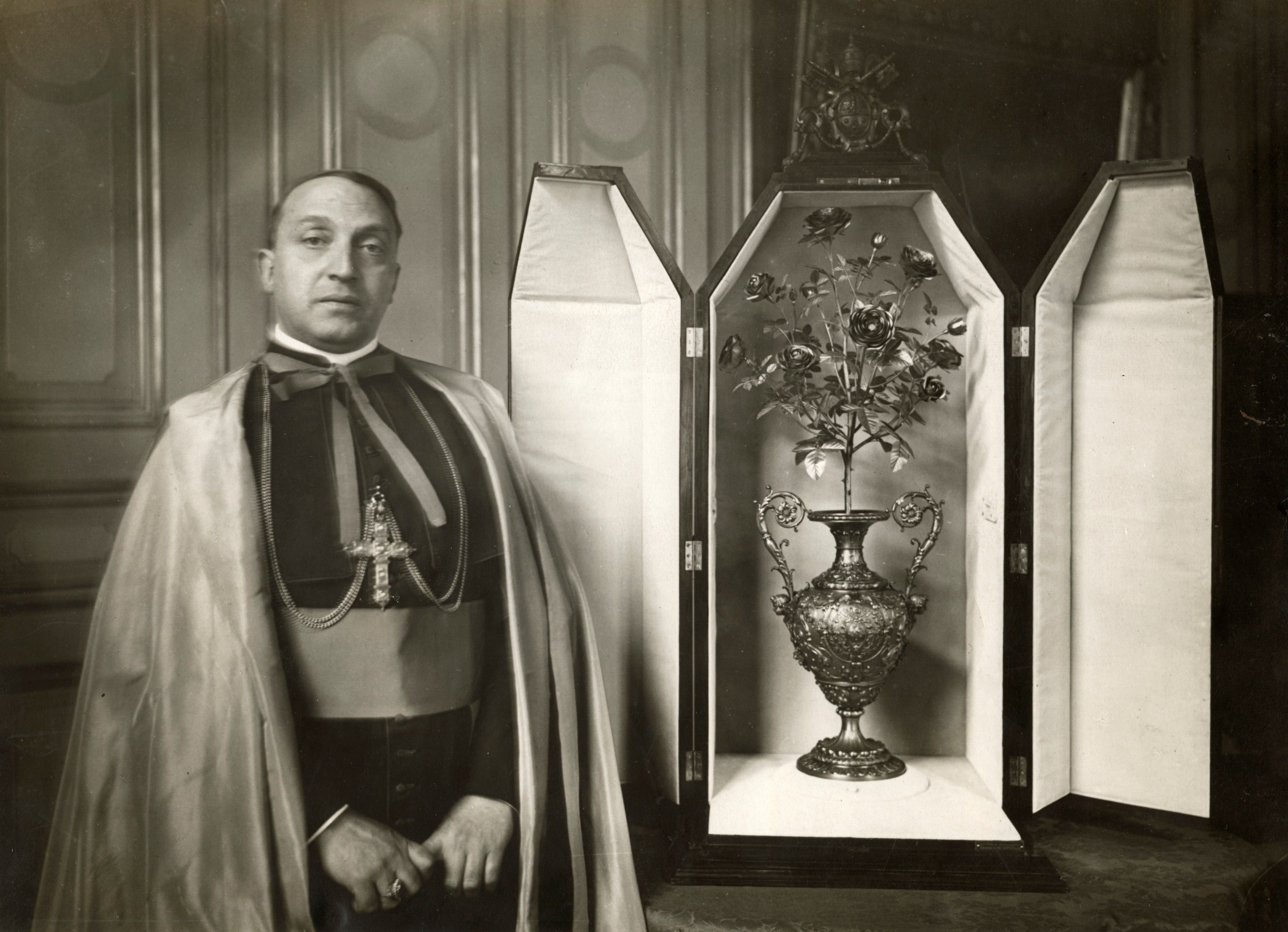
The Pope sent Queen Elisabeth of the Belgians a Golden Rose, given by Mgr. Micare during an audiënce.

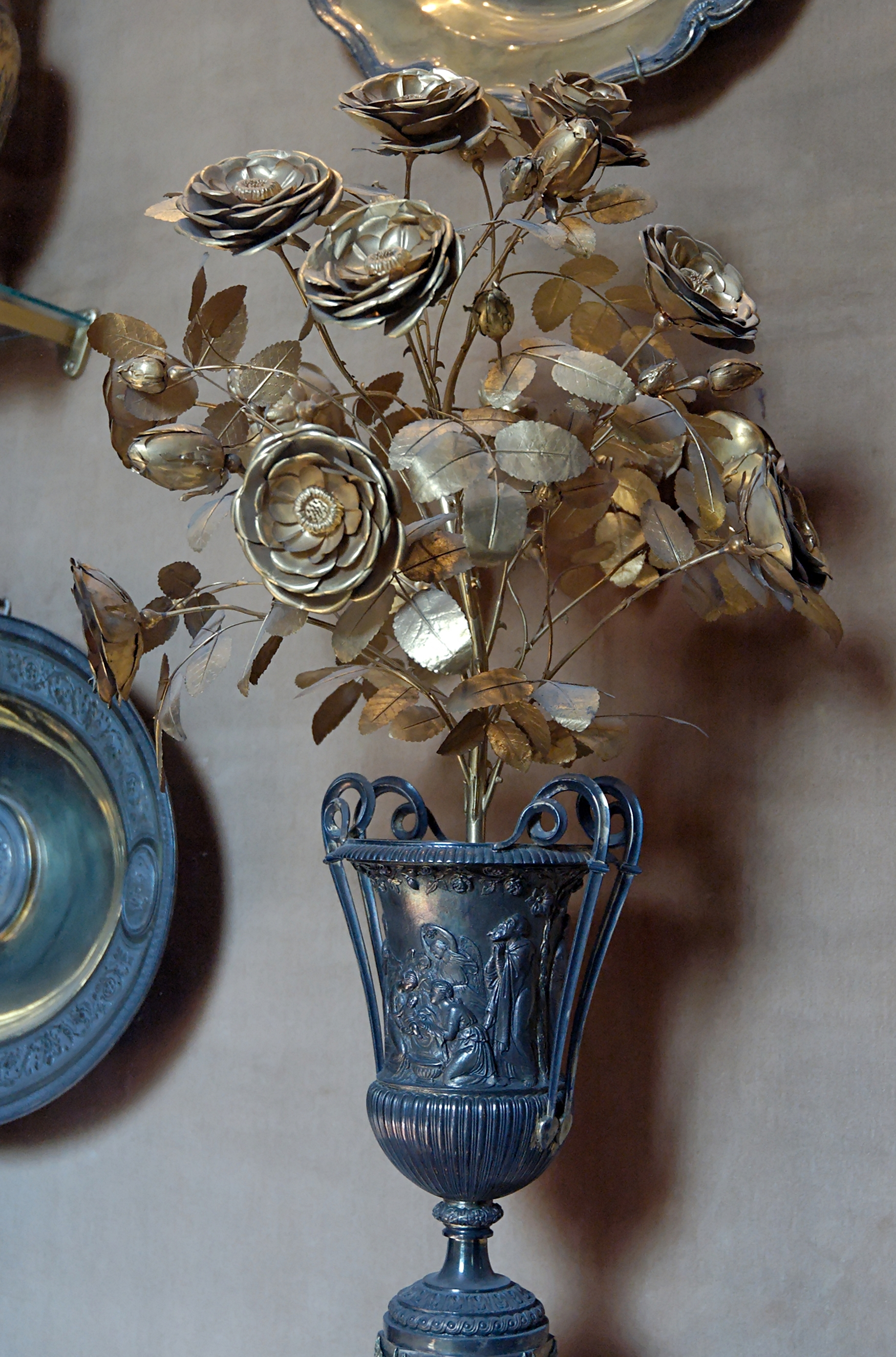
Golden Rose from the Vatican Library. Created by Giuseppe Salvi in 1868–1870

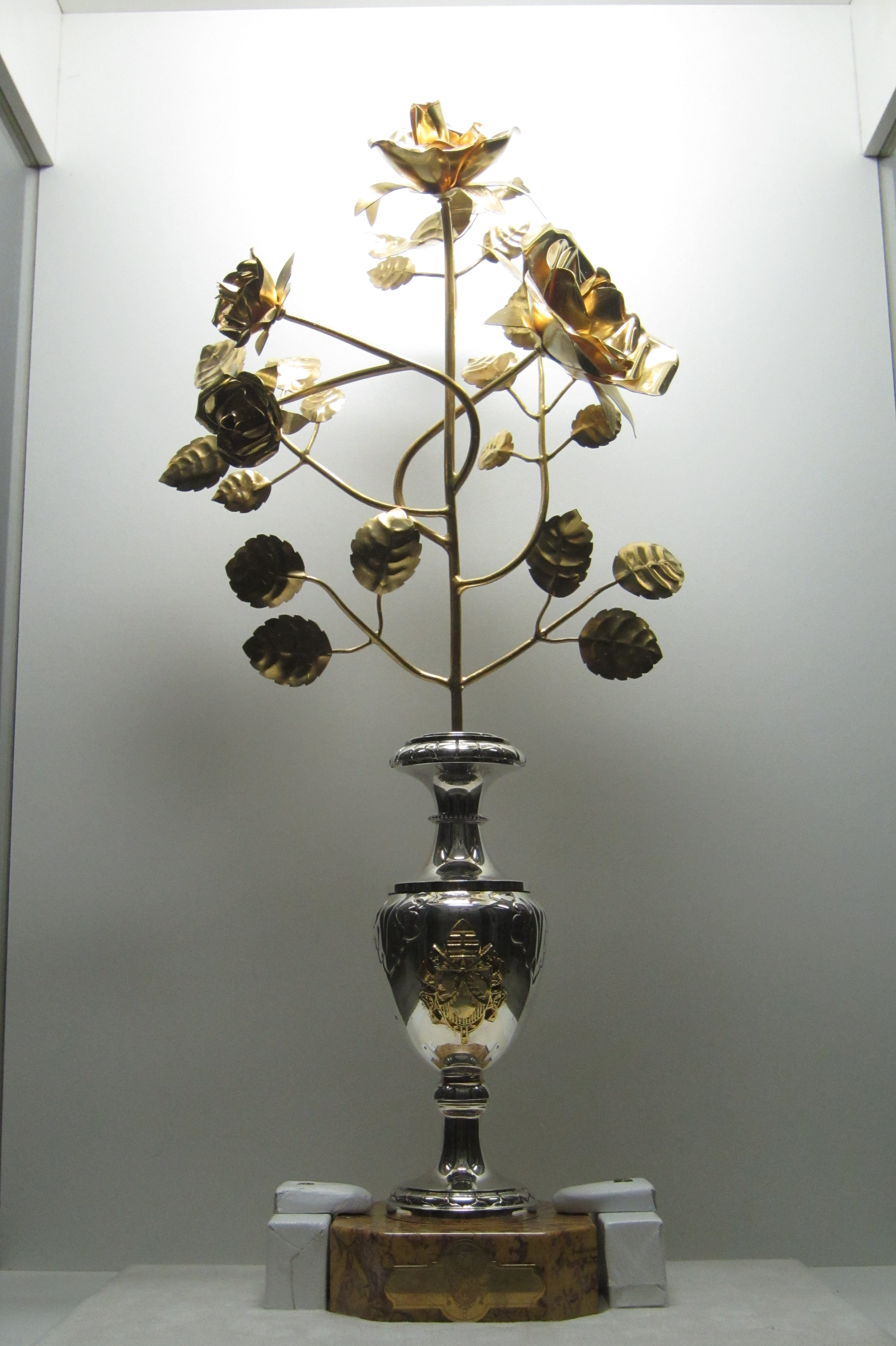
Golden Rose of the Basilica of Our Lady of Scherpenheuvel

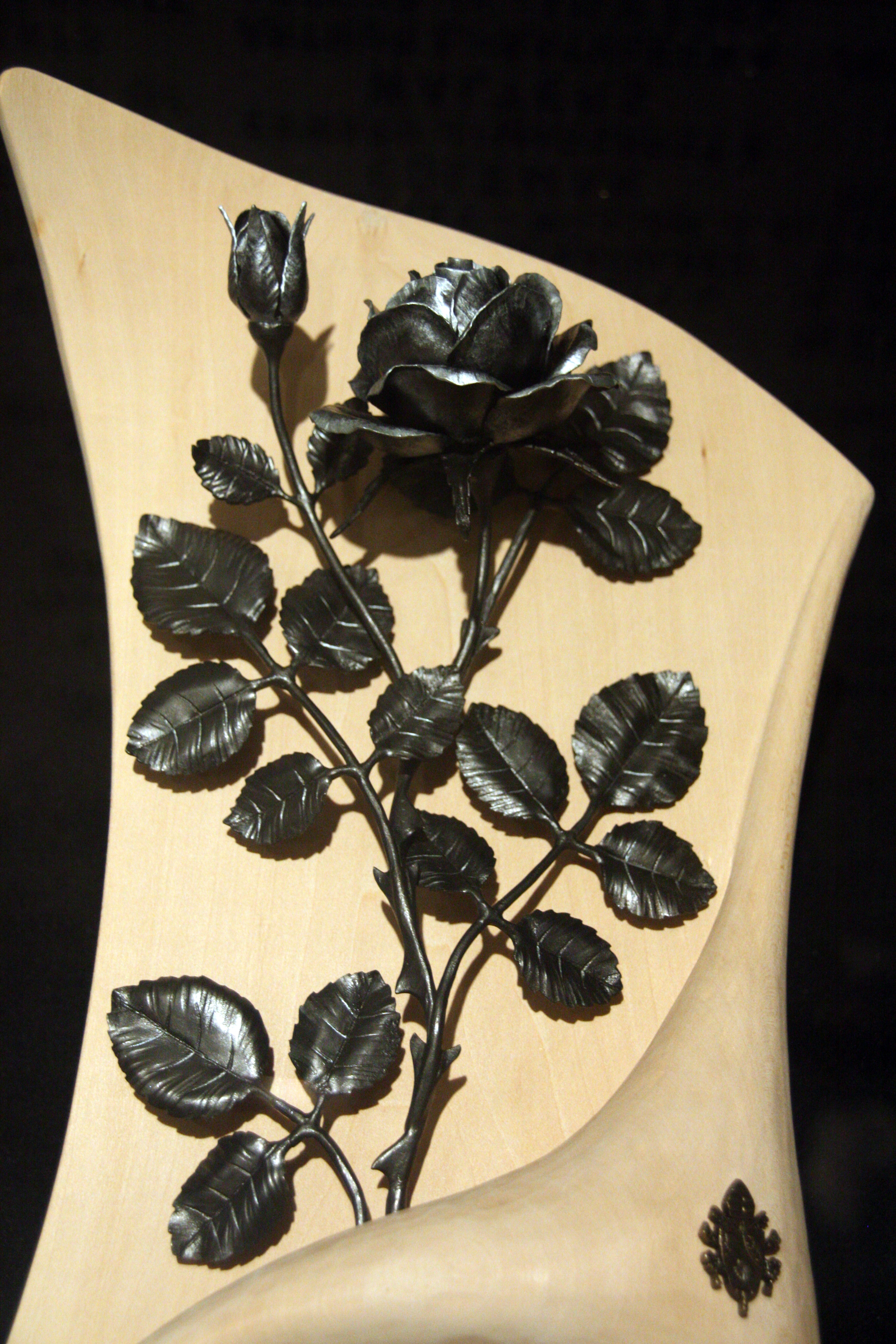
Golden Rose presented to the Basilica of the National Shrine of the Immaculate Conception by Pope Benedict XVI

Since Paul VI, all Golden Roses have been awarded to churches; all of Benedict XVI's, Francis', and Leo XIV's awards have been to Marian shrines or Marian images.

| Year | Recipient | Pope | Type of recipient | Geographical area of recipient | Notes |
|---|---|---|---|---|---|
| 1096 | Fulk IV, Count of Anjou | Urban II | man | France | |
| 1148 | Alfonso VII, King of León and Castile | Eugene III | man | Spain | |
| 1163 | Louis VII, King of France | Alexander III | man | France | |
| 1183 | William I, King of Scots | Lucius III | man | Scotland | |
| 1227 | Raimondo Orsini | Gregory IX | man | Italy | |
| 1244 | Church of Saint-Just, Lyon | Innocent IV | church | France | |
| 1304 | Church of San Domenico, Perugia | Benedict XI | church | Italy | |
| 1348 | Louis I, King of Naples | Clement VI | man | Italy | |
| 1348 | Louis I, King of Hungary | Clement VI | man | Hungary | |
| 1350 | Niccolò Acciaioli, Grand Seneschal of Naples | Innocent VI | man | Italy | |
| 1362-70 | Valdemar IV of Denmark | Urban V | man | Denmark | |
| 1368 | Joanna I, Queen of Naples | Urban V | woman | Italy | |
| 1369 | St. Peter's Basilica | Urban V | church | Italy | |
| 1389 | Raimondo Del Balzo Orsini | Urban V | man | Italy | |
| 1391 | Alberto d'Este, Marquis of Ferrara | Boniface IX | man | Italy | |
| 1393 | Astorre I Manfredi da Bagnacavallo | Boniface IX | man | Italy | |
| 1398 | Ugolino III Trinci, Lord of Foligno | Boniface IX | man | Italy | |
| 1410 | Niccolò III d'Este, Marquis of Ferrara | Alexander V | man | Italy | |
| 1411 | Charles VI, King of France | John XXIII | man | France | |
| 1413 | Luigi Alidosi, Lord of Imola | John XXIII | man | Italy | |
| 1415 | Sigismund, Holy Roman Emperor | John XXIII | man | Germany | |
| 1419 | Republic of Florence | Martin V | state | Italy | |
| 1420 | Guidantonio da Montefeltro, Count of Urbino | Martin V | man | Italy | |
| 1435 | Sigismund, Holy Roman Emperor | Eugene IV | man | Germany | |
| 1444 | Henry VI, King of England | Eugene IV | man | England | |
| 1448 | Casimir IV, King of Poland | Nicholas V | man | Poland | |
| 1452 | Frederick III, Holy Roman Emperor, and Empress Eleonora | Nicholas V | couple | Germany | received the day after they were crowned |
| 1457 | Charles VII, King of France | Callistus III | man | France | |
| 1461 March 15 | Thomas Palaiologos | Pius II | man | Greece | |
| 1477 | Ludovico III Gonzaga, Marquis of Mantua | Sixtus IV | man | Italy | |
| 1481 | Louis XI of France | Sixtus IV | man | France | |
| 1482 | Eberhard I, Duke of Württemberg | Sixtus IV | man | Germany | |
| 1486 | James III, King of Scotland | Innocent VIII | man | Scotland | |
| 1491 | James IV, King of Scotland | Innocent VIII | man | Scotland | |
| 1493 | Isabella I, Queen of Castile | Alexander VI | woman | Spain | |
| 1505 | Alexander Jagiellon, King of Poland | Julius II | man | Poland | |
| 1506 | Manuel I, King of Portugal | Julius II | man | Portugal | |
| 1514 | Manuel I, King of Portugal | Leo X | man | Portugal | Second award |
| 1518 | Frederick III, Elector of Saxony | Leo X | man | Germany | |
| 1512? | Henry VIII, King of England | Julius II | man | England | |
| 1521? | Henry VIII, King of England | Leo X | man | England | |
| 1524 | Henry VIII, King of England | Clement VII | man | England | |
| 1537 | Federico II Gonzaga, Duke of Mantua | Paul III | man | Italy | because of his kindness towards the Fathers of the Council of Trent |
| 1543 | Ercole II d'Este, Duke of Ferrara | Paul III | man | Italy | |
| 1548 | Catherine de' Medici, Queen of France | Paul III | woman | France | |
| 1550 | João Manuel, Prince of Portugal | Julius III | man | Portugal | |
| 1551 | Basilica di Santa Maria Maggiore | Julius III | church | Italy | |
| 1555 | Mary I, Queen of England | Paul IV | woman | England | |
| 1557 | María Enríquez Álvarez de Toledo, Duchess of Alba de Tormes | Paul IV | woman | Spain | wife of Fernando Álvarez de Toledo y Pimentel, 3rd Duke of Alba de Tormes |
| 1560 | Mary, Queen of Scots | Pius IV | woman | Scotland | |
| 1561 | Anne, Queen of Bohemia | Pius IV | woman | Bohemia | |
| 1564 | Republic of Lucca | Pius IV | state | Italy | |
| 1568 May 11 | Joanna of Austria, Grand Duchess of Tuscany | Pius V | woman | Italy | |
| 1572 | Charles IX, King of France | Gregory XIII | man | France | given in appreciation of the King's role in enabling St. Bartholomew's Day massacre |
| 1574 March 24 | Don John of Austria | Gregory XIII | man | Spain and Germany | given in the church of St. Clara, Naples, by the Pope's Chamberlain, "in token of his [the Pope's] benevolence and paternal love." |
| 1592 | Henry IV, King of France | Clement VIII | man | France | |
| 1597 | Morosina Morosini | Clement VIII | woman | Venice | given at her coronation as Dogaressa of Venice |
| 1598 | Margaret, Queen of Spain | Clement VIII | woman | Spain | received on the day she was married by proxy to Philip III, King of Spain |
| 1607 | Santa Maria sopra Minerva | Paul V | church | Italy | |
| 1610 | Sancta Sanctorum | Paul V | church | Italy | |
| 1625 | Henrietta Maria, Queen of England and Scotland | Urban VIII | woman | England and Scotland | received at Amiens |
| 1626/7 | Ferdinand II, Grand Duke of Tuscany | Urban VIII | man | Italy | |
| 1628 | Maddalena, Dowager Grand Duchess of Tuscany | Urban VIII | woman | Italy | |
| 1630 | Maria Anna, Queen of Hungary | Urban VIII | woman | Germany | later Empress Consort |
| 1631 | Taddeo Barberini, Prefect of Rome | Urban VIII | man | Italy | he was the pope's nephew |
| 1634 | St. Peter's Basilica | Urban VIII | church | Italy | |
| 1635 | Maria Anna, Electress of Bavaria | Urban VIII | woman | Germany | |
| 1649 | Mariana, Queen of Spain | Innocent X | woman | Spain | |
| 1651? | Marie Louise, Queen of Poland | Innocent X | woman | Poland | |
| 1654 | Lucrezia, Duchess of Modena | Innocent X | woman | Italy | |
| 1658 | Siena Cathedral | Alexander VII | church | Italy | cathedral of the pope's hometown, rose designed by Gian Lorenzo Bernini |
| 1668 | Maria Theresa, Queen of France | Alexander VII | woman | France | for her infant son, the Dauphin, for whom the pope was godfather |
| 1672 | Elenor, Queen of Poland | Clement X | woman | Poland | |
| 1684 March 25 | Marie Casimire Louise, Queen of Poland | Innocent XI | woman | Poland | |
| 1699 | Wilhelmina Amalia, Empress of the Holy Roman Empire | Innocent XII | woman | Germany | |
| 1701 | Maria Luisa, Queen of Spain | Clement XI | woman | Spain | |
| 1726 | Violante Beatrice, Grand Princess of Tuscany | Benedict XIII | woman | Italy | |
| 1736 | Maria Josepha, Queen of Poland | Clement XII | woman | Poland | |
| 1759 | Francesco Loredan, Doge of Venice | Clement XIII | man | Italy | |
| 1776 | Maria Christina, Duchess of Teschen | Pius VI | woman | Austria | |
| 1784 | Maria Amalia, Duchess of Parma | Pius VI | woman | Italy | |
| 1790 | Maria Carolina, Queen of Naples | Pius VI | woman | Italy | |
| 1819 | Caroline Augusta, Empress of Austria | Leo XII | woman | Austria | |
| 1825 | Maria Theresa, Queen Dowager of Sardinia | Leo XII | woman | Italy | |
| 1830 | Cathedral of Cingoli | Pius VIII | church | Italy | cathedral of the pope's hometown |
| 1832 | Maria Anna, Queen of Hungary | Gregory XVI | woman | Austria | later Empress Consort of Austria |
| 1833 | St Mark's Basilica | Gregory XVI | church | Italy | |
| 1842 | Maria II, Queen of Portugal | Gregory XVI | woman | Portugal | |
| 1849 | Princess Maria Pia of Savoy | Pius IX | woman | Italy | given by her godfather on the day of her baptism; later Queen Consort of Portugal |
| 1856 | Eugenie, Empress of the French | Pius IX | woman | France | |
| 1861 | Maria Sophie, Queen of the Two Sicilies | Pius IX | woman | Italy | |
| 1868 | Elisabeth, Empress of Austria | Pius IX | woman | Austria | |
| 1868 | Isabella II, Queen of Spain | Pius IX | woman | Spain | |
| 1870 | Sant'Antonio dei Portoghesi | Pius IX | church | Italy | |
| 1877 Sep. | Sanctuary of Our Lady of Lourdes | Pius IX | shrine | France | |
| 1886 | Maria Christina, Queen Dowager of Spain | Leo XIII | woman | Spain | |
| 1887 | Mary Gwendoline Caldwell | Leo XIII | woman | United States | Mrs. Caldwell had donated money towards the founding of the Catholic University of America |
| 1888 | Isabel, Princess Imperial of Brazil | Leo XIII | woman | Brazil | see Lei Áurea |
| 1892 | Amélie, Queen of Portugal | Leo XIII | woman | Portugal | |
| 1893 | Marie Henriette, Queen of the Belgians | Leo XIII | woman | Belgium | |
| 1923 | Victoria Eugenie, Queen of Spain | Pius XI | woman | Spain | |
| 1926 | Elisabeth, Queen of the Belgians | Pius XI | woman | Belgium | |
| 1930 | Elena, Queen of Italy | Pius XI | woman | Italy | |
| 1937 | Elena, Queen of Italy | Pius XI | woman | Italy | in observance of her 40th wedding anniversary |
| 1953 | Se Cathedral | Pius XII | church | India | placed on the tomb of Francis Xavier |
| 1956 | Charlotte, Grand Duchess of Luxembourg | Pius XII | woman | Luxembourg | |
| 1964 | Church of the Nativity | Paul VI | church | Palestine | |
| 1965 | Sanctuary of Our Lady of Fátima | Paul VI | shrine | Portugal | |
| 1966 March 25 | Basilica of Our Lady of Guadalupe | Paul VI | church | Mexico | |
| 1967 | Basilica of Our Lady Aparecida (now known as the "Old Basilica of Aparecida") | Paul VI | church | Brazil | |
| 1979 June | Black Madonna of Częstochowa | John Paul II | shrine | Poland | |
| 1979 Sep. | Knock Shrine | John Paul II | shrine | Ireland | |
| 1982 June | Basilica of Our Lady of Luján | John Paul II | shrine | Argentina | |
| 1985 June 28 | Basilica of Assumption of Mary and Saints Cyril and Methodius in Velehrad | John Paul II | shrine | Czech Republic | |
| 1987 June | Kalwaria Zebrzydowska | John Paul II | shrine | Poland | |
| 1988 May 14 | Sanctuary of Our Lady of the Evangelization | John Paul II | shrine | Lima, Peru | |
| 2000 Dec. | Holy House of Loreto | John Paul II | shrine | Italy | |
| 2004 Aug. 14 | Sanctuary of Our Lady of Lourdes | John Paul II | shrine | France | Second award |
| 2004 Oct. 17 | Saint Joseph's Oratory | John Paul II | church | Montreal, Canada | |
| 2004 Dec. | Sameiro Sanctuary | John Paul II | shrine | Braga, Portugal | |
| 2006 | Black Madonna of Częstochowa | Benedict XVI | shrine | Poland | Second award |
| 2007 May 12 | Basilica of the National Shrine of Our Lady Aparecida ("New Basilica of Aparecida") | Benedict XVI | shrine | Brazil | Second award to the image of Our Lady Aparecida. The first award was given to the image in 1967 when it was housed in the Old Basilica, before the construction and consecration of the new Basilica in 1980. |
| 2007 Sep. 8 | Basilica of the Birth of the Virgin Mary Mariazell | Benedict XVI | shrine | Austria | |
| 2008 Apr. 9 | Shrine of Our Lady of Altötting | Benedict XVI | shrine | Altötting, Germany | |
| 2008 Apr. 16 | Basilica of the National Shrine of the Immaculate Conception | Benedict XVI | shrine | Washington D.C., USA | |
| 2008 May 17 | Sanctuary of Nostra Signora della Misericordia | Benedict XVI | shrine | Savona, Italy | |
| 2008 May 18 | Shrine of Nostra Signora della Guardia | Benedict XVI | shrine | Genoa, Italy | |
| 2008 Sep. 7 | Shrine of Our Lady of Bonaria | Benedict XVI | shrine | Cagliary, Italy | |
| 2008 Oct. 19 | Shrine of the Virgin of the Rosary of Pompei | Benedict XVI | shrine | Pompei, Italy | |
| 2009 Apr. 28 | Shrine of Our Lady of the Cross | Benedict XVI | shrine | Aquila, Italy | after the earthquake |
| 2009 May | Shrine of Our Lady of Europe | Benedict XVI | shrine | Gibraltar | |
| 2009 Nov. 22 | Basilica of Nuestra Señora de la Cabeza | Benedict XVI | shrine | Jaén, Spain | |
| 2010 | Catedral Basílica de Nuestra Señora del Valle | Benedict XVI | church | Argentina | |
| 2010 Apr. 18 | Shrine of Our Lady of Ta' Pinu | Benedict XVI | shrine | Malta | |
| 2010 May 12 | Sanctuary of Our Lady of Fátima | Benedict XVI | shrine | Portugal | Second award |
| 2010 Aug. 23 | Sanctuary of Our Lady of the Valley | Benedict XVI | shrine | Catamarca, Argentina | |
| 2010 Nov. 13 | Virgen of Socorro | Benedict XVI | shrine | Valencia, Venezuela | |
| 2011 May 15 | Basilica of Our Lady of Scherpenheuvel | Benedict XVI | shrine | Belgium | |
| 2012 March 26 | Basílica Santuario Nacional de Nuestra Señora de la Caridad | Benedict XVI | church | Cobre, Cuba | |
| 2013 Nov. 22 | Basilica of Our Lady of Guadalupe | Francis | shrine | Mexico | Second award |
| 2015 June 21 | Santuario della Consolata | Francis | shrine | Italy | Given during the pope's visit during the public showing of the Shroud of Turin |
| 2016 July 28 | Black Madonna of Częstochowa | Francis | shrine | Poland | Third Award |
| 2017 May 13 | Sanctuary of Our Lady of Fátima | Francis | shrine | Portugal | Third Award |
| 2017 October 7 | Basilica of the National Shrine of Our Lady Aparecida ("New Basilica of Aparecida") | Francis | shrine | Brazil | Third award of the Golden Rose to the icon of Our Lady Aparecida; second award since the icon was transferred from the Old Basilica to the new Basilica. This award commemorates the 300 anniversary of the icon's appearance and of devotion to it. |
| 2018 September 23 | Our Lady of Trakai | Francis | Marian image | Lithuania | |
| 2019 June 1 | Our Lady of Csíksomlyó | Francis | Marian image | Transylvania, Romania | |
| 2021 September 15 | Basilica of Our Lady of Sorrows | Francis | shrine/Marian image | Slovakia | |
| 2022 April 2 | Blessed Virgin of Ta' Pinu | Francis | shrine | Malta | Second award |
| 2022 August 15 | Our Lady of Altagracia | Francis | Marian image | Dominican Republic | |
| 2022 November 18 | Our Lady of Chiquinquirá | Francis | church/Marian image | Venezuela | |
| 2023 October 7 | Our Lady of Montserrat | Francis | Marian image | Spain | |
| 2023 December 8 | Salus Populi Romani | Francis | Marian image | Italy | |
| 2024 February 26 | Our Lady of Peace and Good Voyage | Francis | shrine/Marian image | Philippines | Gifted in thanksgiving for the erection of the Antipolo Cathedral as an International Shrine. |
| 2024 September 8 | Our Lady of Luján | Francis | Marian image | Vanimo, Papua New Guinea | |
| 2024 September 26 | Our Lady of Luxembourg | Francis | church/Marian image | Luxembourg | |
| 2024 December 3 | Virgin of Hope of Macarena | Francis | Marian image | Spain | |
| 2025 October 11 | Sanctuary of Our Lady of Fátima | Leo XIV | shrine/Marian image | Portugal | Fourth award |
| 2025 December 1 | Our Lady of Lebanon | Leo XIV | shrine/Marian image | Lebanon | |
| 2026 May 30 | Our Lady of the Tabernacle | Leo XIV | Marian image | Toledo, Spain | Gifted in time for the centenary of the canonical coronation of the patroness of the city |
| 2026 June 8 | Virgin of Almudena | Leo XIV | Marian image | Spain | |
| 2026 September 7 | Our Lady of Good Counsel | Leo XIV | shrine/Marian image | Italy | |
| 2026 September 26 | Sanctuary of Our Lady of Lourdes | Leo XIV | shrine | France | Third award |
| 2026 November 8 | Our Lady of the Thirty-Three | Leo XIV | Marian image | Uruguay | |
| 2026 November 11 | Our Lady of Luján | Leo XIV | Marian image | Argentina | Second award |
| 2026 November 13 | Our Lady of Peace | Leo XIV | shrine | Chiclayo, Peru | |
| 2026 November 15 | Our Lady of Bethlehem | Leo XIV | Marian image | Cusco, Peru | |
