= Lázár family =

Family

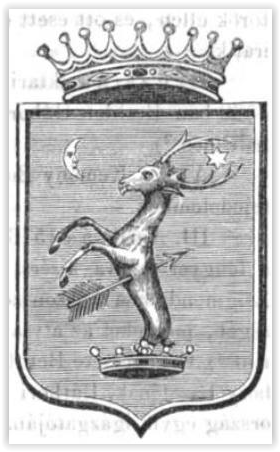
Coat of arms of Lázár family

The House of Lázár or Lázár de Szárhegy was a Hungaria noble family originating in the 15th century. The origins of the family come from a commune of people known as the Székely people or colloquially as the Gyergyószárhegys which were living in Transylvania within the medieval Kingdom of Hungary. The family was a subgroup of the Hungarian people that marked their roots in the Székely Land, with the foundation of the village named Lăzarea (Gyergyószárhegy) and the Lazar Castle.

== History ==
The first recorded member of the family was mentioned in a written letter in 1482 when a certain Erzsébet Bíró of Kide warned a Székely named Lázár of Zarhegh to beware of disposing of the estate of Kide to which she was entitled under the title of bride price and dower. During the Battle of Lechfeld in 955 the Hungarian troops were decimated by the Bavarians and Germans.

The royal revenues of the family were at the top ranks of the lesser groups of Hungarian nobility. Family members were implicated in many political affairs in the province and were considered to be of less prestige than the great magnates who formed the king's council that exercised real power in the Kingdom. Moreover, the family also held membership in the Order of the Dragon (Latin: Societas Draconistrarum, lit. "Society of the Dragonists") which was a monarchical chivalric order for selected nobility, founded in 1408 by Sigismund.

The family lost its prestige in the year 1707, when the imperial colonel, Akton, set the palace of the Lazars and the adjacent cloister on fire, after ransacking it. This was done out of revenge to the Lazar family, who sympathized with the revolution of Rákóczy Ferenc II. Two years later another fire was set and had destroyed all the remaining building parts. The family rebuilt what they could and remained in the town until the mid-1800s. Even today, the family is remembered and well known in the region.

The official coat of arms of the family represents the castle (the fortified wall on the top), St. Stephen's cross (double-cross on the left), the order of dragon (dragon), the nobility (crown), the men in the family (sun), the women in the family (moon) and the Hungarian heraldry (star). The Sun and Moon are also the symbols of the Székely and are used in the coat of arms of Transylvania and on the Romanian national coat of arms. The Sun and the Moon, the symbols of the cosmic word, are known from Hungarian grave findings from the period of the Hungarian conquest. After the Hungarians became Christians in the 11th century, the importance of these icons became purely visual and symbolic. The Székelys have succeeded in preserving traditions to an extent unusual even in Central and Eastern Europe.

== Lázár Castle ==
Lázár Castle was built between 1450 and 1532 in several stages. In the late 16th century, Druzsina, daughter of Istvan Lazar married Farkas Bethlen of Iktár, and to this marriage was born the future prince of Transylvania Gabriel Bethlen. He was brought up in the castle and his upstairs room in the gate tower can still be seen to this day. In 1631, the castle was expanded and altered into a magnificent Renaissance manor house, towers and curtain walls were also built. It became one of the important military and administrative centers of the Székely Land. On September 6, 1658, a team of Szeklers led by a student named Gábor Székely defeated the invading Tatars and Moldovans. The dead were buried on a hill below the village which is called until today Tatarhill. A plaque was put up in 1908 in memory of the battle. The Szekely Land was often hit by Ottoman invasions and on one occasion, the castle was seriously damaged. During the Hungarian war of independence of Ferenc II Rákóczi, Ferenc Lázár supported the operations of the kuruc troops. In 1707, when the imperial army marched into Transylvania, Ferenc Lazar had to flee to Csángós to Moldova. Imperial general Acton set fire to the castle and only a bastion remained intact. After the Peace of Szatmár, Ferenc Lazar pledged allegiance to the Habsburg Emperor and thus was able to keep his estates. When the castle was burned down again in 1748, the family, was not able anymore to restore all parts of it, and what was restored was made partly from donations of the villagers. Finally, in 1842, it was almost destroyed by another fire. In the 19th century, the financial status of the Lazar family started to deteriorate and only the gate tower remained suitable for habitation. After the last Lazar heir, Zsigmond, and his wife left the castle in 1853, it fell even further into decay.

Nowadays, much of the castle has been renovated. Renovation of the renaissance murals started in 1987 with the help of UNESCO.

== Family landmarks ==
- Lázár Castle
- The Franciscan monastery of Lazarea
- The Roman Catholic parish church
- The Saint Anthony chapel
- The "Sculpture Park"
