= Sanctuary of Our Lady of Sameiro =

Church building in Espinho, Portugal

Coordinates: 41.54184°N 8.36983°W

Basilica of Our Lady of Sameiro in Braga, Portugal

The Sanctuary of Our Lady of Sameiro or Sanctuary of Sameiro (Portuguese: Santuário de Nossa Senhora do Sameiro / Santuário do Sameiro) is a sanctuary and Marian shrine in Braga, Portugal.

The Shrine of Our Lady of Sameiro remains one of the most frequented places of Marian devotion in Portugal, the complex itself surpassed in size only by the Sanctuary of Fátima. At the top of a hill, Monte Sameiro, more than 350 metres above Braga, its setting offers a renowned view over the city and the valley of the Minho. Most spectacular is the prospect from the top of the basilica's dome. Every year many devotees come here, especially at times of pilgrimage on the first Sunday of June and the third Sunday of August. The sanctuary is close to Espinho, 4 km from Braga's centre and less than 2 km from the Sanctuary of Bom Jesus do Monte. The sanctuary's large garden contains a children's play area. There is also a museum.

== History ==
This site forms part of a Marian Shrine Route in Portugal for Christians. Mary, mother of Jesus, and often revered as “Nossa Senhora”, has long held a special place in Portuguese history. As national identity took shape (see Portugal in the Reconquista), a parallel and exceptional devotion to Mary saw the founding of monasteries, chapels, churches and sanctuaries that are still the focus of celebration and popular festivals. It is to Mary that the majority of cathedrals in Portugal are dedicated, for example those in Porto, Viseu, Lisbon and Évora.

Existence of the sanctuary is thanks to Fr Martinho Silva (1812-1875), priest in the archdiocese of Braga, and figurehead of a local Marian devotion from the middle of the 19th century. Only a generation earlier, religious houses throughout Portugal had been forced to close after the end of the Liberal Wars. This, however, had been tantamount to civil war, from which the dust could have barely settled. Many of those faithfully adherent to the Catholic Church, its institutions in Portugal ostensibly among the losers at cessation of hostilities, would have felt bereft and disorientated. Further afield, meanwhile, a vision reported by Catherine Labouré had ignited a general revival of devotion to Mary. Then, in December 1854, Pope Pius IX pronounced as dogma the Immaculate Conception, the belief that, from when she was conceived, Mary had been free of Original sin. The first diocese in Portugal to celebrate this was Braga, with an elaborate ceremony in January 1855. In short order would have come news of the revelations reported by Bernadette Soubirous at Lourdes.

Building the domed church started on 14 July 1863. On 28 August 1869 an outdoor shrine was dedicated. It incorporated a marble statue of Mary, work of a sculptor from Porto, Emidio Carlo Amatucci (1811-1872). Electrical failure was blamed for its being wrecked in 1883. Three years later a replacement had been found, the work of Antonio Teixeira Lopes. Developed over several decades, the religious complex at Sameiro also includes a venue for Mass in the Catholic Church, the Casa das Estampas, the Rector’s House, the Chapel of the Eucharist, the crypt under the church, and a grandiose flight of steps. At the top are monuments to the Sacred Heart and the Immaculate Conception. Close to the grounds' entrance are four statues honouring theologians noted for their writings about Mary: Cyril of Alexandria, Alphonsus Liguori, Bernard of Clairvaux and Anthony of Padua.

== Adornment ==
The church is in neoclassical style, of little particular artistic note apart from the silver tabernacle to be seen on the main altar, and the statue of Mary. This was sculpted in Rome by Eugénio Maccagnani, and arrived in 1880. In the 20th century the sanctuary was enriched with art works reflecting various aesthetic and religious styles. In the crypt there is a set of tile panels by Querubim Lapa. In the presbytery, a large panel by Oscar Casares (painter) was painted during 2005 and 2006. More recently, Clara Menéres was responsible for four great sculptures of Michael (archangel), Raphael (archangel) and Gabriel, along with the Angel of Portugal.

== Recognition ==
Pope Pius IX granted the decree of Canonical coronation to the Marian statue on 22 December 1876. To celebrate the fiftieth anniversary of the dogma of the Immaculate Conception, one of the statues of Mary was solemnly crowned by the Papal Nuncio, Archbishop Giuseppe M'acchi, on 12 June 1904, delegated for this event by Pope Pius X. Pope John Paul II visited on 15 May 1982. On 8 December 2004, he granted the shrine the Golden Rose, a papal distinction recognising 'relevant services to the catholic church, or for the good of society'.

== Gallery ==
Main façade and entrance steps

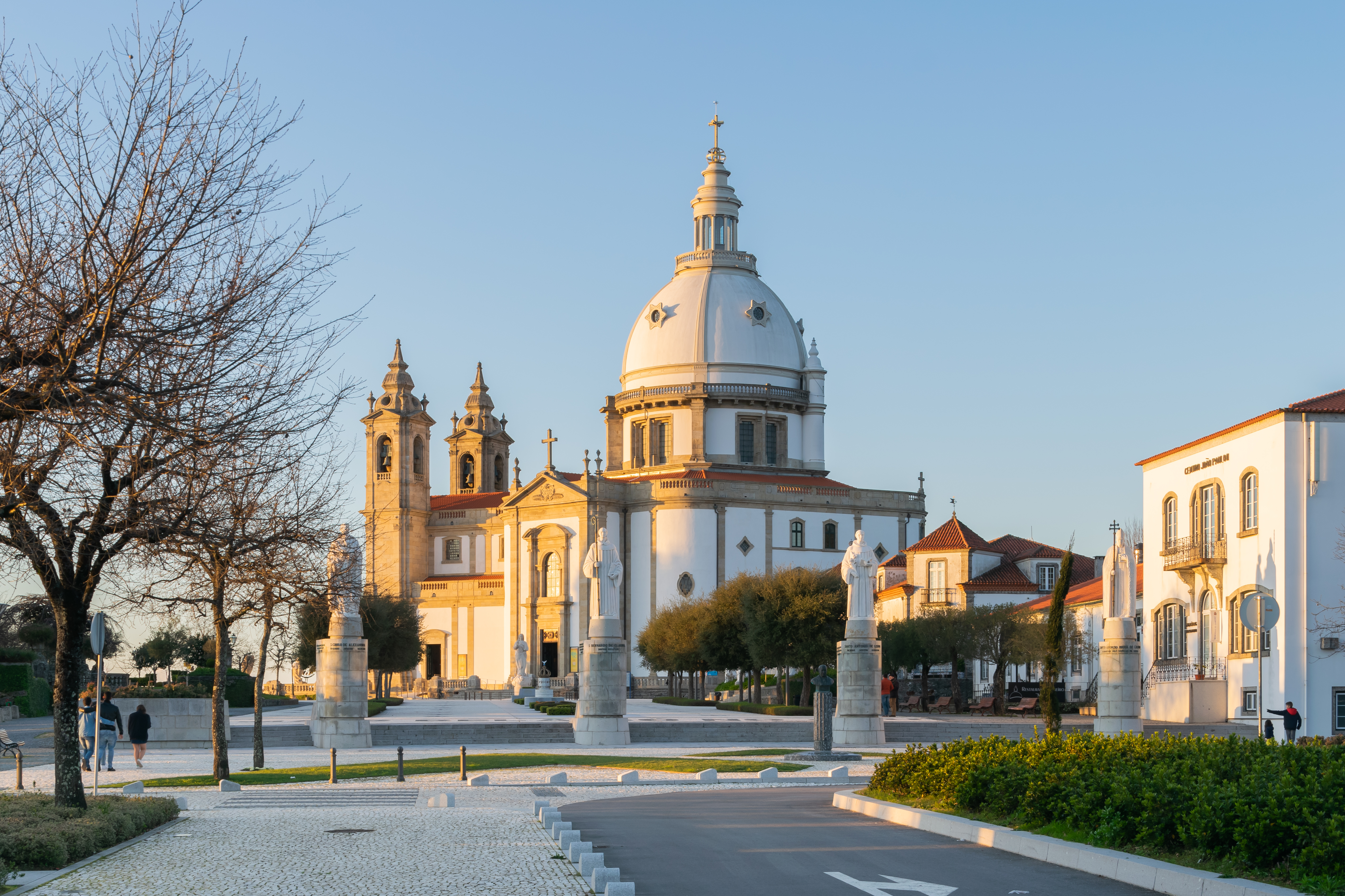
Basilica seen from the south

Nave looking toward the high altar

High altar and gilded altarpiece with the image of Our Lady of Sameiro

Nave looking toward the entrance

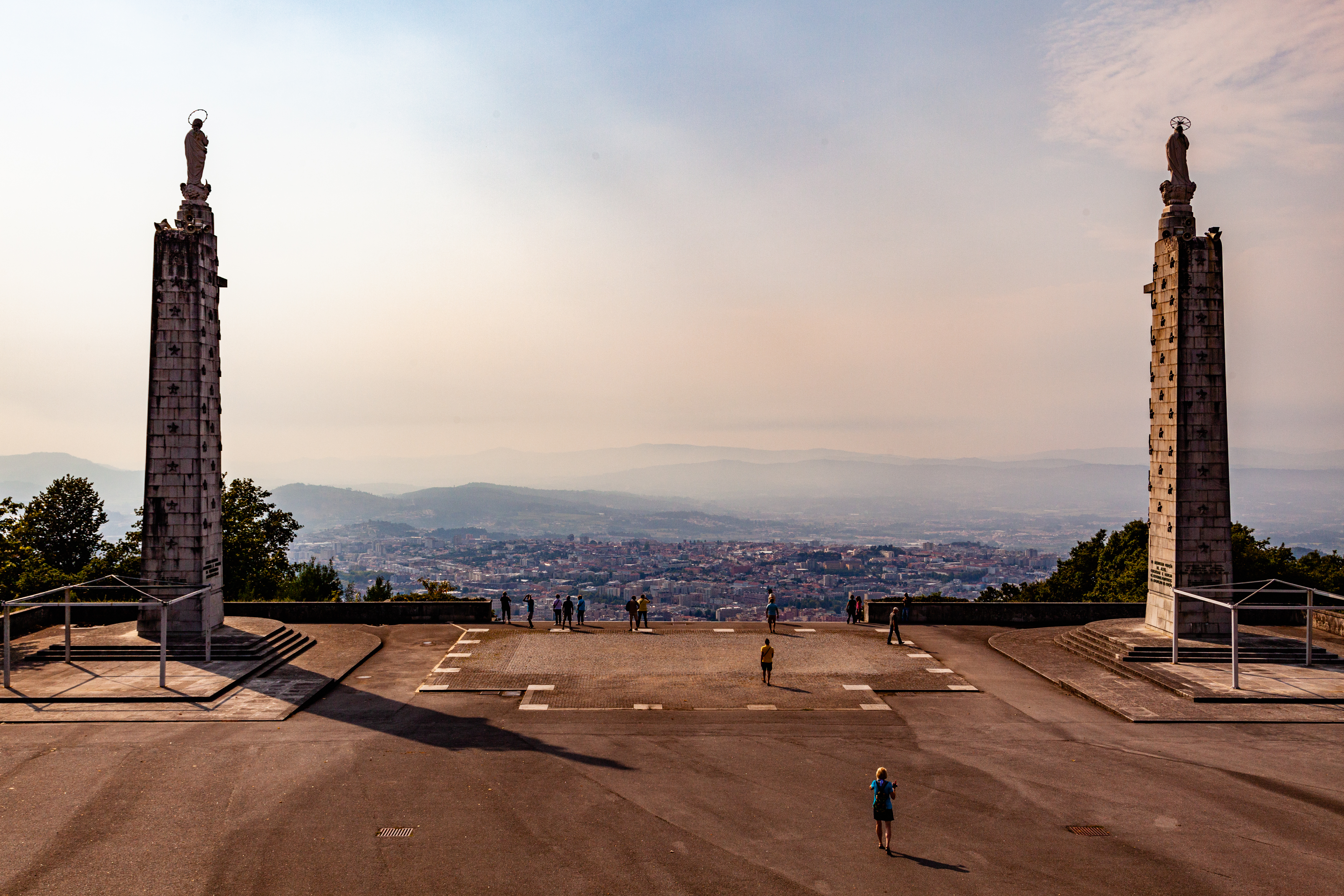
View over Braga framed by the sanctuary’s two pillars
