= Lázár Castle =

Coordinates: 46°44′57″N 25°31′50″E

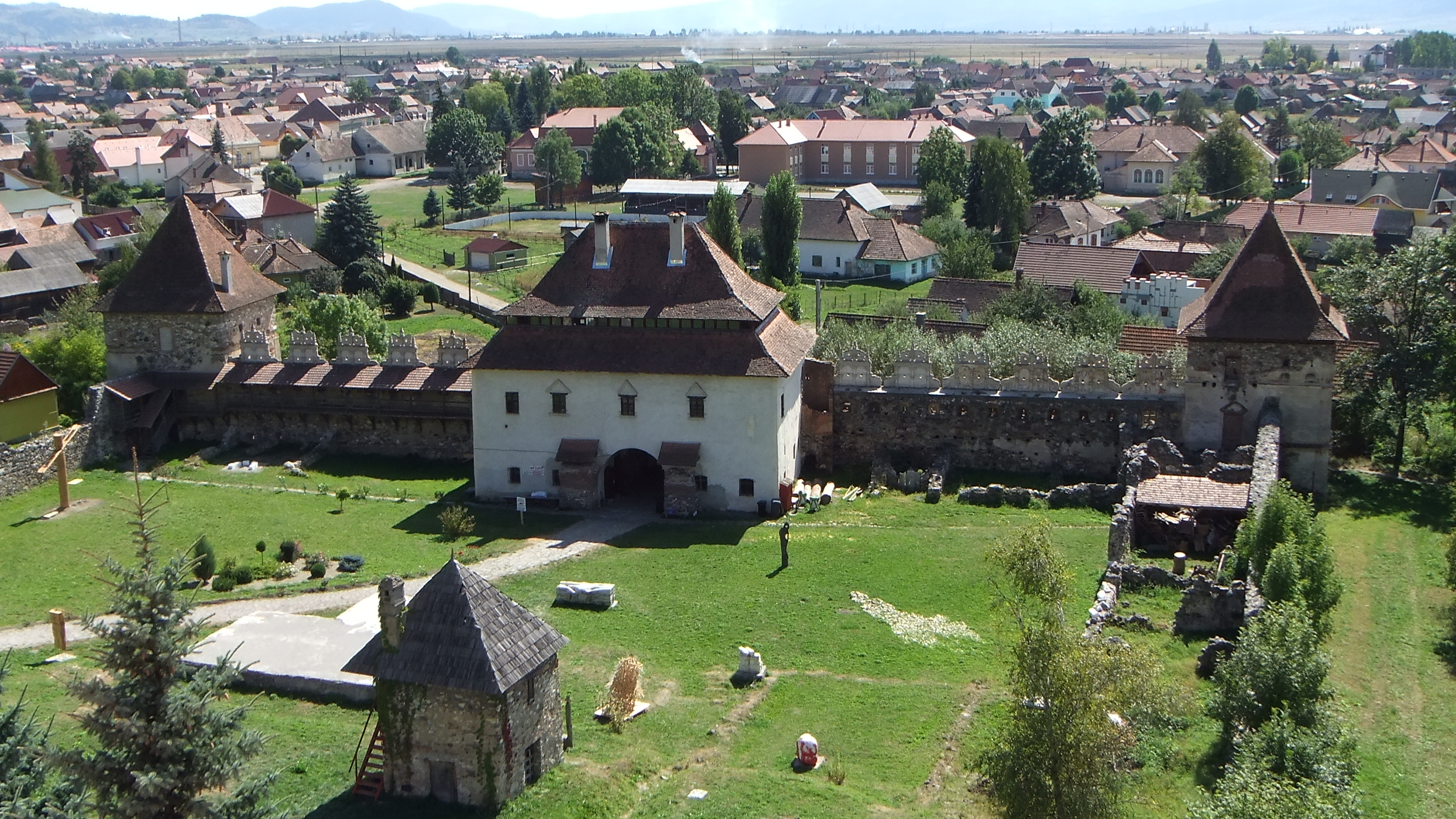
Lazar Castle

Lazar Castle (Romanian: Castelul Lazar, Hungarian: Lázár-kastély), is a castle located in Lăzarea, Harghita County, Romania. The citadel is named after the Lázár de Szárhegy noble family and it is built in a combination of Romanesque, Gothic, and Renaissance styles. The oldest part of the building dates from 1532, while the rest was added in 1631–1632.

== See also ==
- List of castles in Romania
- Tourism in Romania
- Villages with fortified churches in Transylvania
