= Johannes Caioni =

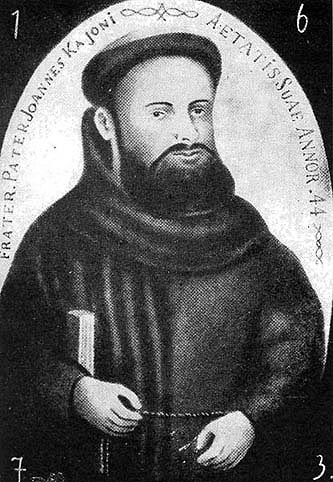
Johannes Caioni

Johannes Caioni (Ion Căian or Căianu in Romanian or Kájoni János in Hungarian; 8 March 1629 – 25 April 1687) was a Transylvanian Franciscan friar and Roman Catholic priest, musician, folklorist, humanist, constructor and repairer of organs of Romanian origin (according to his own testimony, "Natus valachus sum" - "I was born a Vlach").

== Biography ==
Caioni was born in Kiskaján (Căianu Mic), in the Principality of Transylvania (now in Bistrița-Năsăud County, Romania). He was raised in Kolozsvár (Cluj-Napoca) and Csíksomlyó (Șumuleu Ciuc). He was of a noble family — Caioni's aunt was the wife of a garrison commander in Csíkszereda (Miercurea Ciuc). Through her connections, he was admitted in the Franciscan monastery of Csíksomlyó (Șumuleu Ciuc).

Caioni studied with the Jesuits in Kolozsvár, and continued his studies in Csíksomlyó. In 1647, he became a friar, and continued his studies in Nagyszombat (Trnava), training in music. He was ordained in 1655. Subsequently, he lived in Csíksomlyó, Gyergyószárhegy (Lăzarea), and Mikháza (now Călugăreni, a village in Eremitu commune, Mureș County). He died in Gyergyószárhegy.

== Works and legacy ==
A Renascentist and precursor of the Age of Enlightenment in Transylvania, he is best known for his most important works:

- Codex Caioni,
- Organo Missale,
- Cantionale Catolicum,
- Sacri Concentus,
- Calendarium,
- Antiphonarium Romanum and others.

His mentioning of the traditional Călușari dance in his musical notations makes this among the first to have ever recorded the custom.

In 1675, Caioni founded a printing press in Csíksomlyó, printing both his works and textbooks for the local Franciscan school. His Cantionale Catolicum went through four editions—1676, 1719, 1805 and 1806. The press was noted for serving the cultural needs of Roman Catholics in the Székely Land and neighbouring Moldavia. It was later used by Hungarian revolutionaries of 1848 to print their Hadi Lap newspaper, and other publications.

== Music ==
- See Five centuries of German music in Transylvania.

Bucharest: Electrecord, 1995.

- See Black Pencil: Come out, Caioni!

Münster: Dreyer Gaido, 2021
