= Lăzarea (river) =

Lăzarea Szárhegy-patak
- Location within Romania

Location
- Country: Romania
- Counties: Harghita County
- Villages: Lăzarea

Physical characteristics
- Source: Hășmaș Mountains
- Mouth: Mureș
  - coordinates: 46.7729°N 25.4505°E
- Length: 16 km (9.9 mi)
- Basin size: 31 km^{2} (12 sq mi)

Basin features
- Progression: Mureș→ Tisza→ Danube→ Black Sea
- Tributaries
  - left: Chiuruțul de Mijloc, Chiuruțul Mic
  - right: Cianod

The Lăzarea (also: Chiuruț or Chiuruțul Mare, Hungarian: Szárhegy-patak) is a right tributary of the river Mureș in Transylvania, Romania. It flows through the village Lăzarea, and joins the Mureș near the village Remetea. Its length is 16 km (9.9 mi) and its basin size is 31 km^{2} (12 sq mi).

Its Hungarian name contains the archaic word "szár" for "bold", so the name means "Boldmountain Creek".
