= Csíksomlyó Pilgrimage =

Pentecost Pilgrimage of Hungarians in Romania

Csíksomlyó Pilgrimage is a Pentecost Pilgrimage of Hungarians in Șumuleu Ciuc (Hungarian: Csíksomlyó), Transylvania, Romania.

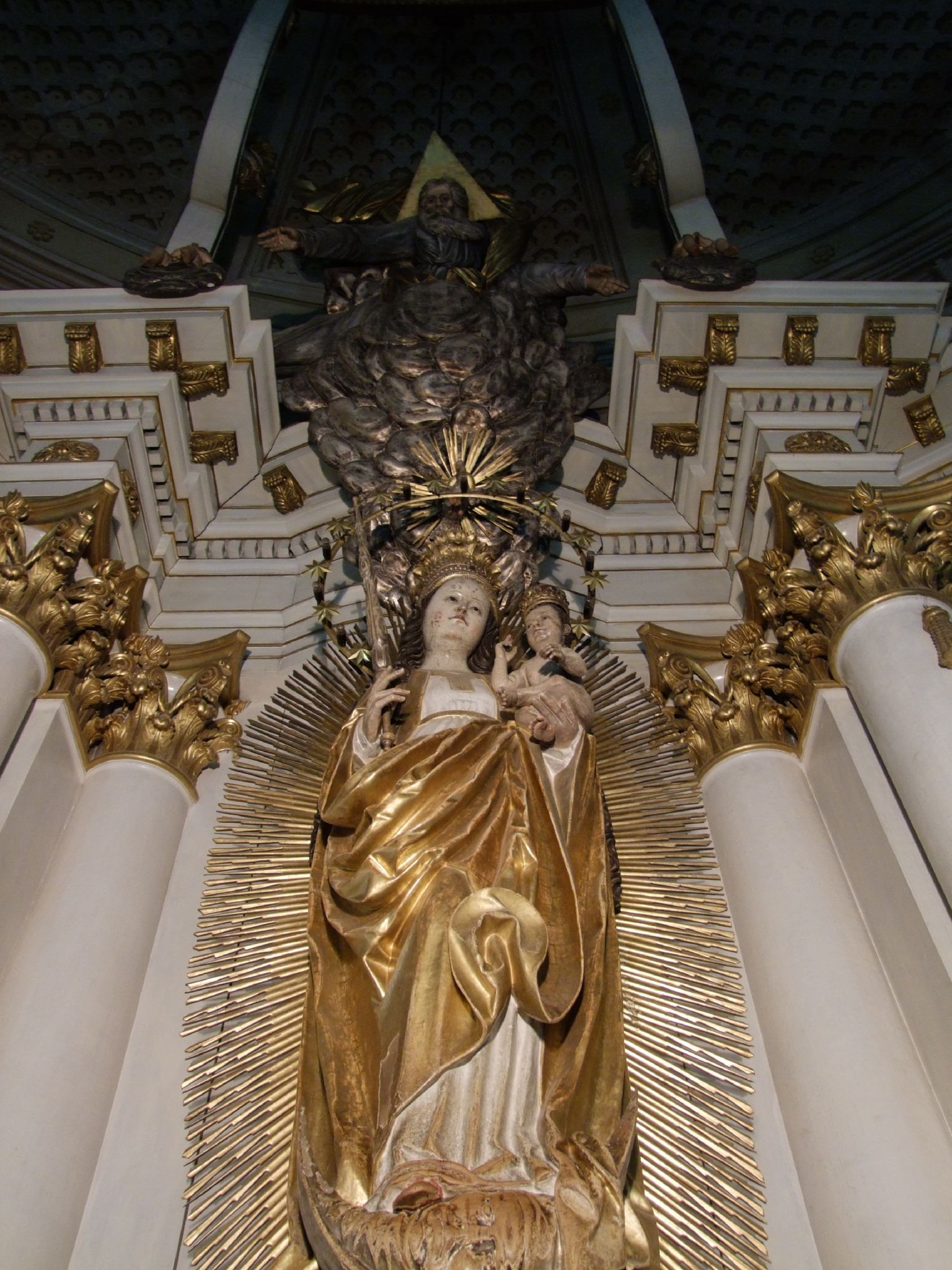
"The Blessed Virgin Mary clothed in the sun”

== History ==
Csíksomlyó became a pilgrimage site in 1442. In the 1990s, the church and the surrounding region could no longer accommodate the hundreds of thousands pilgrims. In 1993, a new altar was built at the mountain side and since then the celebration of the Eucharist have been taking place outdoors.

== The Statue of the Virgin Mary ==
The most important creation of the Pilgrimage Church is the statue that represents the Virgin Mary.

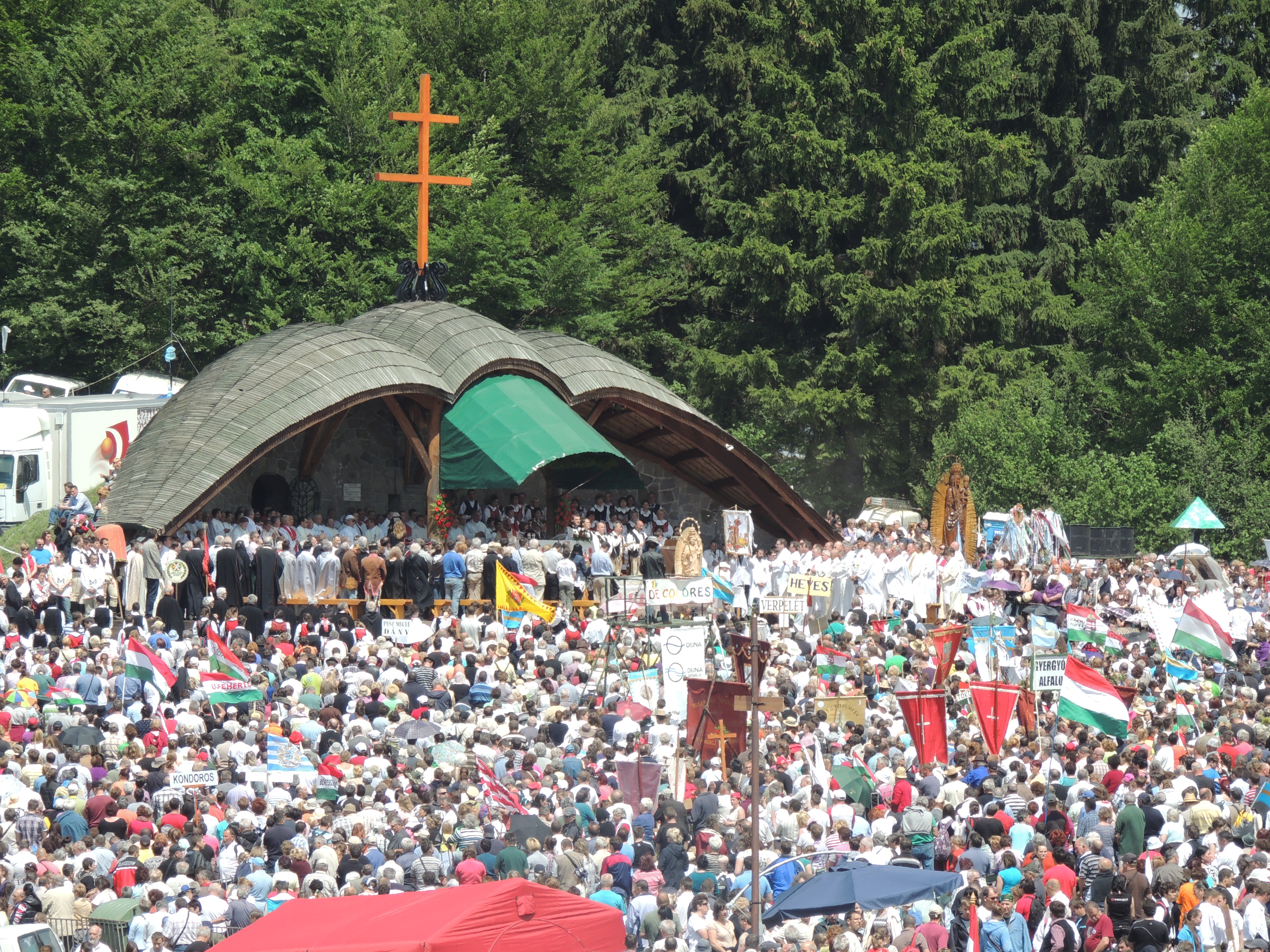
The Three Hill Altar on the "Saddle", used for celebrating the mass for the pilgrims

This was made of linden wood in Renaissance style between the years 1510 and 1515. The artist who created it is unknown. Its height is 227 cm and it is the highest of all statues known in the world. It represents the Lady Dressed in the Sun who has the moon under her feet and a wreath made of twelve stars around her head. There is also a crown on her head, in her right hand a scepter, in her left arm her Holy Son, the baby Jesus. In 1798 it was recognized as miraculous by the bishop Ignác Batthyány and he gave her the following name: “Wonderful and helpful Mother in protecting against heretics”.

During the centuries many miracles were reported to happen with the statue. Several times it was said shining so that its light filled the church.

In 1661, the church was ravaged by Tartars and Turks and it was set on fire. In a miraculous way the statue remained undamaged.

In the previous centuries, until the 1950s the baby Jesus used to be dressed. The colour of its dress changed according to the ecclesiastical liturgy.
