= Lăzarea =

Lăzarea Gyergyószárhegy
- Commune
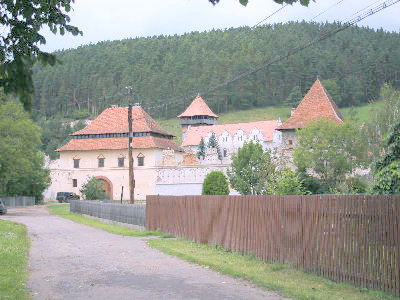
- The Lázár Castle

- Coat of arms

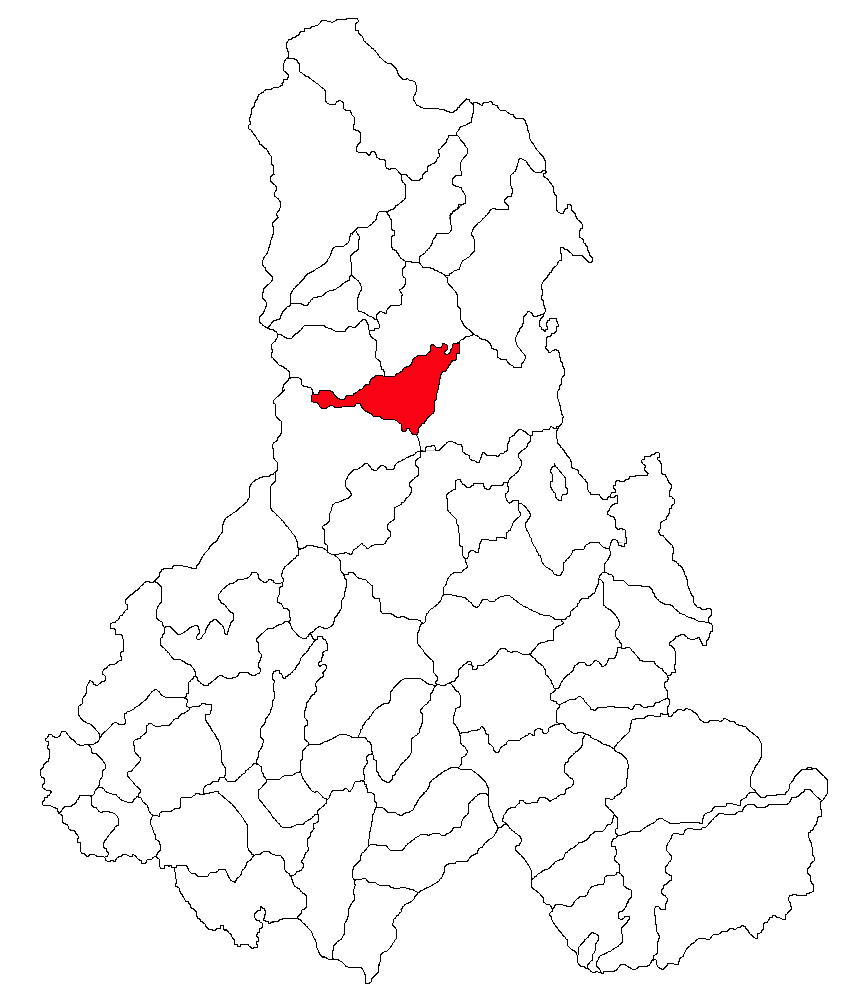
- Location in Harghita County

- Location in Romania
- Coordinates: 46°45′N 25°32′E
- Country: Romania
- County: Harghita

Government
  - Mayor (2020–2024): Ervin Danguly (Ind.)
- Area: 80.88 km^{2} (31.23 sq mi)
- Elevation: 777 m (2,549 ft)
- Population (2021-12-01): 3,313
  - Density: 40.96/km^{2} (106.1/sq mi)
- Time zone: UTC+02:00 (EET)
  - Summer (DST): UTC+03:00 (EEST)
- Postal code: 537135
- Area code: +40 266
- Vehicle reg.: HR
- Website: www.lazarea.ro

Lăzarea (Hungarian: Gyergyószárhegy or colloquially Szárhegy, Hungarian pronunciation: [ˈɟɛrɟoːsaːrhɛɟ], meaning Bald Mountain in Gyergyó) is a commune in Harghita County, Romania. It lies in the Székely Land, an ethno-cultural region in eastern Transylvania, and is composed of two villages, Ghiduț (Güdüc) and Lăzarea.

The commune is one of the oldest settlements in the area, and is now a tourist and cultural centre. It has various local attractions, including the Lázár Castle (1450). It is located in the central-north part of the county, at the foot of the Căliman-Harghita Mountains, on the banks of the river Lăzarea.

== History ==
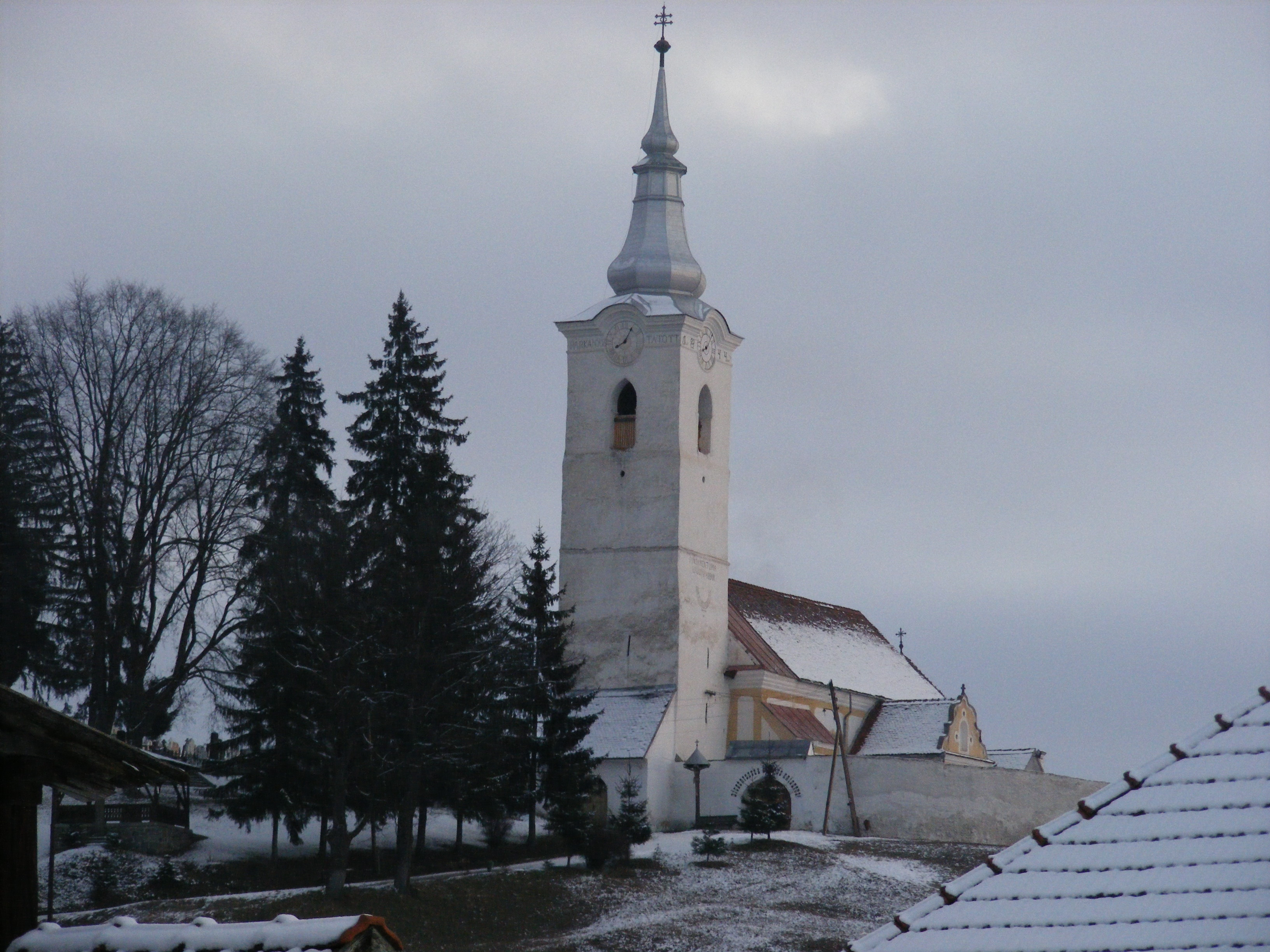
Roman Catholic church

The history of the village is closely interwoven with that of the Lázár family.

Its first written mention is from 1482 when a certain Erzsébet Bíró of Kide warned a Székely named Lázár of Zarhegh and Péter Szilvási to beware of disposing of the estate of Kide to which she was entitled under the title of bride price and dower. In 1576, its name was recorded as Szárhegy, in 1888 as Gyergyó-Szárhegy. Its original Romanian name derived from the Hungarian Gyergyószárhegy as Giugeu-Sarheghi which was modified to the current official name after 1918.

The commune belonged administratively to the Székely seat of Gyergyószék, subsequently absorbed into Csíkszék district, until the administrative reform of Transylvania in 1876, when it fell within Csík County in the Kingdom of Hungary. In the aftermath of World War I and the Hungarian–Romanian War of 1918–1919, the village passed under Romanian administration; after the Treaty of Trianon of 1920, like the rest of Transylvania, it became part of the Kingdom of Romania. During the interwar period it fell within Plasa Gheorgheni of Ciuc County. In 1940, the Second Vienna Award granted Northern Transylvania to Hungary and the village was held by Hungary until 1944. After Soviet occupation, the Romanian administration returned and the village became officially part of Romania in March 1945. Between 1952 and 1960, the commune belonged to the Ciuc raion of the Magyar Autonomous Region, and between 1960 and 1968 to the Mureș-Magyar Autonomous Region. In 1968, the province was abolished, and since then, the commune has been part of Harghita County.

== Demographics ==
The commune has an absolute Székely (Hungarian) majority. According to the 2011 census, it has a population of 3,424, of which 96.38% are Hungarians and 1.14% are Romanians.

== The Lázár Castle ==
The Lázár Castle was built between 1450 and 1532 in several stages. In the late 16th century, Druzsina, daughter of István Lázár married Farkas Bethlen de Iktár, and to this marriage was born the future Prince of Transylvania Gabriel Bethlen. He was brought up in the castle and his upstairs room in the gate tower can still be seen unto this day. In 1631, the castle was expanded and altered into a magnificent Renaissance manor house, towers and curtain walls were also built. It became one of the important military and administrative centers of the Székely Land. On September 6, 1658, a team of Szeklers led by a student named Gábor Székely defeated the invading Tatars and Moldavians. The dead were buried on a hill below the village, which is called until today Tatarhill. A plaque was put up in 1908 in memory of the battle. The Szekely Land was often hit by Ottoman invasions and on one occasion, the castle was seriously damaged. During the Hungarian War of Independence of Ferenc II Rákóczi, Ferenc Lázár supported the operations of the kuruc troops. In 1707, when the imperial army marched into Transylvania, Ferenc Lázár had to flee to the Csángós in Moldavia. Imperial general Acton set fire to the castle and only a bastion remained intact. After the Peace of Szatmár, Ferenc Lazár pledged allegiance to the Habsburg Emperor and thus was able to keep his estates. When the castle was burned down again in 1748, the family, was not able any more to restore all parts of it, and what was restored was made partly from donations of the villagers. Finally in 1842, it was almost completely destroyed by another fire. In the 19th century, the financial status of the Lázár family started to deteriorate and only the gate tower remained suitable for habitation. After the last Lázár heir, Zsigmond and his wife, left the castle in 1853, it fell even further into decay.

Nowadays, much of the castle has been renovated. Renovation of the Renaissance murals started in 1987 with the help of UNESCO.

== Landmarks ==
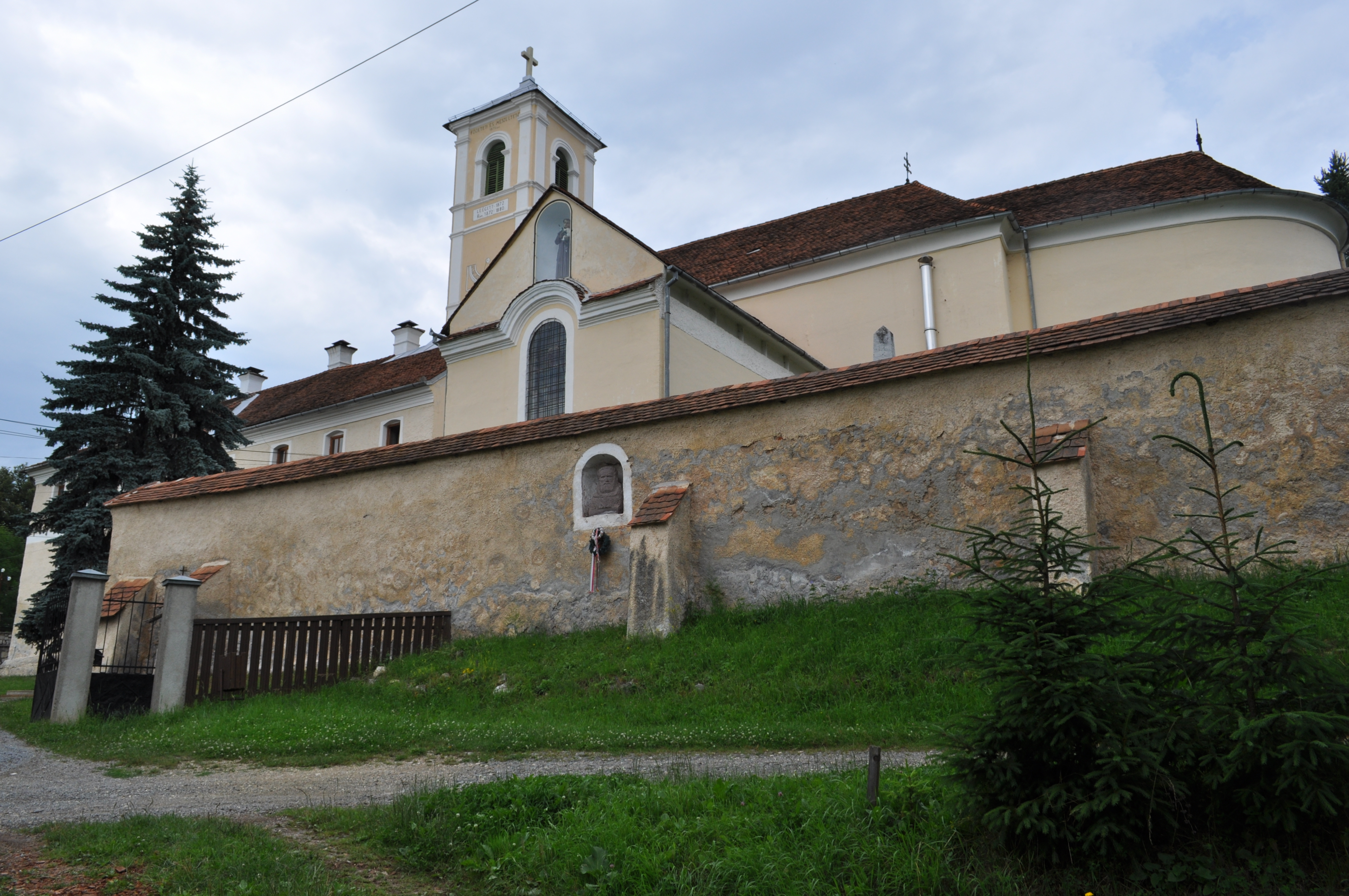
Franciscan monastery

- The Lázár Castle
- The Franciscan monastery
- The Roman Catholic parish church
- The Saint Anthony chapel
- The "Sculpture Park"

== Transportation ==
The Lăzarea railway station serves the Căile Ferate Române Line 400, which runs from Brașov to Satu Mare.

== Notable people ==
- Johannes Caioni (1629–1687), Transylvanian Franciscan friar, architect, musician, and humanist who lived and worked in the village.
- János Koós (1937–2019}, Hungarian singer and actor was born here.

== Twinnings ==
The commune is twinned with:

- Dombóvár, Hungary
- Halászszentlászló, Hungary
- Kemecse, Hungary
- Mátraderecske, Hungary
- Móricgát, Hungary
- Nagybajom, Hungary
- Őcsény, Hungary
- Trois-Ponts, Belgium
- Vecsés, Hungary
