= Oscar Casares (painter) =

Portuguese painter

Oscar Casares (December 8, 1977) is a Portuguese painter and a costume and fashion designer.

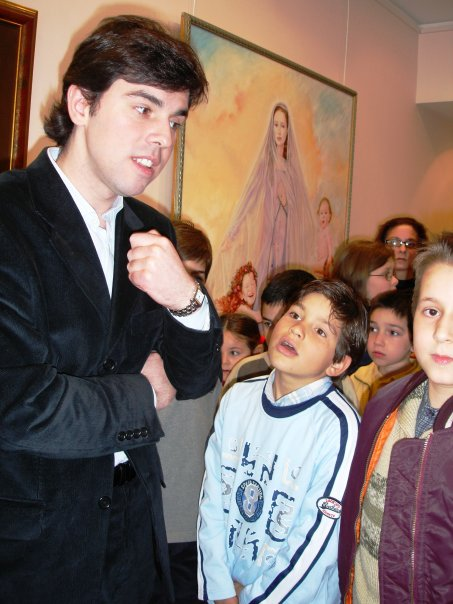
Oscar Casares in 2005

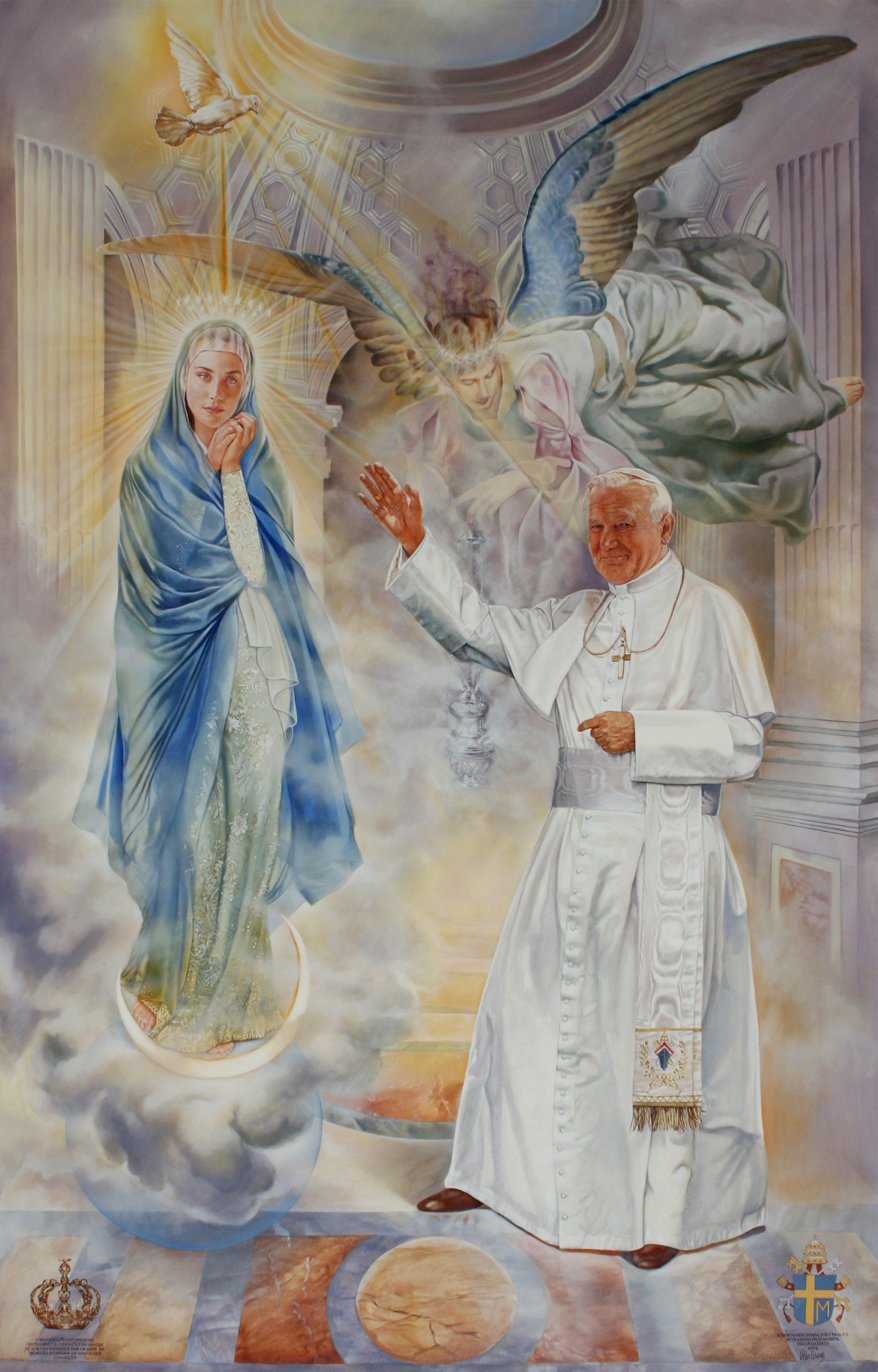
Casares: Pope John Paul II

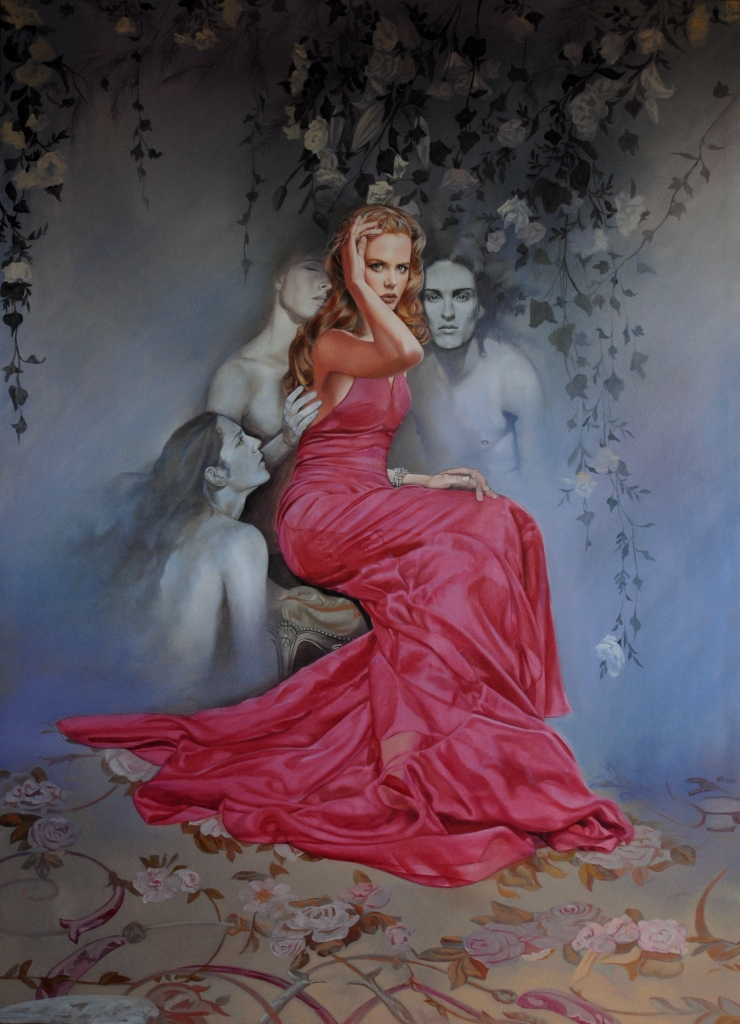
Casares: Nicole Kidman

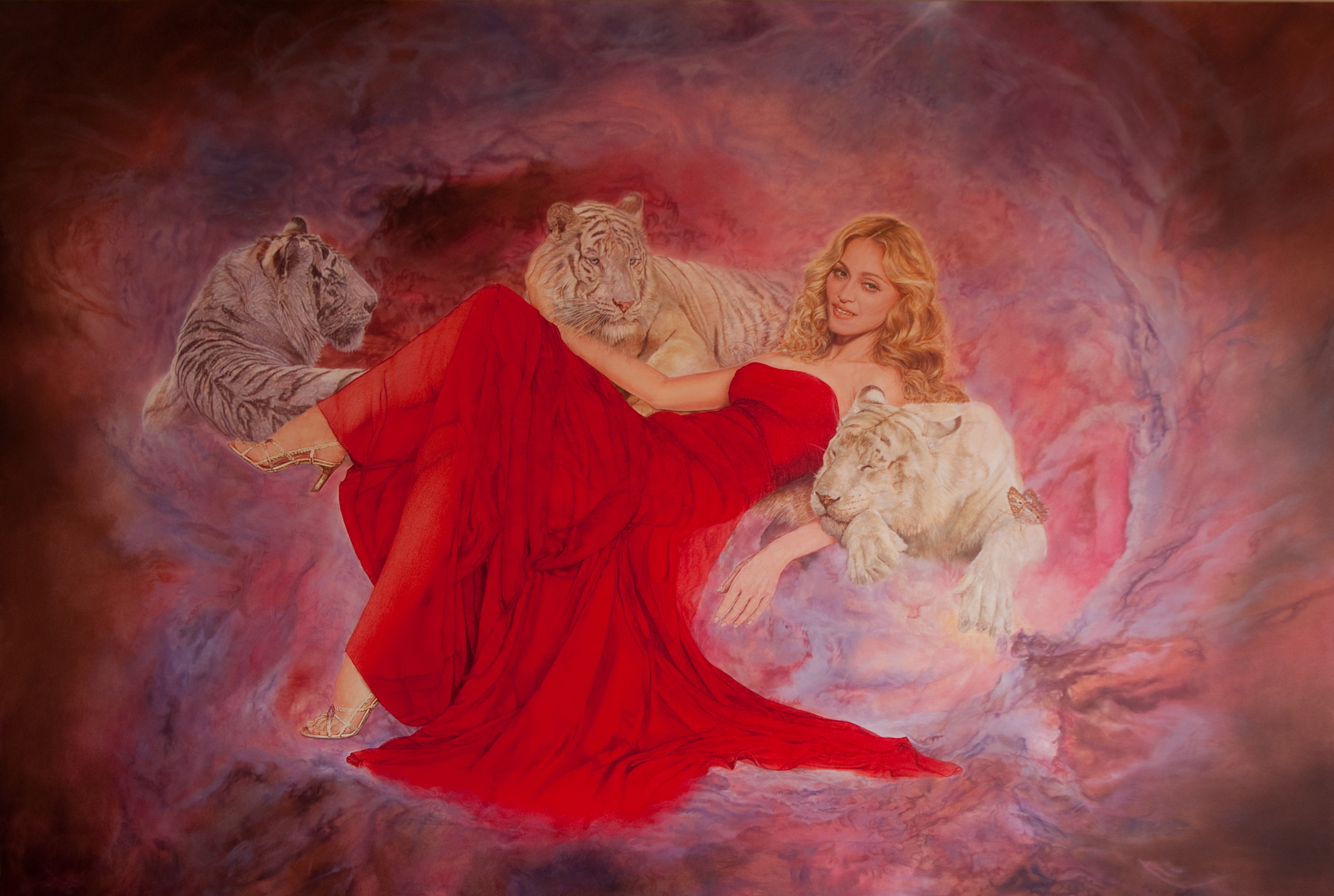
Casares: Portrait of Madonna

== Education ==
He spent his childhood in the village of Santa Maria Távora. He began his academic career at Arcos de Valdevez. He graduated cum laude from the General Arts Course in Braga. He was taught and mentored by Maria de Lourdes Magalhães.

== Career ==
He started his painting career in 1990. In 1993, he was invited to be the official portrait artist for the Belo-Belo Gallery. He was asked to paint the last official portrait of Pope John Paul II, and the portrait received high regard from the Pope in 2004. In 2008, he painted a portrait of Nicole Kidman.

Oscar's work is represented in more than three hundred private collections all over the world, Australia, Angola, Belgium, Brazil, Spain, USA, France, Portugal, United Kingdom, Switzerland and Vatican.

== Selection of works ==
- Eve, 1994
- Self Portrait, 1995
- As Facing Fear, 1996
- The Viennese, 1997
- The Sunset, 1997
- The Kiss, 1998
- The Coronation of Inês de Castro; 1999
- Portrait of His Royal Highness Dona Isabel de Heredia, 2000
- The Duchess of Bragança, 2001
- Senhora da Oliveira, 2001
- The Seven Gifts of the Holy Spirit, 2002
- Pentecost, 2003
- Last Official Portrait of John Paul II, 2004
- Panel Salve Regina, 2005/2006
- Senhora do Carmo Protecting the Carmelites, 2007/2008
- Official Portrait of Nicole Kidman, 2008
- Virtues of the Soul eclipsed by Diva Madonna, 2009
- The Eucharist, 2009
- Eternal Meditation, 2010
- Santa Maria de Braga 2011
- Our Lady with the Pomegranate Boy, 2012
- Souplesse, 2013
- Portrait of His Holiness Pope Francis, 2013/2014

== Some exhibition work ==
- 1996: European traveling exhibition - Brussels, Belgium
- 1997: Exhibition at the Municipal Museum Gallery Vouzela Portugal
- 1998: "Travel on the human figure" - Monastery of St. Martin of Tibães - Braga, Portugal
- 1999: Nogueira da Silva Museum - Braga, Portugal
- 2000/2001: AYIC - New York, United States of America
- 2001: "In Memory of Women of the House of Braganza" - invited by the "European Heritage Days" - Palace of the Dukes of Braganza - Guimarães, Portugal
- 2001/2002: Church of Frei Aleixo - Évora, Portugal
- 2005/2006: Sameiro Sanctuary in Braga, Portugal
- 2007/2008: International Centre of the Order of Carmelites - Fatima, Portugal
- 2009: Oscar was invited to the Second International Contemporary Art Exhibition at the Museum of the Americas - Miami, United States of America
- 2009: Biennale of Florence, Italy
- 2010: The Association The Golden Triangle of Fine Arts, invited Oscar Casares to participate in the International Art Fair - Taza, Morocco
- 2010: That Gallery (Unwrap Your Mind Art Exhibition) - Hong Kong, China
- 2011: "The Story of the Nativity" - Monastery of St. Martin of Tibães - Braga, Portugal
- 2012/2013: Painting Exhibition and couture entitled "Hands Given Arts" - Pius XII Museum - Braga, Portugal
