= Pustnic =

- Location within Romania

Location
- Country: Romania
- Counties: Harghita County
- Villages: Șoimeni, Păuleni-Ciuc

Physical characteristics
- Mouth: Olt
  - coordinates: 46.3716°N 25.7664°E
- Length: 15 km (9.3 mi)
- Basin size: 46 km^{2} (18 sq mi)

Basin features
- Progression: Olt→ Danube→ Black Sea
- Tributaries
  - left: Orociu, Șumuleu

The Pustnic is a left tributary of the river Olt in Romania. It flows into the Olt near Miercurea Ciuc. Its length is 15 km (9.3 mi) and its basin size is 46 km^{2} (18 sq mi).
