= Sândominic =

Sândominic Csíkszentdomokos
- Commune
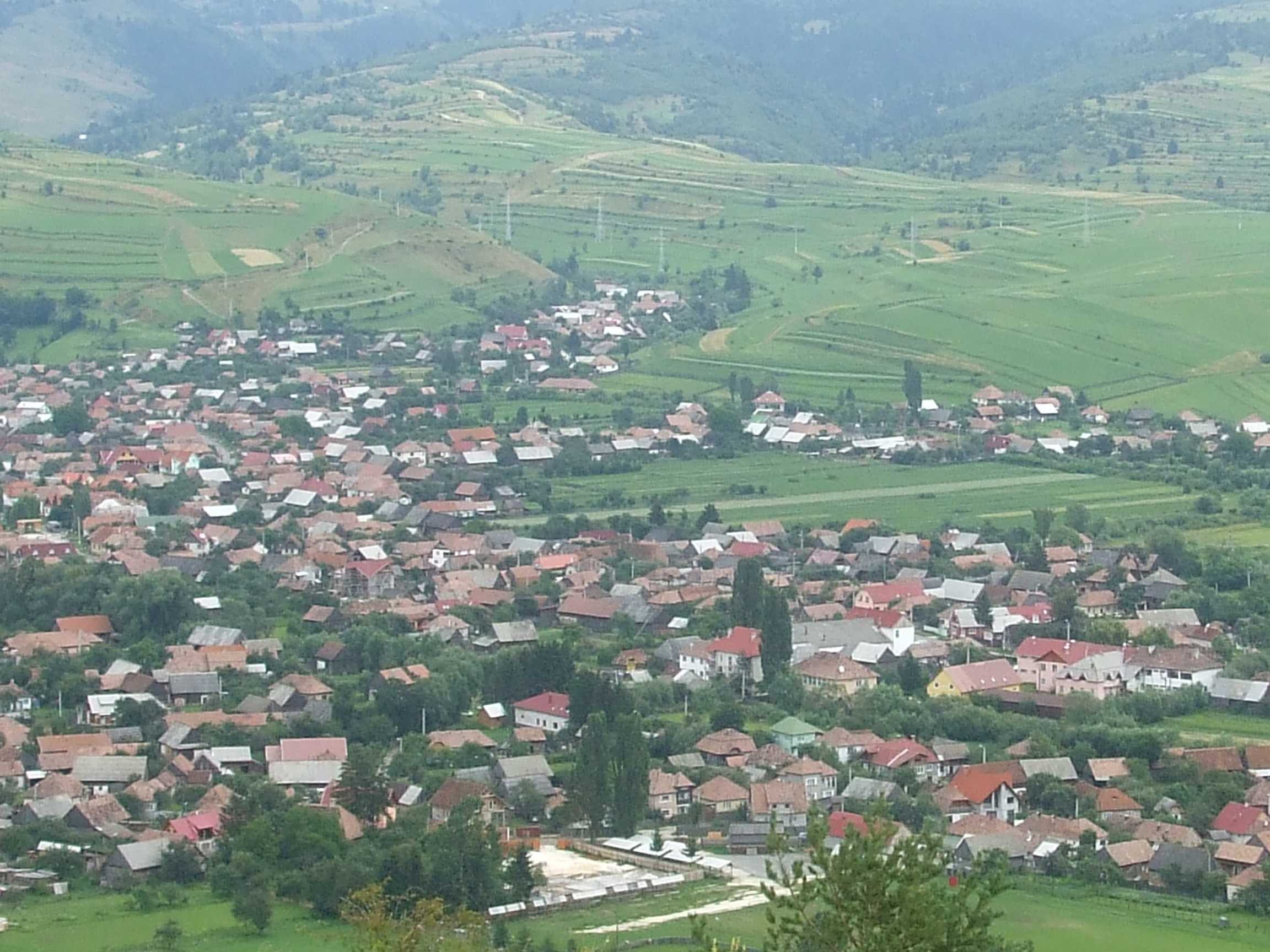

- Coat of arms

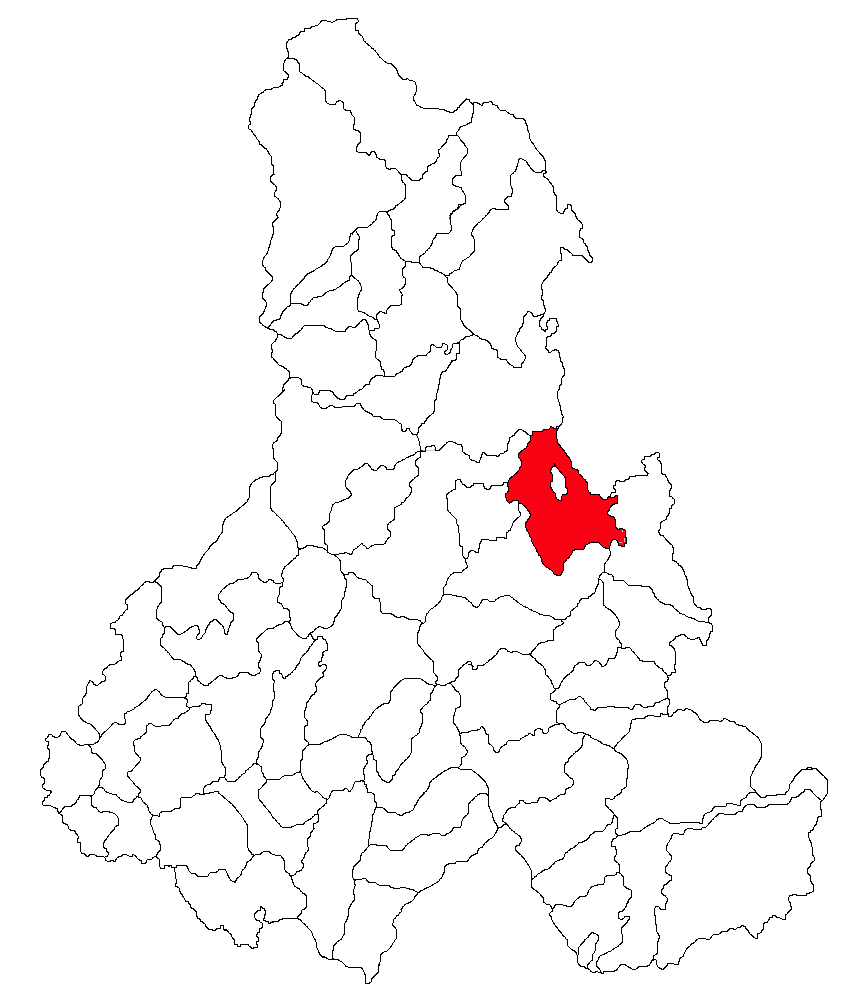
- Location in Harghita County

- Location in Romania
- Coordinates: 46°35′N 25°47′E
- Country: Romania
- County: Harghita

Government
  - Mayor (2020–2024): Róbert Karda (UDMR)
- Area: 158.65 km^{2} (61.26 sq mi)
- Population (2021-12-01): 5,667
  - Density: 35.72/km^{2} (92.51/sq mi)
- Time zone: UTC+02:00 (EET)
  - Summer (DST): UTC+03:00 (EEST)
- Postal code: 537275
- Area code: +40 266
- Vehicle reg.: HR

Sândominic (Hungarian: Csíkszentdomokos, Hungarian pronunciation: [ˈtʃiːksɛntdomokoʃ]) is a commune in Harghita County, Romania. It lies in the Székely Land, an ethno-cultural region in eastern Transylvania. It is composed of a single village, Sândominic.

== Demographics ==
At the 2011 census, the commune had a population of 6,110; out of them, 97% were Hungarian, 1.4% were Roma and 0.4% were Romanian. 97% of the commune population are Roman Catholic, 0.4% are Orthodox, 0.4% are Reformed and 0.1% are Unitarian.

The name Sândominic is used for most official purposes, but the population usually uses the shortened form Domokos.

== Location ==
Sândominic is located in the upper reaches of the Olt valley, 29 kilometres north of Miercurea Ciuc. The mountain pass to the northwest, leading to the village of Izvoru Mureșului (Hungarian: Marosfő) and on to the large town of Gheorgheni, marks the northern boundary of the traditional region of Felcsík.

The northern reaches of the village follow the descent of the river Olt to the village centre. Within the village limits, the Lok and Szádakút brooks meet the river, which then flows south to the village of Tomeşti. In 1967, the northern village of Bălan, long a part of the commune but by then more populous than the central village, gained official town status and was separated from Sândominic; however, the two settlements still share important economic and transport links.

The village is served by the Izvorul Olt station of Romanian State Railways, on the Războieni-Târgu Mureș-Deda-Miercurea Ciuc-Sfântu Gheorghe-Brașov line.

== History ==
There is evidence of Székely settlement on the site of Sândominic in the 14th century. In the Middle Ages, the village was the site of iron and copper mining (a tradition carried on until very recently in Bălan.) The name Zent Damokos appears in a document from 1567. The village gained notoriety for an incident of 3 November 1599 at the field of Pásztorbükk. On this day, Székely irregulars, allied in the Long War with Michael the Brave (Romanian: Mihai Viteazul) against the Hungarian nobility, killed the Cardinal András Báthory, Prince of Transylvania, who was retreating to Poland after being defeated in the Battle of Șelimbăr. The murderers were Mihály András Kristály and Balázs Nagy (later nicknamed Balázs Ördög – 'Balázs the Devil') and they were executed for their deed. Pope Clement VIII responded by placing the whole village under interdict. A Memorial Cross was erected in 1816. Its location is at a distance of 5.5 km north of town, on south-eastern slope of the hill Fagul Ciobanului (1108 m)

The village administratively belonged to Csíkszék, then, from 1876 until 1918 to the Csík County of the Kingdom of Hungary. In 1920, Sândominic, like the rest of Transylvania, formally passed with the Treaty of Trianon from Hungarian to Romanian control. The region passed again to Hungary with the 1940 Treaty of the Belvedere (also known as the Second Vienna Award). In 1944, the village was the site of particularly bloody reprisals by Romanian irregulars participating in the recapture of Transylvania from this Hungarian control; a small monument in the village's central square bears witness to the 14 victims, among them an 86-year-old woman. After World War II, it came under Romanian administration and became part of Romania in 1947. Between 1952 and 1960, it formed part of the Hungarian Autonomous Province, then, of the Mureș-Hungarian Autonomous Province until it was abolished in 1968. Since then, the commune is part of Harghita County.

== Religious sites and buildings ==
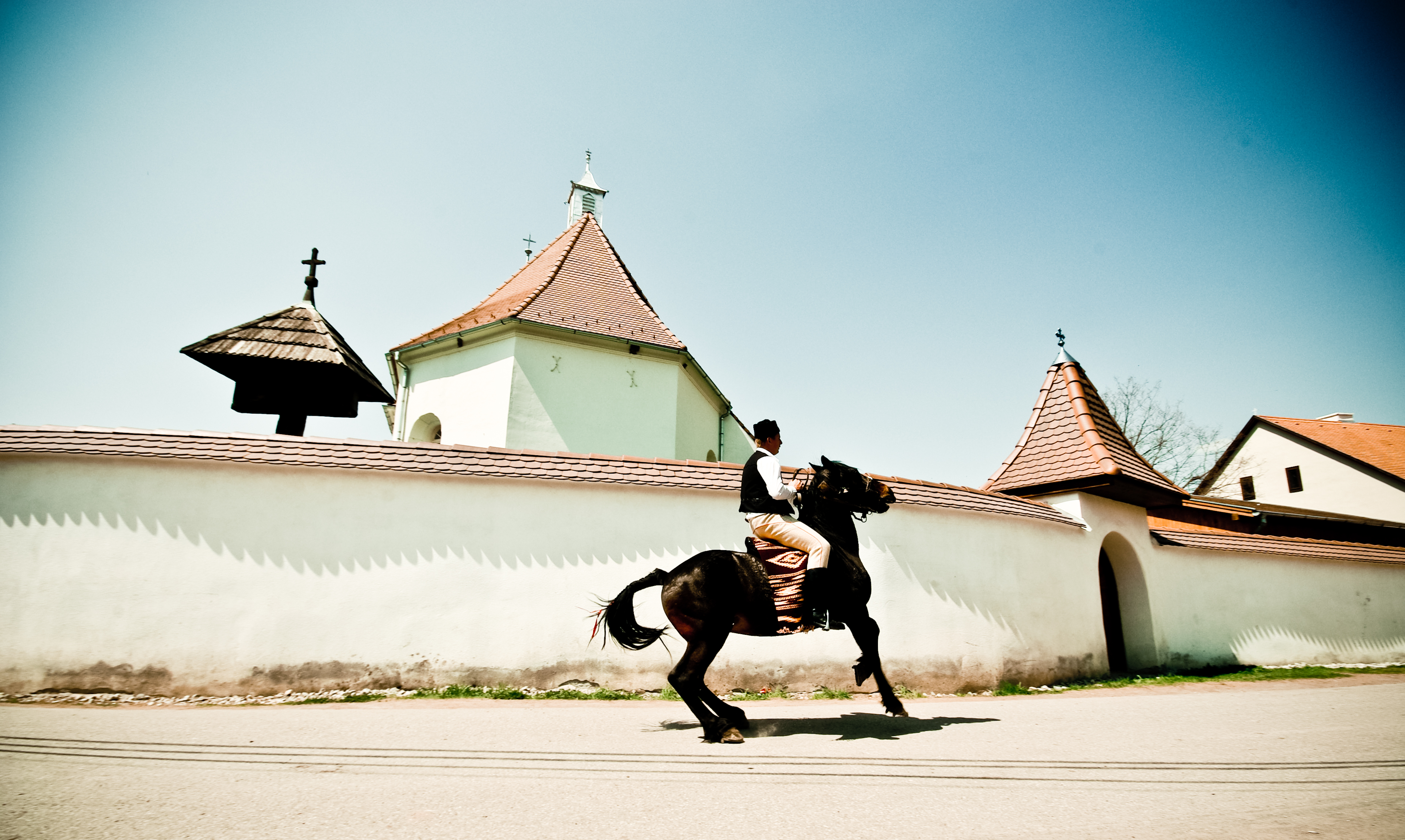
St. Dominic Roman Catholic church

Sândominic's Roman Catholic church was constructed between 1787 and 1802, and still preserves numerous relics and treasures from the Middle Ages. A Greek Catholic church was completed in 1787, and there is also a small Romanian Orthodox church. Numerous chapels are scattered around the village, including the chapel at Pásztorbükk.

A small village museum, containing historic farm equipment, costumes and weaponry, has been installed in the upper floor of the former House of Culture. The lower floor retains its function as a meeting-hall and often hosts musical and theatrical events.

Examples of the famous "Székely gates," richly carved wooden gates often several metres in height, can be seen throughout the village. For this and other reasons, Sândominic has long attracted the attention of ethnologists and anthropologists.

== Twin town ==
- Taksony, Hungary, since 2022

== People ==
- Áron Márton (1896–1980), longstanding Roman Catholic bishop of Alba Iulia. Opposed deportation of Jews during the fascist period and resisted Romanian Communism. His house in the centre of the village is marked with a commemorative plaque.
- Gyárfás Kurkó (1909–1983), political writer, leader of the Hungarian People's Union, political prisoner under Communist rule.
