= Áron Márton =

Roman Catholic bishop (1896–1980)

Venerable Áron Márton
- Bishop Emeritus of Alba Iulia
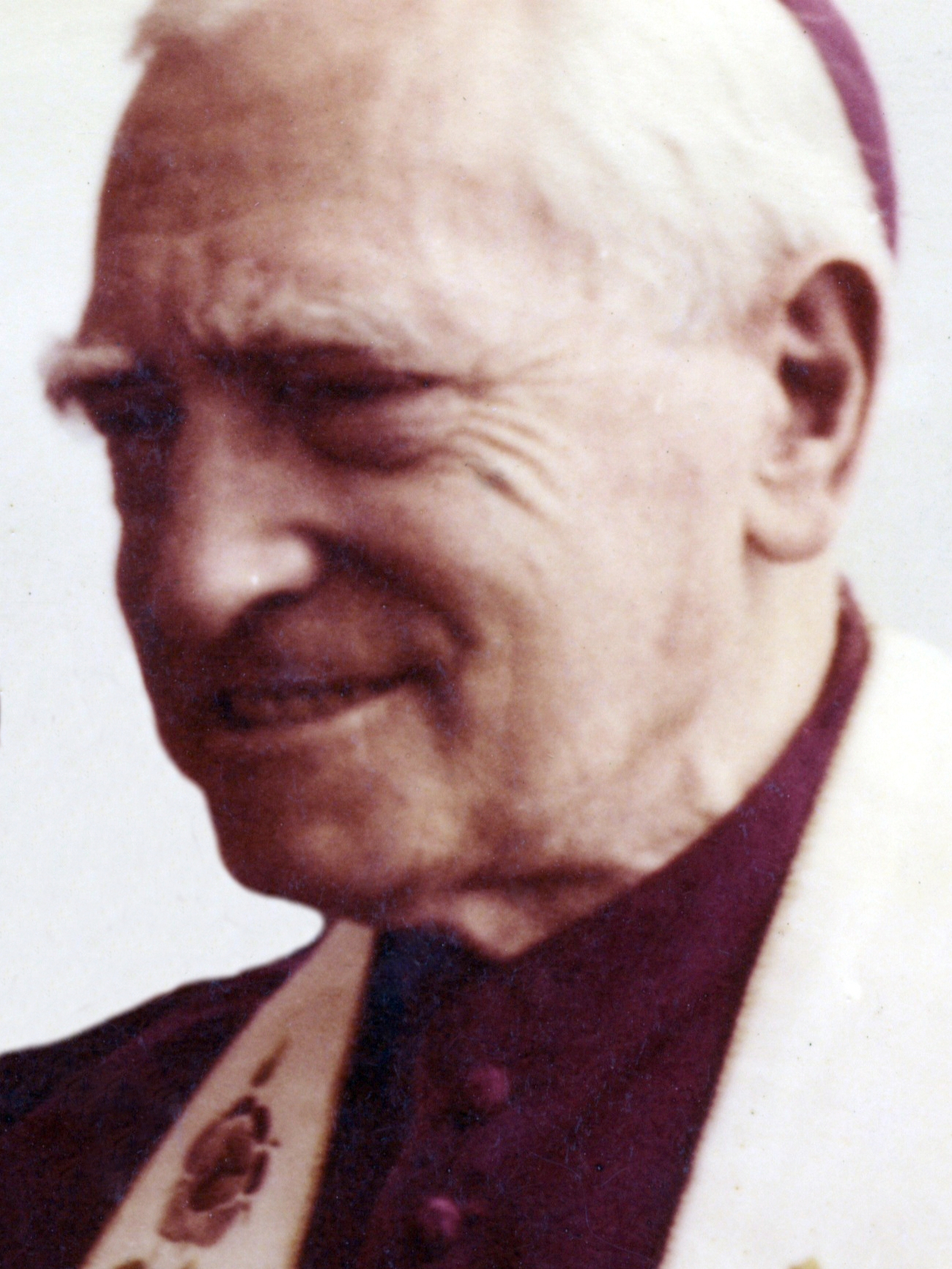
- Undated photograph.
- Church: Roman Catholic Church
- Diocese: Alba Iulia
- See: Alba Iulia
- Appointed: 24 December 1938
- Term ended: 2 April 1980
- Predecessor: Adolf Vorbuchner
- Successor: Antal Jakab
- Previous posts: Apostolic Administrator of Alba Iulia (1938); Apostolic Administrator of Oradea Mare (1939–41); President of the Romanian Episcopal Conference (1970–80)

Orders
- Ordination: 6 July 1924 by Gusztáv Károly Majláth
- Consecration: 12 February 1939 by Andrea Cassulo
- Rank: Archbishop

Personal details
- Born: Márton Áron; 28 August 1896 Csíkszentdomokos, Csík, Austria-Hungary
- Died: 29 September 1980 (aged 84) Alba Iulia, Romania
- Buried: Saint Michael's Cathedral, Alba Iulia, Romania
- Motto: Non Recuso Laborem ("I am not reluctant to work")
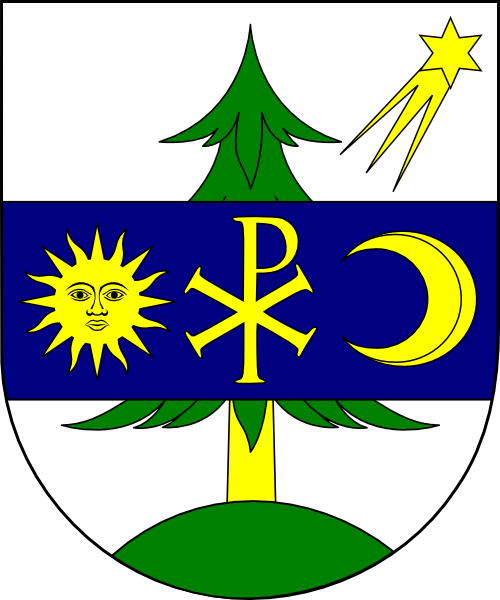
- Coat of arms

Áron Márton (28 August 1896 – 29 September 1980) was an ethnic Hungarian Roman Catholic prelate who served as the Bishop of Alba Iulia from his appointment in late 1938 until his resignation in 1980. He served as a prelate during a tumultuous period that included World War II and the emergence of a communist regime in Romania. He was even meant to become a cardinal but refused the honour when he learnt that another Romanian prelate would not be elevated into the cardinalate with him.

The Israeli Yad Vashem Institute honoured him on 27 December 1999 as a Righteous Among the Nations for his efforts to stop the deportation of Romanian and Hungarian Jews during the course of World War II.

Márton's cause for beatification opened on 17 November 1992 under Pope John Paul II, and he is titled as a Servant of God. On 18 December 2024, Pope Francis noted his heroic virtue and declared him venerable.

== Life ==
=== Education and conscription ===
Áron Márton was born in Csíkszentdomokos, Kingdom of Hungary, part of Austro-Hungarian Empire (now Sândominic, Romania) on 28 August 1896 to Szekler peasant parents Ágoston Márton and Julianna Kurkó.

His first went to primary school in his village from 1903 to 1906 before moving to a Roman Catholic school at Csíksomlyó from 1907 until 1911. He studied at another school in Csíkszereda from 1911 to 1914 before moving to a high school at Gyulafehérvár (now Alba Iulia, Romania). Right after graduating from high school in 1915, he was drafted into the Austro-Hungarian armed forces on 15 June. He was involved in battles of World War I as a lieutenant in the 82nd Infantry Regiment in different conflict zones and was injured several times (first at Doberdo and then at Oituz and Asiago). The conclusion of the war saw him find work as a farmer and as a metal worker in Brassó (now Brașov, Romania) from 1918 to 1920.

=== Priesthood ===
In 1920, he commenced his theology studies in Alba Iulia and soon after became a chaplain at Ditrău (Gyergyóditró; July 1924 - 1 July 1925) once he received his ordination to the priesthood in 1924 (in Alba Iulia) from Bishop Gusztáv Károly Majláth. Márton was then made a chaplain at Gheorgheni (Gyergyószentmiklós) on 1 July 1925 until being made a professor of religion in that town from 1926 to 1928. He later became a professor of theological studies in a range of different localities, and he taught at a high school from 1928 to 1929 in Mureș. Márton served as a priest at Turnu Roșu from 1 July 1929 to 1 October 1930. He was also a court chaplain and an archivist for the Diocese of Alba Iulia after 1930 before serving as a priest at the Cluj college. On 15 March 1936, he briefly worked as administrator of Saint Michael's parish in Cluj before becoming its pastor on 14 August 1938.

During the late 1930s, Márton was under the surveillance of the Siguranța due to his support for Hungarian irredentism. In various documents of the Siguranța, he was described as "a leading figure of Hungarian irredentism in Transylvania", as well as "an enemy of everything that is Romanian". Siguranța archives also point out that, in a 1942 speech, Áron Márton declared that the Second Vienna Award was unfair to the Hungarians, and that Hungary will eventually receive back the whole of Transylvania.

=== Episcopate ===
==== During fascist rule ====
On 24 December 1938, he was appointed as the Bishop of Alba Iulia in a decree that Pope Pius XI signed. He received his episcopal consecration in 1939, just after that pope's death from Andrea Cassulo, before he was enthroned in his new episcopal see. Márton was one of the first intellectuals to oppose the preparations for World War II in public, and he had started this in 1938, prior to his appointment as a bishop. He remained in the southern part of Transylvania, which remained part of Romania following the Second Vienna Award in 1940, unlike the northern part, which became part of Hungary. In a speech he gave in Saint Michael's Church – during a visit to Kolozsvár on 18 May 1944 (for the ordination of three new priests) – he condemned the prepared deportation of the Romanian and Hungarian Jews. That week, on 22 May, he also wrote letters to the Hungarian government as well as to the local police and other authorities requesting the prohibition of the deportation. But the response to his pleas was his expulsion to Alba Iulia.

==== During communist rule ====
In 1945 – after the death of Cardinal Jusztinián Serédi – Pope Pius XII wanted Márton to become the next cardinal for the Hungarian nation, therefore leading Serédi's vacant see. But the opposition of the Hungarian Communists saw another prelate chosen for the position.

Márton continued to be a strong advocate for religious freedom and human rights, which made him an opponent of the Romanian Communists and of the dictatorial regime that it had established in late 1947. The bishop was arrested on 21 June 1949 and was sentenced to life imprisonment in mid-1951; but in 1953 – with the change of the political climate in Romania – the circumstances of his imprisonment became more bearable. Pius XII in 1949 (while Márton was jailed) gave him the personal title of archbishop ("ad personam"), though he made no public announcement of this and informed Márton in a private letter. Márton was moved into a villa in the outskirts of Bucharest but was not allowed to have contact with the outside world. He was released in 1955.

Márton decided to revisit his bishopric after his release, where he received a grand welcome on the part of an enthusiastic crowd. This proved embarrassing for the authorities, and he was confined to house arrest following this. Márton was not allowed to leave the bishopric building for the decade and was permitted to emerge later in 1967. He was released as a result of negotiations that Cardinal Franz König had conducted in Bucharest. But Márton was still cautious of possible harassment from the authorities, and volunteers often accompanied him on his pastoral visitations to ensure he was safe and left alone. He served as the President of the Romanian Episcopal Conference from 1970 to 1980. In 1972, he was diagnosed with cancer. He travelled several times to Rome where he met with Pope Paul VI.

=== Death ===
Márton submitted his resignation from his diocese to Pope John Paul II, and the resignation was later accepted on 2 April 1980. He died not long after this, on 29 September, and was interred in the diocesan cathedral. During his battle with cancer, he had never taken painkillers and continued with his work with great resilience. He was granted the posthumous title "Righteous Among the Nations" from Yad Vashem in Israel on 27 December 1999 for his activities in defending the Jews during the war.

Márton's remains were exhumed from their original resting place in the crypt of St. Michael's Cathedral (Alba Iulia) and reinterred in a sarcophagus located in the main section of the cathedral on 29 September 2016.

== Cardinalate nomination ==
On 22 February 1969, a private audience was held between Pope Paul VI and Monsignor Hieronymus Menges. The latter asked the pope to do something that would encourage the Romanian faithful, and the pope asked, "What"? in response to what he could do. Menges recommended that the pope create both Márton and Iuliu Hossu as cardinals, as well as name several priests as monsignors.

Paul VI agreed and tasked the then-Archbishop Agostino Casaroli with seeing whether it would be acceptable to the Romanian government. Casaroli dispatched his aide to meet with the Minister for Culture in Bucharest to ask if the double appointment would be welcomed. The Minister assured the aide that Márton's appointment would be acceptable to them but that Hossu was an unacceptable choice. Márton himself learnt that he was to be made a cardinal but refused upon learning that the government had denied Hossu. But the pope circumvented the government: he named Hossu a cardinal "in pectore" and never made Márton a cardinal. Hossu's secret appointment was not made public until the pope did so on 5 March 1973, after Hossu's 1970 death.

== Beatification process ==
The beatification cause commenced on 17 November 1992 under Pope John Paul II after the Congregation for the Causes of Saints issued the nihil obstat and titled Márton a Servant of God. The diocesan phase of the investigation was opened in Alba Iulia on 26 July 1994 and was later closed on 5 December 1996. The documentation was forwarded to the Congregation for the Causes of Saints in Rome, which validated the process on 23 October 1998. Theologians approved the cause on 25 June 2010. On 18 December 2024, Pope Francis approved a decree recognizing Márton's heroic virtues, bestowing him with the title "the Venerable". The postulator for this cause is Monsignor Gergely Kovács.

== Gallery ==
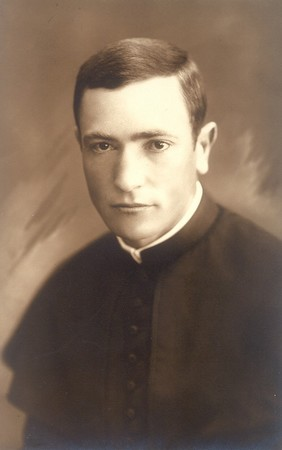
Márton circa 1920

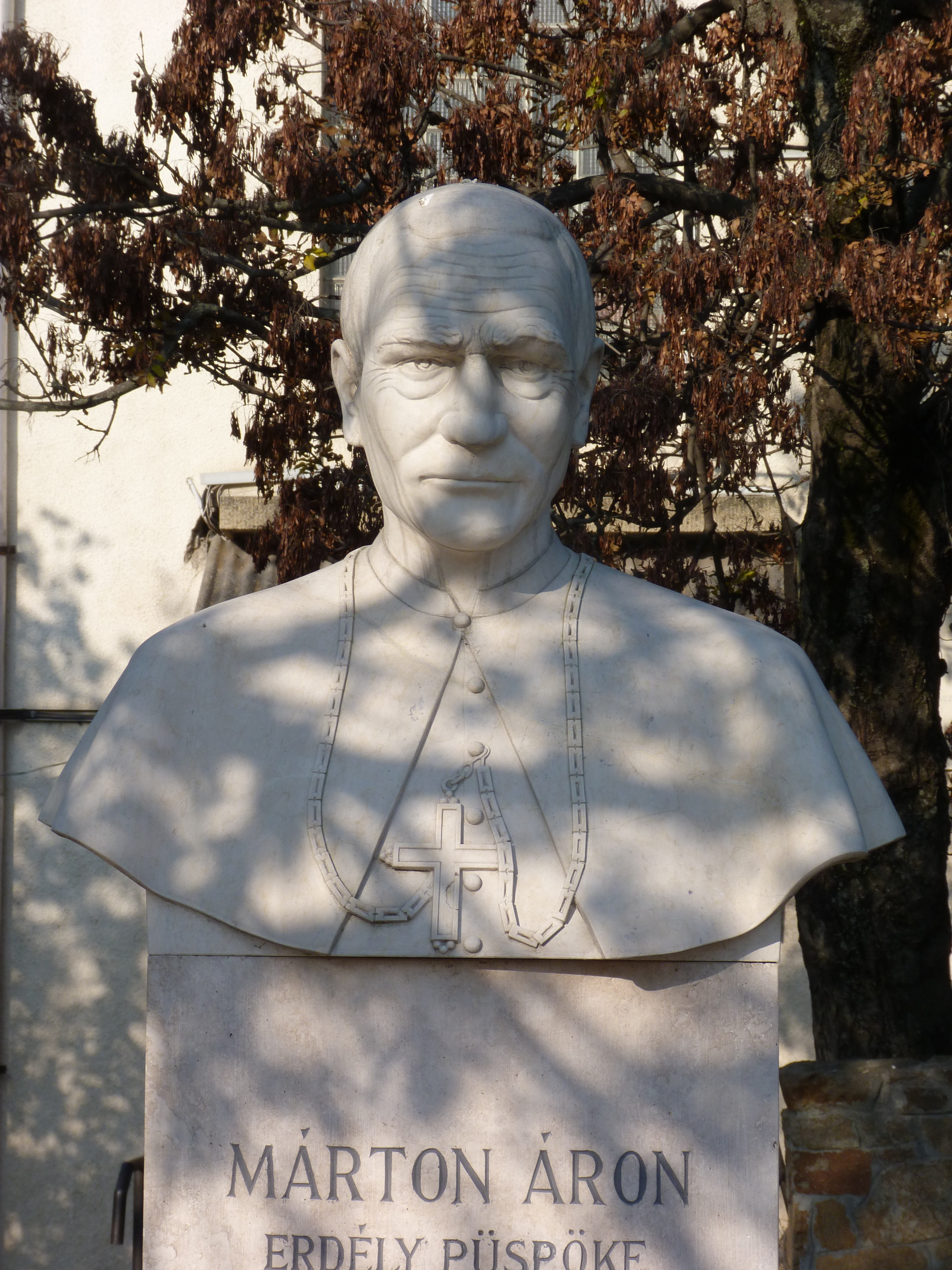
Portrait bust in Áron Márton Square, Budapest

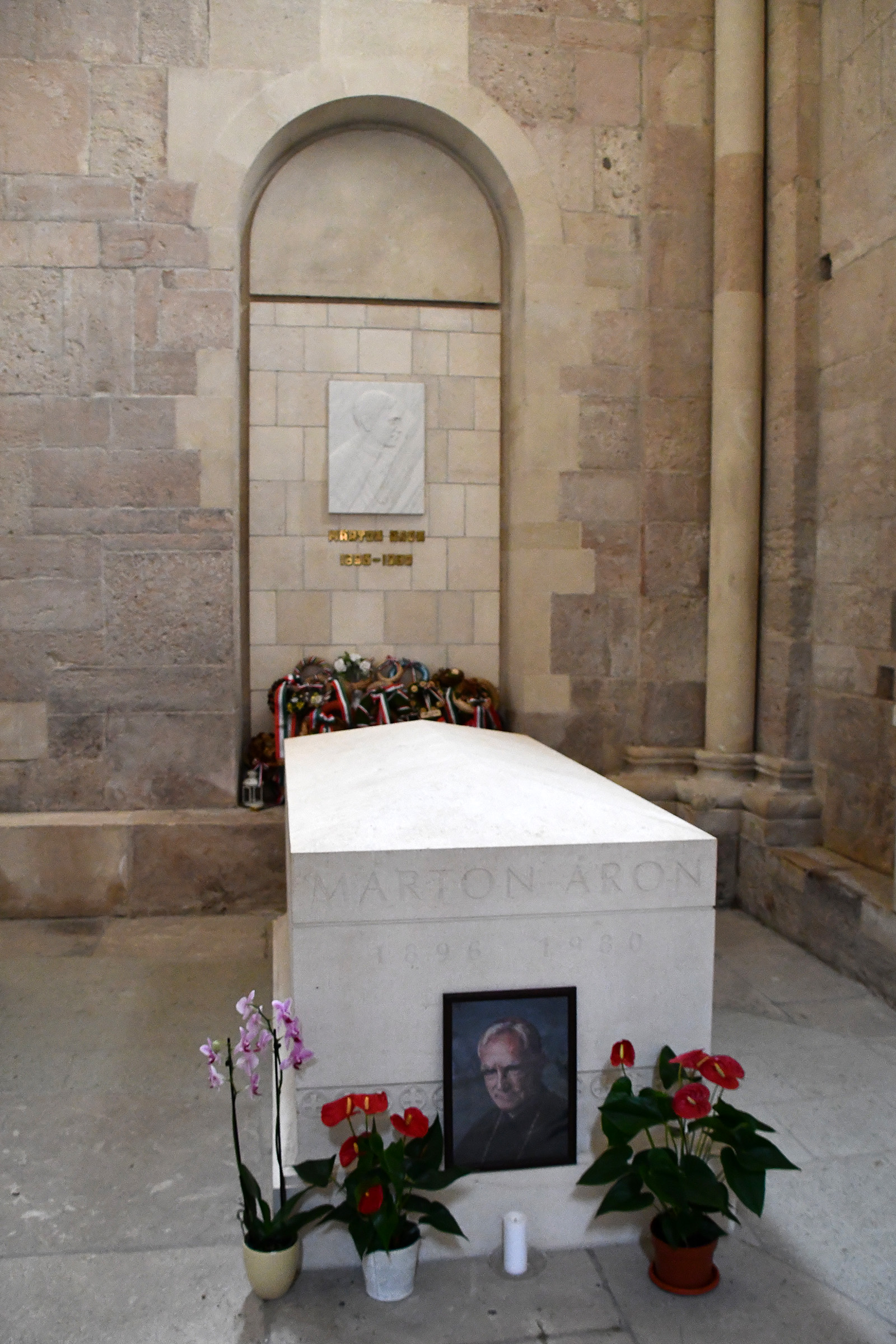
Sarcophagus of Áron Márton in St. Michael's Cathedral, Alba Iulia, after the reinternment of his remains in 2016

== See also ==
- Holocaust in Hungary
