= Márton Áron National College =

National college in Romania

Coordinates: 46.3676°N 25.8069°E

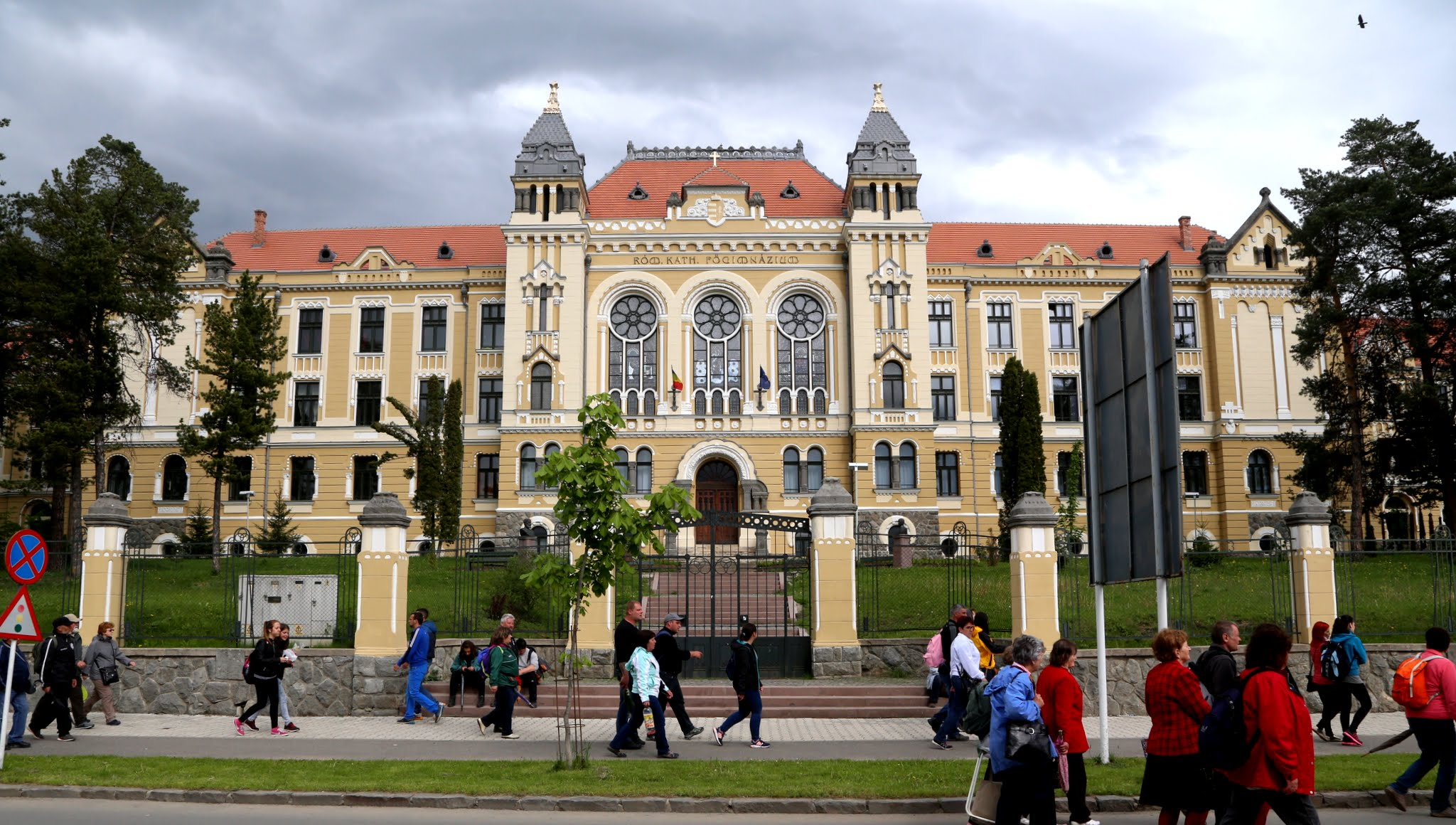
Márton Áron National College

Márton Áron National College (Romanian: Colegiul Național Márton Áron; Hungarian: Márton Áron Főgimnázium) is a high school located at 72 Márton Áron Street, Miercurea Ciuc, Romania.

== Origins and early years ==
The school traces its origins to the Roman Catholic gymnasium founded at Șumuleu Ciuc by Franciscan friars in the mid-18th century. The facilities of this building had become obsolete by the late 19th century, when a move into Miercurea Ciuc was proposed. A debate went on from 1895, with supporters of a move arguing on grounds of hygiene and modernization, while opponents pleaded that Șumuleu was a more pristine place. Finally, the move was approved in 1900 and architect Ignác Alpár was tasked with drawing up plans. The initial proposal was drawn up in 1902, land donated in 1905 and financing settled in 1907: funds would come from Csík County, from the Hungarian government and from the Catholic Church. The project was handed over to Sándor Pápai; the extent to which each architect contributed to the final result is a matter of debate.

The cornerstone was laid in May 1909, and the building was inaugurated in June 1911 by Count Gusztáv Károly Majláth, bishop of Transylvania. The right (south) wing, meant for a seminary, was finished in 1913. The left (north) wing was a dormitory with twelve bedrooms, eight study rooms and other features. The building was very modern for its time, but World War I began a few years after its opening, and it was partly transformed into a military hospital. Furniture and books were destroyed, statues disappeared, the chemistry laboratory was left empty, the coin and antiques collection was decimated. Courses stopped entirely for the 1916-1917 year.

== Subsequent developments and architecture ==
The end of the war and the union of Transylvania with Romania brought about changes: an elementary school moved into the building, while in 1923–1931, and again in 1941–1942, a teacher training school operated inside the left wing. After its 1931 departure, the boarding area and seminary were merged, running independently in the wings. School life was disrupted under Hungarian rule during World War II: in 1943–1944, the building was used as a hospital and offices, equipment damaged and teachers forced to move into the gymnasium and art room. That year, classes started in November and finished on April 1. In its first three decades, school operations were largely financed through foundation grants.

In 1948, the new Romanian communist regime nationalized the school. The chapel became a functions hall, while three large stained-glass panels were removed; these depicted the Virgin Mary, Saint Stephen and Saint Emeric. The panels were reconstructed in 2008. Commemorative plaques along the hallways describing the building's history, and a bust of Bishop Majláth, were also removed. In 1990, the school was named after Bishop Áron Márton, a former student. A Catholic theological high school opened in the same building in 1991. The school was declared a national college in 2015.

The building features three wings. The central one is the high school proper, and is the most prominent. It has a mansard roof between two towers. The main facade is decorated in a variety of styles: Romanesque, Gothic and Baroque Revival, as well as Art Nouveau. Its most striking element are the massive windows, which recall those of medieval churches. The main entrance is Romanesque in its three pairs of miniature stone columns and arch, while the latter is worked in Baroque, with its stucco beads and shells. Meanwhile, its wavy edge is characteristic of Art Nouveau. The building is listed as a historic monument by Romania's Ministry of Culture and Religious Affairs.
