= Csík County =

County of the Kingdom of Hungary

Csík County Comitatus Csikiensis (Latin) Csík vármegye (Hungarian) Komitat Tschick (German) Comitatul Ciuc (Romanian)
- County of the Kingdom of Hungary (1876-1920, 1940-1945)
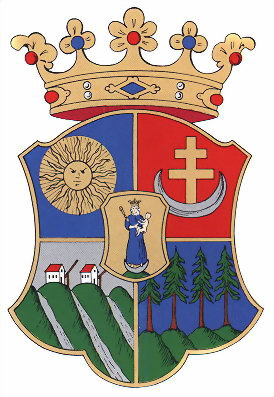
- Coat of arms

- Capital: Csíkszereda
- Area
  - Coordinates: 46°22′N 25°48′E
  - 1910: 4,859 km^{2} (1,876 sq mi)
- Population
  - 1910: 145,720
- History
  - Established: 1876
  - Treaty of Trianon: 4 June 1920
  - County recreated (Second Vienna Award): 30 August 1940
  - Disestablished: 1945
- Today part of: Romania
- Miercurea Ciuc is the current name of the capital.

Csík (Hungarian, in Romanian: Ciuc) was an administrative county (comitatus) of the Kingdom of Hungary. Its territory is now in central Romania (eastern Transylvania). The capital of the county was Csíkszereda (now Miercurea Ciuc).

== Geography ==
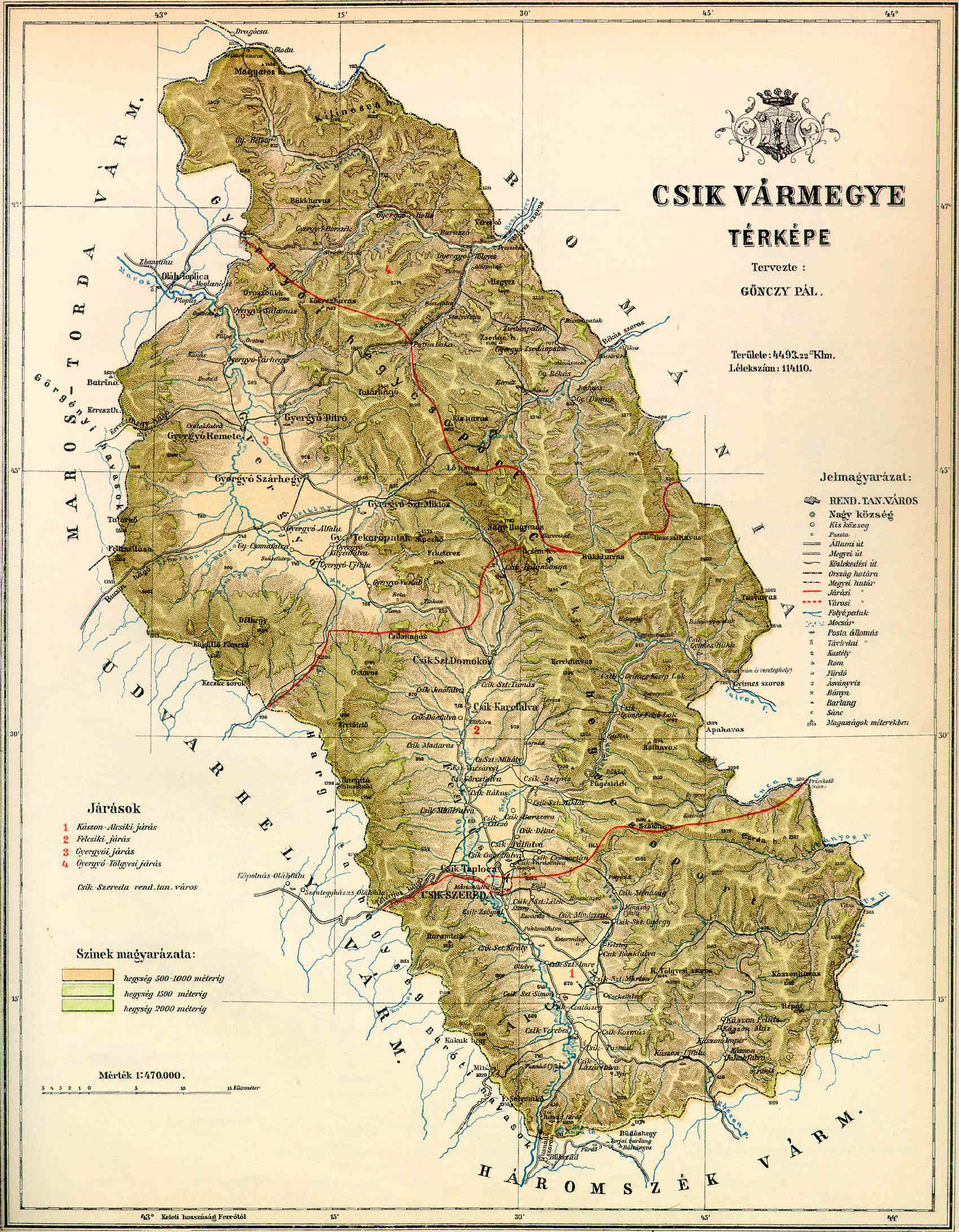
Map of Csík, 1891.

Csík county shared borders with Kingdom of Romania and the Hungarian counties of Beszterce-Naszód, Maros-Torda, Udvarhely and Háromszék. The county was situated in the Carpathian Mountains, around the sources and upper courses of the rivers Olt and Mureș. Its area was 4,859 km^{2} around 1910.

== History ==
Csík county consisted of three former seats of the Székelys: Csíkszék, Gyergyószék and Kászonszék (the latter two as filial seats of the former). It was formed in 1876, when the administrative structure of Transylvania was changed. In 1920, by the Treaty of Trianon, the county became part of Romania. It was returned to Hungary by the Second Vienna Award of 1940. After World War II, it became again part of Romania. Most of its territory lies in the present-day Romanian county of Harghita, with small parts in Suceava, Neamț and Bacău.

== Demographics ==
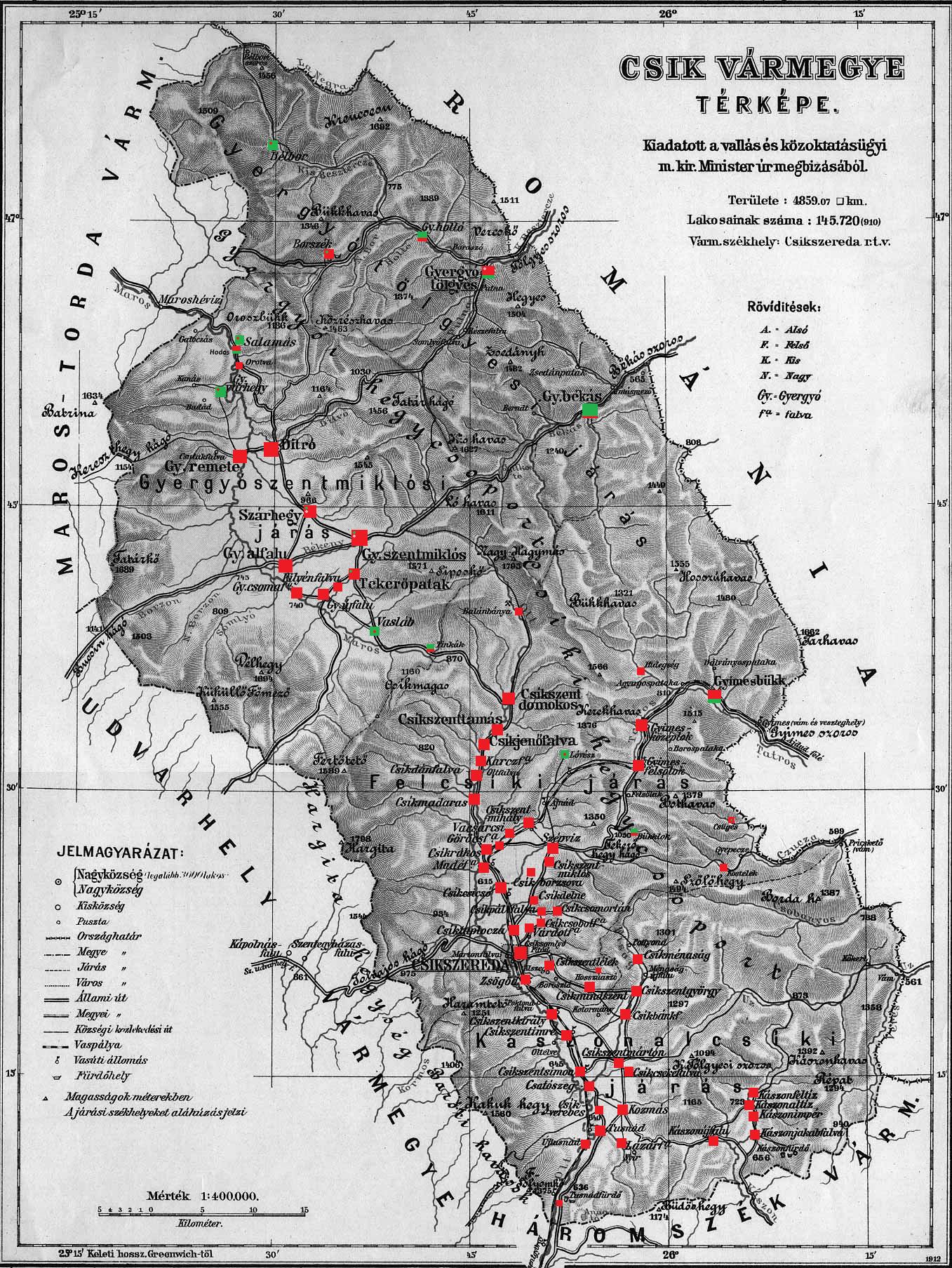
Ethnic map of the county with data of the 1910 census (see the key in the description)

Population by mother tongue (Note: Only linguistic communities > 1% are displayed.)
Census	Total	Hungarian	Romanian	Other or unknown
1880	110,940	92,802 (86.92%)	12,836 (12,02%)	1,135 (1.06%)
1890	114,110	98,861 (86.64%)	14,470 (12.68%)	779 (0.68%)
1900	128,382	110,963 (86.43%)	15,936 (12.41%)	1,483 (1.16%)
1910	145,720	125,888 (86.39%)	18,032 (12.37%)	1,800 (1.24%)

Population by religion (Note: Only religious communities > 1% are displayed.)
Census	Total	Roman Catholic	Greek Catholic	Jewish	Calvinist	Other or unknown
1880	110,940	91,627 (82.59%)	17,485 (15.76%)	528 (0.48%)	321 (0.29%)	979 (0.88%)
1890	114,110	93,415 (81.86%)	18,532 (16.24%)	706 (0.62%)	465 (0.41%)	992 (0.87%)
1900	128,382	104,287 (81.23%)	21,100 (16.44%)	1,518 (1.18%)	956 (0.74%)	521 (0.41%)
1910	145,720	117,351 (80.53%)	23,724 (16.28%)	2,357 (1.62%)	1,689 (1.16%)	599 (0.41%)

== Subdivisions ==
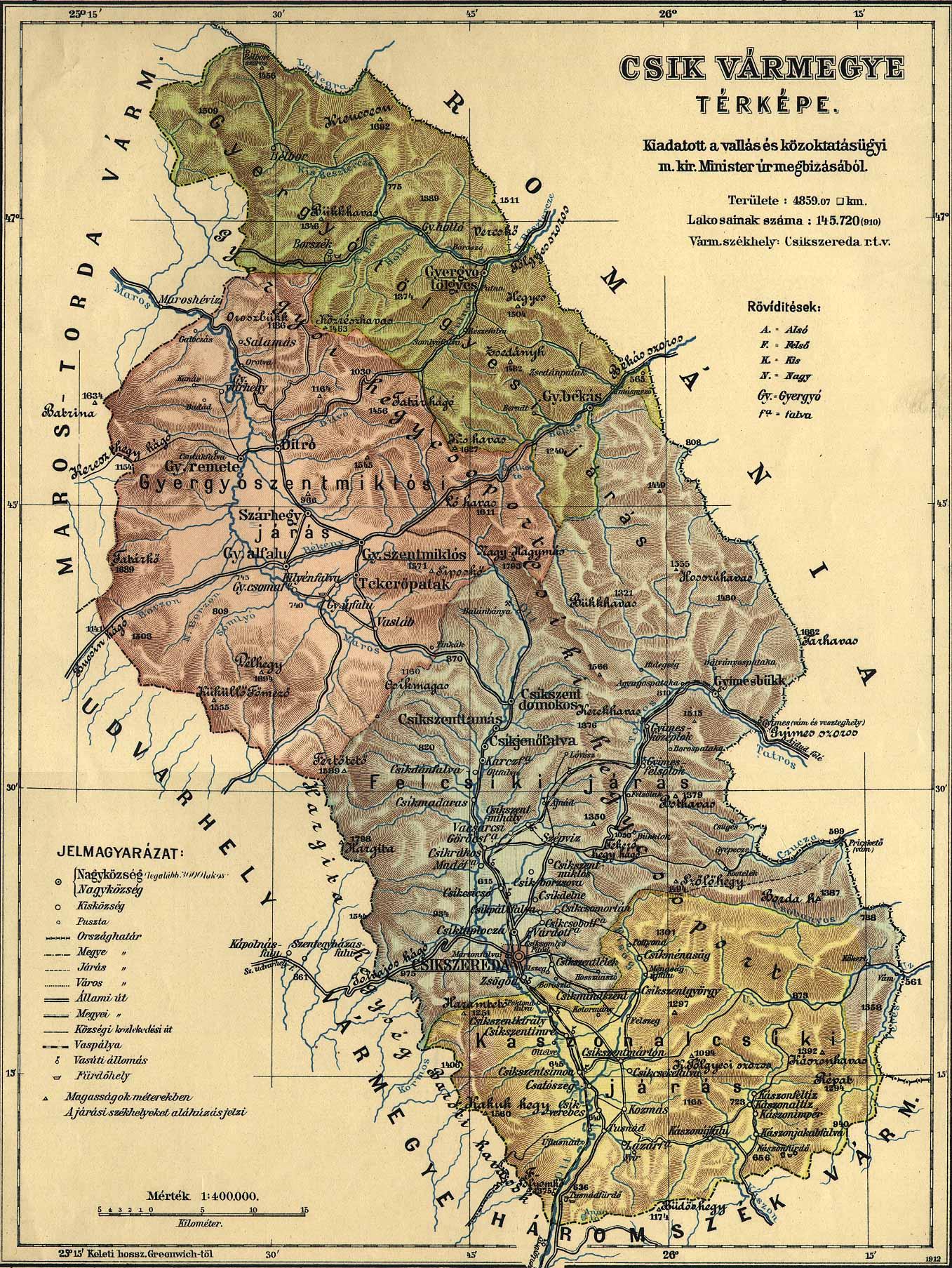
Contemporary map of the county

In the early 20th century, the subdivisions of Csík county were:

Districts (járás)
District	Capital
Felcsík	Csíkszereda (now Miercurea Ciuc)
Gyergyószentmiklós	Gyergyószentmiklós (now Gheorgheni)
Gyergyótölgyes	Gyergyótölgyes (now Tulgheș)
Kászonalcsík	Csíkszentmárton (now Sânmartin)
Szépvíz (from 1913)	Szépvíz (now Frumoasa)
Urban districts (rendezett tanácsú város)
Csíkszereda (now Miercurea Ciuc)
Gyergyószentmiklós (now Gheorgheni)

== See also ==
- Harghita County of Romania
