= Devlet I Giray =

Khan of Crimea from 1551 to 1577

- Taht Algan (The Winner of the Throne)
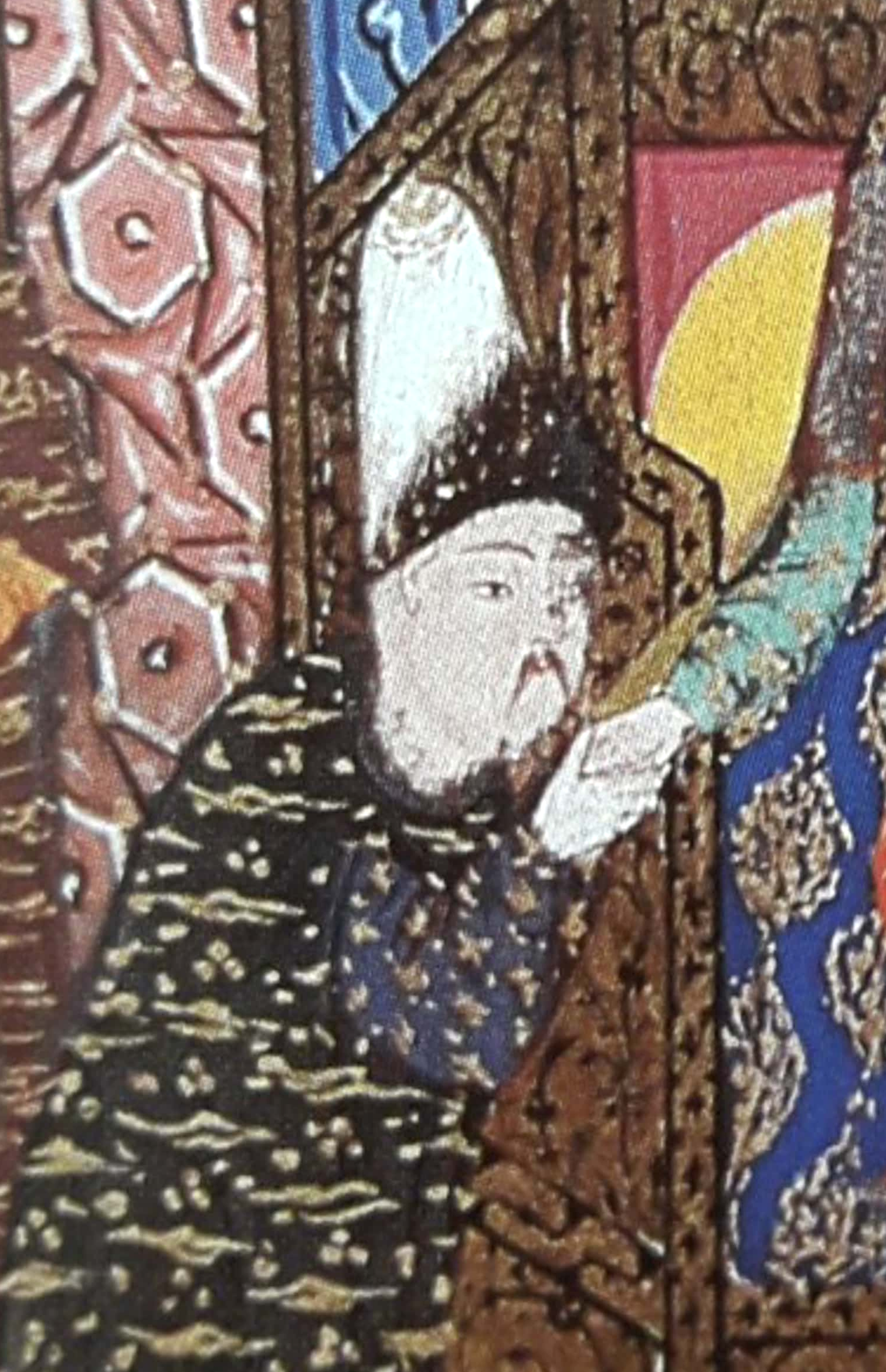
- Devlet Giray. Süleymannâme (16th century)

Khan of Kazan (pretender)
- Reign: 1549–1551
- Predecessor: Safa Giray of Kazan
- Successor: Shahghali

Khan of Crimea
- Reign: 1551–1577
- Predecessor: Sahib I Giray
- Successor: Mehmed II Giray
- Born: 1512
- Died: 25 June 1577 (aged 64–65); Bakhchysarai
- Dynasty: Giray dynasty
- Father: Mübârek Giray
- Religion: Islam

Devlet I Giray (1512–1577, r. 1551–1577, Crimean Tatar: I Devlet Geray, دولت كراى; Taht Alğan Devlet Geray, تخت آلغان دولت كراى) was Khan of Crimea from 1551 to 1577. Events during his reign included the fall of Kazan to Russia in 1552, the fall of the Astrakhan Khanate to Russia in 1556, and the burning of Moscow by the Crimean Tatars in 1571. Another notable event was the defeat of the Crimeans near Moscow in 1572. Cossack raids into the Crimea were also common during his reign.

== Early life and enthronement ==
Devlet was the son of Mubarek Giray and the grandson of Meñli I Giray (1478–1515). After Meñli's death, the throne was held by Mubarek’s brothers and their sons until Devlet's accession. Thus, Devlet belonged to a collateral branch. Mubarek served Sultan Selim I and died fighting in Egypt in 1516–17. Devlet became Kalga to his uncle Saadet I Giray (1524–1532) in 1530. After Saadet's abdication in 1532, Devlet was imprisoned and followed his uncle to Istanbul. Girays in the Turkish military had the potential to become Crimean Khans. In 1551, Sahib I Giray refused a Turkish order to fight in Persia, leading to his replacement by Devlet. The Crimean army swore allegiance to Devlet, and Sahib was subsequently captured and executed. On Devlet's orders, Sahib's children and grandchildren were also executed.

== Reign ==
=== Losing Kazan ===
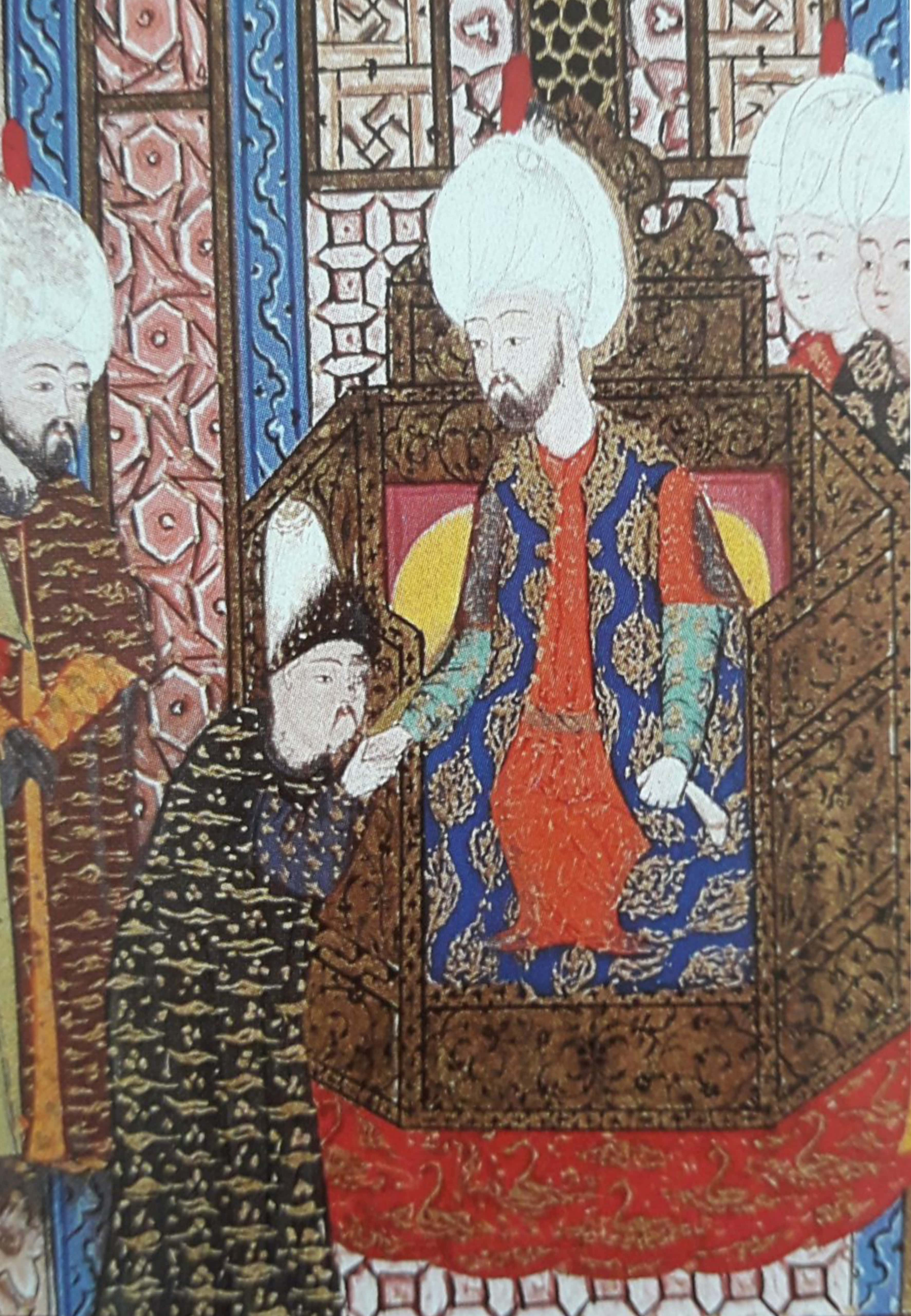
Devlet I Giray paying hommage to Ottoman Sultan Suleiman I in 1551.

The rulers of Kazan from the Crimean Giray dynasty were anti-Russian and pro-independence, namely Sahib I Giray, Safa Giray of Kazan, and Ötemish Giray. In 1551 they were replaced by the pro-Russian Shahgoli with the support of Russia. The Kazanians soon overthrew Shahgoli. Upon learning of the expulsion of Shahghali from Kazan, Ivan launched a major campaign against the Khanate in March 1552. Learning that the Muscovite army was absent, Devlet made the strategic decision to attack, ensuring an easy victory while securing Kazan. As Devlet approached Ryazan, he learned that Ivan was patiently waiting for him at Kolomna. Although Devlet decided to retreat, his men were unwilling to return empty-handed, and he was forced to lay siege to Tula on 21 June. After two days, the advancing Russian army and an attack by the besieged garrison forced the Tatars to retreat. As a result of the attack, all the Turkish artillery and wagons fell victim to the Russians. Finally, in October of the same year, the Kazan Khanate was conquered by Russia.

=== Losing Astrakhan ===
After the fall of Kazan, Yamghurchi of Astrakhan broke with Russia and formed an alliance with Crimea. Devlet sent 13 cannons, but no soldiers. In the spring of 1554, Ivan sent 33,000 soldiers down the Volga, expelled Yamghurchi, and appointed Dervish Ali Astrakhani in his place. Dervish then broke the alliance with Russia and allied himself with Crimea. Devlet provided some cannons, advisors, 300 Janissaries and 700 Crimeans. In 1556, Russia expelled Dervish and conquered Astrakhan.

Meanwhile, in the steppe, Ismail had a conflict with his elder brother, Yusuf Bey, who was the father of the unfortunate Söyembikä of Kazan. Ismail sought the support of the Turks, but the Sultan referred the matter to the Crimeans who were in charge of steppe affairs. Devlet refused, prompting Ismail to approach Moscow and propose a joint attack on Astrakhan to place his protégé, Dervish Ali, on the throne. Ismail's cavalry was to rendezvous with Russian ships on the Volga, but he failed to appear due to a battle with his brother Yusuf. As a result, the Russians took control of Astrakhan in his absence. Ismail eliminated Yusuf and assumed leadership of the Nogais. Kazi-Mirza united those who opposed the pro-Russian family conflict and formed the Small Nogai Horde, a close ally of Crimea, in the Kuban region.

=== Further wars against Russia ===
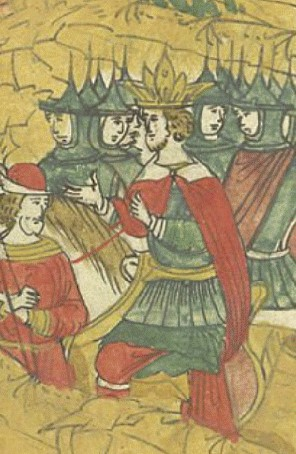
Devlet Giray (on the horse) and his army during his campaign against Tula in the 16th century Illustrated Chronicle of Ivan the Terrible

Around this time, Russia briefly became involved in the North Caucasus. In the spring of 1555, Devlet led an army into the North Caucasus to deal with Circassians who had defected to the Russians. When Ivan learned of this, he sent 13,000 men under Sheremetev and Saltykov south to Perekop. On the way, they discovered that Devlet had changed direction, intending to attack Ryazan to the north. Ivan strengthened the Oka bank line, while Devlet withdrew and met Sheremetev at Sudbishchi, about 150 km south of Tula. Sheremetev seized his supply wagons, and Devlet launched an attack that resulted in heavy casualties, including his sons Kalga Akhmed Geray and Haji Geray. After that, Mehmed, another son of Devlet, went north and defeated Sheremetev. As a result, the Crimeans returned home.

In the spring of 1556, Devlet's third attack on Moscow failed. In January 1558, he sent his eldest son Kalga Mehmed Geray with 100,000 soldiers to attack Tula, Ryazan, and Kashira. When they discovered a concentration of Russian troops on the Oka River, they retreated. Though pursued by Russian forces to the Oskol River, they managed to evade capture. In May–June 1562, Devlet sent 15,000 soldiers on a raid through Mtsensk, Odoev, Novosil, Bolkhov, Cherny, and Belyov. In the spring of 1563, Devlet's sons Mehmed and Adil led raids in Dedilov, Pronsk, and Ryazan. In October 1564, Devlet and his two sons raided Ryazan for six days. In the fall of 1565, Devlet led a small army to raid Bolkhov, but they were repulsed. After the Astrakhan campaign of 1569, Devlet's sons Mehmed and Adil Geray devastated the regions around Ryazan and Kashira in the spring of 1570.

After his unsuccessful efforts, Devlet tried to make peace with Moscow, but his nobles refused.

=== Cossack invasions ===
Dmytro Vyshnevetsky was transforming the Zaporozhian Cossacks into an effective military force. In 1556, Devlet led his army into Circassia, but quickly turned back when he discovered that pro-Russian Cossacks were descending the Dnieper and Don rivers. The Cossacks destroyed Islyam-Kerman/Kakhovka, then took the city’s cannons back to Khortytsia. Then they attacked Ak-Chum/Ochakov and Kerch, but retreated at the approach of Devlet's army.

In the spring of 1557, Devlet besieged Vishnevetsky and the Zaporozhian Cossacks in Khortytsia. After 24 days he was forced to retreat.

In 1558, Vishnevetsky, the Zaporozhian Cossacks, and 5,000 Russian soldiers took ships to the lower Don, raided deep into Crimean territory, besieged Azak/Azov, and defeated a Crimean army. At the same time, 8,000 Russians under Adashev went down the Dnieper, raided the west coast of Crimea, plundered villages, and freed many prisoners from Russia and Lithuania. The captured Turks were released because they were not in conflict with the Sultan.

Ismail repeatedly tried to break through Perekop during this period. Many Nogai from the mainland fled to the Crimea or joined Ismail. There were also droughts that caused famine and outbreaks of plague. When Vishnevetsky defected from Ivan and Ivan focused on the Livonian War (1558–1563), the pressure eased.

=== Ottoman attack on Astrakhan ===
As early as 1563, the Ottoman Empire formulated an ambitious plan to regain control of Astrakhan, reopen the trade and pilgrimage route north of the Caspian Sea, and build a canal between the Don and Volga rivers to transport ships from the Black Sea to the Caspian Sea and launch an attack on Persia. Devlet resented the prospect of being encircled by Turkish-held territories and took various steps to discourage the Sultan.

On 31 May 1569, Kasim Pasha went to Astrakhan with 15,000 janissaries, thousands of other Turkish soldiers, and 30,000 workers to dig the canal. He was accompanied by 40 to 50 thousand troops of Devlet. They traveled up the Don River to the point where the rivers were closest and began digging. Soon it became clear that the canal was not feasible. There was no way to transport boats and artillery across the steppe, so the artillery was sent downriver. Kasim initially planned to leave, but after hearing rumors of available ships on the Volga, he crossed the steppe and ventured into Astrakhan. Although the city was easily accessible, taking the fortress was impossible without artillery. Despite the possibility of waiting for supplies to arrive in the spring, the troops had only enough food to last for 40 days and became rebellious at the idea of spending the winter in tents on the steppe. On 26 September, Kasim abandoned the siege and moved west. They encountered harassment from Circassian tribes and a Russian army stationed to the south. The Crimean and Nogai cavalry were moderately successful, but the infantry faced immense hardships on the arid steppe. In addition, a significant portion of the naval forces were destroyed in a storm at Azov.

=== Fire of Moscow ===
In the spring of 1571, after earlier failed attempts along the Oka River, Devlet led 40,000 men north to attack Kozelsk and Bolkhov, south of the west bank of the Oka. As he approached Moscow, he encountered six boyars who had fled from Ivan the Terrible. They promised to give an unguarded area along the Oka River to the Tatars and claimed that most of the Russian army was in Livonia. In addition, the country was weakened by crop failures and plague. When Devlet crossed the Oka, Ivan fled to Rostov. By 24 May, Devlet was near Moscow, commanding raiding parties. A fire broke out in Moscow, and a strong wind aggravated it, resulting in the complete destruction of the city within a few hours. Those who fled the fire were captured. Devlet then traveled back to Crimea, taking more prisoners along the way. In total, tens of thousands of Russians were killed and 150,000 were enslaved.

=== Battle of Molodi ===
There was some discussion about diplomatic advantage after the unexpected victory, but Devlet decided to launch a decisive attack. By 5 August, he commanded 120,000 troops at the Oka River—including 80,000 Crimeans and Nogais, 33,000 Turks, and 7,000 janissaries. A detachment of Nogais crossed the river and the rest of the army followed. Ivan fled to Novgorod, while the troops on the Oka pursued Devlet and prevented his escape. Devlet ordered his troops to concentrate on capturing Ivan and ignore any other distractions. His sons, Mehmed and Adil, disobeyed and launched an attack on the Russians that ultimately led to their defeat. In response, Devlet sent 10,000 Nogai soldiers to engage the Russians, but they were unable to withstand the artillery fire. Devlet then stopped pursuing the enemy and instead redirected his large army to block the advancing Russians. The Russians then split into groups and surrounded each with gulyay-gorods. The initial skirmish proved even until the Russians captured Deve-Bey, the leader of the Nogais. Devlet planned to starve the gulyay-gorods into submission, but the Nogais, without a leader, insisted on immediate action, forcing Devlet's hand. The final confrontation came on 11 August. When the cavalry stormed the fortifications, the walls collapsed, exposing the artillery and musketeers. The Tatars retreated, only to be ambushed by a Russian unit that outflanked them. Casualties were even higher than the day before, with Devlet losing a son and a grandson. At the same time, the Tatars intercepted a message from Ivan claiming that he was approaching with a massive force. The message was a trick, and Devlet was deceived. As a result, he withdrew his army and suffered heavy casualties. Reports indicate that between 5,000 and 20,000 troops survived.

=== Death ===
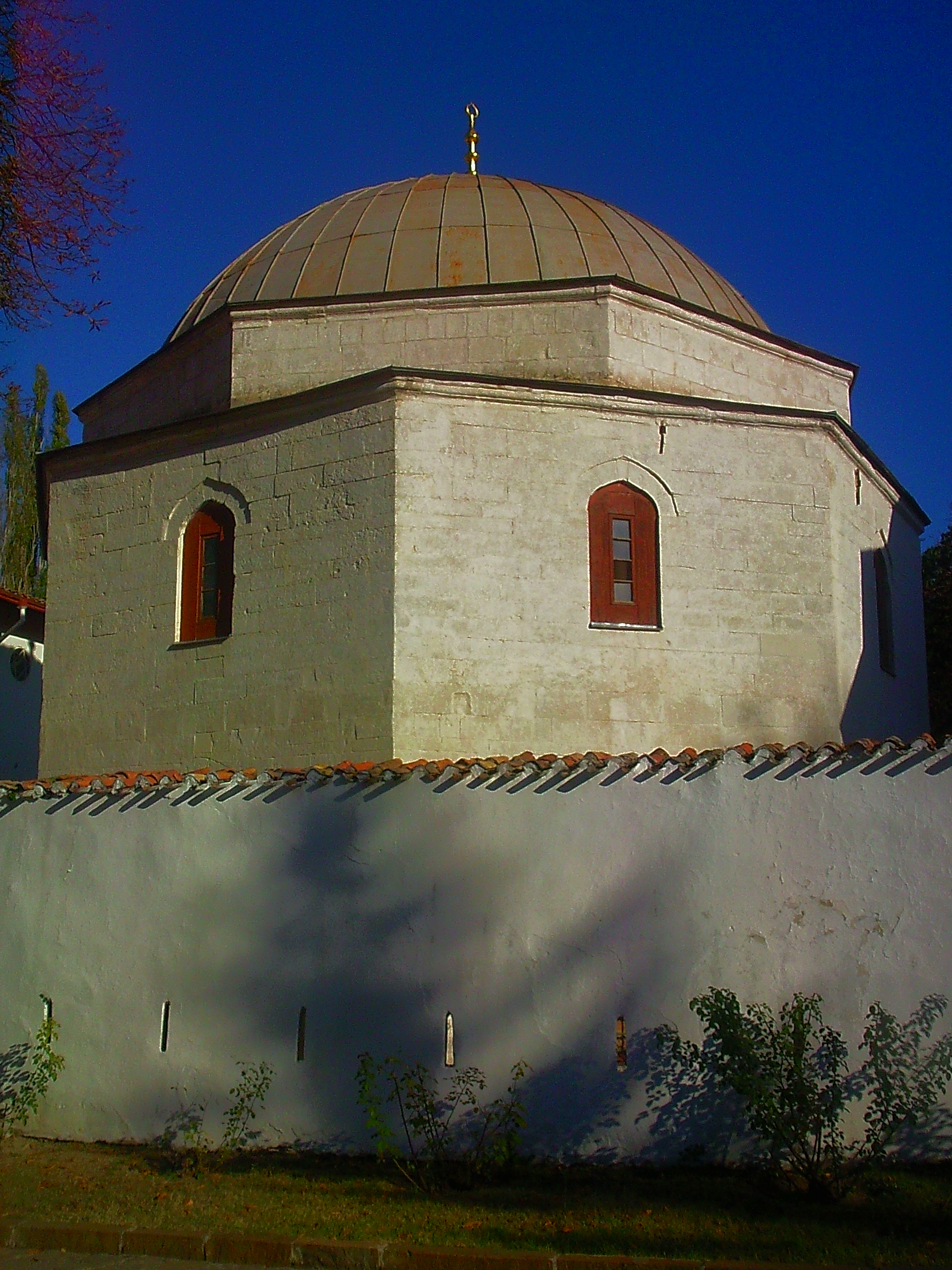
Tomb of Devlet I Giray

In the following years, Devlet's sons and several Crimean and Nogai mirzas conducted smaller raids on Muscovy. As he aged, complex relationships developed between his sons Mehmed and Adil. Devlet died of the plague on 29 June 1577, and was buried in Bakhchisarai. He was succeeded by his eldest son, Mehmed II Geray (1577–1584).

== Family ==
Devlet's wives included:

- Aisha Fatima Khatun, a Circassian princess
- Khansuret Khatun, daughter of Circassian prince Kanbulat, son of Yidar of Kabardia.
- Khanbike Khatun
- Farkhan Khatun
- Jamali Khatun
- Ayşe Sultan, one of only three women known to have played a political role in the Crimean Khanate.

Devlet had many sons, including:

- Mehmed II Giray (1577–1584)
- İslâm II Giray (1584–1588)
- Ğazı II Giray (1588–1607)
- Fetih I Giray (1596–1597)
- Selâmet I Giray (1608–1610)
- Mehmed III Giray (1610, 1623–1627)

Devlet was the ancestor of all subsequent khans. He had 12 or more sons:

- Khaspudan: little information
- Akhmed and Haji: both killed by Russians at Sudbishchi in 1555
- Sherdan possibly killed at the Battle of Molodi in 1572
- Khan Mehmed II Giray 1577–1584. fought in Persia for Turks, deposed by Turks, killed by brother Alp
- Khan Islyam II Giray 1584–1588, imposed by Turks, unsuccessful, natural death
- Khan Gazi II Giray 1588–1607, fought for Turks in west, 2 sons were khans
- Khan Fetih I Giray 1596, briefly imposed by Turks, grandson a Khan
- Khan Selâmet I Giray 1608–1610, fled to Turkey, made khan by Turks, 3 sons were khans
- Shaki Mubarek, fled Gazi II, died in Circassia, son a khan
- Adil: executed by Persians in 1579
- Alp: almost became khan in 1583 and 1588
  - Grandsons:
- Mehmed's son Khan Saadet II Giray (1584) rebelled against Islyam II
- Gazi II's sons Khan Toqtamış Giray 1607–1608 and Khan İnayet Giray 1635–1637)
- Mubarek's son Khan Canibek Giray (1610–1623, 1628–1635)
- Fetih's grandson Khan Adil Giray (1666–1671)
  - All subsequent khans were descended from Selyamet, except for the sons and grandsons of his brothers noted above.

Preceded by Sahib I Giray	Khan of Crimea; 1551–1577	Succeeded by Mehmed II Giray
