= Selâmet I Giray =

Khan of Crimea from 1608 to 1610

Khan of the Tatar Crimean Khanate
- Reign: 1608–1610
- Predecessor: Toqtamış Giray
- Successor: Canibek Giray
- Born: 1558
- Died: 1610 (aged 51–52)
- Dynasty: Giray dynasty
- Religion: Islam

Selâmet I Giray (Note: Crimean Tatar, Ottoman Turkish, and Persian: سلامت کرای) (1558–1610, reigned 1608–1610) was a khan of the Crimean Khanate. His early life was more complex than his 2-year reign. Most of his life involved dynastic conflicts with his brothers and nephews.

== Family ==
All subsequent Crimean khans were descended from Selyamet, except for five who were sons or grandsons of his brothers. Selyamet was the youngest of the many sons of Devlet I Giray (1551–1577). His brothers were khans Mehmed II Giray (1577–1584, killed by Islyam), Islyam II Giray (1584–1588, died naturally), Gazi II Giray (1588–1607, followed by Selyamet) and Fetih I Giray (1596, interrupting Gazi II) and Alp, Shakai Mubarek and five others who died early.

When he came to the throne he was the last surviving brother, so he had to deal with his nephews and their sons. These were, starting with Selyamet's brothers: Mehmed II (sons Murad, Safa, Saadet II Giray [sons Kumyk, Devlet, Mehmed III Giray and Shahin]), Gazi II (son Toqtamış Giray), Shakai Mubarak (sons Canibek Giray and Devlet).

== Early life ==
1577–1584 under Mehmed II Giray: After 1578 Alp Giray quarreled with Mehmed. Alp and the young Selyamet fled to the steppes and were captured by the Cossacks. They were later released and returned to Crimea. In 1584 a Turkish fleet arrived intending to replace Mehmed with Islyam. The brothers Selyamet, Alp, and Mubarak supported Islyam and Mehmed was killed by Alp.

1584–1588 under Islyam II Giray: Little information.

1588–1607 under Gazi II Giray: When Gazi was placed on the throne by the Turks the brothers Alp and Mubarak fled. Selyamet and Fetih joined Gazi. Selyamet became kalga even though he had supported Alp. In June 1588 Safa bin Mehmed returned. Selaymet, who had been involved in Mehmed's death, quarreled with Safa and fled to Kaffa where he was protected by the Turks. Fetih became kalga. By 1601 Selyamet was back in Crimea. In 1601 he was accused of being involved in Devlet bin Murad’s rebellion and fled to Akkerman. Gazi demanded his extradition. The sultan refused, but exiled him to Anatolia. Selyamet joined the Celali rebellions. After their defeat he spent the next seven years imprisoned in the Yedikule Fortress.

== Reign ==
When Gazi died in 1607 the khanship went to his son Tokhtamysh, as was Gazi’s wish. The Turks rejected this, released Selyamet from jail and made him khan (April 1608). Our sources do not explain why the Turks chose a person with such an irregular history. His kalga was Mehmed bin Saadet. By the time Selyamet arrived in Bakhchisarai, Mehmed had killed Tokhtamysh. Mehmed's brother Shahin Giray arrived from Circassia and was made nureddin. Dur-Bike, the widow of Mubarak, who died in Circassia, arrived with her sons Jannibek and Devlet. Selyamet married Dur-Bike and adopted her sons. In 1609 Mehmed and Shahin conspired against Selyamet and were forced to flee from Crimea to Budjak. Jannibek and Devlet became kalga and nureddin. In 1609 and 1610 Jannibek led significant raids against Muscovy and twice crossed the Oka. In late May or early June 1610 the 52-year-old Selyamet died. He was buried in Bakhchisarai.

== His sons ==
All subsequent khans were descended from Selyamet or his brothers. Selyamet was one of the many sons of Devlet I (1550–1577). Of his seven sons, three were khans and four were fathers of khans.

His sons were khans Bahadır I Giray (1637–1641), Mehmed IV Giray (1641–1644, 1654–1666), and İslâm III Giray (1644–1654) and Kyrym, Mubarak, Safa and Adil.

Kyrym's sons were Haci II Giray (1683–84) and Saadet III Giray (1691). Mubarak was the father of Murad Giray. Safa was the father of Safa Giray (1691–92). Adil was the father of Devlet III Giray (1716–17). After these all khans were descended from Selyamet's grandson Devlet II Giray.

== Sources and notes ==
- Oleksa Gaivoronsky «Повелители двух материков», Kiev-Bakhchisarai, second edition, 2010, ISBN 978-966-2260-02-1, volume 1, pp. 306, 308, 310, volume 2, pp. 23–39.

Preceded by Toqtamış Giray	Khan of Crimea; 1608–1610	Succeeded by Canibek Giray
