= Crimean campaign (1584) =

Ottoman–Crimean War (1584)

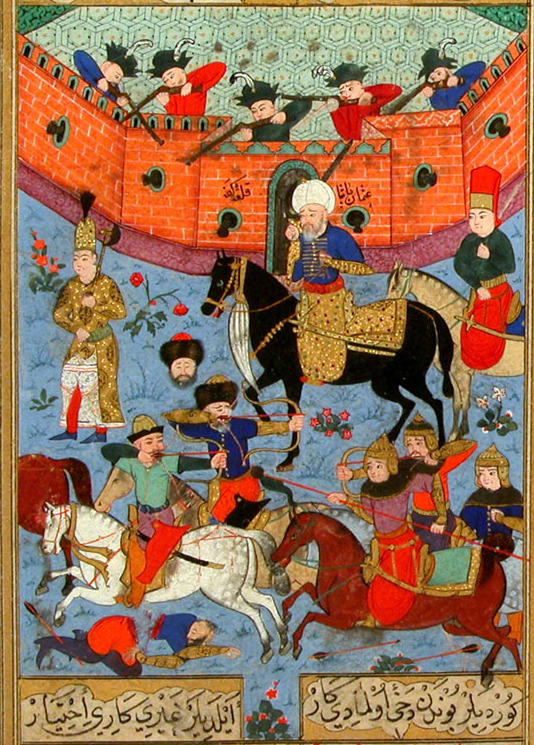
- The defeat of Mehmed Giray II in front of Caffa. Şecaatname
Date	1584
Location	Kaffa, Crimea
Result	Ottoman victory: The Crimean Khanate became even more closely tied to the Ottoman Empire

Belligerents
Ottoman Empire	Crimean Khanate

Commanders and leaders
Özdemiroğlu Osman Pasha; Occhiali; Gazi Ferhad Pasha	Mehmed II Giray (executed); Saadet II Giray

Strength
10,000 soldiers 25 galleys	40,000 horsemen

Casualties and losses
Very light	Heavy

The Crimean Campaign of 1584 was a series of two military operations carried out by the Ottoman Empire in 1584 to punish the rebellious Crimean Khan Mehmed II Giray for refusing to further provide troops to the Ottoman Empire for the campaigns of the Ottoman–Safavid War (1578–1590). The Ottoman Empire attempted to reestablish dominance in the Crimean Khanate, and to enthrone a new Khan favorable to the Ottomans, Islam II Giray.

While Özdemiroğlu Osman Pasha commanded the Ottoman troops in the first operation and Gazi Ferhad Pasha in the second, the Ottoman Navy under the command of Kılıç Ali Pasha landed in Caffa twice.

== Before the expedition ==
Crimean Khan Mehmed II Giray, unlike the first five campaign seasons (1578-1582) of the Ottoman–Safavid War (1578–1590), failed to send the necessary reinforcements to the Ottoman army under the command of Özdemiroğlu Osman Pasha (especially in the Shirvan region) in 1583, where the Ottomans were battling the Safavids. This resulted in his falling out of favor with the Ottoman Palace and his dismissal by Sultan Murad III.

== First expedition ==
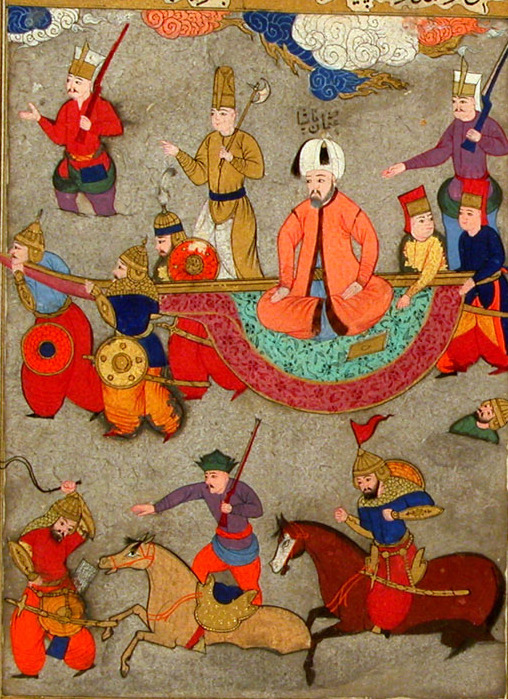
Özdemiroğlu Osman Pasha's passage through the frozen Kerch Strait in the winter of 1583-1584 (Şecaatnâme)

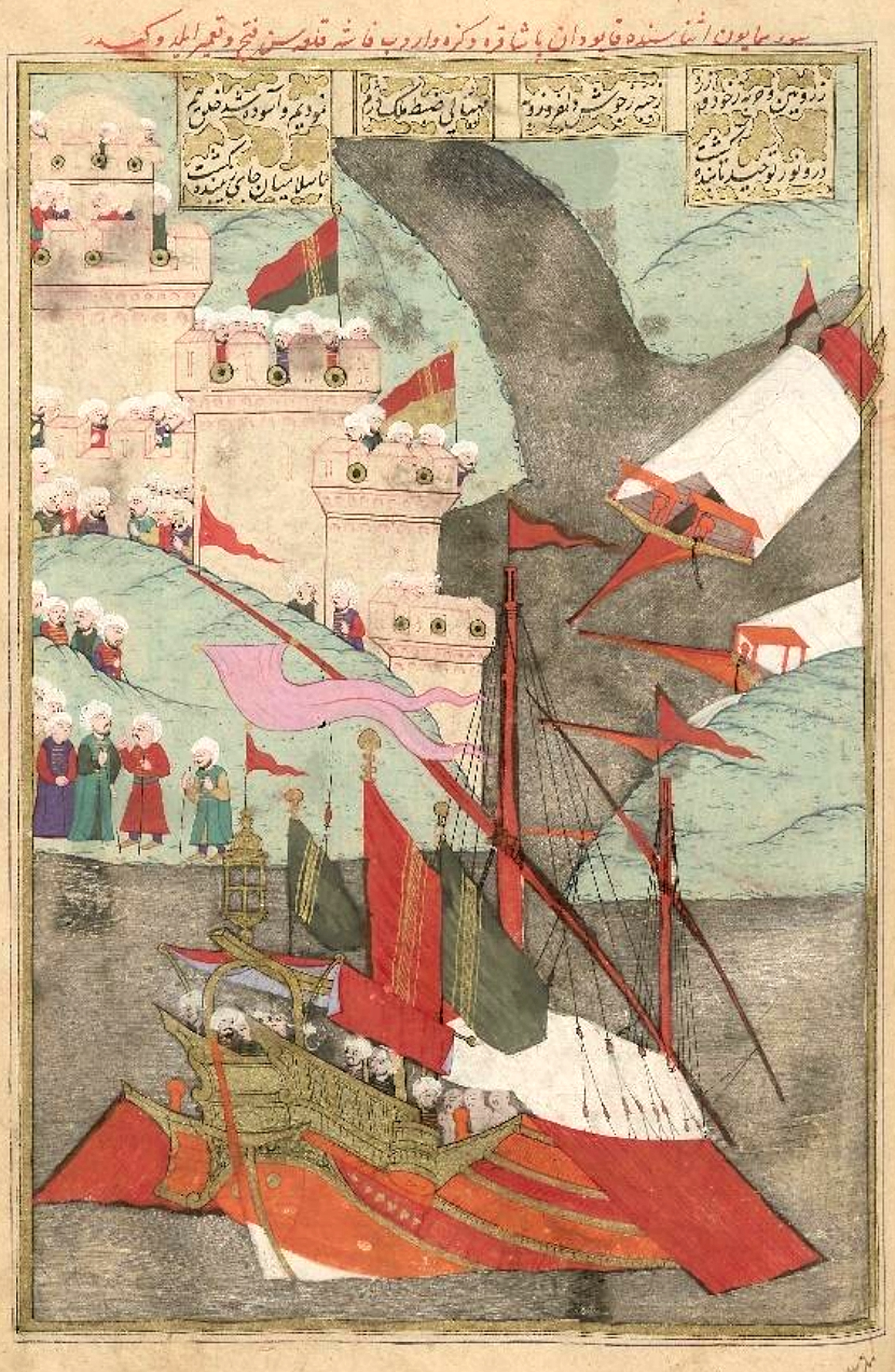
One of the galleys of Ali Pasha in 1578-1579. Şahanşahname (TSKM B.200, 1592)

Özdemiroğlu Osman Pasha, who consolidated the Ottoman rule in Shirvan as a result of the Battle of Torches, left Demirkapı (where he was stationed for five years) with 3,000 soldiers under his command on 21 October 1583 and defeated the Russian troops in the Battle of Sunch River on 28-30 October. He reached Caffa via the north of the Caucasus, following the road from the Kuban River, to Taman and to Kerch.

In response to Sultan Murad III's decree for the execution of Mehmed II Giray, Özdemiroğlu Osman Pasha, despite the potential risks of executing the Crimean Khan during the ongoing Iran War, implemented his order. Özdemiroğlu Osman Pasha took action, granting Alp Giray, Mehmed II Giray's brother, a warrant and appointing him to the khanate.

Mehmed II Giray, however, did not recognize this appointment and marched with his army of approximately 40,000 horsemen to the Caffa Castle (held by the Ottoman Empire), where Özdemiroğlu Osman Pasha was stationed. Five days later his son Safa Giray, who commanded the vanguard, arrived in front of Caffa, set up his tent, and took over the command of the siege. He also forcibly took with him the cannons and artillery that the Ottomans had sent to Crimea to reinforce Özdemiroğlu Osman Pasha while he was fighting in Shirvan, and bombarded Caffa.

Özdemiroğlu Osman Pasha, on the other hand, secretly sent men to the brothers of Mehmed Giray II, trying to win them over or at least keep them away from him. Simultaneously, he requested reinforcements from Istanbul.

Mehmed Giray, however, intensified the siege, destroying the waterways carrying water to Caffa and constructing fortifications for the soldiers to position themselves in. He also burned the vineyards and orchards in the Caffa plain, aiming to cause grain shortages for the Ottoman garrison.

At the Ottoman Palace, a council convened, and it was decided that the Ottoman Navy, along with reinforcements, would be dispatched to Caffa within ten days under the command of Kılıç Ali Pasha. Mehmed II Giray's brother, İslam Giray (who had previously resided in the dervish lodge in Konya, concealing his desire to rule under the garb of a Mevlevi dervish), was appointed Khan of Crimea by the Ottoman court, and brought before Murad III, where he was presented with a sword, a horse, and a red banner with a gold inscription.

On the night of April 24-25, 1584, the Ottoman Navy, under the command of Kılıç Ali Pasha and accompanied by İslam Giray, departed from Istanbul. The fleet, consisting of 25 galleys and a few barges, included approximately 3,000 soldiers, artillerymen, and Kapıkulu soldiers.

The siege of Caffa continued for approximately 40 days, with cannon and rifle fire. The Ottoman Captain of Azov arrived off the coast of Caffa with a dazzling display of skill and cannon fire on the Tatar soldiers loyal to Mehmed II Giray. The Ottoman Navy then appeared off the coast of Caffa. The Tatar soldiers began to disperse under the cannon and rifle fire. Subsequently, as the navy landed troops at Caffa, İslam Giray landed and was met by Özdemiroğlu Osman Pasha. Özdemiroğlu Osman Pasha mounted the new Khan on a horse, marched ahead of him, and, taking his hand, let him ascend the throne. He also declared Alp Giray his lieutenant, a Kalga.

With the proclamation of the new Khan, the soldiers of Mehmed Giray, who was now deposed, began to submit in groups to the command of Islam Giray II. Mehmed Giray, however, fled Crimea one night, hoping to seek refuge with the Nogay Horde located in the region of the Itil River. In the morning, the situation was understood, and Alp Giray was sent in pursuit of Mehmed Giray. Alp Giray, who caught up with Mehmed Giray, executed him with a lasso.

== Second expedition ==
Following the successful conclusion of the expedition, Özdemiroğlu Osman Pasha, accompanied by Kılıç Ali Pasha, departed from Caffa with the Ottoman fleet, entered the Bosphorus on June 29, 1584, and landed at Beşiktaş. Received with great enthusiasm, Özdemiroğlu Osman Pasha appeared before Murad III on July 5. Grand Vizier Kanijeli Siyavuş Pasha, who had seen him as a rival, was dismissed on July 25, and Osman Pasha was appointed Grand Vizier on July 28.

However, the fighting in Crimea continued. Mehmed Giray’s sons, Saadet Giray and Safa Giray, contacted Russia and, three months after their father's murder, sought revenge by securing the support of the Nogays (who were under Russian control) and the Don Cossacks. In early September, they attacked Bakhchisaray, the capital of the Crimean Khanate, with approximately 10,000 cavalry, forcing the wounded Islam Giray II to seek refuge in Caffa. Meanwhile, Janissaries sent via Caffa to reinforce the Demirkapı garrison on the Caucasus front were also in Crimea. The fierce resistance of the Janissaries to the Nogays prevented Islam Giray II from being captured.

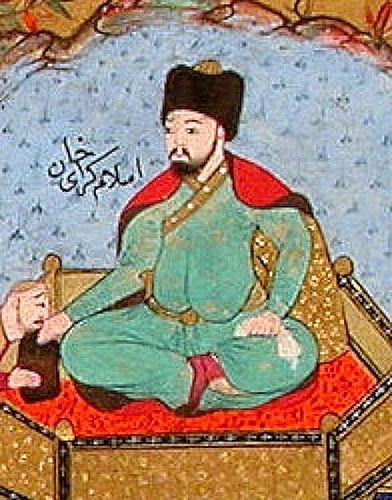
The new khan favored by the Ottomans, İslâm II Giray Khan ("اسلام گيرای خان") enthroned. Secaatname (1586)

In addition to Russia, the Safavid Empire, which had been at war with the Ottomans since 1578, sought to exploit the turmoil in the Crimean Khanate. Shah Mohammad Khodabanda planned to release Gazi Giray, a Crimean prince he had imprisoned in Alamut Castle, and even marry him to one of his daughters.

Following these negative developments, Murad III ordered a second campaign against Crimea and again assigned Özdemiroğlu Osman Pasha, who had been promoted to Grand Vizier. Osman Pasha, in turn, asked Kaptan-ı Derya Kılıç Ali Pasha to prepare for a second campaign to the Black Sea later that year. Kılıç Ali Pasha began preparations for a campaign in October, the first of its kind in the Ottoman Navy's history. According to the plan, 10,000 Janissaries and auxiliary units under Osman Pasha's command were to travel overland from Istanbul to Sinop and be transported by fleet to Caffa. Özdemiroğlu Osman Pasha arrived in Üsküdar on October 15, 1584, where he remained until the troops destined for the campaign were assembled. Setting out in November, the army encountered heavy snowfall when it reached Bolu and Gerede via Üsküdar - İznik, and was ordered to winter in Kastamonu by decree.

Meanwhile, a letter from İslam Giray II requesting assistance against Saadet Giray arrived. Özdemiroğlu Osman Pasha sent a reinforcement unit under the command of the Governor of Bosnia, Gazi Ferhad Pasha, to Caffa, accompanied by a fleet under Kılıç Ali Pasha. With this reinforcement, İslam Giray II gained an advantage over the rebellious Hanzadeh and, together with his brother Alp Giray, defeated the Nogays under Saadet Giray's command in the Andal Desert near Caffa. Alp Giray pursued the rebels as far as the Donets River. Saadet Giray and Safa Giray sought refuge in the Kumyks, while Murad Giray fled to Astrakhan (which was under Russian rule) and then traveled to Moscow to meet with Tsar Feodor Ivanovich, who had just ascended the throne (May 31, 1584). Murad Giray, who planned to march on Crimea again with fresh forces that he would gather with the help of Russia, was forced to abandon this plan completely upon receiving the news that the Ottoman army was on its way to Crimea.

== After the expeditions ==
Thus, the Crimean Khanate was once again firmly subject to the Ottoman Empire. Until the reign of İslam Giray II, the Ottoman sultans had only confirmed the Crimean khans who had ascended to the throne and granted them their royal licence. However, after the intervention of 1584, the sultans directly appointed the Crimean khans, thus tightening Ottoman control over the Crimean Khanate. Furthermore, until the reign of İslam Giray II, only the names of the Crimean khans were read in sermons; from his reign onwards, it became customary to read the names of the Ottoman sultan first, followed by the Crimean khan.

After his victories in Shirvan and Crimea, Özdemiroğlu Osman Pasha was sent by Murad III at the head of the Ottoman army to the Tabriz campaign in the following campaign season. Wintering in Kastamonu between 21 December 1584 and 5 April 1585, the army headed towards the Iranian border in the spring.
