= İnayet Giray =

Khan of Crimea from 1635 to 1637

Inayet Giray (Note: Crimean Tatar, Ottoman Turkish and Persian: عنایت کرای) (1597–1637, reigned 1635–1637) was for two years khan of the Crimean Khanate. He was removed and executed by the Turks because he could not make the Crimeans fight in Persia. His conflict with the Turks was unusually violent.

== Ancestry and early life ==
He was a son of Gazi II Giray (1588–1608). Gazi's sons were, at least, Tokhtamyş, Sefer, Inayet, Husam, Saadet and Aivaz. When Gazi died he appointed his son Toqtamış Giray as khan. The Turks rejected this and appointed Selâmet I Giray (1608–1610). Tokhtamysh and his brother Sefer were killed by Selyamet's men. The remaining brothers, Inayet, Husam, Saadet and Aivaz were sent to Turkey for safety. Members of the Giray family living in Turkey were potential replacements if the Turks chose to remove the ruling khan.

Selyamet was followed by Janibek in 1610, Mehmed III Giray in 1623, and Janibek again in 1628. In 1635 Janibek was removed by the Turks. Inayet was chosen as his replacement with the support of Khan Temir. He promised to lead the Crimean army against Persia.

== Background ==
From 1538 the Turks began demanding Crimean troops to fight in their wars. Crimeans would generally fight in the west but disliked fighting the Persians, apparently because of the long distance and lack of loot. In 1551, 1584 and 1628 (partly) khans were removed by the Turks for refusing to fight in Persia.

This was the time of the Ottoman–Safavid War (1623–1639). Also at this time the steppe warlord Khan Temir was very active and a problem for all his neighbors.

A major event in this period was a shift in the nomadic population. In 1618 the Kalmyks began moving west and reached the Volga around 1630, a process that continued until, perhaps, the fall of 1635. They allied with the Russians in Astrakhan. As a result, the Volga Nogais began moving west toward Crimea. The newcomers were settled on the steppes north of Perekop, greatly increasing the potential number of Crimean troops. Khan Temir tried to gain control of some of them, without much success.

== Reign ==
In March 1635 Inayet and his brothers left for Crimea. After reaching the capital he spent several months getting to know the local nobles and organizing the Persian expedition. He appointed his brothers Husam and Saadat as kalga and nureddin. By fall his army was in Circassia. Since it was near the end of the campaigning season, he marched back to Crimea.

Next spring (1636) ambassador Asan-Aga arrived from Istanbul. In the name of Murad IV, he demanded that the khan immediately lead 60000 Crimeans to Persia, otherwise threatening to execute Inayet and his brothers. Ships to transport them were sent to Balaklava. Inayet called a meeting and the nobles unanimously refused to go to Iran. When Inayet insisted the nobles bluntly told him that if he were removed, they could live with another khan. Several things made the problem worse. Khan Temir was to the north and might attack if troops left Crimea. In addition to the unusually violent threat, the ambassador had not brought the usual gifts and the Kaffa governor had refused Crimea the usual share of taxes. When the Crimeans would not budge the ambassador threatened to make the Crimeans pay a tax as if they were non-Muslim subjects. Given this final insult, Inayet called a kurultai (Note: Gaivoronsky, p203, without explanation. He does not seem to mention any previous kurultais, so this needs a fuller explanation.) in which the khan, nobles and commoners all swore the resist the Turks. If they were defeated they swore to burn their houses and retire to the steppe. The ambassador left for Istanbul.

Inayet now found himself in the same position as Mehmed III Giray in 1624 and 1628. He expected to be attacked by Khan Temir from the north and the Turks from the south. He did the obvious thing and took Kaffa by surprise. He executed the Turkish governor and appointed a Crimean governor for Kaffa and the whole south coast. The sultan was tied down by the Persian war so he sent an ambassador revoking the command to fight Persia and asked Inayet to go fight the Poles. Inayet assumed that they planned to invade when his troops were out of Crimea so he threw the ambassador in jail.

The next problem was Khan Temir. Khan Temir rejected an offer of alliance. At some point Inayet had sent a letter to the Polish king suggesting friendship. In the summer of 1636 he sent another letter announcing his break with Turkey and offering a kind of subjection in return for a joint war against the Turks. Wladislaw IV had better sense, although, as usual, he would not necessarily restrain the Zaporozhians. Inayet offered to pay the Cossacks for help. They offered 5000 men but sent only 600 under ataman Pavel Bout.

In January 1637 Inayet set out for Budjak. It is said that he had 150,000 Crimeans and Nogais, as opposed the Khan Temir's 12000. Khan Temir had asked for Turkish support and received none. He told his men to make the best deal they could and fled south to Kiliya, where he stored his treasures, and then on to Istanbul. At Akkerman Inayet met the Budjaks under Urak, Salman Shah and the sons or brothers of Khan Temir. The khan forgave them and told them to move east toward Crimea. He sent a letter to the Sultan threatening invasion if Khan Temir was not surrendered. Husam Giray captured Kiliya and returned with Khan Temir's treasure. Murad IV first tried diplomacy. He said that he was not displeased with the removal of the Budjaks, would not dethrone Inayet and suggested that Inayet prove his prudence by going back to Crimea. In May he learned that the Turks were assembling a fleet, so he withdrew to Crimea.

Inayet led the captured Budjaks eastward. He crossed the Dnieper and left his brothers Husam and Saadet in charge of the Budjaks. The brothers spent a few days feasting with the Budjak leaders at the Jan Kerman fortress. On the night before the Budjaks were to cross the river the brothers set up their tent on the edge of the camp. At dawn they were awakened by shouts and gunshots and found themselves surrounded. Salman Shah tried to restrain his men, but both brothers were cut down. The Crimeans from Jan Kerman could only bury the dead.

On 13 June 1637 a Turkish fleet arrived at Kaffa. Along with janissaries was Inayet's replacement, Bahadır I Giray. Inayet decided to give up. (Note: Gaivoronsky does not explain his decision. Although he had lost control of the Budjaks, they were disorganized and probably not a threat unless Khan Temir was released. If he still had 150,000 men he could have prevented an invasion, although he probably could not have captured the walled port of Kaffa. The gunpowder he had ordered from Poland had not arrived. Polish contemporaries thought that the loss of Husam and Saadet Giray was important (Gaivoronsky, footnote 49). Gaivoronsky does not say whether the Crimeans nobles would support him, something that must have been central. The Turkish re-capture of Kaffa is easily explained if the port was unfortified on the seaward side, which seems likely. Inayet probably hoped he would be exiled, even though the Turkish ambassador had threatened to execute him.) The next day he sailed for Istanbul to explain himself to the sultan.

On 1 July 1637 both Inayet and Khan Temir appeared before the sultan. Since he had captured Kaffa and Kiliya, killed a Turkish governor and threatened to attack Istanbul, he had no case. He was taken away and strangled. Inayet was given a proper funeral and buried at Aziz Eyub-Ansai in Istanbul. Khan Temir was sent away to be a governor of a province in Anatolia, but, nine days after Inayet, he was also strangled.

== Source and notes ==
- Oleksa Gaivoronsky «Повелители двух материков», Kiev-Bakhchisarai, second edition, 2009, ISBN 978-966-2260-02-1, volume 2, pp. 197–219
- footnotes
- Special notes

| Preceded by Canibek Giray | Khan of Crimea; 1635–1637 | Succeeded by Bahadır I Giray |
