= Adil Giray =

Khan of Crimea from 1666 to 1671

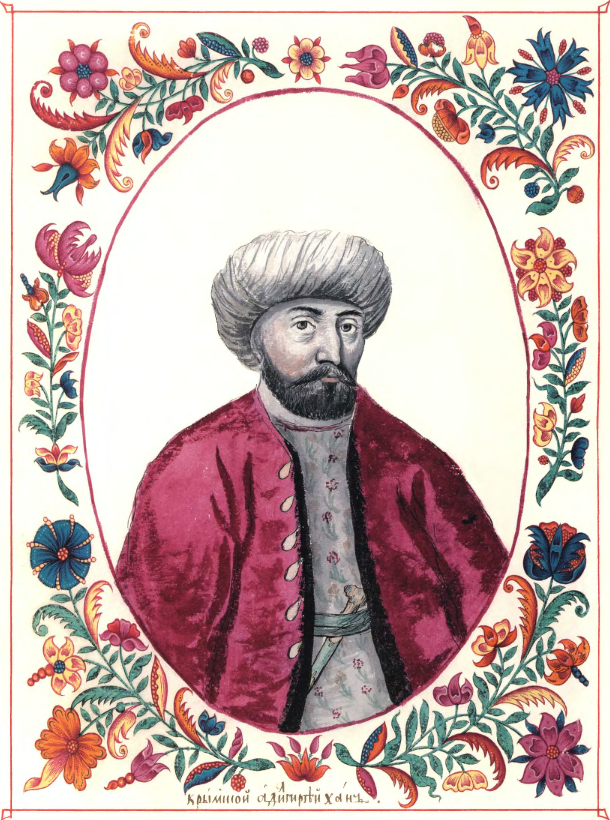

Khan of the Tatar Crimean Khanate
- Reign: 1666–1671
- Predecessor: Mehmed IV Giray
- Successor: Selim I Giray
- Born: 1617
- Died: 1672 (aged 54–55); Ottoman Bulgaria
Names
- عادل كراى
- Dynasty: Giray dynasty
- Religion: Islam

Adil Giray (Note: Crimean Tatar, Ottoman Turkish, and Persian: عادل کرای.) was khan of the Crimean Khanate from 1666 to 1671.

== Family ==
He is said to have been the grandson of Fetih I Giray (see below). His father was killed in battle in 1624 when the Turks tried to overthrow Mehmed III Giray. None of his descendants were khans. His elder brother Fetih was nureddin in 1641-44 during the first reign of Mehmed IV Giray. His kalga and nureddin were Devlet and Gazi, sons of his brother Fetih.

Another Adil Giray was one of the many sons of Selâmet I Giray. He served as nureddin under his brothers İslâm III Giray and Mehmed IV Giray circa 1651 to before 1666. His son was Devlet III Giray (1716-1717). He was killed by a fall from a horse.

== Reign ==
In 1666 he was placed on the throne by the Ottomans, who were displeased with khan Mehmed IV. At the time he was in exile at Rhodes. He came into conflict with his nobles, especially the Shirin clan, because of his questionable ancestry and high taxes. It is said he strongly supported the Polish–Lithuanian Commonwealth, and was one of the candidates in the Polish royal election of 1669. For the complex events to the north, see The Ruin (Ukrainian history) and Petro Doroshenko.

In 1671 he was removed as khan by Ottoman sultan Mehmed IV, either when the sultan decided go to war with the Commonwealth or because he had ravaged some villages loyal to the pro-Turkish Doroshenko. He was exiled to Karnobat in modern Bulgaria and died the following year.

== His grandfather and father ==
The story goes that some time between 1588 and 1597 (Note: Fetih I Giray became kalga in 1588 and was khan in 1596 and 1597.) a noble Polish girl was captured during a Tatar raid and presented to Fetih Giray. Fetih wanted to marry her but she refused to betray her faith so she was held for ransom. A court servant named Haji Mustafa was sent to take the girl to Poland and bring back the ransom. En route the girl gave birth to a son. Fetih indignantly denied responsibility and sent men to kill all three of them for the crime of fornication and insulting his good name. The girl died in childbirth and Haji Mustafa fled with the infant, whom he named Mustafa. After Fetih's death in 1597 they settled in Crimea near Ak-Mesjid (Simferopol). Mustafa grew up as a simple shepherd and had two sons. In 1623 he was summoned to the capital by Mehmed III Giray. Mehmed recognized him as Fetih's son, appointed him nureddin and made him take the name of Devlet Giray. His sons were to be called Fetih and Adil Giray in place of their lower class names of Kul-Bolda and Chul-Bolda. Because of this his family was called Choban or shepherd. The following year the Turks invaded Crimea and were defeated. While pursuing the defeated Turks Adil's father Mustafa-Devlet Giray-Choban was killed.

Howorth (1880) differs from Gaivoronsky's account (above) as follows. The girl was called Maria Potoska. He has 'Haji Ahmed' for Haji Mustafa and 'Ahmed Giray' for Devlet Geray. He seems to think (p558) that Adil was another son of 'Choban Giray'. He says that Mustafa was adopted because Mehmed was childless. Purgstall (1856) says that the girl was 'probably Maria Potocka'.

== Notes ==
Preceded by Mehmed IV Giray	Khan of Crimea; 1666–1671	Succeeded by Selim I Giray
