= Fetih I Giray =

Khan of the Tatar Crimean Khanate
- Reign: 1596–1597
- Predecessor: Ğazı II Giray
- Successor: Ğazı II Giray
- Born: c. 1557
- Died: 1597
- Dynasty: Giray dynasty
- Religion: Islam

Fetih I Giray (Note: Crimean Tatar, Ottoman Turkish and Persian: فطح کرای.) (c. 1557–1597, reigned 1596–97) was briefly khan of the Crimean Khanate, interrupting the reign of his elder brother Ğazı II Giray (1588–1607). He was one of the many sons of Devlet I Giray. Khan Adil Giray (1666–1671) was said to be his grandson.

== Life ==
When Gazi II became khan in 1588 Fetih was appointed Kalga. In 1592 he led a very successful raid south of the Oka River.

=== War in Hungary ===
During the Long Turkish War, Gazi fought in the Balkans in the Turkish service (1594–95). What Fetih did at this time does not seem to be recorded. In 1596 Gazi and Fetih set off for another campaign in Hungary. Gazi split his forces and remained in Wallachia to deal with some rebels and sent Fetih with 20000 men to Hungary where he met Sultan Murad III for the first time. Fetih went with Murad to the Siege of Eger (1596) in northeast Hungary. According to Gaivoronsky (Note: Gaivoronsky (2010, p. 359); however, Türk (2000, p. 45) has the Tatars attack the rear of the Austrian fortification, allowing Chigalazade to attack from the front. Battle of Keresztes gives a very different account.), after the place was taken, in October 1596 a large Habsburg army appeared and almost reached the Sultan's tent when Fetih and Cığalazade Yusuf Sinan Pasha attacked them in the rear. The Austrians faced around and this allowed the Turks to defeat them. As a reward Chigalazade was made grand vizier and Fetih was appointed khan of Crimea in place of Gazi. This was toward the end of 1596.

=== Reign and death ===
Several reasons have been given for Gazi's deposition. Gazi's friend and protector, Sultan Murad III died in January 1595. Gazi had suggested putting his relatives on the thrones of Moldavia or Wallachia, which seemed like a dangerous extension of Crimean power. Gazi's failure to report to Murad in 1596 looked like disobedience. Chigalazade seems to have had a personal hostility to Gazi, going back to 1585 when both were fighting the Persians.

Fetih at first protested, or pretended to. Gazi was back in Crimea when he heard of his disposition. According to Gaivoronsky he began intriguing with all the neighboring powers - Poles, Austrians, Moldavians, Wallachians and Zaporozhians. According to Türk he sent a letter of protest to the Sultan After 45 days as grand vizier, Chigalazade was replaced by Damat Ibrahim Pasha who recommended that Gazi be restored. This was a problem for the Sultan since any conflict in Crimea would deprive him of troops he needed in Hungary. He solved the problem by sending Handan Agha to Crimea with two letters of appointment – one for Fetih and one for Gazi. He was told to decide which man had the most support and give him the letter. The problem was that Handan was a friend of Gazi's. He chose Gazi and burned Fetih's letter. The next problem was that Fetih had another letter of appointment. The letters were presented to the Kadi at Kaffa and he chose Fetih's on the ground that it had the sultan's signature. Gazi appealed to the Mufti. The Mufti preferred Gazi's letter because it had the sultans ‘tuğra’ – a piece of calligraphy that amounted to a seal. The Mufti outranked the Kadi, so Fetih had lost. (Note: From here to Fetih's death following Gaivoronsky (2010). However, Türk (2000) omits this section and says that Fetih planned to go to Istanbul, but chose to visit his brother first.) The Sultan invited him to Istanbul. On learning, or guessing, that the Sultan planned to execute him, he fled to his Circassian father-in-law. (His Circassian wife was the former wife of his brother Mubarak.) There was some talk of him going over to the Russians, as his nephew Murad Giray had done. This was some time in the first half in 1597.

In the summer of 1597 Gazi led his troops to the steppes north of Crimea. (Note: Gaivoronsky (2010) does not explain why. Perhaps he was planning to deal with the Zaporozhians.) Fetih assumed that he was starting another Hungarian campaign, so he invaded Crimea. Gazi returned and drove him out. Fetih decided to submit. In Gazi's tent outside of Kaffa, while kneeling before Gazi to make submission, one of the Mansur (Note: Gaivoronsky (2010, p. 363) has Mansur; Türk (2000, p. 55) has Mangit.) Mirzas stepped forward with a battle ax and bashed his head in. Baht Giray fled on horseback, but was caught and killed. (Note: Baht Giray was Fetih's kalga and the son of the Adil Geray who was executed by the Persians in 1579.) Following this Fetih's whole family was killed, including his nine children. (Note: How khan Adil Giray could have been his grandson is not explained.) Some have claimed that Gazi did not give the order, but this seems unlikely.

== Notes ==
Preceded by Ğazı II Giray	Khan of Crimea; 1596–1597	Succeeded by Ğazı II Giray
