= Toqtamış Giray =

Khan of Crimea from 1607 to 1608

Khan of the Tatar Crimean Khanate
- Reign: 1607–1608
- Predecessor: Ğazı II Giray
- Successor: Selâmet I Giray
- Born: 1589
- Died: 1608 (aged 18–19)
- Dynasty: Giray dynasty
- Religion: Islam

Toqtamış Giray (Note: Crimean Tatar, Ottoman Turkish and Persian: توقتامیش کرای) (1589–1608, reigned 1607–1608) ruled briefly as khan of the Crimean Khanate. He followed his father Gazi II Giray, was rejected by the Ottomans and killed by his successor Selâmet I Giray.

In 1602, when Gazi left on his third Hungarian campaign, he appointed his 13-year-old son Tokhtamysh as kalga (qalgha, designated successor) and left him in nominal charge of Crimea. After he returned to Crimea in 1603 he sent Tokhtamysh with some troops back to Hungary.

Gazi died in 1607. By custom, when a khan died power passed to his eldest surviving brother and then to his son. The clan leaders declared the new khan and then requested confirmation from the Ottoman sultan, who sometimes made another choice. Gazi's only living brother was the 50-year-old Selyamet, who was imprisoned in Anatolia. Gazi had made Tokhtamysh his kalga or designated successor. Further, Sultan Murad III (1574–1595) had promised that the khanship would go to Gazi's son, in accordance with Ottoman custom. The elders chose the 19-year-old Tokhtamysh and sent to Istanbul for confirmation. Sultan Ahmed I hesitated. His father Mehmed III (1595–1605) had found Gazi a good warrior, but hard to control, and thought that Gazi's son might also prove disobedient. Ahmed's advisors suggested Selyamet as an alternative. In April 1608 Selyamet was taken from prison and declared khan. Mehmed, son of Saadet II Giray would be his kalga.

When Tokhtamysh heard of his disposition he set out overland to talk to the sultan. While crossing the Southern Bug he met Mehmed and a group of janissaries who were travelling overland to Crimea. Tokhtamysh's outnumbered retinue fled and Tokhtamysh died fighting, along with his brother, kalga Sefer Giray. Meanwhile, Selyamet arrived by ship in Crimea, was recognized by the beys and proceeded to Bakhchisarai. Mehmed soon arrived with news of Tokhtamysh's death.

== Sources ==
- Oleksa Gaivoronsky «Повелители двух материков», Kiev-Bakhchisarai, second edition, 2010, ISBN 978-966-2260-02-1, volume 1, pp. 368, 373, volume 2, pp. 23–27.

Preceded by Ğazı II Giray	Khan of Crimea; 1607–1608	Succeeded by Selâmet I Giray
