= Alp Giray =

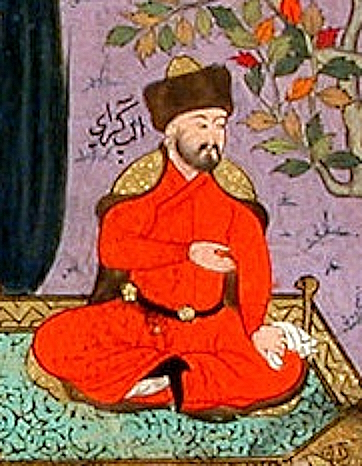
Alp Giray (اَلْپ كِراى), a younger brother of Mehmed II Giray, conferring with Osman Pasha, circa 1584-85. Şecâ‘atnâme (1598)

Alp Giray (اَلْپ كِراى) was a son of Devlet I Giray and a younger brother of Crimean Khan Mehmed II Giray. He became Kalga, the second highest rank after that of Khan in 1580, following the death of his brother Adil Giray.

The death of Adil Giray was a consequence of the Ottoman–Safavid War (1578–90), in which the Crimeans fought against the Safavids, on the Ottoman side. On 30 November 1579, the Tatar army clashed with the main Safavid force on the Menla Hasan river. The battle lasted three days and ended with a Tatar defeat, Adil Giray was captured. Due to Adil's death in captivity, Mehmed II Giray had first appointed his son Saadet II Giray as kalga. Mehmed's younger brother Alp Giray instigated a revolt, in an effort to take the throne for himself, and obtained the title of Kalga instead.

Meanwhile Sa'adet Giray, the Khan's son who was initially slated for the position of Kalga, received the newly created dignity of nureddin, second after the qalga.

In 1583, the Khan Mehmed II Giray had an open quarrel with Osman Pasha, the Ottoman commander on the Persian front. Osman Pasha was ordered by the Ottoman court to remove the Khan, while Alp Giray contacted the Ottoman court and offered to replace his brother. In 1584, Mehmed II Giray and Osman Pasha entered into a military conflict, leading to the Crimean campaign (1584). Mehmed II Giray besieged Osman Pasha in Caffa, but was repulsed by Ottoman guns. While escaping, the khan was killed by his brother Alp Giray. Surprisingly, the Porte did not designate Alp Giray as the new Khan, but rather İslâm II Giray, another brother, who had spent many year as hostage at the Ottoman court.

== Sources ==
- Kolodziejczyk, Dariusz (22 June 2011). The Crimean Khanate and Poland-Lithuania: International Diplomacy on the European Periphery (15th-18th Century), A Study of Peace Treaties Followed by an Annotated Edition of Relevant Documents. BRILL. p. 104. ISBN 978-90-04-21571-9.
- Türk, Ahmet (2000). "The Crimean Khanate Under the Reign of Ğazı II Giray". Bilkent University Thesis. Bilkent University: 1–134. hdl:11693/16983.
