= İslâm II Giray =

Khan of Crimea from 1584 to 1588

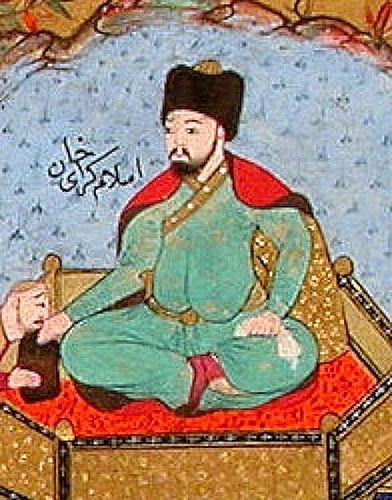
- İslâm II Giray Khan ("اسلام گيرای خان") enthroned. Secaatname (1586)

Khan of the Tatar Crimean Khanate
- Reign: 1584–1588
- Predecessor: Saadet II Giray
- Successor: Ğazı II Giray
- Died: 1588
- Dynasty: Giray dynasty
- Religion: Islam

İslâm II Giray (Note: Crimean Tatar, Ottoman Turkish and Persian: اسلام کرای ثانی) was Khan of the Crimean Khanate from 1584 to 1588.

His long stay in Turkey, theological training, and possibly age, may have unfitted him to rule. Most of the fighting was done by his brother Alp Giray. He was one of the many sons of Devlet I Giray. His reign was briefly interrupted by the usurpation of his nephew Saadet, and much of his reign was spent in conflict with Saadet and his brothers, the sons of his murdered brother and predecessor, Mehmed II Giray. Unlike many Crimean khans he died of natural causes.

== Early life ==
The year of his birth is not given. After his father Devlet I Giray came to the throne in 1551, Islyam was sent to the Sultan's court as a rekhin or kind of honorary hostage. Girays living in Istanbul could be put on the Crimean throne if the ruling khan was disobedient. He spent more than 30 years of his life in Turkey and at some point left the Ottoman court for the Mevlevi Order of Sufis at Konya, where he engaged in prayer, meditation and theological study.

== Accession ==
In 1584 his elder brother Khan Mehmed II Giray refused a Turkish order to lead the Crimeans on a distant campaign to Persia. Murad III recalled Islyam and declared him the new Crimean Khan. The Sultan's reasons were probably that Islyam was the eldest Giray after Mehmed and that his long stay in Turkey and lack of military experience would make him a tractable vassal. In May 1584 Islyam arrived at Kaffa with Turkish soldiers and was joined by his brothers Alp, Selyamet and Mubarek and most of the Crimean nobles including the Shirin clan. Mehmed, his sons (below) and the pro-Nogai Mansur clan leaders fled toward the steppe seeking Nogai support. Near Perekop Alp caught up with Mehmed and had him strangled. Islyam with Turkish troops marched to Bakhchisarai and took the throne. Alp became his kalga and Mubarak his nureddin.

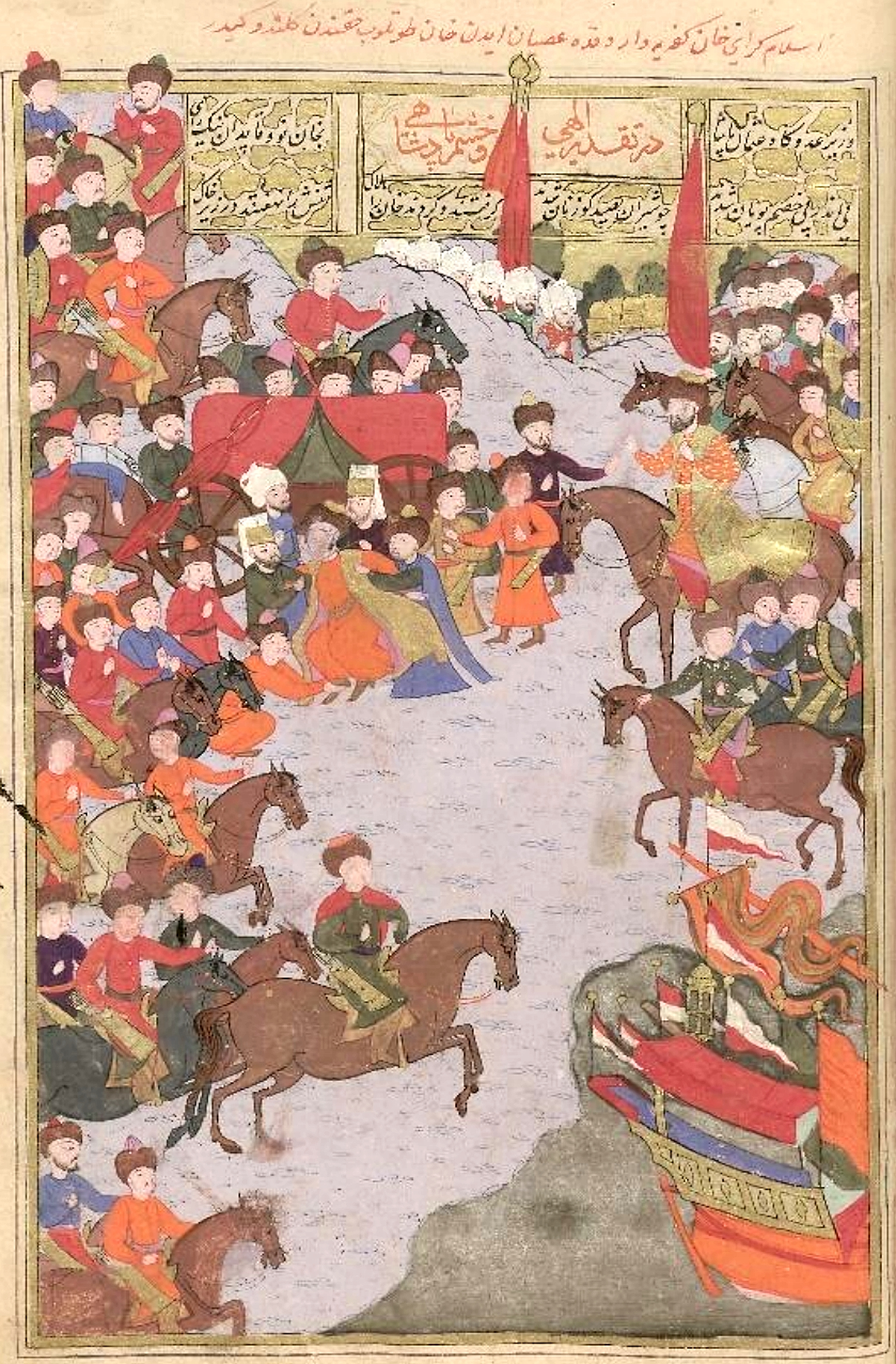
Mehmet Giray II captured by Crimean Tatars supporting İslam Giray Khan (148a). Şehinşahname, TSMK B.200 (1588)

== Saadet’s rebellion ==
When Mehmed died his sons were Saadet II Giray, Murad and Safa. Three months after Islyam's accession, seeking revenge for their murdered father, Saadet and his brothers led 15000 Nogais, 230 Don Cossacks and the Mansur bey southward. There was no defending army because most of the beys and mirzas had gathered at Bakhchiserai to make arrangements for the new reign. They defended the capital for seven days and then broke up. Under cover of darkness Islyam fled southwest through the hill country to Balaklava and took ship to the Turkish garrison at Kaffa. He was joined by his brothers Alp and Selyamet who had traveled by land. Saadet seized the royal treasury and headed east toward Kaffa. Because of his victory and possession of the treasury many beys joined him. At the old capital of Stary Krym the beys proclaimed him khan. At some point he was joined by some Kumyks. The Zaporozhian Cossacks offered to fight for pay, but this plan was overtaken by events.

Saadet marched south and besieged Kaffa. Saadet could not break the walls and the garrison could not deal with the Nogai cavalry. Islyam appealed to the Turks. After a two and a half month siege 4000 janissaries arrived in galleys. Alp opened the gate and the Turkish artillery drove back the Nogai horse. There was a bloody battle at the river Indol near Stary Krym. Saadet was defeated and fled.

In the summer of the following year (1585) Saadet tried again but was defeated by Alp Giray before he reached Perekop.

== On the steppe ==
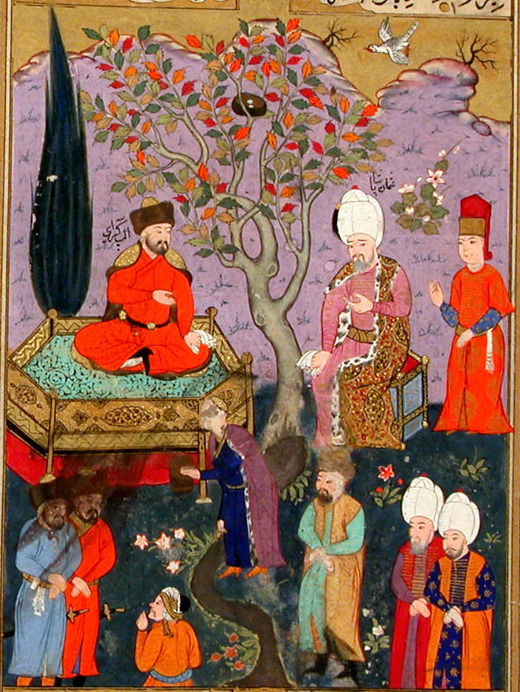
Alp Giray (left, "آلپ گيرای"), brother of İslâm II Giray, confering with Osman Pasha (right) in 1584-85. Secaatname (1598)

The three brothers were now in danger since any bold chieftain might seize them and sell them to Islyam. Saadet and his younger brother Safa fled east to refuge with Chopan, the shamkhal of the Kumyks on the Caspian Sea. Chopan probably wanted a bargaining chip to protect his independence, since in the last reign Turkish and Crimean troops had several times marched through his lands to attack the Persians. The Shah of Persia was happy with Saadet's arrival and sent him a decorated saber which he suggested be used against the Turks. See Ottoman–Safavid War (1578–90).

Another source has Safa go first to Cherkassia, then to the Kumyks in autumn 1586, and later refuse to cooperate with the Russians.

Murad chose a stronger protector and went to the Russians at Astrakhan. The Russians hoped to use him as a puppet khan just as they had done at Kazan. Murad went to Moscow in the spring of 1586, was shown great honor and returned to Astrakhan in September. He affected royal airs and called himself 'Lord of the Four Rivers" (Don, Volga, Ural and Terek), but was closely watched by the Russians. He was told to unite the Nogais, Kabardians and Kumyks against Crimea and Turkey. Urus Bey of the Nogais submitted very reluctantly and sent a complaint to the sultan. In the spring of 1587 Islyam heard that the czar had sent Murad 30000 streltsi and Cossacks in preparation for an attack on Crimea at the end of the year. In response, Alp and Selyamet made a raid on the Oka (1587). The Russians claimed success, but the raid reduced their support for Murad. The Russians pretended that they had sent the men to fight the Poles, not the Crimeans.

Unhappy with Murad's demands, Urus-Bey sent an ambassador to the sultan offering to become a Turkish subject and receive a Turkish governor, asking for Adil Giray's fort of Bola-Serai to replace Saraichik which the Volga Cossacks had destroyed and proposed a new Turkish campaign to liberate Astrakhan. Some time before the Sultan had received a proposal from Bukhara for a joint attack on Astrakhan to open up communications north of the Caspian. Both were at war with Persia. The vizier Piyale-Pasha visited both Bukhara and the Nogais and reported that the capture of Astrakhan was feasible. The sultan ordered Urus and Islyam to prepare for a Volga campaign in the spring of 1588. Islyam would be in charge. Piyale-Pasha began filling Kaffa with food and equipment. (When Islyam died in 1588 the campaign was cancelled, the Turkish troops were sent to the Persian front and the galleys returned to the Mediterranean.)

At this time Murad had gone to the Kumyks to marry the Shamkhal’s daughter and bring him into the Russian orbit, while Saadet moved from Kumykia to Astrakhan. It was learned in Crimea that a certain Khoja-bey had left Istanbul, bypassed Crimea and landed at Azov with messages for Saadet and Murad. We do not know what was said, but a few weeks later Saadet was found dead at Astrakhan. It is thought that the Russians had him murdered, fearing that he might go over to the Turks. The whole business remains mysterious.

== In Crimea ==
After Saadet's expulsion the Janissaries were rather rough with his supporters which made Islyam unpopular. There was a problem with Alp since he had long been in Crimea, had military experience and would probably have made a better khan. Islyam had difficulty imposing himself since his subjects might to go over to the three brothers if he did anything unpopular.

Less than a month after Alp's 1587 campaign, Islyam and his younger brother Fetikh went to Gozleve/Evpatoria on some business. The Turks there complained that they could not reach Crimea by land because the Cossacks were raiding and had destroyed fort of Ak-Chakum (apparently Ochakiv at the mouth of the Dnieper estuary). While he was there the Cossacks looted seventeen villages on the northwest coast of Crimea and disappeared before Islyam could do anything. The sultan sent a blunt letter hinting that he knew what to do with a khan who could not defend their northern frontier. He also ordered Islyam to make a retaliatory campaign against the Poland which, in theory, controlled Zaporozhian Cossacks.

That winter Islyam started his only military campaign, along with his brothers Alp and Fetikh. He was to join the Turkish army at Akkerman and do something that is not explained. The campaign failed from the start. He had to coerce a number of subjects who did not want to join him. Because of an unusually warm winter they had to spend a month on the Dnieper waiting for it to freeze. When he got to Akkerman he found that the Turks, who had been waiting for him since autumn, had dispersed because of his delay. He was therefore forced to wait at Akkerman until they came back. In March 1588, at that city, he died of natural causes. He was buried in the walls to the Akkerman mosque.

The beys who were with Islyam chose Alp Giray as the new khan. They sent to Istanbul for confirmation, but the sultan chose Gazi II Giray (1588–1608).

== See also ==
- Crimea#geography for places

== References and notes ==
- Oleksa Gaivoronsky «Повелители двух материков», Kiev-Bakhchisarai, second edition, 2010, ISBN 978-966-2260-02-1, volume 1, pages 319–331
- Henry Hoyle Howorth, History of the Mongols, 1880, Part 2, pp. 518–523 (out of date)

Preceded by Mehmed II Giray	Khan of Crimea; 1584–1584	Succeeded by Saadet II Giray
Preceded by Saadet II Giray	Khan of Crimea; 1584–1588	Succeeded by Gazi II Giray
