= Mehmed II Giray =

Khan of Crimea from 1577 to 1584

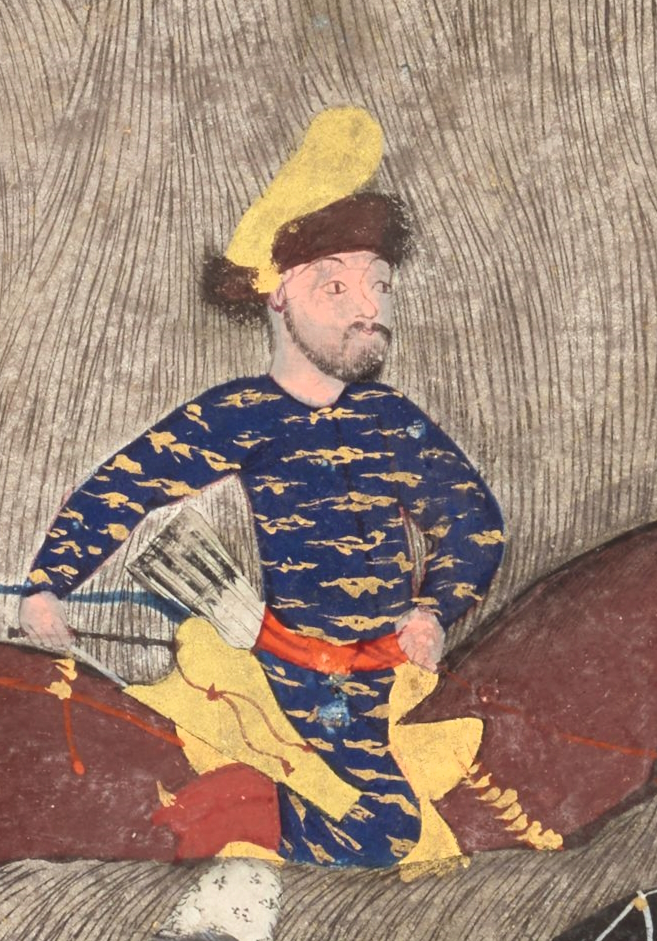
- Mehmet Giray (detail) crossing a river in Hungary in 1566 with the Ottomans. History of Sultan Süleyman by Seyyid Lokman, 1579.

Khan of the Tatar Crimean Khanate
- Reign: 1577–1584
- Predecessor: Devlet I Giray
- Successor: Saadet II Giray (nominally); İslâm II Giray
- Born: 1532
- Died: May 1584 (aged 51–52)
- Dynasty: Giray dynasty
- Religion: Islam

Mehmed II Giray (Note: Crimean Tatar, Ottoman Turkish and Persian: محمد کرای ثانی) (1532 – May 1584) was Khan of the Crimean Khanate who reigned from 1577 to 1584. During his reign he made at least three campaigns against Persia in the service of the Ottomans. He was overthrown by the Ottoman Empire in the Crimean campaign (1584), for refusing to participate to another Ottoman campaign. He was one of the numerous sons of Devlet I Giray. Five of his brothers were later Khans.

He was called Semiz or 'the fat'. Because of his weight he avoided riding horseback and preferred to travel in a wagon drawn by six or eight horses. His use of a wagon contributed to his death. When he came to the throne he had no living uncles and six living brothers: Adil, Alp, Gazi, Fetkh, Mubarak and Selyamet. Saadet II Giray was his son. His many brothers, each of whom was a potential khan, caused trouble during his reign and after.

== Early life ==
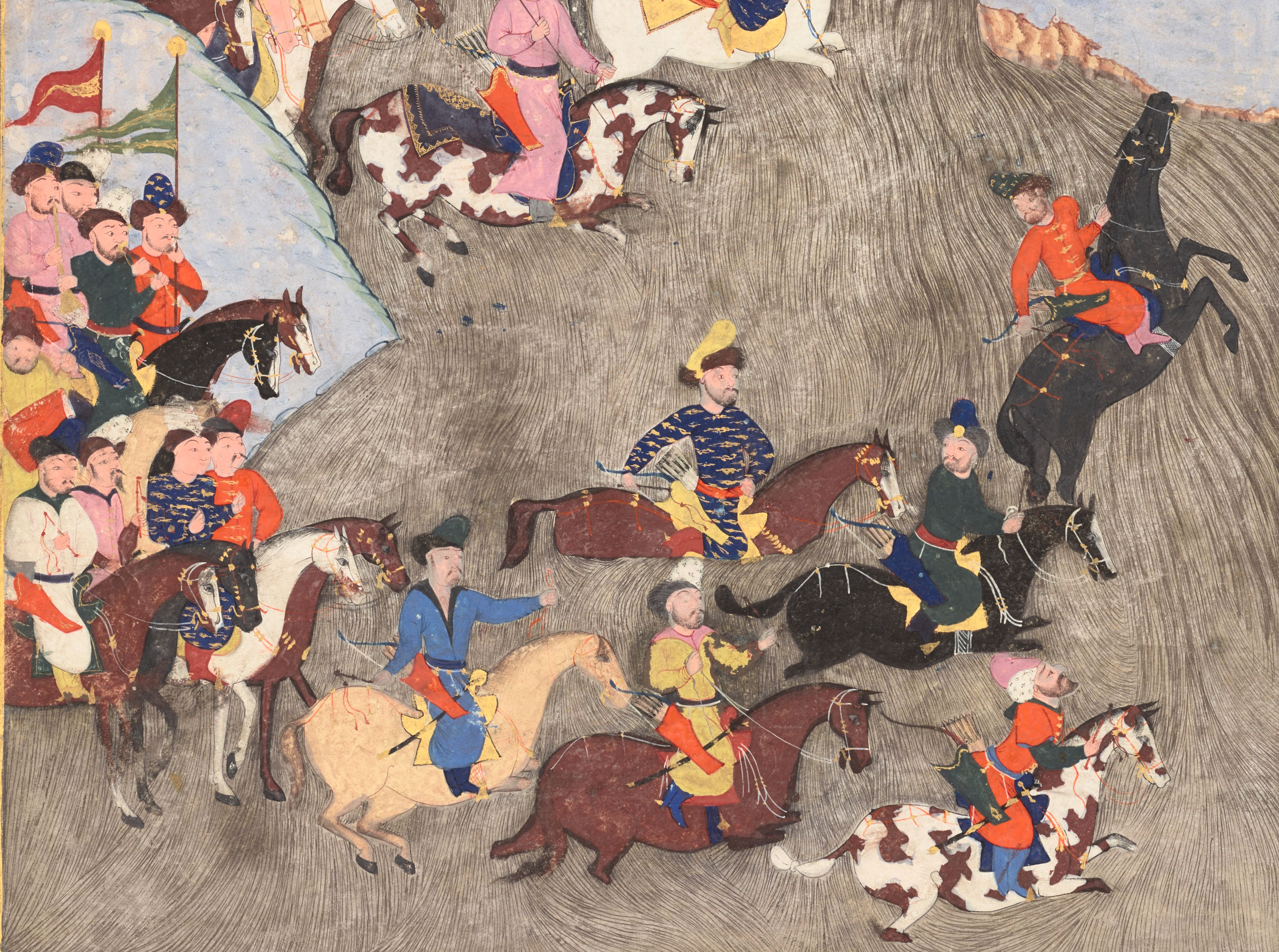
Troops of the Crimean khanate under Mehmet Giray crossing a river in Hungary in 1566. History of Sultan Süleyman (1579).

He was the son of khan Devlet I Giray (1551–1577). After the death of his elder brother Akhmed in 1555 he held the rank of Kalga or deputy khan and designated successor until his father's death. For his early campaigns against Russia see under Devlet. In 1555 he rescued his father at Subishchi. In the 1560s it is said that he fought in Hungary in the Turkish service: the History of Sultan Süleyman shows him in 1566 under the Ottomans, during the events around the Siege of Szigetvár.

Toward the end of his father's life relations between Mehmed and his younger brother Adil grew strained. Adil moved to the steppe, built the town of Bola-Serai on the Kalmius River and gathered Nogai supporters. Just before his death Devlet was able to reconcile his surviving elder sons.

== Reign ==
Devlet died on 29 June 1577 and was followed by his 45-year-old son. Since he was the eldest son and Kalga and since Devlet had no living brothers, Mehmed's accession was not a problem. Adil became Mehmed's Kalga.

In 1577 he raided Vohynia In Polish territory until the Polish king paid a ransom. The Crimeans and Nogais returned with 35,000 captives, 40,000 horses and 500,000 cattle and sheep in addition to the ransom. (?)

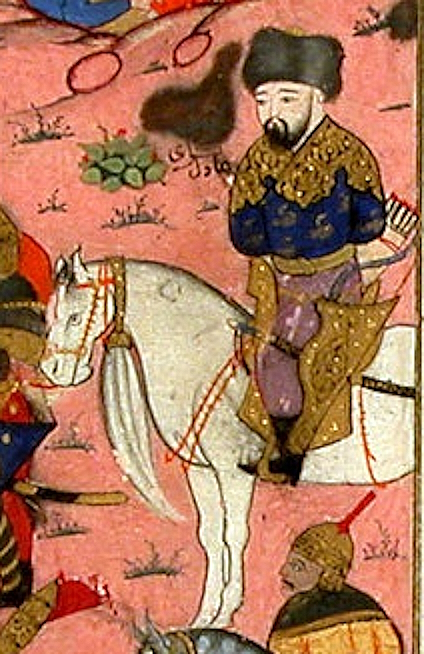
Crimean Khanate commander Adil Khan Giray, younger brother of Mehmed II Giray, captured by the Safavids in Shirvan in November 1587. Şeca'atname (1598)

1578 First Persia: In the summer of 1578 sultan Murad III ordered the Crimeans to fight the Persians near the southwest corner of the Caspian Sea. (See Ottoman–Safavid War (1578–90)) In 1551 his predecessor, Sahib I Giray, was overthrown by the Turks for refusing a similar order. Mehmed claimed illness and declined. Instead he sent 20000 men under his brothers Adil, Mubarak and Gazi. Mehmed may have intended to get Adil out of the way. He also sent his son Saadet and then called him back. After a 3-month march along the north side of the Caucasus and down the Caspian coast in November they reached Shirvan (approximately modern Azjerbaijan) and joined Özdemiroğlu Osman Pasha. They completely defeated 25000 Persians under Shirvan Beylerbey Aras Khan Rumlu who were besieging Shamakhi. They moved south to the Mugan plain where they defeated the Rumlu tribe of Qazilbash nomads. An Iranian army arrived and on 28 November they were completely defeated at the Battle of Mollahasanli. All their booty was captured as was Adil Geray. (The battle was fought in heavy rain which made their horses slip and weakened their bows. Adil was unhorsed by a spear and saved his life by identifying himself as a valuable captive.) Adil was executed in July 1579 during the next campaign, partly as a result of a palace intrigue involving the Shah's wife. Thus their first campaign was a complete failure.

1579 Second Persia: In the summer of 1579 Mehmed led 100000 men against Persia. They met Osman Pasha at Derbent, Gazi Giray defeated the Iranians at Baku and the Tatars occupied all of Shirvan. They spread out taking loot and captives. Iranian troops were defeated and their commander, Mukhammed-Khalif, was killed. Mehmed claimed that he was avenging his murdered brother Adil. In fall they returned to Crimea taking a huge amount of loot and thousands of captives to sell into slavery. Gazi Giray remained with a small detachment. The Sultan was not happy with their withdrawal. After they left Shirvan was reoccupied by the Kazilbashi.

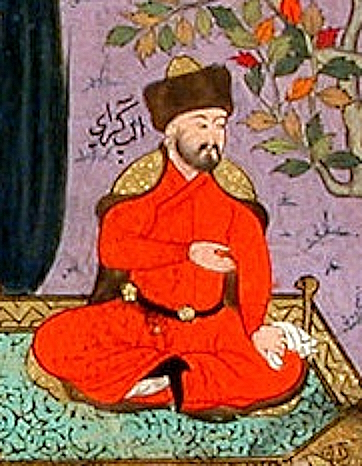
Alp Giray, another brother of Mehmed II Giray, conferring with Osman Pasha, circa 1584-85. Şecâ‘atnâme (1598)

Conflict with Alp Giray: After the death of Adil Giray Mehmed appointed his son Saadet as Kalga. Mehmed's brother Alp Giray thought that he should be Kalga. He was supported by several major beys and at least one of Mehmed's sons. Mehmed ordered Alp to lead an army against Persia, Alp refused and Mehmed planned to kill him. Alp and Selyamet fled to the steppe and were captured by the Cossacks. Mehmed sent ambassadors offering 70,000 gold coins for their return. The ambassadors had orders to kill them once they were away from the Cossacks. Ali-Bey of the Shirins supported Alp and Mehmed was forced to bring Alp back and make him Kalga. Saadet was given the new rank of Nureddin or second successor after the Kalga. The Kalga Alp held the eastern part of the peninsula dominated by the Shirin clan while the Nureddin Saadet held the western steppe-like part dominated by the Mansur clan and linked to the Nogais. This balancing of power was a potential source of conflict.

1580 Third Persia: (?) In 1580 a Crimean army under Gazi and Safa Geray again invaded Shirvan and defeated a Kazilbash army under Salman Khan, beylerbey of Shirvan. They helped Osman Pasha move from Derbent to capture Baku. They fought the main kazilbash army at Mallakhasan and withdrew to Dagestan. When a large Iranian army approached Osman Pasha pulled back to Derbent.

1581 Fourth Persia: In the spring of 1581 the Crimeans under Gazi and Safa Geray again invaded Shirvan. Between the towns of Shemakhi and Şabran they were defeated by an Iranian army under Peyker Khan, the beylerbey of Shirvan. Gazi Geray was captured.

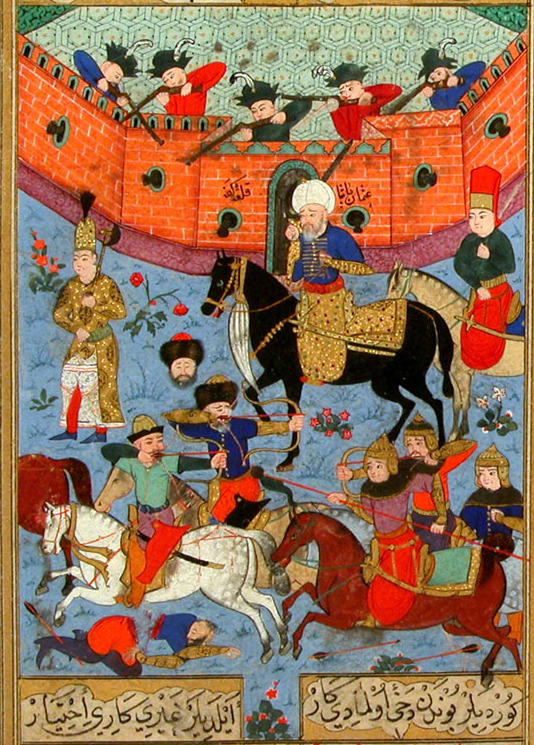
The unsuccessful siege of Kafa by Mehmed II Giray in 1584 and the final victory of Osman Pasha. Secaatname (1598)

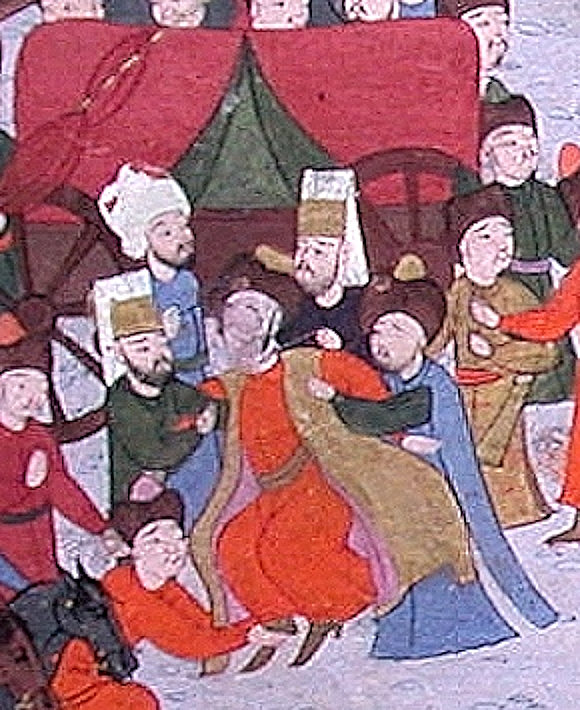
The arrest of Mehmet Giray II next to his wagon, captured by Crimean Tatars supporting İslam Giray Khan, and Ottoman Janissaries (148a). Şehinşâhnâme II, TSMK B.200 (1588)

1582–1584 Overthrow: In the summer of 1582 Turkish troops arrived at Kaffa with orders for the Crimeans to join them on another campaign against Persia. Mehmed called a council of his nobles and it was decided to refuse the command. The Turks marched to Persia without them. It is not clear why Mehmed risked this dangerous insult to his overlord. At the end of 1583 Osman Pasha arrived at Kaffa after an autumn march from Shirvan. He had secret orders to arrest Mehmed and take him to Istanbul.

Mehmed invited him to talks at Stary Krym, and when Osman refused Mehmed's suspicions were confirmed. He collected 40,000 troops and besieged Kaffa. Neither side dared to attack the other. Alp Giray secretly left the khan's camp, went to Osman and had Osman propose him as the new khan, something that he had no legal power to do. Most of the beys remained loyal but the Mufti of Kaffa supported the Turks. In May 1584 a Turkish fleet arrived at Kaffa, starting the Crimean campaign (1584). On board was Mehmed's brother Islyam Giray with a document from the sultan declaring him the new khan. Most of the nobles went over to Islyam. Mehmed, his sons Saadet, Murad and Safa and the Mansur Beg fled toward the steppe. Alp, Selyamet and Mubarak went after him. Near Perekop Alp caught up with Mehmed's wagon and strangled him. He was buried at Bakhchiserai. This was the year that Ivan the Terrible died.

Islyam II Giray (1584–1588) became khan. Islyam was supported by his brothers and opposed by Mehmed's sons.

== His sons ==
When Mehmed died his sons – Saadet, Safa and Murad – fled to the steppe. They were accompanied by some of the Mansur clan who lived in the northwestern, steppe-like part of Crimea.

Saadet: Three months later, Saadet and his brothers led 15000 Nogais south, seeking to avenge their father. They took the capital and Saadet declared himself khan as Saadet II Giray. Islyam fled to the Turks at Kaffa where he was besieged. After three months 4000 Turks arrived with artillery and drove Saadet back to the steppe. In the spring of 1585 Saadet tried again but was defeated before he reached Crimea. For more see İslâm II Giray.

The three brothers were now in danger since any bold chieftain might seize them and sell them to Islyam. Saadet fled east to Chopan, the Shamkhal of the Kumyks on the Caspian Sea. Chopan probably wanted a bargaining chip to protect his independence, since in the last reign Turkish and Crimean troops had several times marched through his lands to attack the Persians. The Shah of Persia was happy with Saadet's arrival and sent him a decorated saber which he suggested be used against the Turks. See Ottoman–Safavid War (1578–90).

The Russians invited him from Kumykia to Astrakhan, perhaps to join his brother Murad. It was learned in Crimea that a certain Khoja-bey had left Istanbul, bypassed Crimea and landed at Azov with messages for Saadet and Murad. We do not know what was said, but in the autumn of 1587 Saadet was found dead at Astrakhan. It is thought that the Russians had him murdered, fearing that he might go over to the Turks. The whole business remains mysterious.

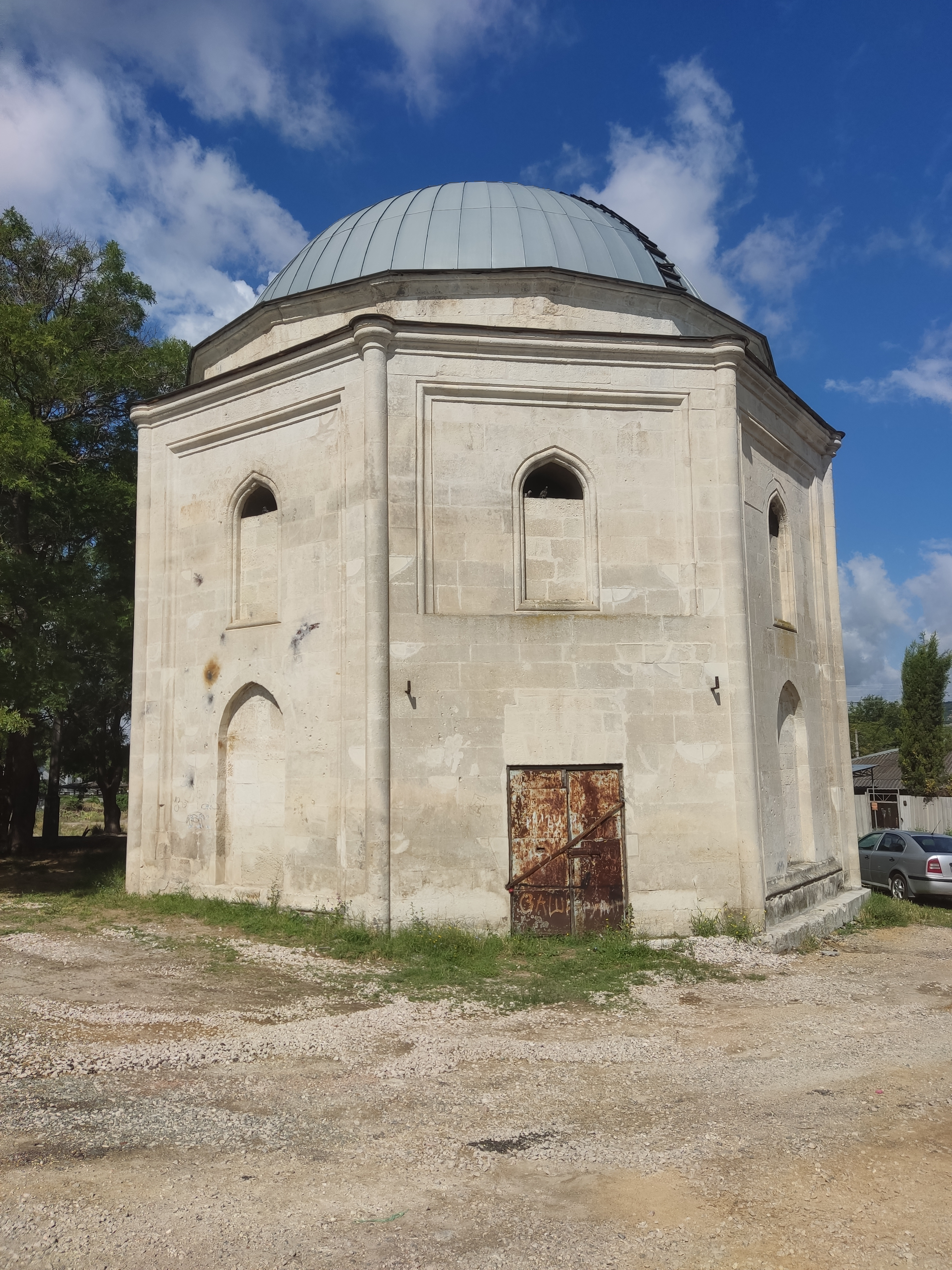
The tomb of Mehmed II Giray in Crimea

Safa: During Saadet's revolt Safa was his kalga. After Saadet's second defeat, Safa went to Circassia. In the autumn of 1586 he joined Saadet in Kumykia. In October 1586 the Russians invited Safa and Saadet to join their brother Murad at Astrakhan. Saadet went, but Safa refused. In 1587 he was in Circassia or with the Little Nogai Horde to the north. In the spring of 1588 Khan Islyam died and was replaced by Gazi II. In May 1588 Safa returned to Crimea and became Gazi's Nureddin. In June he met the Russian ambassador concerning Murad. In 1591 he participated in Gazi's attack on Russia. Returning from the campaign he fell ill and died in Crimea.

Murad chose a stronger protector and went to the Russians at Astrakhan. The Russians hoped to use him as a puppet khan just as they had done at Kazan. Murad went to Moscow in the spring of 1586, was shown great honor and returned to Astrakhan in September. He affected royal airs and called himself "Lord of the Four Rivers" (Don, Volga, Ural and Terek), but was closely watched by the Russians. He was told to unite the Nogais, Kabardians and Kumyks against Crimea and Turkey. Urus Bey of the Nogais submitted very reluctantly and sent a complaint to the sultan. In the spring of 1587 Islyam heard that the czar had sent Murad 30000 streltsi and Cossacks in preparation for an attack on Crimea at the end of the year. In response, Alp and Selyamet made a raid on the Oka. The Russians claimed success, but the raid reduced their support for Murad. The Russians pretended that they had sent the men to fight the Poles, not the Crimeans.

Unhappy with Murad's demands, Urus-Bey sent an ambassador to the sultan offering to become a Turkish subject and receive a Turkish governor, asking for Adil Giray's fort of Bola-Serai to replace Saraichik which the Volga Cossacks had destroyed and proposed a new Turkish campaign to liberate Astrakhan. Some time before the Sultan had received a proposal from Bukhara for a joint attack on Astrakhan to open up communications north of the Caspian. Both were at war with Persia. The vizier Piyale-Pasha visited both Bukhara and the Nogais and reported that the capture of Astrakhan was feasible. The sultan ordered Urus and Islyam to prepare for a Volga campaign in the spring of 1588. Islyam would be in charge. Piyale-Pasha began filling Kaffa with food and equipment. (When Islyam died in 1588 the campaign was cancelled, the Turkish troops were sent to the Persian front and the galleys returned to the Mediterranean.)

In the winter if 1586/87 Murad went to the Kumyks to marry the Shamkhal's daughter and bring him into the Russian orbit, while Saadet moved from Kumykia to Astrakhan. In early 1587 he returned to Astrakhan without a wife. That autumn Saadet died and Murad married his widow. In 1588 Khan Islyam died and was replaced by Gazi II. In late 1588 Gazi sent ambassadors to Moscow asking that Murad be released. The Russians said that he was free to go. He went to Moscow in February 1589 and again in the summer of 1590. In 1591 Murad decided to return to Crimea without the Czar's permission. The Russians made no attempt to stop him, but on the eve of his departure he was found dead along with Kumyk, son of his brother Saadet. The Russians blamed his death on Tatar “sorcerers" and had them burnt at the stake. His wife, Es-Tourgan, whose previous husband Saadet had died under similar circumstances, wrote to Crimea saying that her husband and stepson had been poisoned. Later, as part of a peace deal on the eve of the Hungarian war, Es-Tourgan was allowed to go to Crimea along with Saadet's sons Devlet, Mehmed and Sahin.

== See also ==
- Crimean-Nogai Raids, years 1555–1584
- Crimea § Geography

== Sources ==
- Oleksa Gaivoronsky «Повелители двух материков», Kiev-Bakhchisarai, second edition, 2010, ISBN 978-966-2260-02-1, volume 1, pages 299–317
- For his sons Gaivoronsky pp. 319–329, 340–347
- Henry Hoyle Howorth, History of the Mongols, 1880, Part 2, pp. 512–518

Preceded by Devlet I Giray	Khan of Crimea; 1577–1584	Succeeded by Islyam II Giray
