= Ğazı II Giray =

Khan of Crimea from 1588 to 1596 and 1597 to 1607

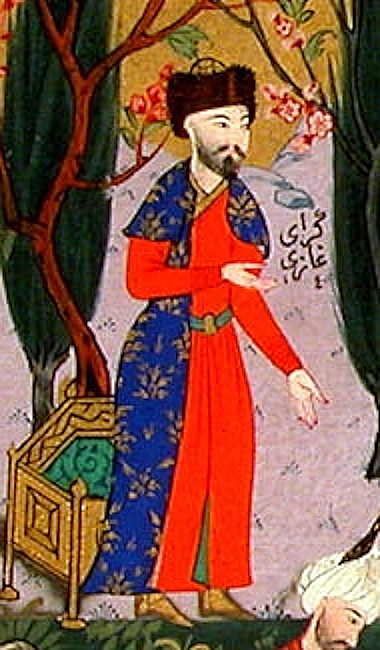
- Contemporary portrait of Gazy II Giray ("غازی گيرای"), standing in captivity with Safavid Hamza Mirza. Secaatname (1598)

Khan of the Tatar Crimean Khanate (1st reign)
- Reign: 1588–1596
- Predecessor: İslâm II Giray
- Successor: Fetih I Giray

Khan of the Tatar Crimean Khanate (2nd reign)
- Reign: 1597–1607
- Predecessor: Fetih I Giray
- Successor: Toqtamış Giray
- Born: c. 1551/1554
- Died: November 1607 (53-56); Temryuk
- Dynasty: Giray dynasty
- Religion: Islam

Ğazı II Giray (Note: Crimean Tatar, Ottoman Turkish and Persian: غازی کرای ثانی Ghazî Giray Sânî) (1551/54 – November 1607) was Khan of the Crimean Khanate from 1588 to 1596 and again from 1597 until his death in 1607. Born in 1554, he distinguished himself in the Ottoman–Safavid War of 1578–1590, gaining the trust of his Ottoman suzerains. He was appointed khan in 1588, after his homeland experienced a period of political turmoil. He failed to capture Moscow during his 1591 campaign against Russia; however, he managed to secure a favorable peace treaty two years later. He was then summoned to support his Ottoman allies in the Long Turkish War, taking part in multiple military expeditions centered in Hungary. In late 1596, the Ottoman sultan briefly unseated Ğazı II Giray in favor of Fetih I Giray after heeding the advice of Grand Vizier Cığalazade Yusuf Sinan Pasha. He returned to power three months later, continuing his reign until his death in November 1607.

== Early life ==
Ğazı Giray was born in 1554. Little is known about his youth, it is speculated that while being hanzade (son of the khan) he was sent to the Circassian tribe of Besleni to receive training in horsemanship and the military arts. His name is first mentioned in a document detailing a 1575 Tatar raid on Podolia. The raid was sparked by the revolt of Moldavian voivode John III the Terrible who refused to accept the raise in tribute he had to pay to the Ottoman Empire. The Ottomans requested the Crimean Khanate to aid them in the conflict after realizing that Zaporozhian Cossacks had intervened on John's side. The conflict ended when the Ottomans executed the Cossack commander Ivan Pidkova and unseated John.

In November 1578, Crimean khan Mehmed II Giray entered the Ottoman–Safavid War (1578–90) on the Ottoman side. Ğazı Giray was among the soldiers taking part in the expedition. The Crimean army under the khan's brother Adil Giray relieved the besieged Shemakha garrison at a critical point, defeating the Safavids. The first rift between the allies appeared when the Ottomans prohibited the Tatars from conducting booty raids and insisted on organizing them into a regular unit of their army. Looting had been the primary objective of all Tatar military campaigns and a major source of wealth for the common soldier as they did not receive salaries. The dispute was settled after the Tatars managed to pillage a convoy carrying the treasury of Aras Khan. On 30 November, the Tatar army clashed with the main Safavid force on the Menla Hasan river. The battle lasted three days and ended with a Tatar defeat, Adil Giray was captured yet Ğazı Giray managed to escape. Due to Adil's death in captivity, Mehmed II Giray appointed his son Saadet II Giray as kalgay. A year later, Mehmed II Giray arrived at the front with reinforcements, departing in the summer after a successful raid on Gence netted him enough booty. In the meantime, Mehmed's younger brother Alp Giray instigated a revolt, in an effort to take the throne for himself. The Ottomans questioned the loyalty of the khan after he declared that he was an independent ruler rather than an Ottoman vassal, ordering İslâm II Giray to ascend.

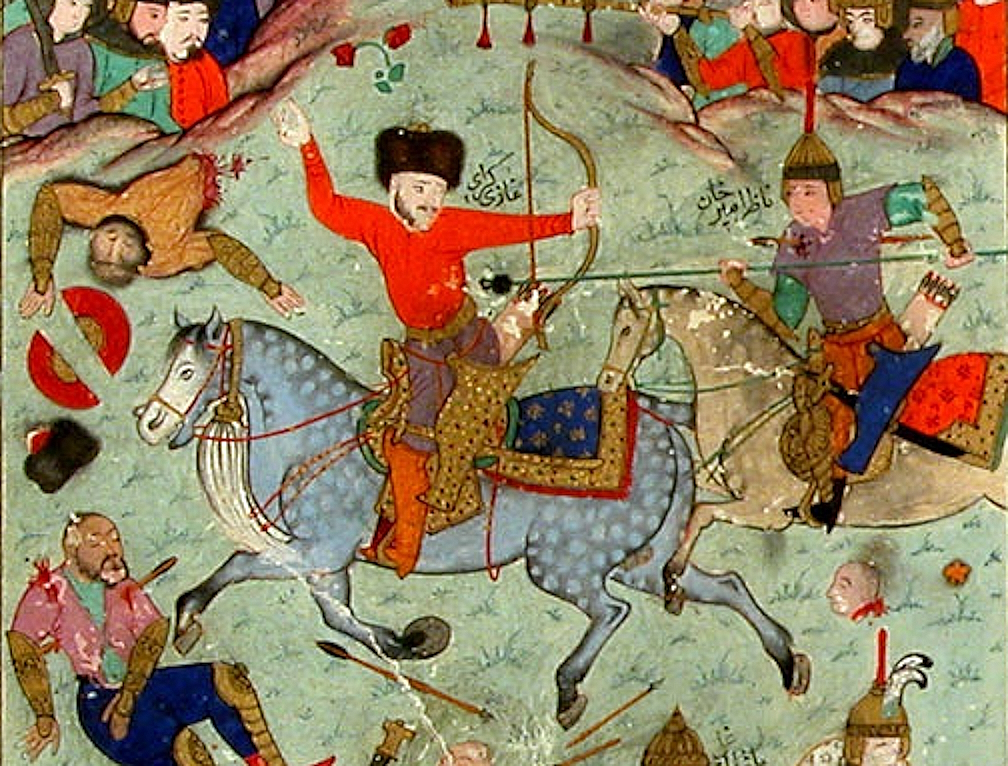
Ğazı Giray being defeated in 1581

Ğazı Giray remained in the Caucasus at the head of a small force. In the winter of 1579, Ğazı Giray distinguished himself during a surprise attack on a Safavid encampment in Gence. The Ottoman sultan rewarded him for this action with 50,000 akçes. In the spring of 1581, Ğazı Giray suffered a defeat in the vicinity of Shemakha and was taken prisoner. After refusing numerous proposals of collaboration he was imprisoned in the Alamut Castle.

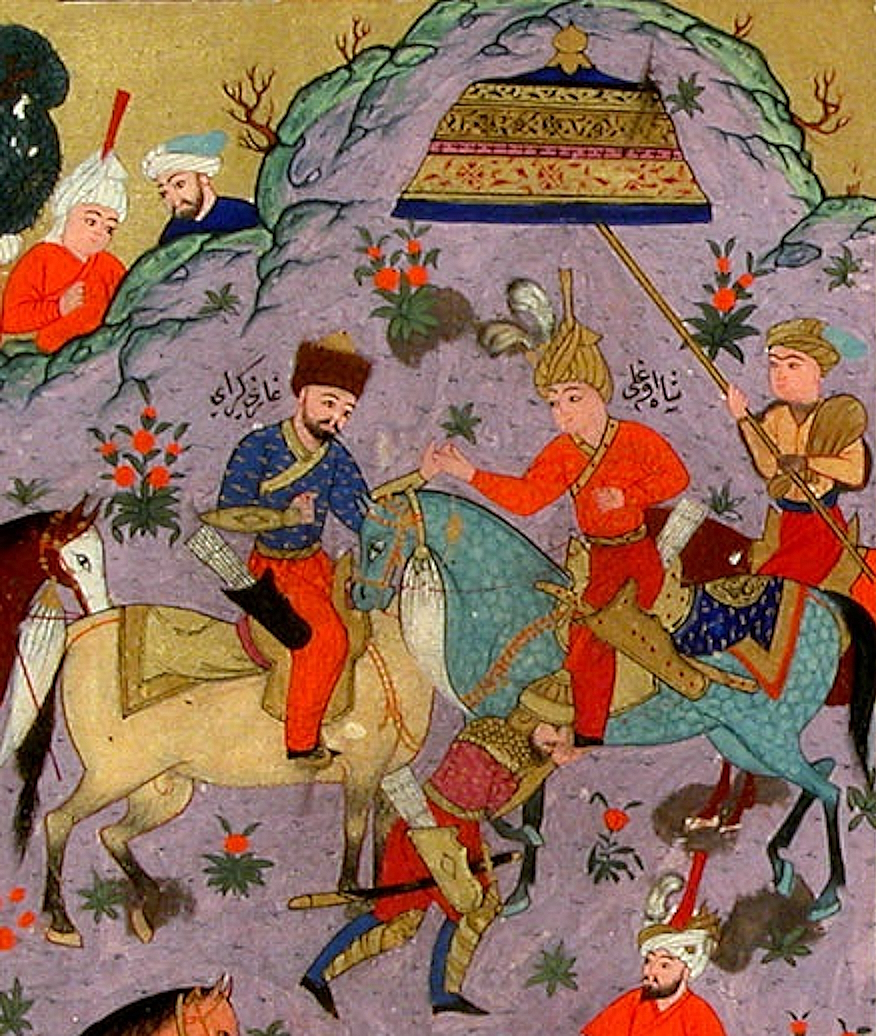
Ghazi Giray (left) surrendering to Hamza Mirza

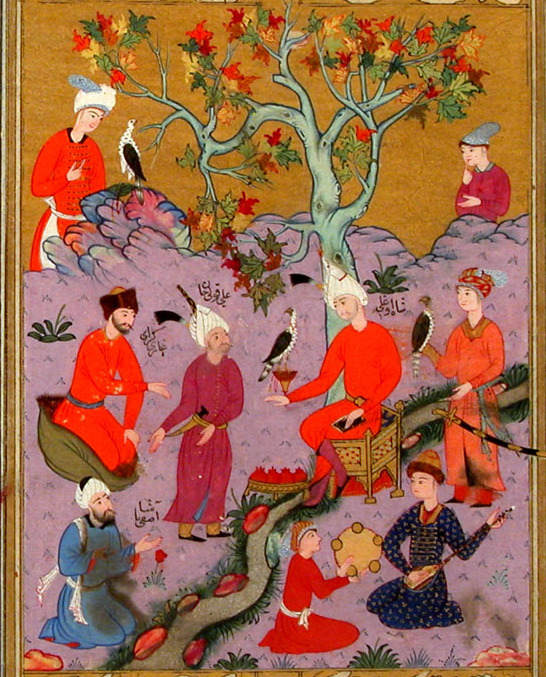
Ğazı II Giray (center left) in captivity under the Safavid Hamza Mirza (sitting under the tree)

He managed to escape after he was transferred to Tabriz, crossing the border disguised as a dervish. He rejoined Özdemiroğlu Osman Pasha in Erzurum, who gave him the command over all of the Tatar and Circassia forces in his army. These troops, together with the Ottomans, were then ordered the advance to Tabriz, leading to the Capture of Tabriz (1585).

He continued his participation in the campaign until the death of Osman Pasha on 30 November 1585. He then traveled to Constantinople where he was granted the salyane of Yambol where he continued to live until 1588. That year he received news that he was appointed khan in place of his brother İslâm II Giray. The Ottomans chose Ğazı Giray due to his familiarity with the inner workings of the empire and his experience in military affairs. Upon his arrival, his authority was not disputed by the Crimean tribal aristocracy.

== First Reign ==
Ğazı Giray's first action as khan was to appoint his brother Fetih Giray and nephew Nepht Giray as the first and second heirs apparent (Kalgay and Nura'l-din respectively) to the throne. Alp Giray and his Nura'l-din Sakay Giray fled to Constantinople and Circassia respectively. He then moved in to secure the khanate's external borders from the Cossacks who had stepped up their raids following the death of Stephen Báthory in 1586. A fort was erected on the mouth of river Dnieper and a punitive expedition was launched on Podolia. The expansion of Russian influence in the Caucasus the successive reigns of Ivan the Terrible and Feodor I caused concern in Crimea. Ğazı Giray seized opportunity of a Swedish offer of an alliance to attack Muscovy from the south, while the Swedes invaded from the north. On 13 July 1591, the Crimeans besieged Moscow, realizing that their cavalry was no match for the city's modern fortifications they lifted the siege. The khan was wounded in the campaign, returning to his palace in a cart on 9 August. After negotiations over a peace agreement broke down Fetih Giray successfully raided Tula and Ryazan, taking numerous prisoners later to be sold in the khanate's lucrative slave markets. Fearing a war on two fronts the Muscovites yielded, gifting the khan 10,000 rubles and agreeing to withdraw the Cossacks from Terek and Don. In return the Tatars swore not to attack Russia during the summer of 1594, the agreement was concluded in October 1593. The agreement paved the way for the Crimean intervention into the Long Turkish War in Hungary, while Russia was able to augment its northern borders.

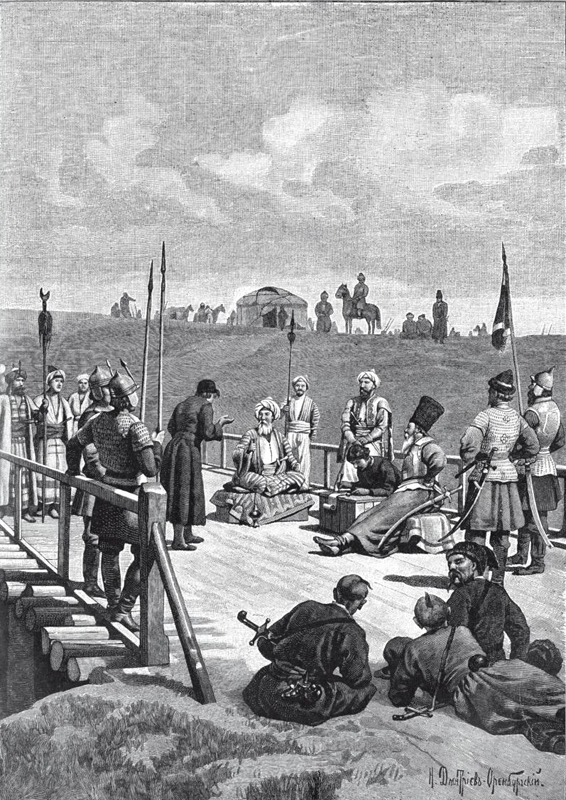
Peace negotiations between the ambassador of Khan Ğazı Giray and prince Khvorostinin on a bridge over the Sosna river in 1593.

On 28 April 1594, the Tatar army crossed into the Polish–Lithuanian Commonwealth en route to Hungary. The Tatars found the Balkan pass blocked by ruble and then marched to the so-called Tatar pass which was guarded by Kaspar Kornis an officer of the Voivode of Transylvania Sigismund Báthory and commander of the nearby Huszt castle. A battle ensued, whereupon the defenders suffered a devastating defeat. The Tatars clashed with the Hungarians under Bastuvan in Devirsin (possibly Debrecen), achieving another victory. The Tatar force united with their Ottoman allies commanded by grand vizier Koca Sinan Pasha on 31 July, the event was later celebrated by a full dress military parade and a feast. At the time the Muslim army had camped opposite of Raab and was separated from the city by the river of the same name. On 1 August, the Ottoman–Tatar army crossed the river and stormed the Raab castle, they were met by a flurry of gunfire and were forced to retreat. The following day the Ottomans began constructing a bridge across the river, enabling their musketeers and artillery to close in on their target. On 27 September, a second assault took place, it proved successful and the city fell. A part of the Crimean army was diverted to the fort of Pápa, which they found abandoned. The Muslims then besieged Komárom, however the siege was soon lifted after the advent of winter. Ğazı Giray retired to his winter quarters after leaving 2,000 of his men to garrison Pápa and Székesfehérvár.

The palace intrigues surrounding the death of sultan Murad III frustrated Ottoman plans in Hungary. More importantly Wallachian voivode Michael the Brave and voivode of Moldavia Aaron the Tyrant had revolted against Ottoman authority. In late January 1595, the Tatars now loaded with booty began their journey home. Upon crossing the frozen Danube into Wallachia they were attacked by Michael's troops, suffering a devastating defeat they fell back to Silistra. The Khan informed the grand vizier Serdar Ferhad Pasha of the new state of affairs in Wallachia and urged him to dispatch a fleet to Ochakiv in order to ferry a 100,000 man army under Fetih Giray to the Balkans. The khan spent the summer in Crimea. The arrival of Fetih's army in September coincided with the Ottoman decision to transform Wallachia and Moldavia from tributary states into beylerbeyliks. Ğazı Giray seized the opportunity and requested that one of his relatives be appointed governor of the new province. The Ottomans feared that the Tatars would merge Moldavia with the rest of the khanate and instead appointed Ahmed Bey to the position. The Tatars conquered Moldavia after vanquishing Sigismund Báthory's and Ștefan Răzvan's forces. The Poles reacted by tasking Jan Zamoyski with checking the Tatar advance in the region. The two sides fought the Battle of Cecora (1595) on 19 September, before agreeing to mutually withdraw and recognize Ieremia Movilă as the new Moldavian voivode. The khan wintered in Bender, launching numerous diversionary raids into Wallachia while Fetih Giray besieged Eger with the Ottomans. In the meantime, the Habsburgs had crossed the swamps in the Eger area posing a threat to the Muslim army. The two sides engaged in the Battle of Keresztes on 26 October 1596. The Muslims emerged victorious at the conclusion of the battle, the largest to take place during the course of the war.

== Second Reign ==
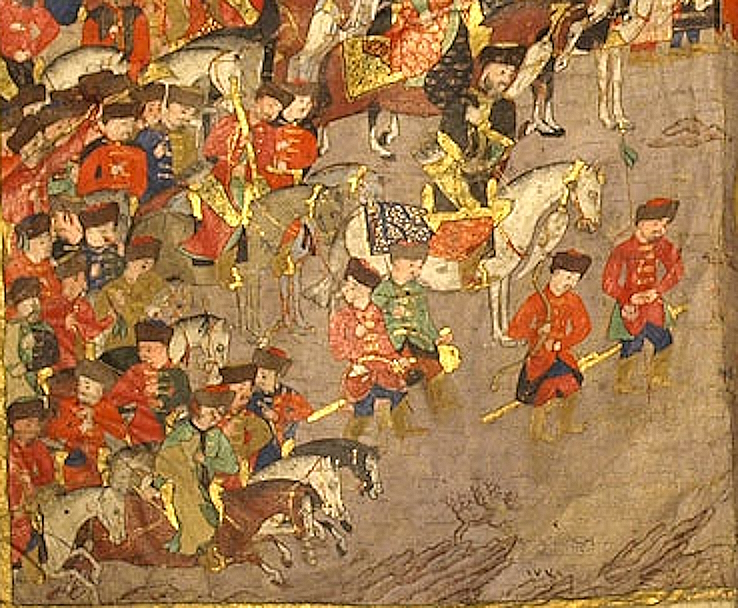
Crimean Khanate army of Ğazı II Giray, joining the troops of Mehmed III, circa 1600

Cığalazade Yusuf Sinan Pasha was appointed Grand Vizier in recognition of his role in the battle. He immediately dismissed Ğazı Giray and elevated Fetih I Giray to khan. Ğazı Giray's refusal to personally participate in the campaign, alleged separatist tendencies and his aspirations over Moldavia being the main reasons behind the downfall. Ğazı Giray addressed a letter to the sultan claiming that he was preoccupied by the defense of Wallachia from Michael the Brave and that his dismissal was unjust since he did not engage in bribery, revolt or oppression of rayah. Although he was supported by a number of viziers, his letter had not achieved the desired effect and the sultan remained true to his word. Fetih accepted his new role with reluctance as he only commanded 20,000 soldiers and the Ottomans were unable to provide him with reinforcements due to their commitments in Hungary. Fetih built his network of supporters around the relatives of Selamet Giray and Baht Giray. However his influence was still limited and the Tatar army demanded that the old khan be brought back. Cığalazade was dismissed only 20 days after his appointment further complicating the situation, the new grand vizier Damat Ibrahim Pasha supported the idea of reinstating Ğazı Giray. The sultan prepared two different letters of confirmation one for Fetih and another for Ğazı, instructing his representative Hamdan Agha to grant the letter to the candidate with the biggest base of support among the Tatars. Unbeknownst to the sultan Hamdan Agha had been a long time personal friend of Ğazı Giray, giving him the letter along with the regalia. Fearing for his safety Fetih fled to the Circassian controlled Taman Peninsula, he took the decision to meet Ğazı Giray one last time before departing for Constantinople. He was murdered by a member of the Mangit tribe outside of Kefe, Baht Giray met a similar fate. Selamet Giray avoided the power struggle by remaining in Circassia. Fetih's reign of three months was thus cut short and Ğazı Giray regained control over the khanate in early 1597.

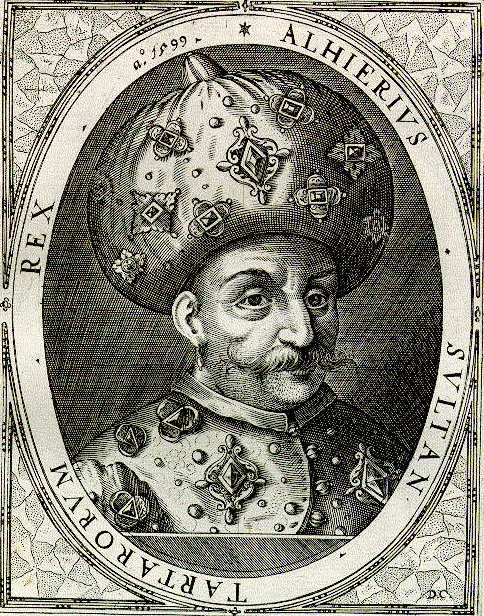
European rendition of Gazy II Giray

The khan refused to take part in the 1597 Ottoman campaign in Hungary. After renewing the truce with Russia, he sent envoys to Poland, Wallachia and Moldavia in an attempt to gain concessions. The Crimean army returned to the Balkans in July 1598. The khan served as an intermediary between the sultan and emperor Rudolf II, as the Ottomans sought to divert forces to Anatolia due to the outbreak of the Celali rebellions. The Tatars joined the Ottoman war camp at Beckerek on 29 August, afterwards the khan took active part in the planning of the upcoming offensive in Wallachia. Marching along the Moros river, the Muslims conquered the small fort of Canat before besieging their main target Varad on 1 October. Major shortages in gunpowder and ammunition, as well as difficult weather conditions rendered the siege unsuccessful. The Habsburgs had exploited the diversion of Ottoman troops to Wallachia by seizing Tata, Várpalota and Veszprém, as well as encircling Buda. The khan spent the winter in Sombor, while the Tatar contingent was stationed in Szeged. Citing shortages in provisions the khan declared that the Crimeans would return home despite repeated Ottoman requests for him to remain, this may be attributed to bribes he had received from Rudolf II. He remained within the khanate until 1602, during that time he had fallen seriously ill. He accused his wife of bewitching him, leading to her execution. In 1601, he learned that Nura'l-din Devlet Giray had conspired with a number of Mirzas to assassinate and take power for themselves. The plotters were invited to a feast where they were gunned down by arquebusiers. Devlet Giray's brothers fled either to Circassia or Anatolia with Selamet Giray following suit. In late August 1602, the khan once again set off for the Hungarian plains. On 23 September, the Tatars were defeated in the battle of Telzayn, whereupon the fell back to Silistria and united with the Ottomans in the middle of October.

Ğazı Giray spent the winter in Pécs, while his army commenced raids on the Međimurje mountains, Lugoj, Sebeș, Tokaj, rivers Krka and Rába. The Tatars rode home at the end of the winter after the sultan failed to satisfy their monetary demands. Little is known about the last years of the khan's life. He did not campaign in person, sending his son and kalgay Toqtamış Giray to Hungary in 1604. He erected the castle of Gazikerman in Circassia, dying from a plague outbreak shortly afterwards (November 1607). Toqtamış Giray succeeded him as khan following his death.

== Sources ==
- Eravci, H. Mustafa (18 April 2023). "The Role of the Crimean Tatars in the Ottoman-Safavi Wars". Selçuk Üniversitesi Türkiyat Araştırmaları Dergisi (57): 25. doi:10.21563/sutad.1285102.
- Türk, Ahmet (2000). "The Crimean Khanate Under the Reign of Ğazı II Giray". Bilkent University Thesis. Bilkent University: 1–134. hdl:11693/16983.

Preceded by Saadet II Giray	Khan of Crimea; 1588–1596	Succeeded by Fetih I Giray
Preceded by Fetih I Giray	Khan of Crimea; 1597–1607	Succeeded by Toqtamış Giray
