= Saadet II Giray =

Khan of Crimea in 1584

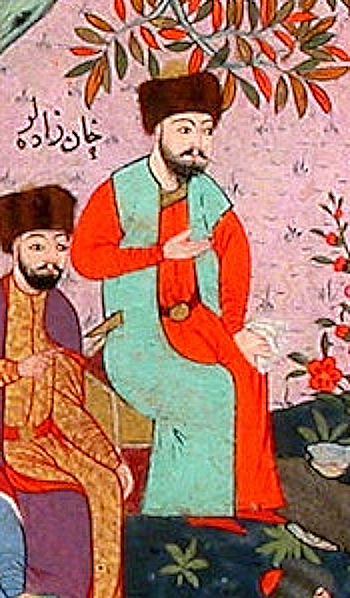
- The "Son of the Khan" (خان زاده, Khan Zade) in an interview with Osman Pasha in 1583-84. Şecāʿatnāme (1586)

Khan of the Tatar Crimean Khanate
- Reign: 1584
- Predecessor: Mehmed II Giray
- Successor: İslâm II Giray
- Born: unknown
- Died: 1587
- Dynasty: Giray dynasty
- Religion: Islam

Saadet II Giray (Note: Crimean Tatar, Ottoman Turkish and Persian: سعادت کرای ثانی) (reigned 1584) was nominally a khan of the Crimean Khanate. More accurately, he rebelled against his uncle and called himself khan, but was soon driven out.

He was the son of Mehmed II Giray. When the Turks replaced Mehmed with İslâm II, Mehmed fled but was caught and killed. His sons reached safety on the steppes. Less than three months later, Saadet returned with an army. Saadet took the capital and had the nobles name him khan. Islyam appealed to the Turks who sent troops and drove Saadet out of Crimea. He died at Astrakhan around 1588, possibly murdered by the Russians.

For a fuller account see his father Mehmed II Giray and his adversary İslâm II Giray.

== His sons ==
- Kumyk: Probably poisoned by Russians in Astrakhan along with his uncle Murad
- Devlet: Nureddin under Gazi II; in 1601 planned to rebel but was killed.
- Shahin Giray: Escaped after Devlet was killed, active until 1641.
- Mehmed III Giray: Escaped after Devlet was killed, killed Tokhtamysh, later khan.
