= Kalga (title) =

High-ranking official in the Crimean Khanate

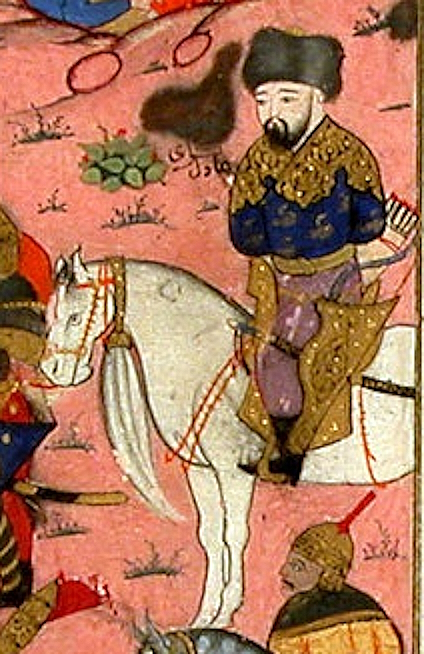
Crimean Khanate Kalga commander Adil Giray Khan, brother of Mehmed II Giray, captured by the Safavids in Shirvan in November 1587. Şeca'atname (1598)

Kalga (Ukrainian: Калга Russian: Калга Crimean Tatar: qalğa, قالغا Arabic: كالغا Turkish: kalgay Georgian: კალგა) was the highest-ranked official after the khan in the hierarchy of the Crimean Khanate.

The title of kalga was introduced in 1486 by Meñli I Giray for his son Mehmed Geray in order to establish a firm order of succession to the throne. Prior to that, power in the Golden Horde was inherited by a senior member of the khan's family, which led to endless strife. This may have been Mengli's intention, but in later reigns the khanship usually went to one of the khan's relatives without much regard to who had been kalga. The khan, kalga and nureddin were always members of the Giray clan. From an early date the khans were confirmed by the Ottoman Sultan. From the seventeenth century khans were increasingly installed and removed by the Turks.

The successor to the Crimean Khan or a trusted member of the Khan's family was appointed to the position of kalga. In the event of the death of khan, the kalga ruled the country until the appointment of a new monarch. He was also the commander in chief of the army if the khan did not go to war personally. The kalga had a residence in Simferopol, known as Ak-Mosque at the time, and ruled the city of Bilohirsk, known as Karasubazar at the time, and its environs.

== Other Crimean titles ==
- The nureddin (Nur al-Din) was third in rank after the khan and kalga. This title was introduced in 1578 or 1579 by Mehmed the Fat. Like the kalga, he was normally a close relative of the khan. His official residence was at Bakhchisarai and he had his own officials, but not as many as his superiors. The nureddin was sometimes unofficially associated with the Mansur clan in the northwestern steppe-like part of the peninsula and therefore with the steppe nomads, just as the kalga was sometimes unofficially associated with the Shirin clan in the east and therefore with the Turks at Kaffa.
- The Or-Beg was the governor of Perekop. Howorth calls him the third dignitary in the state, but the title is hard to find before about 1690.
- The Begs (Bey) were leaders of the Crimean clans.
- Mirza was a title used by some Nogai chiefs.
- The Seraskers (Serasker) were Crimean agents in the Nogai hordes, especially Budjak and Kuban. The title first appears perhaps around 1700.
- Sultan was an honorific sometimes given to members of the Giray clan in Turkish sources.
