= Arslan Giray =

Khan of the Crimean Khanate (1692–1768)

- The Giray Tamga of the Giray dynasty

Khan of the Tatar Crimean Khanate
- Reign: 1748–1756
- Predecessor: Selim II Giray
- Successor: Halim Giray
- Reign: 1767–1767
- Predecessor: Selim III Giray
- Successor: Maqsud Giray
- Born: 1692; Ottoman Empire
- Died: 1767 (aged 74–75); Căușeni, Moldavia
- Burial: Bakhchysarai
- Issue: Devlet IV Giray; Şahbaz Geray
- Dynasty: Giray dynasty
- Father: Devlet II Giray
- Religion: Sunni Islam

Arslan Giray (Note: Crimean Tatar, Ottoman Turkish and Persian: ارسلان کرای) (1692–1768) was Khan of the Crimean Khanate from 1748 to 1756 and again in 1767. He was the second son of Devlet II Giray. Arslan's own son, Devlet IV Giray, acceded to the khanship in 1769, and his grandson was the historian Halim Giray. Two of Arslan's brothers were also khans: Fetih II Giray (1736) and Qırım Giray (1758). He was said to be noble, brave, and respected by his subjects. His name means "lion".

In 1735–1736 Arslan was nureddin under his uncle Qaplan I Giray at the time of the first Russian invasion. In 1736–1737 he was kalga under his brother Fetih II Giray at the time of the second Russian invasion. The next khans were Meñli II Giray (1737), Selâmet II Giray (1740), and Selim II Giray (1743).

== First reign, 1748–1756 ==
Arslan was enthroned in May/June 1748. His kalga was Selim, a son of Fetih II. His nureddin was his brother and future khan Qırım Giray. Qirim was later replaced by Maksud, a son of Selyamet II.

He continued to rebuild Crimea following the Russian invasions of 1736–1738. He added a west wing to his palace, strengthened Perekop, Arabat, and other forts, and built mosques, madrasas, and public fountains.

Russia had now advanced far enough south to threaten both Crimea and Turkey. Russia pressed Turkey to press Crimea to hold down border raids. The reduction of raiding probably reduced Crimean incomes. Arslan gained control over unruly members of the Giray clan by giving them honorable posts in Crimea. The Ottomans praised him for keeping peace with Poland and Russia. In February/March 1756, he lost the throne, possibly due to intrigues in Istanbul.

== 1756–1767 ==
The next khans were Halim Giray (1756), Qırım Giray (1758), and Selim III Giray (1765). In 1758 Arslan was called to replace Halim, but the Crimeans opposed this and Qırım was chosen instead.

== Second reign and death (1767) ==
Arslan was appointed khan for the second time in 1767, apparently in Istanbul. He appointed as kalga his son and future khan Devlet IV Giray. Three months later, on his way to Crimea, Arslan died near Căușeni in Moldavia. His coffin was taken to Bakhchisarai and buried there.

== Sources ==
- Henry Hoyle Howorth, History of the Mongols, 1880, Part 2, pp 582-583.
- Smirnov, Krimskoye Khanstvo b XVIII Beke, 1887, Chapter 4 paragraphs 10 through 18 http://www.krimoved-library.ru/books/krimskoe-hanstvo-v-xviii-veke4.html (in Russian)

Preceded by Selim II Giray	Khan of Crimea; 1748–1756	Succeeded by Halim Giray
Preceded by Selim III Giray	Khan of Crimea; 1767	Succeeded by Maqsud Giray
