= 1783 Russian annexation of Crimea =

1783 annexation of territory

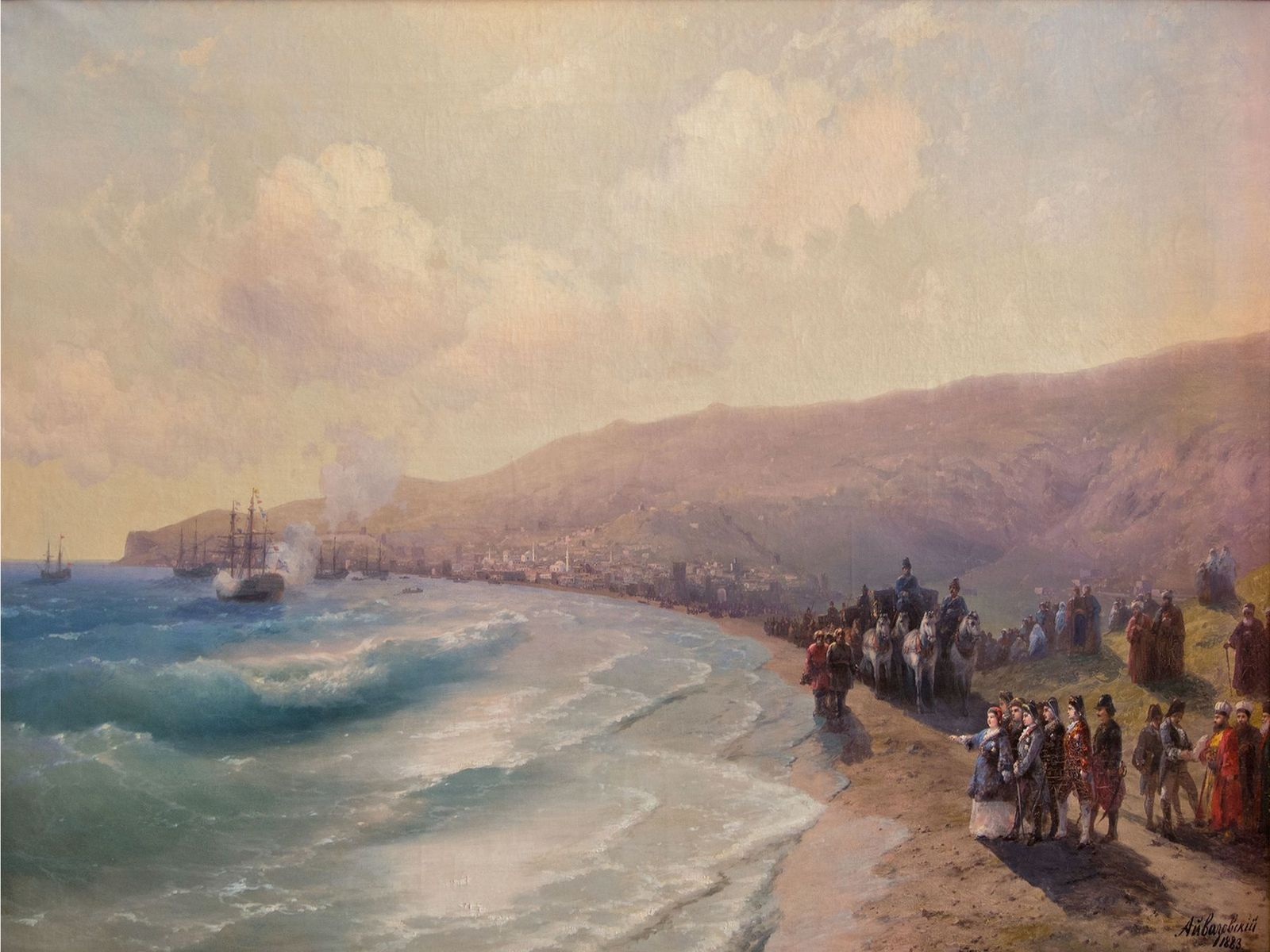
- Arrival of Catherine II in Feodosia, painting by Ivan Aivazovsky (1883)
- Date: 19 April [O.S. 8 April] 1783
- Location: Crimean Khanate
- Outcome: Crimean Khanate annexed by Russian Empire

The Russian Empire formally annexed the Crimean Khanate on 19 April [O.S. 8 April] 1783, following a decade-long campaign of intervention in the Crimean Peninsula. Russia aimed to control the Black Sea and end raids by Crimean slavers into its territory. To accomplish this, the Russians waged a series of wars against the Ottoman Empire and its Crimean vassal state, culminating in victory in the 1768–1774 Russo-Turkish War. The Treaty of Küçük Kaynarca, signed in 1774, granted the Crimean Khanate nominal independence from the Ottomans under Russian influence. In subsequent years, Russia would intervene widely in Crimean affairs, provoking a series of revolts by the Crimean Tatars, while the Ottomans watched in ambivalence. Crimea was finally annexed by Russia on 19 April 1783, after Russian imperial advisor Prince Grigory Potemkin encouraged Empress Catherine the Great to dissolve the khanate and formally claim its territory. The annexation ended the centuries-long Crimean slave trade. Under Russian administration, the former khanate was subjected to a long-term policy of de-Tatarisation. Tatar property was confiscated, and Russians were encouraged to settle in the region, sparking waves of Tatar emigration.

== Background ==
Crimea came under control of the Mongol Golden Horde in the mid-13th century AD. The Crimean Khanate was established in 1441 when Tatar Khan Hacı Giray broke away from the Horde. The khanate became an Ottoman protectorate from 1475, with the southern shore of the Crimean Peninsula incorporated directly into the Ottoman Empire as a sanjak centred on the city of Kaffa (modern Feodosia). This area was reorganised as Kaffa Eyalet in 1582. The Crimeans conducted frequent raids into neighbouring territories of Poland, Lithuania and Muscovy, capturing inhabitants and selling them as slaves to the Ottoman Empire in what is known as the "Crimean slave trade". The Muscovite government paid regular tribute to the Khanate to ransom the captives. Discontent with these raids eventually led to the Russo-Turkish War of 1735–1739, the first invasion of Crimea by the Russian Empire. The Russians ultimately withdrew, and the resulting Treaty of Niš ended the conflict. Upon Catherine the Great's accession to the Russian throne, diplomat Mikhail Illarionovich Vorontsov provided information about the khanate, suggesting to her that Russian rule of Crimea, or removal of the Ottomans from it, was the only way to vacate the danger it posed.

== Events ==
=== Crimean independence (1774–1776) ===
During the Russo-Turkish War of 1768–1774, Russia invaded Crimea. In July 1771, the Russian army marched into Kaffa, and the Ottoman governor of Kaffa Eyalet was forced to flee to Constantinople. Then leader of the Crimean Khanate, Selim Giray, surrendered to the invaders on 13 July. Selim hoped that Russia would grant Crimea independence and maintain Giray rule. By September, however, he had resigned. Under pressure from the Russians, the Crimean elite elected Sahib Giray as their new khan. In November 1771, a group of Crimean envoys led by Kalgay Şahin Giray visited Saint Petersburg to discuss the creation of an independent Crimean state under Russian protection. In November 1772, representatives of Russia and Khan Sahib concluded the Treaty of Karasu Bazaar, which proclaimed the establishment of an independent state, including the former Kaffa Eyalet, and Russo-Crimean friendship. This could not come into effect without Ottoman recognition, however, which eventually came in 1774 with their defeat and the resulting Treaty of Küçük Kaynarca, wherein Russia and the Ottoman Empire agreed to Crimean independence.

Within two months of the signing of the treaty, however, the khanate government sent envoys to the Ottomans, requesting that they "destroy the conditions of independence". The envoys said that as Russian troops remained stationed in Crimea at Yeni-Kale and Kerch, the khanate could not be considered independent. Nevertheless, the Ottomans ignored this request, not wishing to violate the agreement with Russia, which had granted it the right to garrison troops in these areas. In the disorder that followed the Turkish defeat, Tatar leader Devlet Giray refused to accept the treaty at the time of its signing. Having been fighting Russians in the Kuban during the war, he crossed the Kerch Strait to Crimea and seized Kaffa. Devlet subsequently seized the Crimean throne, usurping Khan Sahib. Despite his actions against the Russians, Russian empress Catherine the Great recognised Devlet as Khan.

At the same time, however, she was grooming her favourite Şahin Giray, now resident at her court, for the role. As time went on, the rule of Devlet became increasingly untenable. In July 1775, he sent a group of envoys to Constantinople to negotiate a re-entry of the Crimean Khanate into the Ottoman Empire. This action was in direct defiance of the Treaty of Küçük Kaynarca, which he asked the Ottomans to scrap. Famed diplomat Ahmed Resmî Efendi, who had helped draft the treaty, refused to provide any assistance to the khanate, not wanting to start another disastrous war with Russia. Catherine gave an order to invade Crimea in November 1776. Her forces quickly gained control of Perekop, at the entrance to the peninsula. In January 1777, Russian-supported Şahin Giray crossed into Crimea over the Kerch Strait, much as Devlet had done. Devlet, aware of his impending defeat, abdicated and fled to Constantinople. Şahin was installed as a puppet Khan, infuriating the Muslim population of the peninsula. When he heard this news, Ottoman Sultan Abdul Hamid I noted "Şahin Giray is a tool. The aim of the Russians is to take Crimea." Şahin, a member of the ruling House of Giray, attempted a series of reforms to "modernise" the khanate. These included attempts to centralise power in the hands of the Khan, establishing "autocratic" rule, much as in Russia. Previously, power had been distributed between the leaders of different clans, called beys. He attempted to institute state taxation, a conscripted and centralised army, and to replace the traditional religion-based Ottoman legal system with civil law. These reforms, aimed at disrupting the old Ottoman order, were despised by the Crimean populace.

=== Crimean revolts (1777–1782) ===
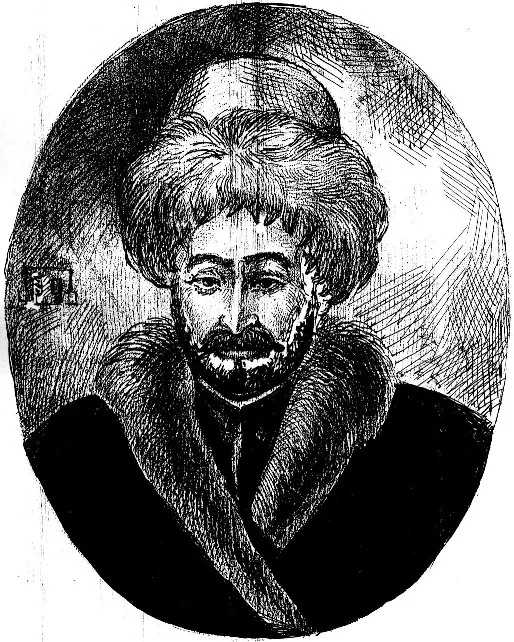
Portrait of Şahin Giray, 1780s

At the behest of Catherine, Şahin allowed Russians to settle in the peninsula, further infuriating Crimeans. A group of these settlers had been sent to Yeni-Kale, which remained under Russian control following the installation of Şahin as Khan. Local residents banded together to prevent the Russian settlement, rebelling against Şahin. He sent the new conscript army he had created to quash the rebellion, only to see his forces defect to the rebels. Revolt spread across the peninsula, and rebel forces advanced on Şahin's palace in Bakhchysarai. Amidst this rebellion, exiled Crimeans in Constantinople pressed the Ottoman government to act. Bowing to pressure, the government sent a fleet to Crimea, ostensibly to preserve the Treaty of Küçük Kaynarca. Russia, however, was quicker to act. Russian forces arrived at Yeni-Kale in February 1778, crushing the revolt before the Ottoman fleet arrived. When the fleet arrived in March, it found that there were no rebels left to support. It fought a brief skirmish with the Russian navy off Akitar (modern Sevastopol), but was "forced" to flee. Şahin was reinstated as Khan. Minor skirmishes between the Ottoman and Russian navies continued until October 1778, when the Ottoman fleet returned defeated to Constantinople.

Over the following years, Şahin continued to try and reform the khanate. Support for his reform programme remained low, and it was seriously undermined by the decision of Catherine to resettle the Crimean Pontic Greeks on the northern shores of the Azov Sea, outside the khanate. That community, which was Christian, was an essential part of the Crimean merchant class, and had most readily supported Şahin's reforms. This resettlement caused significant damage to the Crimean economy, and further weakened the position of the Khan. Recognising defeat in Crimea, the Ottoman Empire signed the Convention of Aynali Kavak in early 1779. In the agreement, the Ottomans recognised Şahin as Khan of Crimea, promised no further intervention in Crimea, and conceded that Crimea was under Russian influence. Crimeans could no longer expect support from the Ottomans. Şahin's reforms proceeded, gradually removing Tatars from positions of political influence. For a brief period, Crimea remained peaceful.

A new rebellion, sparked by the continuing marginalisation of Tatars within the khanate government, started in 1781. Various clan leaders and their forces came together in the Taman, across the Kerch Strait from Crimea. In April 1782, a large portion of Şahin's army defected to the rebels, and joined them in the Taman. Communication between rebel leaders, including two of Şahin's brothers, and the Crimean administrative elite was ongoing. Religious (ulama) and legal (kadı) officials, important parts of the old Ottoman order, openly declared their antipathy for Şahin. Rebel forces attacked Kaffa on 14 May [O.S. 3 May] 1782. Şahin's forces were swiftly defeated, and he was forced to escape to Russian-controlled Kerch. Rebel leaders elected Şahin's brother Bahadır Giray as Khan, and sent a message to the Ottoman government seeking recognition. It was not long, however, before Catherine dispatched Prince Grigory Potemkin to restore Şahin to power. No significant opposition was fielded against the invading Russians, and many rebels fled back across the Kerch Strait. As such, the Khan was restored to his position in October 1782. By this time, however, he had lost the favour of both Crimeans and Catherine. In a letter to a Russian advisor to Şahin, Catherine wrote "He must stop this shocking and cruel treatment and not give them [Crimeans] just cause for a new revolt". As Russian troops entered the peninsula, work began to establish a Black Sea warm-water port for the Empire. The city of Akitar (modern day Sevastopol) was chosen as the site of the port, which would go on to house the newly created Black Sea Fleet. Uncertainty about the sustainability of the restoration of Şahin Giray, however, led to an increase of support for annexing Crimea, spearheaded by Potemkin.

=== Formal annexation (1783) ===
In March 1783, Potemkin made a rhetorical push to encourage Catherine to annex Crimea. Having just returned from Crimea, he told her that many Crimeans would "happily" submit to Russian rule. Encouraged by this news, Catherine issued a formal proclamation of annexation on 19 April [O.S. 8 April] 1783; Şahin formally relinquished his claim to the khanate. The Tatars did not resist the annexation; after years of turmoil, the Crimeans lacked the resources and the will to continue fighting. Many fled the peninsula, leaving for Anatolia. Tens of thousands of these emigrants took up residence in Constantinople, where they formed an influential exile community, lobbying the Ottoman government to reclaim their Crimean homeland. Count Alexander Bezborodko, then a close advisor to the Empress, wrote in his diary that Russia was forced to annex Crimea by Ottoman machinations in the region:

The Porte has not kept good faith from the very beginning. Their primary goal has been to deprive the Crimeans of independence. They banished the legal khan and replaced him with the thief Devlet Giray. They consistently refused to evacuate the Taman. They made numerous perfidious attempts to introduce rebellion in the Crimea against the legitimate Khan Şahin Giray. All of these efforts did not bring us to declare war…The Porte never ceased to drink in each drop of revolt among the Tatars…Our only wish has been to bring peace to Crimea…and we were finally forced by the Turks to annex the area.

This view was far from reality. Crimean "independence" had been a puppet regime, and the Ottomans had played little role in the Crimean revolts. The Ottomans went on to recognise the loss of Crimea and other territories that had been held by the khanate in an agreement negotiated by Russian diplomat Yakov Bulgakov. Known as the Treaty of Constantinople, it was signed on 28 December 1783 [O.S. 8 January 1784]. Crimea was formally incorporated into the Empire as "Taurida Oblast" during 1784, with Potemkin serving as its first governor. Catherine visited her newly-acquired territories in an elaborate tour during 1787.

== Aftermath ==
The annexation brought an end to the Crimean slave trade, and marked the beginning of Russian-imposed de-Tatarisation of Crimea. Following his appointment as governor of the region, Potemkin moved to expropriate Tatar land and assign it to Russian nobles, sparking another wave of Tatar emigration. In 1787, Potemkin even urged of the need to curb the Tatar flight due to the negative economic impact it was having on the region, but this proved unfruitful. The Ottomans would attempt to reclaim Crimea in the Russo-Turkish War of 1787–1792, but were defeated and forced to again acknowledge Russian rule in the Treaty of Jassy. This spurred a mass exodus of Tatars from Crimea; an estimate by Arsenii Markevich suggests that the Tatar population declined from approximately 300,000 at the time of the annexation to 170,000–180,000 in the aftermath of the 1792 treaty.

== Gallery ==
Proclamation of the annexation of Crimea (19 April [O.S. 8 April] 1783)

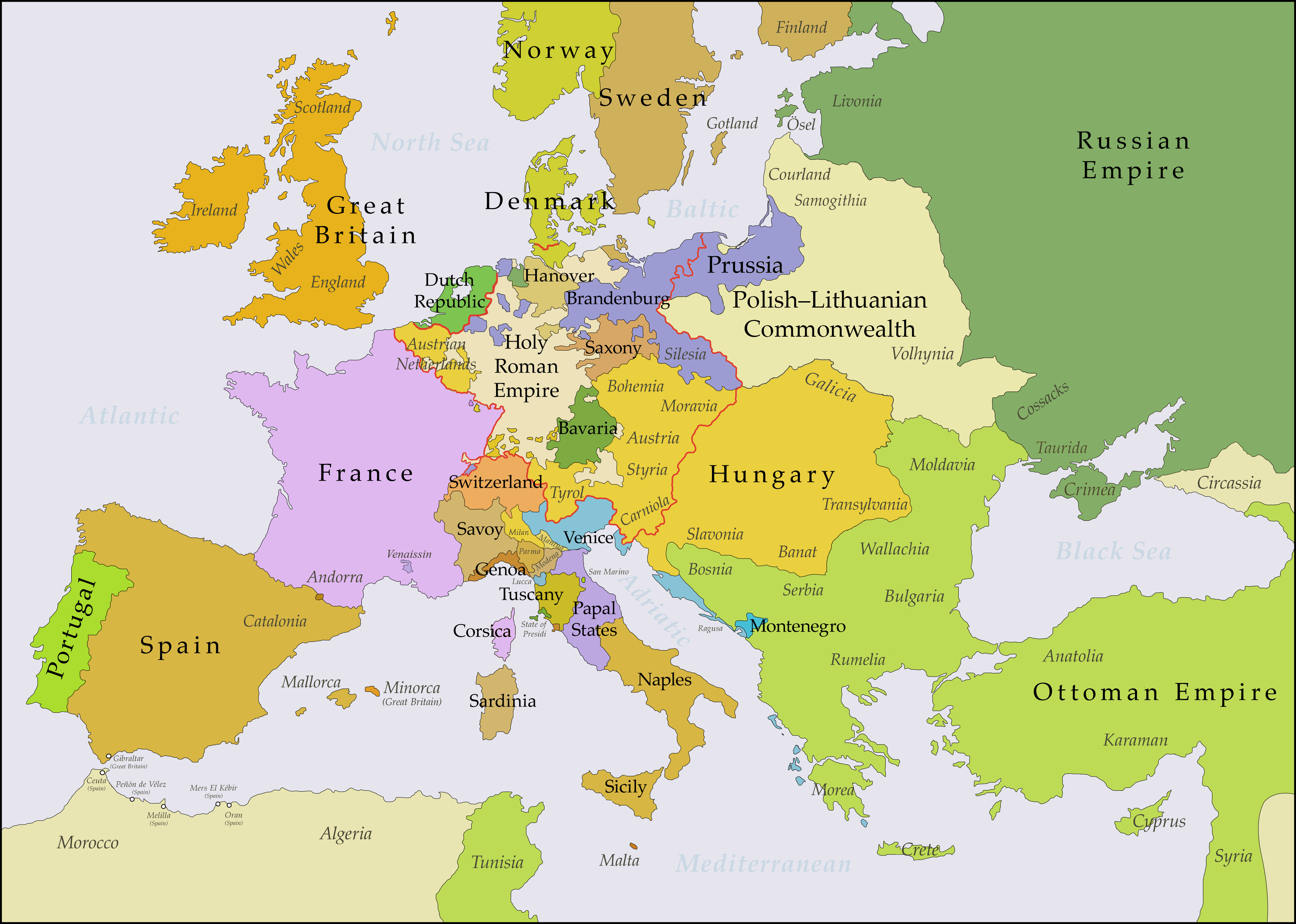
Europe after Russia's annexation of Crimea, with the north shore of the Black Sea under Russian control

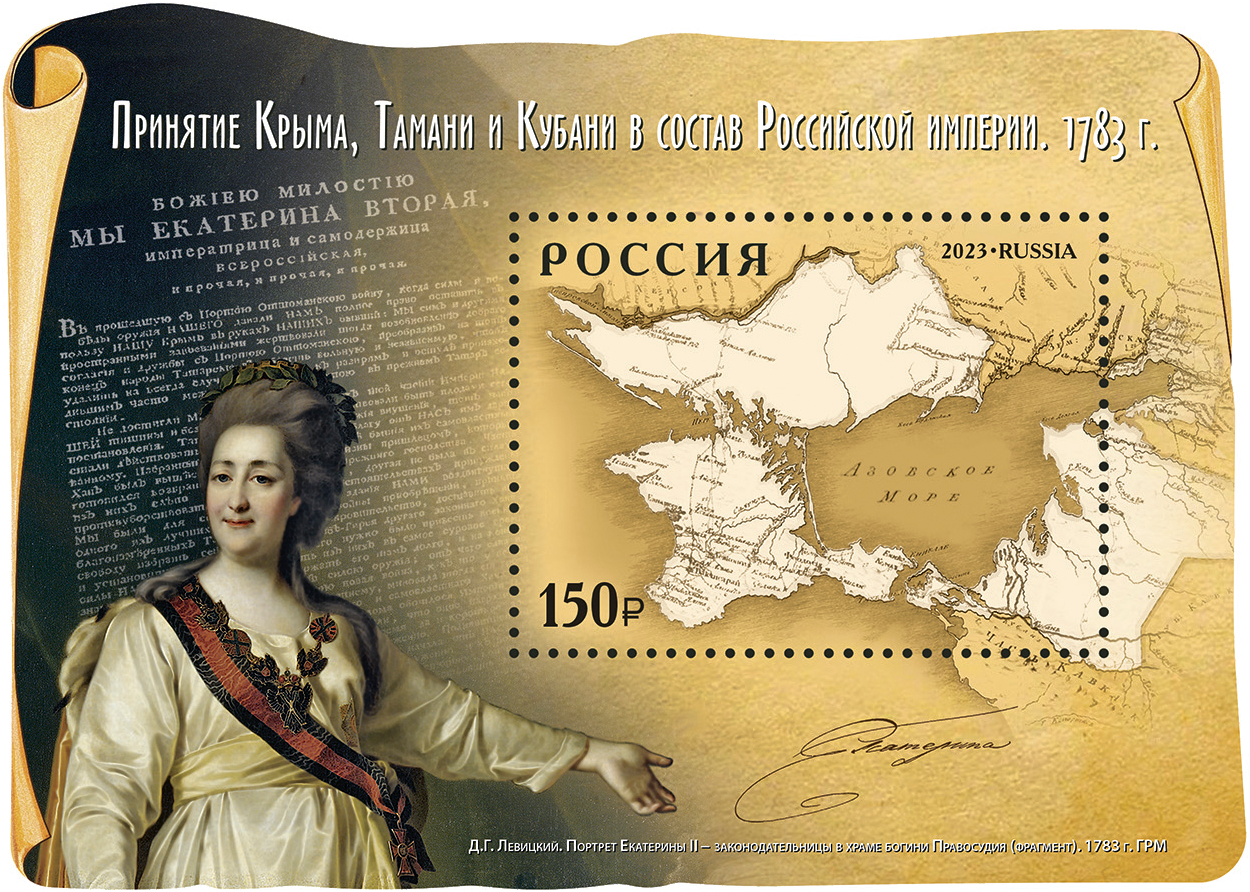
2023 stamp sheet dedicated to the annexation
