= Devlet Giray =

Devlet Giray may refer to:

- Khans of the Crimean Khanate:
  - Devlet I Giray (1512–1577), reigned from 1551 to 1577
  - Devlet II Giray (1648–1718), reigned in 1699–1702 and 1709–13
  - Devlet III Giray (1647–1717), reigned from 1716 to 1717
  - Devlet IV Giray (1730–1780), reigned in 1769–70 and 1775–77
- Various members of the Giray house, including:
  - C. 1400: Possibly the founder, according to an old source
  - C. 1588: brother of Canibek Giray
  - C. 1601: son of Saadet II Giray, killed by Gazi II Giray
  - C. 1623: the father of Adil Giray
  - C. 1756: brother of Halim Giray

== See also ==
- Devlet
- Giray (disambiguation)
