= Selim II Giray =

Khan of the Tatar Crimean Khanate
- Reign: 1743–1748
- Predecessor: Selâmet II Giray
- Successor: Arslan Giray
- Born: 1708
- Died: 29 May 1748 (aged 39–40)
- Dynasty: Giray dynasty
- Religion: Islam

Selim II Giray (Note: Crimean Tatar, Ottoman Turkish and Persian: سلیم کرای ثانی) (reigned 1743–1748, lived 1708–1748) was a khan of the Crimean Khanate. His father was Qaplan I Giray and his son was future khan Qaplan II Giray (1770). He was obedient to and praised by the Turks and kept peace with Russia by returning captives and suppressing Kuban Nogai raiding. He was nicknamed Qatti, meaning something like solid or unshakeable.

In 1742 he was made kalga by his uncle Selâmet II Giray. In November 1743 he was promoted to khan when the Turks deposed Selyamet. One reason may have been that the Ottomans wanted a stronger man if they needed Crimean troops to fight Persia.

He chose as kalga Shahin, a son of former kalga Adil. His first nureddin was Selim, a son of Kuban warlord Bakhti Giray. When nureddin Selim died he appointed Akhmed, a son of Mekhmed Giray and grandson of Devlet II Giray.

Around the time he came to the throne there was a famine in Istanbul. Selim sent significant amounts of grain.

In 1745 he was called by the Turks to fight Persia. He led 10 thousand men by ship from Gozleve while either the kalga or nureddin or Kasim Giray led either 10 or 20 thousand men overland. Our sources do not say what happened, but he is reported to have fought better than the Turks and was praised for it. This was at the time of the Ottoman–Persian War (1743–1746) when Nader Shah tried to take some traditionally Ottoman land around Kars.

In the winter of 1746/1747 he was in Istanbul for consultations. He left in February 1747 and soon dismissed kalga Shahin Giray for unknown reasons. Shahin went to Yambol but in February 1748 he went north and raised a rebellion among the Budzak Nogais. He was defeated, fled to Poland and the Turks demanded his expulsion. He was forgiven and exiled to Chios.

Selim died at Bakhchisarai in May 1748 and was followed by Arslan Giray.

== Selim II Giray fountain ==
The Selim II Giray fountain, built in 1747, is considered one of the masterpieces of Crimean Khanate's hydraulic engineering designs and is still marvelled at in modern times. It consists of small ceramic pipes, boxed in an underground stone tunnel, stretching back to the spring source more than 200 metres away, and was one of the finest sources of water in Bakhchisaray.

=== Sources and notes ===
- Henry Hoyle Howorth, History of the Mongols, 1880, Part 2, pp 581-582.
- Smirnov, Krimskoye Khanstvo b XVIII Beke, 1887, Chapter 4 http://www.krimoved-library.ru/books/krimskoe-hanstvo-v-xviii-veke4.html (in Russian)

| Preceded by Selâmet II Giray | Khan of Crimea; 1743–1748 | Succeeded by Arslan Giray |
