= Fetih II Giray =

- The Giray Tamga of the Giray dynasty

Khan of the Tatar Crimean Khanate
- Reign: 1736–1737
- Predecessor: Qaplan I Giray
- Successor: Meñli II Giray
- Born: 1696; Ottoman Empire
- Died: 1746 (aged 49–50); Vize, Ottoman Empire
- Burial: Vize
- Issue: Selim III Giray; Muhammad Giray; Kyrim Giray
- Dynasty: Giray dynasty
- Father: Devlet II Giray
- Religion: Sunni Islam

Fetih II Geray (Note: Crimean Tatar, Ottoman Turkish and Persian: فطح کرای ثانی) (reigned 1736-1737, lived 1696-1746) was a khan of the Crimean Khanate. During his brief reign Russia invaded Crimea for the second time. He was the eldest son of Devlet II Giray, one of the six brothers who held the khanship for most of the period 1699-1743. His son was future khan Selim III Giray. His brothers were future khans Arslan Giray and Qırım Giray.

During the third reign of his uncle and predecessor Qaplan I Giray he was nureddin until 1735 when he became kalga on the death of Adil Giray. In 1733 or 1734 he led a raid across to the Caspian Sea. In the summer of 1736 Russia invaded Crimea for the first time and burned the capital, for which Qaplan was removed.

== Reign ==
He became khan around August or September 1736. The Turks made him khan because of his success in 1734 and possibly because of connections in the Ottoman court. As kalga and nureddin he appointed his brothers Arslan and Mahmud. Since Bakhchisarai had been burned he established himself at Karasubazar. In revenge for the Russian invasion, in October he raided the Russian borders. In December the Don Cossacks and Kalmyks seriously defeated the Kuban Horde. Kalmyks later joined in the second Russian invasion. The Turks apparently made another retaliatory raid and took 30,000 prisoners.

In July 1737 Russia invaded Crimea for the second time and burned Karasubazar. (For a fuller account see Russo-Turkish War (1735–1739) under 1737) For this Fetih was deposed, possibly in August. He retired to the village of Chakilli near Vize northwest of Istanbul. He died in 1746 and was buried near the local mosque.

== Sources and footnotes ==
- Henry Hoyle Howorth, History of the Mongols, 1880, Part 2, pp. 579-580 (biography)
- Davies, Brian, Empire and Military Revolution in Eastern Europe, 2011, Chapter Five (military)

Preceded by Qaplan I Giray (third reign)	Khan of Crimea; 1736–1737	Succeeded by Meñli II Giray
