= Gareev =

Gareev or Gareyev (Tatar: Gərəyev, Гәрәев; Russian: Гареев) is a Tatar masculine patronymic surname derived from Tatar given name Гәрәй traditionally transliterated into English as Giray. Its feminine counterpart is Gareeva or Gareyeva.

It may refer to:

- Aigul Gareeva (born 2001), Russian racing cyclist
- Artyom Gareyev (born 1992), Russian ice hockey player
- Makhmut Gareev (1923–2019), Russian General of the Army, a historian, and a military scientist
- Musa Gareyev (1922–1987), Bashkir Soviet ace, twice Hero of the Soviet Union
- Timur Gareev (born 1988) is a chess Grandmaster from Uzbekistan
- Zufar Gareev (born 1955) is a Russian writer (prose)

== See also ==
- Garayev
