= List of Crimean khans =

Monarchy of Crimea
- Trident of Giray

Details
- First monarch: Hacı I Giray
- Last monarch: Şahin Giray
- Formed: 1441
- Abolished: 1783
- Residence: Bakhchisaray Palace
- Appointer: Kurultai
- Pretenders: Crimea; Prince Aleksei Guirey

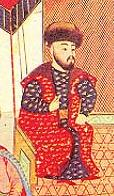
Meñli I Giray

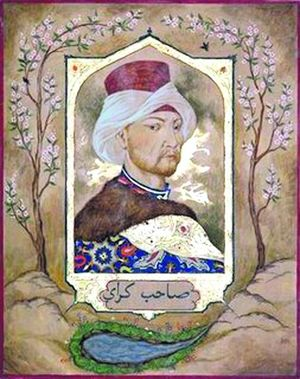
Sahib II Giray

The Crimean Khanate was a state which existed in present-day southern Ukraine (Crimea) from 1441 until 1783.

The position of Khan in Crimea was an elective monarchy and was picked by beys from four of the most noble families (also known as Qarachi beys: Argyns, Kipchaks, Shirins, and Baryns) at kurultai where the decision about a candidate was adopted. The newly elected Khan was raised on a white felt sheet and over him were read Islamic prayers, after that the Khan was triumphantly enthroned.

== List ==
The following is the chronological table of reigns of Khans of the Crimean Khanate from the Giray dynasty:

Date of Reign	Name	Notes
1441–1456	Hacı I Giray	first reign
1456	Haydar	
1456–1466	Hacı I Giray	second reign
1466–1468	Nur Devlet	first reign
1468–1474	Meñli I Giray	first reign
1474–1475	Nur Devlet	second reign
1475–1476	Meñli I Giray	second reign
1476–1477	dynasty dismissed from power	
1477	Nur Devlet	third reign
1478–1514	Meñli I Giray	third reign
1514–1523	Mehmed I Giray	
1523–1524	Ğazı I Giray	
1524–1532	Saadet I Girai	
1532	İslâm I Giray	
1532–1551	Sahib I Giray	
1551–1577	Devlet I Giray	
1577–1584	Mehmed II Giray	
1584	Saadet II Giray	
1584–1588	İslâm II Giray	
1588–1596	Ğazı II Giray	first reign
1596	Fetih I Giray	
1596–1607	Ğazı II Giray	second reign
1607–1608	Toqtamış Giray	
1608–1610	Selâmet I Giray	
1610–1623	Canibek Giray	first reign
1623–1628	Mehmed III Giray	†
1628–1635	Canibek Giray	second reign
1635–1637	İnayet Giray	
1637–1641	Bahadır I Giray	
1641–1644	Mehmed IV Giray	first reign
1644–1654	İslâm III Giray	
1654–1666	Mehmed IV Giray	second reign
1666–1671	Adil Giray	
1671–1678	Selim I Giray	first reign
1678–1683	Murad Giray	
1683–1684	Haci II Giray	
1684–1691	Selim I Giray	second reign
1691	Saadet III Giray	
1691–1692	Safa Giray	
1692–1699	Selim I Giray	third reign
1699–1702	Devlet II Giray	first reign
1702–1704	Selim I Giray	fourth reign
1704–1707	Ğazı III Giray	
1707–1708	Qaplan I Giray	first reign
1709–1713	Devlet II Giray	second reign
1713–1715	Qaplan I Giray	second reign
1716–1717	Devlet III Giray	
1717–1724	Saadet IV Giray	
1724–1730	Meñli II Giray	first reign
1730–1736	Qaplan I Giray	third reign
1736–1737	Fetih II Giray	
1737–1740	Meñli II Giray	second reign
1740–1743	Selâmet II Giray	
1743–1748	Selim II Giray	
1748–1756	Arslan Giray	first reign
1756–1758	Halim Giray	
1758–1764	Qırım Giray	first reign
1765–1767	Selim III Giray	first reign
1767	Arslan Giray	second reign
1767–1768	Maqsud Giray	
1768–1769	Qırım Giray	second reign
1769–1770	Devlet IV Giray	first reign
1770	Qaplan II Giray	
1770–1771	Selim III Giray	second reign
1771–1775	Sahib II Giray	†
1775–1777	Devlet IV Giray	second reign
1777–1782	Şahin Giray	first reign
1782	Bahadır II Giray	
1782–1783	Şahin Giray	second reign
† The reigns of Canibek Giray in 1624 and of Maqsud Giray in 1771–1772 are not listed. Though these khans were formally appointed by Ottoman sultans they did not reach the throne and did not rule Crimea. In the years mentioned, the authority in the Crimean Khanate was exercised by Mehmed III Giray and Sahib II Giray correspondingly.
