= Meñli II Giray =

Khan of Crimean khanate

- The Giray Tamga of the Giray dynasty

Khan of the Tatar Crimean Khanate
- Reign: 1724–1730
- Predecessor: Saadet IV Giray
- Successor: Qaplan I Giray
- Reign: 1737–1740
- Predecessor: Fetih II Giray
- Successor: Selâmet II Giray
- Born: 1678; Rhodes, Ottoman Empire
- Died: 9 January 1740 (aged 61–62); Bakhchysarai, Ottoman Empire
- Burial: Bakhchysarai
- Dynasty: Giray dynasty
- Father: Selim I Giray
- Religion: Sunni Islam

Mengli II Giray (Note: Crimean Tatar, Ottoman Turkish and Persian: منکلی کرای ثانی) (1678–1740) was twice khan of the Crimean Khanate (1724–1730 and 1737–1740). He was a son of khan Selim I Giray and thus one of the six brothers who were khans during most of the period from 1699 to 1742. He was said to be intelligent, a lover of literature and involved with the Sufi order. He funded mosques and madrassas in Crimea, Budjak, and Istanbul. During his first reign he regained control the Crimean nobles and then the Nogais in Budjak and the Kuban region.

He was born in 1678 on the isle of Rhodes during his father's first exile. In 1704–1707 he was nureddin under his brother Ğazı III Giray. In 1707–1708 and 1713–1715 he was kalga during the first two reigns of his brother Qaplan I Giray. When Qaplan quit he settled at Kadykey near Silistra.

== First Reign 1724–1730 ==
When Saadet IV Giray gave up the throne there was talk of reappointing Qaplan, but Mengli was chosen (September–October 1724 = muharram 1137AH)

His kalgas were Safa, a brother of Saadet IV, then Adil and then Salyamet. The last two were Mengli's brothers. His first nureddin was Selyamet, who was later promoted to kalga, then Salih, a son of Saadet IV.

His first task was to regain control of the nobles who has been disobedient during the previous reign. Before reaching Crimea he sent ahead letters confirming most of them in their current positions, as if nothing had happened. He slowly built up alliances. When the Turks called for Crimean troops to fight the Persians (below) he sent many of the malcontents, including Safa and many of the Shirins. When they were surrounded by Turkish troops he sent an order to liquidate them. Several were hung and Safa was exiled to Chios, and later to Yambol. The next problem was a man called Jan Timur. After various meneuvres he was summoned to the palace (around July 1726). Forewarned, he and his friends fled to the Turks at Azov, and then to the Circassians. With his main enemies out of the way he redistributed fiefs and offices to create an obedient nobility.

In 1725 Istanbul requested 10,000 Crimean troops to fight the Persians. They went under the command of kalga Safa, nureddin Selyamet and Mengli's son Tokhtamysh. Readily available sources do not say what they did. This was during the Ottoman–Hotaki War (1726–1727) when the Persian ruler tried to regain the northwest part of their empire which had been taken by the Turks. They crossed the Bosporus in July–August 1725 and returned via Trabzond toward the end of 1726. Some seem to have remained since in mid-September 1727 kalga Adil Gray was removed for refusing to lead troops against Persia. See "Note on Crimeans fighting Persians" at bottom.

When Jan Timur fled to Circassia he was protected by Bakht Giray, the warlord son of Devlet II. An army was sent and Vakht made a partial submission (year uncertain). When Adil was removed he went first to an estate near Yambol and then raised a rebellion among the Budjak Nogais in favor of the restoration of Qaplan I. The revolt was suppressed by the local Turkish governors and Adil was forgiven and retired to his estate. This ended about March 1728.

In May 1729 Mengli went to Istanbul where he was congratulated by the Sultan for restoring order in Crimea. In November 1730 Mengli was deposed. The sources do not explain why but all agree that his deposition was connected with the coup that overthrew sultan Ahmad III. Mengli went into exile at Rhodes.

== 1730–1737 ==
1730 Qaplan I Giray was appointed for the third time. In 1736 Russia made its first invasion of Crimea and burned the capital. For this Qaplan was replaced by Fetih II Giray (fall 1736). In 1737 Russia invaded again and Fetih was replaced by Mengli who had proven himself strong during his first reign.

== Second reign and death (1737–1740) ==
He was appointed khan in late summer of 1737. As kalga he chose his brother, the future Selâmet II Giray. As nureddin he appointed Salih, who soon died and was replaced by Halim Giray, a son of his brother Saadet IV Giray. Halim became khan in 1756. In February 1738 he raided the Russian frontier without much success. In the summer of 1738 the Russians invaded Crimea for the third time (see Russo-Turkish War (1735–1739) under 1738). As usual, they soon withdrew. In February 1739, as the war was winding down, Istanbul sent an envoy to ask his advice. Among other things, he suggested that Azov be abandoned because it was too distant to control. In the summer of 1739 a Russian army tried to invade Crimea from Azov but was forced to turn back. Mengli grew ill, was taken to Bakhchisarai and died on 9 January 1740.

== First reign: Crimean troops against Persia ==
This seems to be the first time since 1637 that the Ottomans demanded Crimean troops to fight Persia. Such campaigns were always unpopular because of the long distances involved and the small chance of loot. For reference, they demanded Crimean troops to fight Persia in, at least: 1551 Sahib, 1584 Mehmed II, 1616 Canibek, 1624 Mehmed III, 1637 Canibek, 1637 Inayet, 1725 Mengli, 1732 Qaplan I (Crimean initiative against Persian vassals in Dagestan).

In Persia in 1722 an Afghan called Mahmud Hotak rebelled and made himself Shah of Persia. The son of the deposed Shah, Tahmasp II, organized a weak resistance. The Russians and Turks took advantage of Persian weakness and invaded. Tahmasp sought their support against Mahmud. In June 1724, about four months before Mengli became khan, the two powers signed a treaty in which Russia took the west side of the Caspian and Turkey took approximately modern Georgia and Armenia. Tahmasp's general Nader Shah began to restore Persian power. About nine months before Mengli was dethroned, Nader's encroachment on Turkish territory led to the Ottoman–Persian War (1730–1735).

== Sources and notes ==
- Smirnov, Krimskoye Khanstvo b XVIII Beke, 1887, Chapter 2, Paragraphs 13 through 30: http://www.krimoved-library.ru/books/krimskoe-hanstvo-v-xviii-veke2.html (in Russian)
- Giray-Ilim: Rose Bush of Khans, compiled by Khalim Giray in 1811, modernized Turkish with many additions by Ablyakim Ilim (before 1947), Russian translation with additions and deletions of obsolete material by Kemal Usenov, 2004. http://www.vostlit.info/Texts/Dokumenty/Krym/XV/Rozovyj_kust_chanov/29.phtml?id=12949. (in Russian)
- Giray family tree: Oleksa Gaivoronsky «Повелители двух материков», Kiev-Bakhchisarai, second edition, 2010, volume 2, endpaper (in Russian)
- Second reign military: Brian Davies, Empire and Military Revolution in Eastern Europe: Russia's Turkish Wars in the Eighteenth Century, 2011
- Desaive Dilek, Gökbilgin Özalp, "Le khanat de Crimée et les campagnes militaires de l'Empire ottoman : Fin du XVIIe -début du XVIIIe siècle, 1687-1736", in Cahiers du monde russe et soviétique, vol. 11, n° 1, p. 110-117. (in French)

Preceded by Saadet IV Giray	Khan of Crimea; 1724–1730	Succeeded by Qaplan I Giray (third reign)
Preceded by Fetih II Giray	Khan of Crimea; 1737–1740	Succeeded by Selâmet II Giray
