= Karayev =

Karayev or Karaev (Russian: Караев) is a masculine surname, its feminine counterpart is Karayeva or Karaeva. It may refer to

- Alan Karaev (born 1977), Russian sumo wrestler
- David Karayev (born 1995), Russian football midfielder
- Dzhuma Durdy Karayev (1910–1960), Turkmen politician
- Kara Karayev (1918–1982), Azerbaijani composer
- Ruslan Karaev (born 1983), Russian-Ossetian kickboxer
- Vitaly Karayev (1962–2008), Russian politician

== See also ==
- Garayev
