= Selâmet II Giray =

- The Giray Tamga of the Giray dynasty

Khan of the Tatar Crimean Khanate
- Reign: 1740–1743
- Predecessor: Meñli II Giray
- Successor: Selim II Giray
- Born: 1691; Ottoman Empire
- Died: 1751 (aged 59–60); Ottoman Bulgaria
- Burial: Yambol, Ottoman Bulgaria
- Issue: Maqsud Giray
- Dynasty: Giray dynasty
- Father: Selim I Giray
- Religion: Sunni Islam

Selyamet II Giray (reigned 1740–1743, lived 1691–1751) was a khan of the Crimean Khanate. His four-year reign was relatively uneventful. He was described as honest, gentle, pious and inclined to charity and good works. He was the youngest son of Selim I Giray and thus the last of the six brothers who ruled for most of the period 1699–1743. His son Maqsud Giray became khan in 1767.

During the second reign of his brother Qaplan I Giray (1713-1715) he was Or-Beg or governor of Perekop. During the first reign of his brother Meñli II Giray (1724-1730) he started as nureddin and was promoted to kalga in 1727. During Mengli's second reign (1737-1740) he was kalga. When Mengli died of natural causes in January 1740 he was promoted to khan with the support of the Crimeans and approval of the Turks. He appointed as kalga Azamat Geray, a son of his brother Ğazı III Giray. As nureddin he appointed Tokhtamysh Giray, a son of his brother and predecessor Mengli Giray.

Just before he came to the throne Russia had invaded Crimea three times. (see Russo-Turkish War (1735–1739)) Selyamet's first task was to restore the Bakhchisaray Palace and associated mosques which the Russians had burned in 1736. In 1741 he went to Istanbul for consultations. In 1742 he replaced kalga Azamat with the future khan Selim II Giray, a son of his brother Qaplan. In foreign policy he had plans to resist Russia including a Swedish alliance (Russo-Swedish War (1741–1743)), but the Ottomans forbad this for fear of another Russian war. In October–November 1743 was dethroned by the Turks because of Russian complaints that he had not released some prisoners. Some writers say that Selim II and his friends in Istanbul had something to do with this.

After various moves he settled near Yambol. He died there in 1751 and was buried near the local mosque.

== Sources and notes ==
- Henry Hoyle Howorth, History of the Mongols, 1880, Part 2, p 581.
- Smirnov, Krimskoye Khanstvo b XVIII Beke, 1887, Chapter 4 https://www.krimoved-library.ru/books/krimskoe-hanstvo-v-xviii-veke4.html (in Russian)
- Giray-Ilmi: Rose Bush of Khans, compiled by Khalim Giray in 1811, modernized Turkish with many additions by Ablyakim Ilim (before 1947), Russian translation with additions and deletions of obsolete material by Kemal Usenov, 2004. https://www.vostlit.info/Texts/Dokumenty/Krym/XV/Rozovyj_kust_chanov/29.phtml?id=12949. (in Russian)
- Gaivoronsky: Short Biographies of Crimean Khans (in Russian) Гайворонский О. Созвездие Гераев. Краткие биографии крымских ханов. — Симферополь: Доля, 2003. — ISBN 966-8295-31-5

Preceded by Meñli II Giray	Khan of Crimea; 1740–1743	Succeeded by Selim II Giray
