= Selim III Giray =

- Khan

Khan of the Tatar Crimean Khanate (1st reign)
- Reign: 1765–1767
- Predecessor: Qırım Giray
- Successor: Arslan Giray

Khan of the Tatar Crimean Khanate (2nd reign)
- Reign: 1770–1771
- Predecessor: Qaplan II Giray
- Successor: Sahib II Giray
- Born: 1713
- Died: 1786 (aged 72–73); Vize, Ottoman Empire
- Dynasty: Giray dynasty
- Father: Fetih II Giray
- Religion: Islam

Selim III Giray (Note: Crimean Tatar, Ottoman Turkish and Persian: سلیم کرای ثالث.) (1713–1786) was a Crimean khan from the Giray dynasty (1765–1767, 1770–71), son of Khan Fetih II Giray and grandson of Devlet II Giray.

== Life ==
Under Arslan Giray (1748–1756) he held the post of kalgi. The reign of Selim III Geray brought about major changes in the life of the Crimean Khanate. Reigning for the first time, Selim III convinced the Ottoman Sultan of the need to conclude peace with Austria for a joint confrontation between Russia, but was soon deprived of the khan's rank.

In the first reign, Selim III Gerai appointed his brothers Mehmed Gerai and Kyrim Gerai as kalga and nureddin. In the second reign, Selim III appointed the kalga of his brother Mehmed Geray, and Nureddin - Kyrym Geray, the son of Khan Halim Geray.

By his repeated return to the throne, the Ottoman Empire had already entered the war with Russia and was unable to protect its possessions in the Northern Black Sea region. Local Nogais, seeing the military superiority of the Russians, came out of obedience to the khan and Turkey, having sided with Russia. The proposal to leave the Turkish vassalty came from St. Petersburg and the Crimea. Selim III Gerai refused the Russians and stopped all negotiations on this subject - and then in June 1771 the Russian army invaded the peninsula under the command of General-General-Chief Prince V. Dolgorukov. The Russian troops, having defeated the 70,000th army of the Crimean Khan, captured Perekop, and two weeks later, another 95,000th Tatar army was defeated in the battle of Kafa. Russian troops occupied the cities of Arabat, Kerch, Yenikale and Balaklava.

Among the Crimean Beys and even among the Khan's relatives, a pro-Russian party had already arisen by this time, and this, along with the unsuccessful Khan's command, led to the fact that the enemy occupied the country in the shortest possible time.

The Beysk assembly signed an alliance with Russia and decided from now on to elect the khan independently, which meant the country's exit from Ottoman rule and the independence of the khanate. Selim III Gerai initially obeyed the Beys' hope in the hope of a change in the situation, but soon, realizing his powerlessness to change something, abdicated and retired to Turkey.

Selim III Gerai was remembered as a brave man, at the same time reproaching him for inaction and indecision. He died in 1786 in the city of Wiese.
