= Qaplan II Giray =

Khan of the Tatar Crimean Khanate
- Reign: 1769–1770
- Predecessor: Devlet IV Giray
- Successor: Selim III Giray
- Born: 1739
- Died: 1771 (aged 31–32)
- Dynasty: Giray dynasty
- Religion: Islam

Qaplan II Giray (Note: Crimean Tatar, Ottoman Turkish and Persian: قپلان کرای ثانی.) (1739–1771) was a Crimean khan of the late 18th century.

== Biography ==
Qaplan ruled from 1769 to 1770, a very brief reign. During his time as khan of the Crimean Khanate, he negotiated with the Russian Empire for Crimean independence. Qaplan fought against Russia in the Russo-Turkish War for his entire reign, and died in 1771.
