= Bahadır II Giray =

Khan of Crimea in 1782

Bahadir II Gerai (Note: Crimean Tatar, Ottoman Turkish and Persian: بهادر کرای ثانی) (1722–1791) was Khan of Crimea. He came to power during the uprising of 1782. He was the eldest son of Akhmed Geray (d. 1750) and the grandson of Crimean Khan Devlet II Giray.

== Life ==
In 1777, Prince Bahadir Gerai became the leader of the Abaza people. In 1781, he was appointed and approved by his brother, the Crimean Khan Şahin Giray, serasker of the Edichkul horde. Ruling since 1777, Khan Shahin Gerai carried out pro-Russian radical reforms in Crimea, in particular, equalizing Muslim and non-Muslim populations. Reforms were extremely unpopular, and in 1781 led to an uprising that began in the Kuban and quickly spread to the Crimea. By July 1782, an uprising completely swept the entire peninsula, the khan was forced to flee, and his administration officials, who had not managed to escape, were killed. At the center of the uprising were the brothers Shakhin, princes Bahadir Gerai and Arslan Gerai. Bahadir Gerai was elected khan and is considered the last independent Crimean khan, since the short reign of Shakhin after him was a puppet character. Bahadir Gerai appointed his younger brother Arslan Gerai as a kalga-sultan.

The new Crimean government applied for recognition to the Ottoman and Russian empires. The first refused to recognize the new khan, and the second sent troops to crush the uprising. The troops were commanded in the Crimea by Anton Bogdanovich Balmen, and in the Kuban by Alexander Vasilievich Suvorov. By November 1782, the uprising was completely crushed, most of Bahadir's supporters through the North Caucasus went to Turkey, and Bahadir himself was captured and was imprisoned in Kherson. In 1783, he managed to escape to the Caucasus, and since 1789 he lived in Turkey. He died in Turkey on his estate in 1791 near Istanbul.

== Sources ==
- Gaivoronsky Alex. Constellation Geraev. - Simferopol, 2003
- Vladimir Gutakov, “Russian Way to the South”
