= Devlet =

Devlet is the Turkish word for "state", a borrowing from Arabic dawla (دولة) via Persian dowlat (دولت). It has also been used as a given name. It may refer to:

- Devlet Bahçeli (born 1948), Turkish politician and chairman of the far-right Nationalist Movement Party
- Devlet Ana (died 1267), grandmother of Ottoman Sultan Osman I
- Devlet Hatun (1370-1411), consort of Ottoman Sultan Bayezid I and the mother of Sultan Mehmed I
- Devletşah Hatun (1365-1414), consort of Ottoman Sultan Bayezid I
- Devlet Giray (disambiguation), four Crimean khans
