= Giray =

Giray may refer to:

== Given name ==
- Giray Bulak (born 1958), Turkish football coach
- Giray Kaçar (born 1985), Turkish footballer

== Surname ==
- Safa Giray (1931–2011), Turkish politician and government minister

== Crimean dynasty ==
‘Giray’ was used as a surname by all male members of the Crimean ruling house.

Every ruler of the Crimean Khanate had the surname “Giray” except for Nur Devlet and possibly Hayder of Crimea. See

- Giray dynasty
- List of Crimean khans

== See also ==
- Giray (disambiguation)
