= Devlet III Giray =

Crimean Khan from 1716 to 1717

Delvet III Giray

Khan of the Tatar Crimean Khanate
- Reign: 1716 – 1717
- Predecessor: Qaplan I Giray
- Successor: Saadet IV Giray
- Born: 1647
- Died: 1717 (aged 70); Somewhere in modern day Bulgaria
- Dynasty: Giray dynasty
- Religion: Sunni Islam

Devlet III Giray (Note: Crimean Tatar, Ottoman Turkish and Persian: دولت کرای ثالث) (1647 – 1717) was the Khan of the Crimean Khanate from 1716 to 1717. He died in 1717 somewhere in modern-day Bulgaria after falling from his horse, having been removed from power by the Ottoman Sultan Ahmed III earlier that year.
