= Qırım Giray =

Khan of the Tatar Crimean Khanate (1st reign)
- Reign: 1758–1764
- Predecessor: Halim Giray
- Successor: Selim III Giray

Khan of the Tatar Crimean Khanate (2nd reign)
- Reign: 1768–1769
- Predecessor: Maqsud Giray
- Successor: Devlet IV Giray
- Born: 1717; Bağçasaray, Crimean Khanate
- Died: March 1769 (aged 51–52)
- Dynasty: Giray dynasty
- Religion: Islam

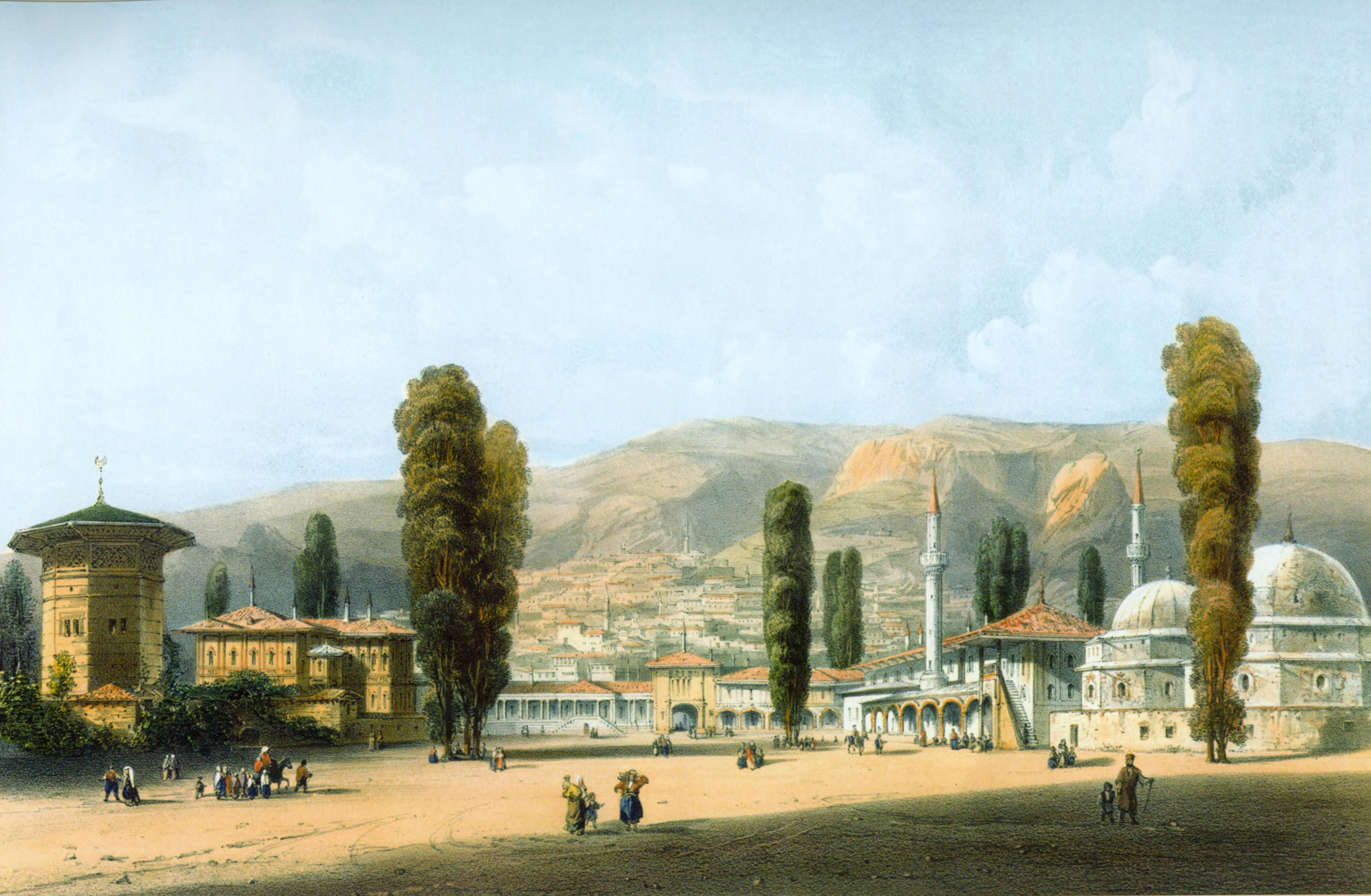
Khan Qırım Girai, is known to have authorized the construction of many landmarks in Bakhchysarai and the Crimean Khanate.

Khan Qırım Giray (Note: Crimean Tatar, Ottoman Turkish and Persian: خان قریم کرای) (1717–1769) was one of the most influential rulers of the Crimean Khanate. He was the patron of the Bakhchisaray Fountain and many Mosques throughout Crimea, and is also known to have extended the Bakhchisaray Palace.

== Reign ==
Qırım Giray's first reign lasted (1758–1764), he gathered a large army in Căușeni and prepared to invade Poland after some Tatar merchants were robbed, some of his forces managed to raid and pillage a few important Polish strongholds. Poland agreed to pay indemnity to him and the conflict ended.

Qırım Giray intended to wage war against Stanisław August Poniatowski, who was placed as ruler of Poland by Catherine II but was halted by the Ottoman Empire and was deposed by his nephew Selim III Giray, but regained power after the reign of Maqsud Giray.

Qırım Giray's second reign lasted from (1768–1769), he once again gathered a large army in Căușeni consisting of Tatars, Ottomans and Polish allies and invaded the Russian held territories in modern-day Ukraine.

== Family and descendants ==
Qırım Giray had a harem of 48 women. His favorite consort was Dilara Bikech, a Christian-born concubine often identified in romantic tradition and legend with the Polish noblewoman Maria Potocka, in whose memory the Khan commissioned the famous Fountain of Tears in 1764. The Khan left behind four sons: Baht Giray, Bahadır Giray, Muhammed Giray, and Kaplan Giray. Following Qırım Giray's death in 1769, Baht Giray was appointed Kalga (first heir apparent) and Muhammed Giray became Nureddin (second heir apparent), though none of his sons ever ascended the Crimean throne. Kaplan Giray relocated with his family to the Ottoman Empire after 1769, settling in Karahalil near Babaeski (in modern-day Kırklareli Province, Turkey). One of his descendants, Aslan Giray Sultan Efendi, served as the mayor of Babaeski from 1922 to 1926.

== Bakhchisaray Fountain ==
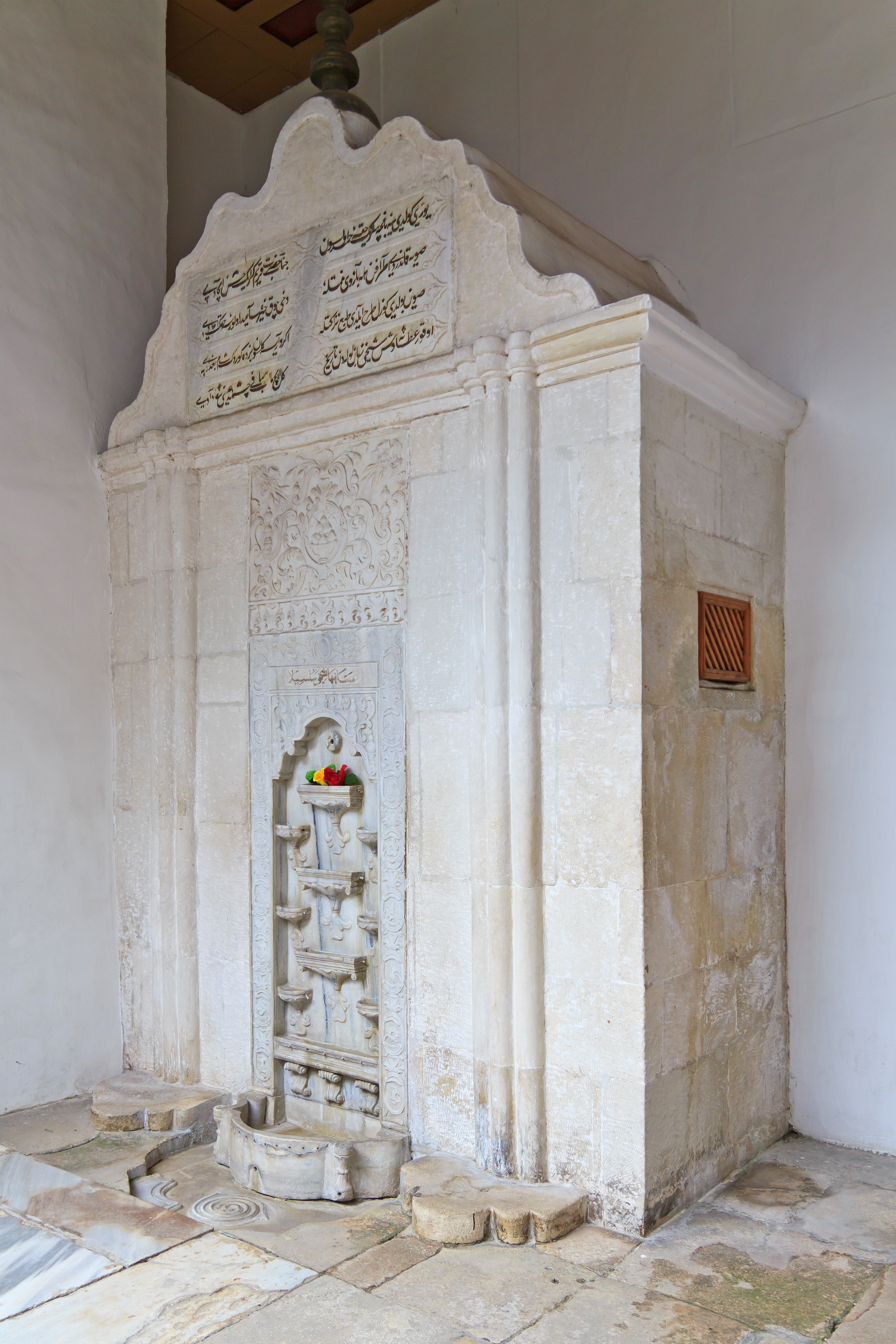
Fountain of Tears

In 1764 Khan Qırım Girai commissioned the fountain master Omer the Persian to construct the Bakhchisaray Fountain. The Bakhchisaray Fountain or Fountain of Tears is a real case of life imitating art. The fountain is known as the embodiment of love of one of the last Crimean Khans, Khan Qırım Girai for his young wife, and his grief after her early death. The Khan was said to have fallen in love with this Polish girl in his harem named Maria Potoçka. Despite his battle-hardened harshness, he was grievous and wept when she died, astonishing all those who knew him. He commissioned a marble fountain to be made, so that the rock would weep, like him, forever.

The tradition of building such Salsabil fountain is well established in Islamic architecture, especially in the cities of Baghdad and Damascus. Salsabil fountains often involved several basins, and sometimes channels that distributed water through basins and pools.

Inscribed in gold above the Fountain of Tears is a verse of Surah 76 of the Quran, which names, among the benefits the righteous will enjoy including a spring, called "Salsabil". According to many Muslim scholars, the word Salsabil literally means "seek the way". It refers to a particular spring in heaven, and it also contains allusions to such concepts as "nectar," "smooth" and "easy on the throat". The Arabic word Sabil commonly refers to public fountains built for philanthropic purposes to provide water for wayfarers.

== Death ==
Qırım Giray died abruptly in March 1769 in Căușeni, Moldavia, shortly after finishing a winter campaign during the Russo-Turkish War. While officially attributed to declining health, contemporary accounts—including those of French advisor François Baron de Tott—suggest he was poisoned by a Greek physician named Siropoulos, who fled immediately after the Khan's death. The sudden loss removed a key military commander for the Ottoman Empire and led to his nephew, Devlet IV Giray, ascending the Crimean throne.

== See also ==
- Crimean Khanate
