= Garayev =

Garayev or Garaev (Russian: Гараев) is a masculine surname common among Azeris, Volga Tatars, Turkmens, Bashkirs; its feminine form is Garayeva or Garaeva. The surname may refer to:

- Abulfaz Garayev (born 1956), Azerbaijani politician
- Aliheydar Garayev (1896–1938), Soviet revolutionary
- Aliya Garayeva (born 1988), Russian rhythmic gymnast
- Faig Garayev (born 1959), Azerbaijani volleyball coach and former player
- Faraj Garayev (born 1943), Azerbaijani music composer and teacher, son of Gara
- Gara Garayev (1918–1982), Azerbaijani classical composer
- Gara Garayev (footballer) (born 1992), Azerbaijani football midfielder
- Marat Garaev (born 1990), Russian football player
- Vusal Garaev (born 1986), Azerbaijan U-21 player
- Yuliya Garayeva (born 1968), Russian fencer

== See also ==
- Gareyev
