= Bakhchysarai Palace =

Former residence of the Crimean Khans

The Khan's Palace in Bakhchysarai
- Han Saray (Crimean Tatar)
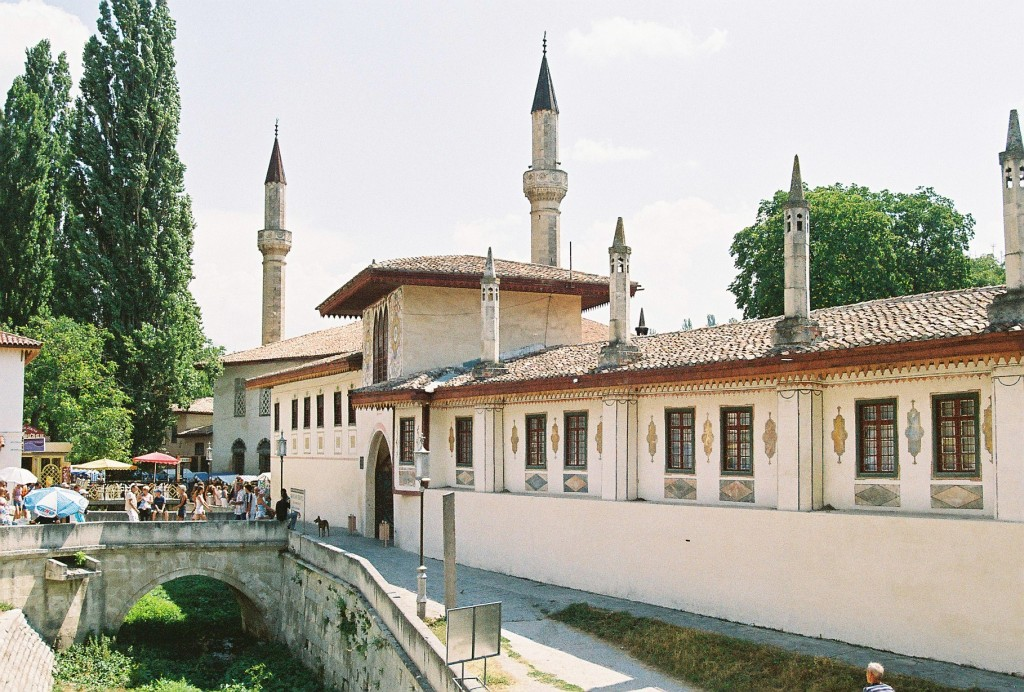
- Bakhchysarai Palace
- Interactive map of The Khan's Palace in Bakhchysarai
- 44°44′55.22″N 33°52′55.06″E
- Location: Bakhchysarai, Crimea

History
- Built: 1532

Site notes
- Architectural style: Ottoman architecture
- Website: http://handvorec.ru/

Immovable Monument of National Significance of Ukraine
- Official name: Комплекс Ханського палацу (Complex of the Khan's Palace)
- Type: Architecture
- Reference no.: 010077

The Khan's Palace (Crimean Tatar: Hansaray; Turkish: Han Sarayı) is located in the town of Bakhchysarai, Crimea. It was built in the 16th century and became home to a succession of Crimean Khans. The walled enclosure contains a mosque, a harem, a cemetery, living quarters and gardens. The palace interior has been decorated to appear lived in and reflects the traditional 16th-century Crimean Tatar style. It is one of the best known Muslim palaces found in Europe, alongside the Sultan palaces of Istanbul and the Alhambra in Spain.

In December 2022, Russian forces dismantled a damaged roof and an ensemble of colored stained glass windows in the palace and replaced it with modern ones in order to prevent possible damage during fighting. The move has been described by the Ukrainian side as part of an "ongoing assault" on cultural heritage.

== History ==
The city of Bakhchysarai and the palace were commissioned by the Crimean Khan dynasty, who moved their capital here from Salaçıq in the first half of the 16th century. The palace's complex design and minarets were constructed in the 16th century by Ottoman, Persian and Italian architects. Later damages required partial reconstruction, but the structure still has a resemblance to its original form. Some buildings currently in the palace were attached later, while some of the original buildings could not stand past the 18th century.

In 2017, the palace was subject to restoration, which was conducted by Moscow-based Atta Group, a firm with little experience in historical preservation. As part of the process, the palace's centuries-old oak beams were removed and replaced with concrete, original tiles were removed, while its 18th century murals were damaged by a high-pressure water stream. Many stained glass windows, the four-sided roof, and the original spoon-shaped artisanal tiles (tartar) were also lost. In addition, cracks appeared on the facade of the building and plaster fell off during pressure cleaning. In response to the alleged damages, the Ministry of Foreign Affairs of Ukraine sent a protest notice to UNESCO, which manages the World Heritage Sites, since the Bakhchysarai Place was added to the organization's Tentative List of World Heritage Sites in 2003.

== Bakhchysarai Fountain ==
One courtyard contains a small fountain whose sad story so moved the Russian writer Alexander Pushkin when he visited it that he wrote a long narrative poem titled "The Fountain of Bakhchisaray".

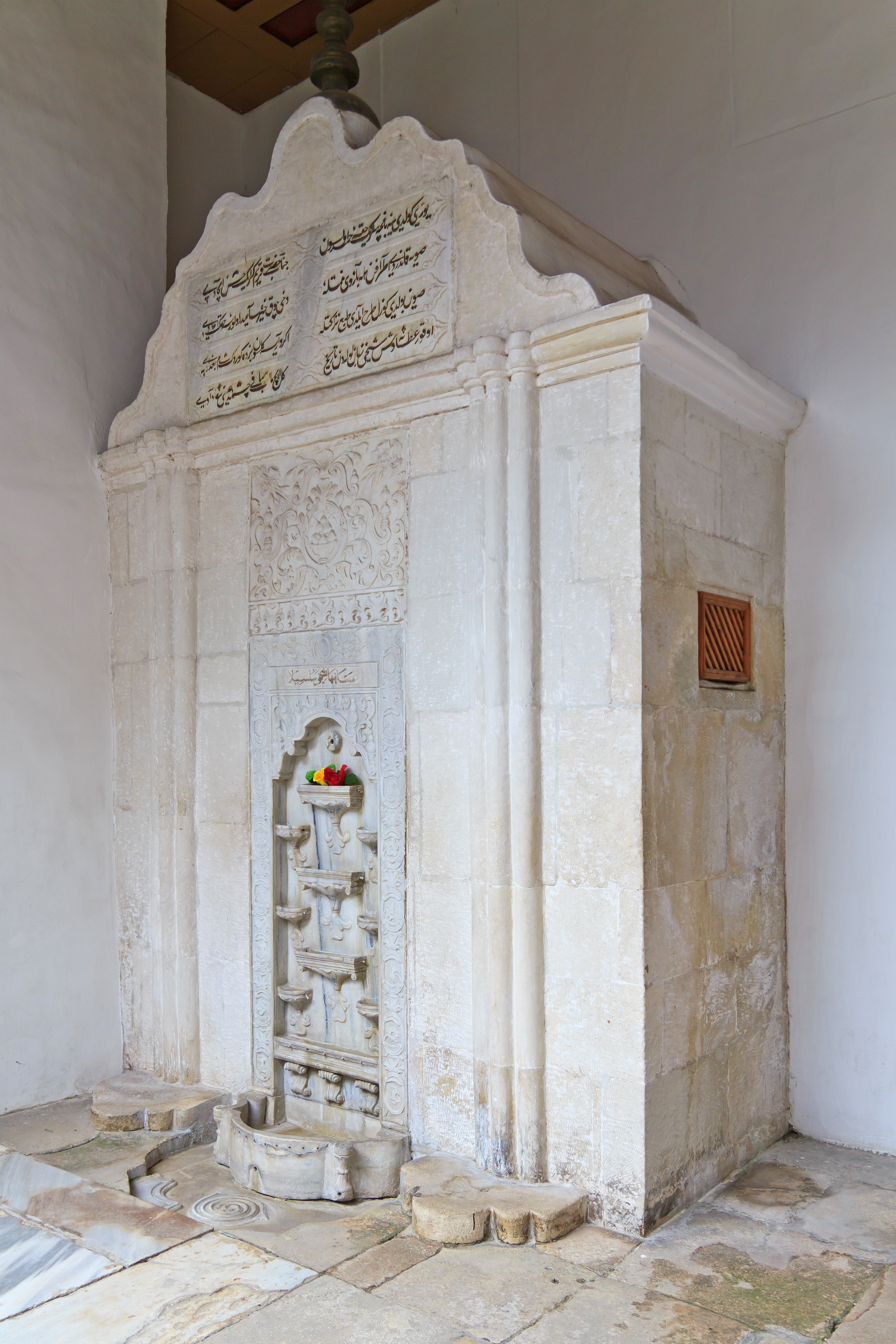
Fountain of Tears

The fountain is known as the embodiment of love of one of the last Crimean Khans, Qırım Giray Khan, for his young wife, and his grief after her early death. The Khan was said to have fallen in love with a Polish girl in his harem named Maria. Maria is presumed to have been slain by the Khan's former favourite wife Zarema, a Georgian, who had been supplanted in his affections by Maria. Despite his battle-hardened harshness, he is said to have grieved and wept when Maria died, astonishing all those who knew him. He commissioned a marble fountain to be made, so that the rock would weep, like him, forever.

Originally placed by the young woman's tomb in a restful garden, the fountain was transferred to its current location in the Ambassadors' courtyard after Catherine II ordered the annexation of the Crimean territory. Pushkin's verses are credited in part for ensuring the survival of the palace itself to date.

== The Big Khan Mosque ==
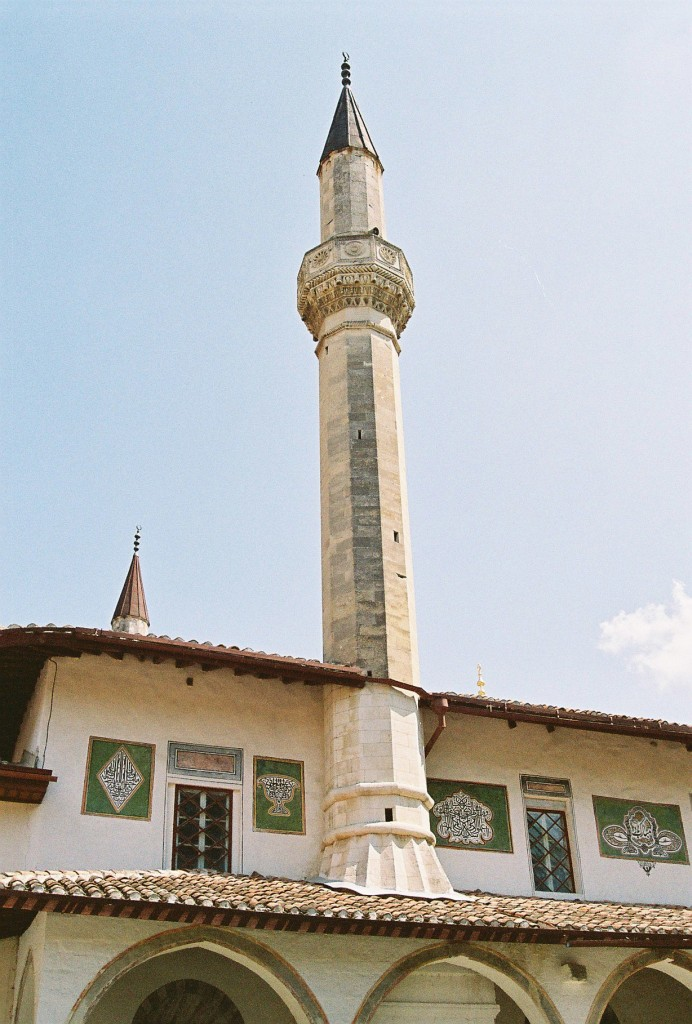
Minaret

The Big Khan Mosque (Crimean Tatar: Büyük Han Cami) is located on the Palace Square to the east of the northern gate. It is one of the largest mosques in the Crimea and one of the first buildings of the Khan's palace. The mosque was built in 1532 by Sahib I Giray and bore his name in the 17th century.

The mosque consists of a three-aisle square prayer hall covered with a hipped roof, a narthex and porticos facing east and west. Two symmetrical octagonal minarets rise through the porticos; they are twenty-eight meters high and have conical caps and finials. A domed ablution kiosk of square shape is attached to the northeastern corner of the mosque. It is believed that a madrasah built by Khan Arslan Giray in 1750 used to adjoin the eastern wall. The mosque is entered from a portal facing north. Inside, a balcony is attached to three of the four walls, part of which is sectioned off for the Khan's lodge. Scholars argue that the mosque was originally roofed with domes of various sizes.

In 1736 the mosque was damaged by fire during the Russo-Turkish War (1735–1739) and later restored during the reign of Khan Selâmet II Giray (1740–1743).

== Small Khan Mosque ==
The Small Khan Mosque (Crimean Tatar: Kiçik Han Cami) is located in the main building and was designed for members of the Khan's family and important dignitaries. Construction of the small mosque dates back to the 16th century, and paintings in the mosque are from the 17th and 18th centuries

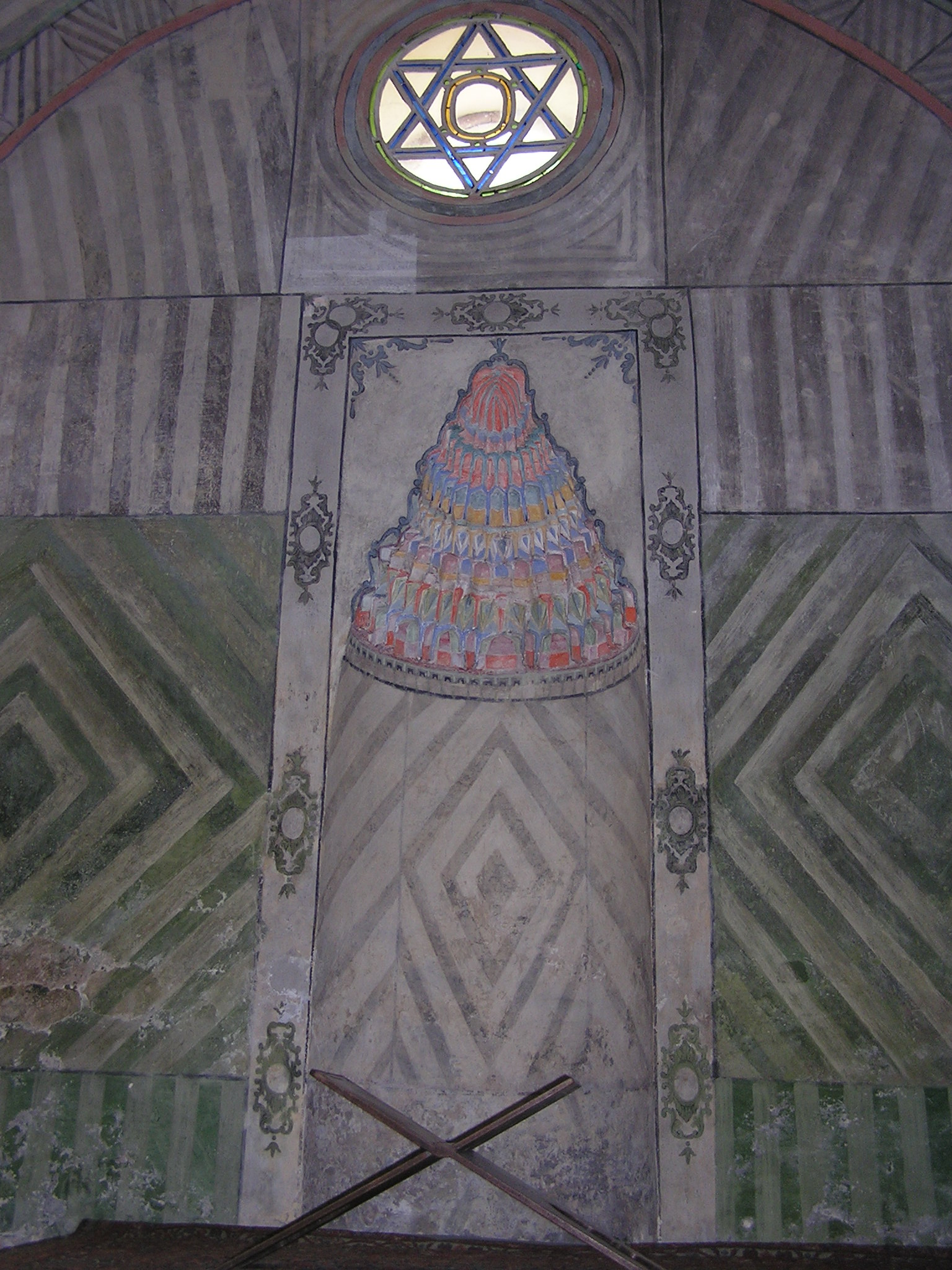
Mihrab in the Small Mosque

In the south wall is the mihrab, the upper part of which is cut seven ornamented belts, symbolizing the seven levels of heaven. Above the mihrab is a stained glass window, which shows the seal of Suleiman (hexagram). On the walls of the small mosque are scratched images of boats with sails, horses and horsemen.

== Galleries ==
Exterior views and diagrams

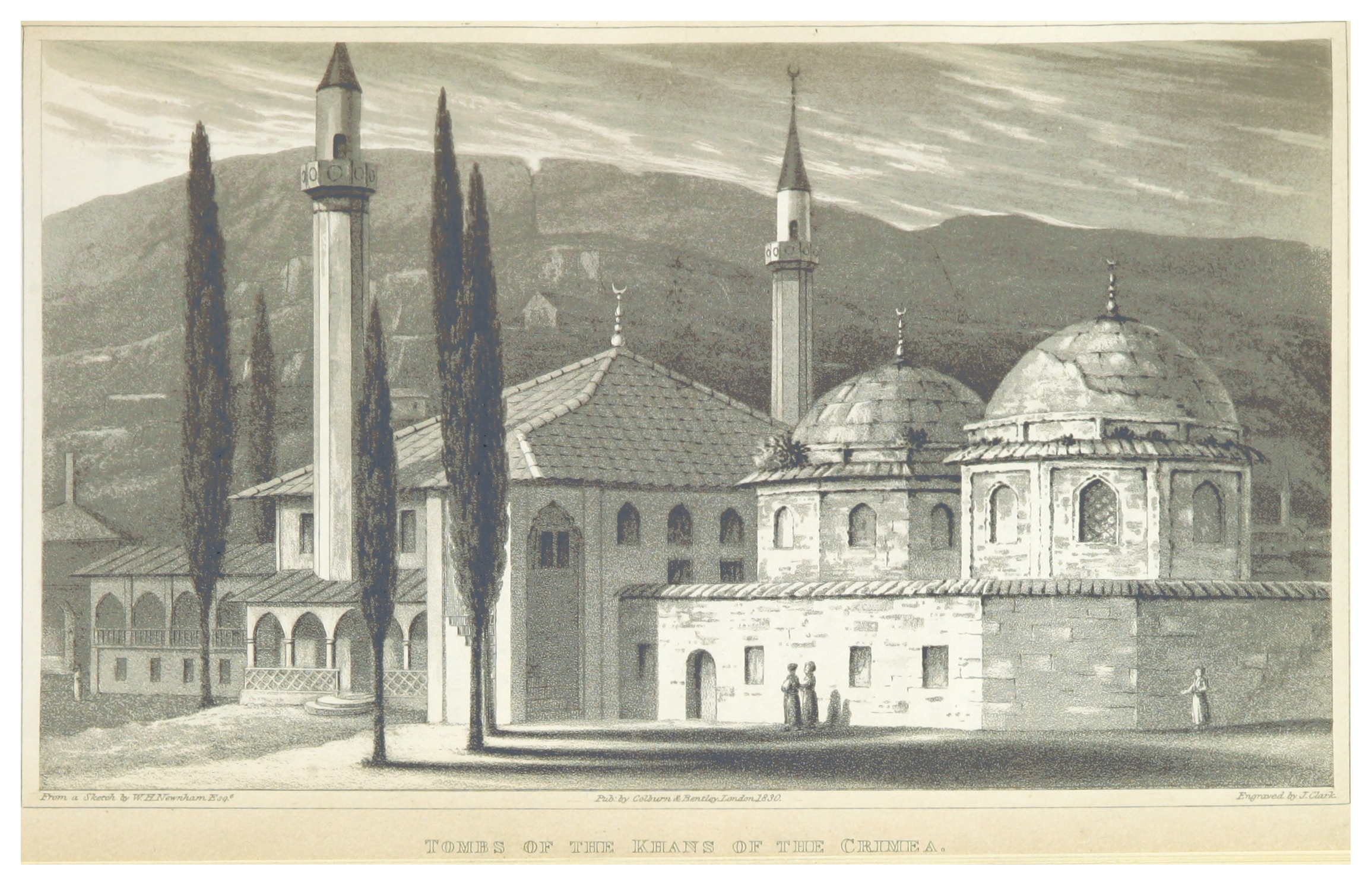
The palace in 1830

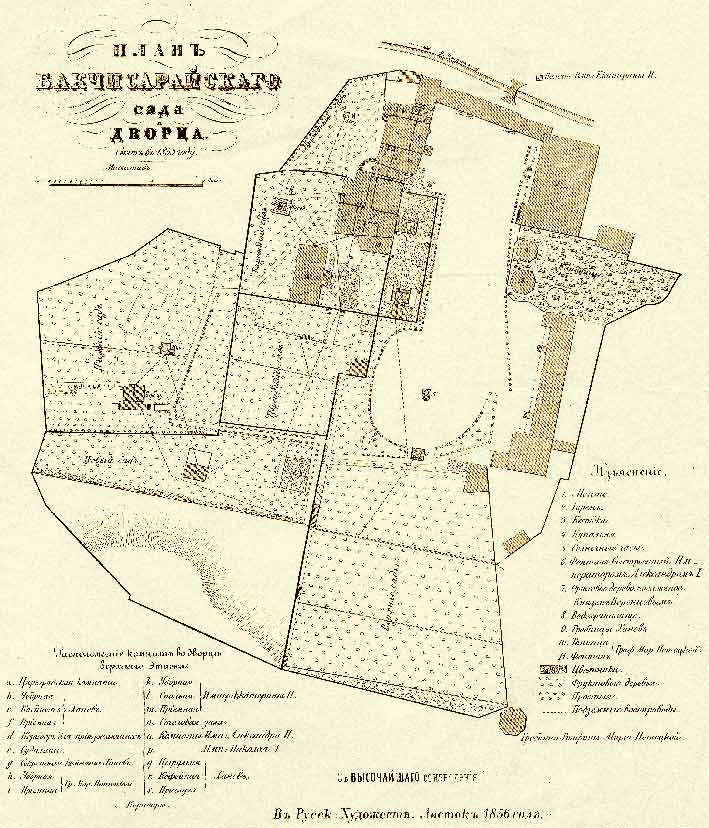
Map of the Bakhchysarai garden and palace, 1855

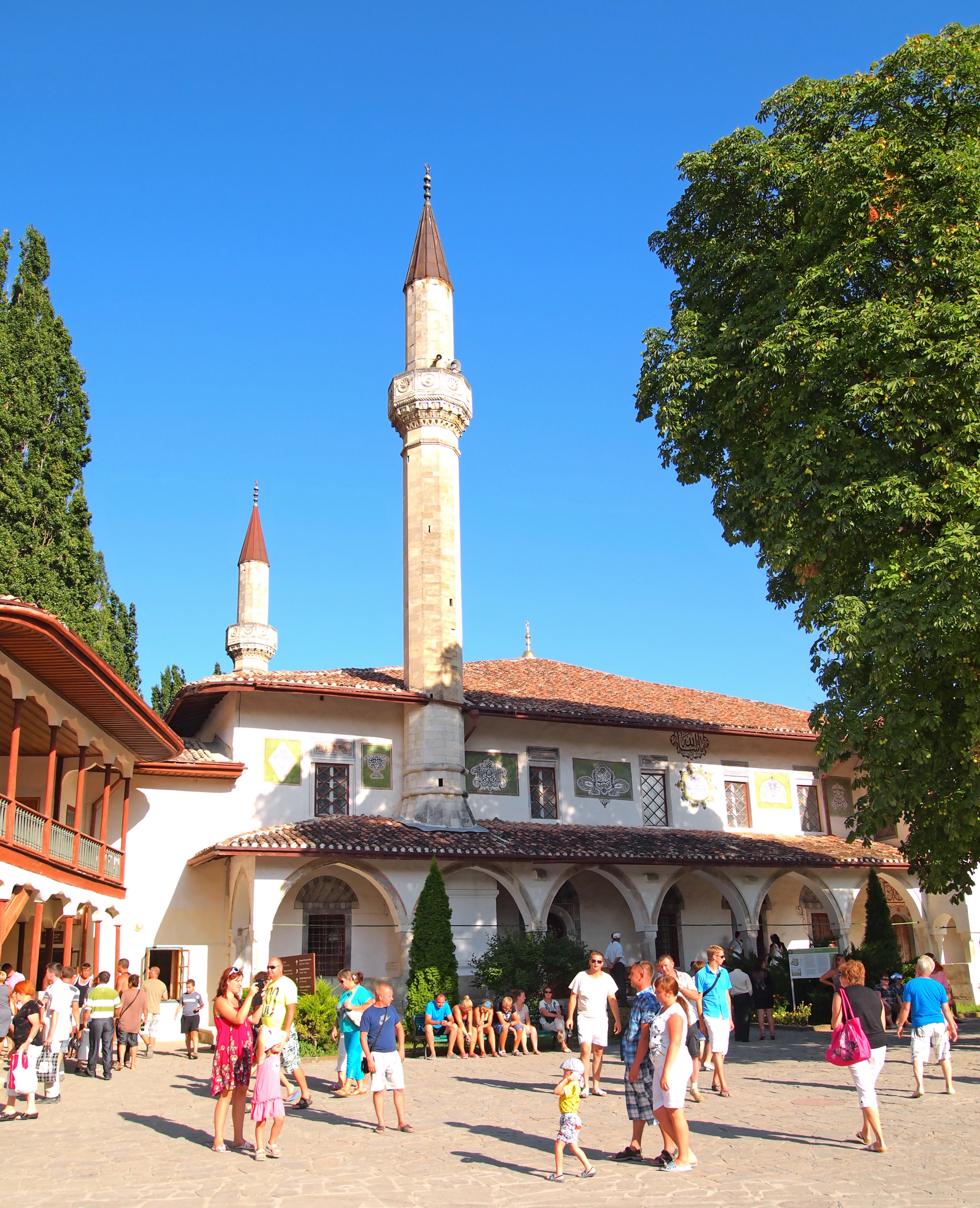
Big mosque of the palace

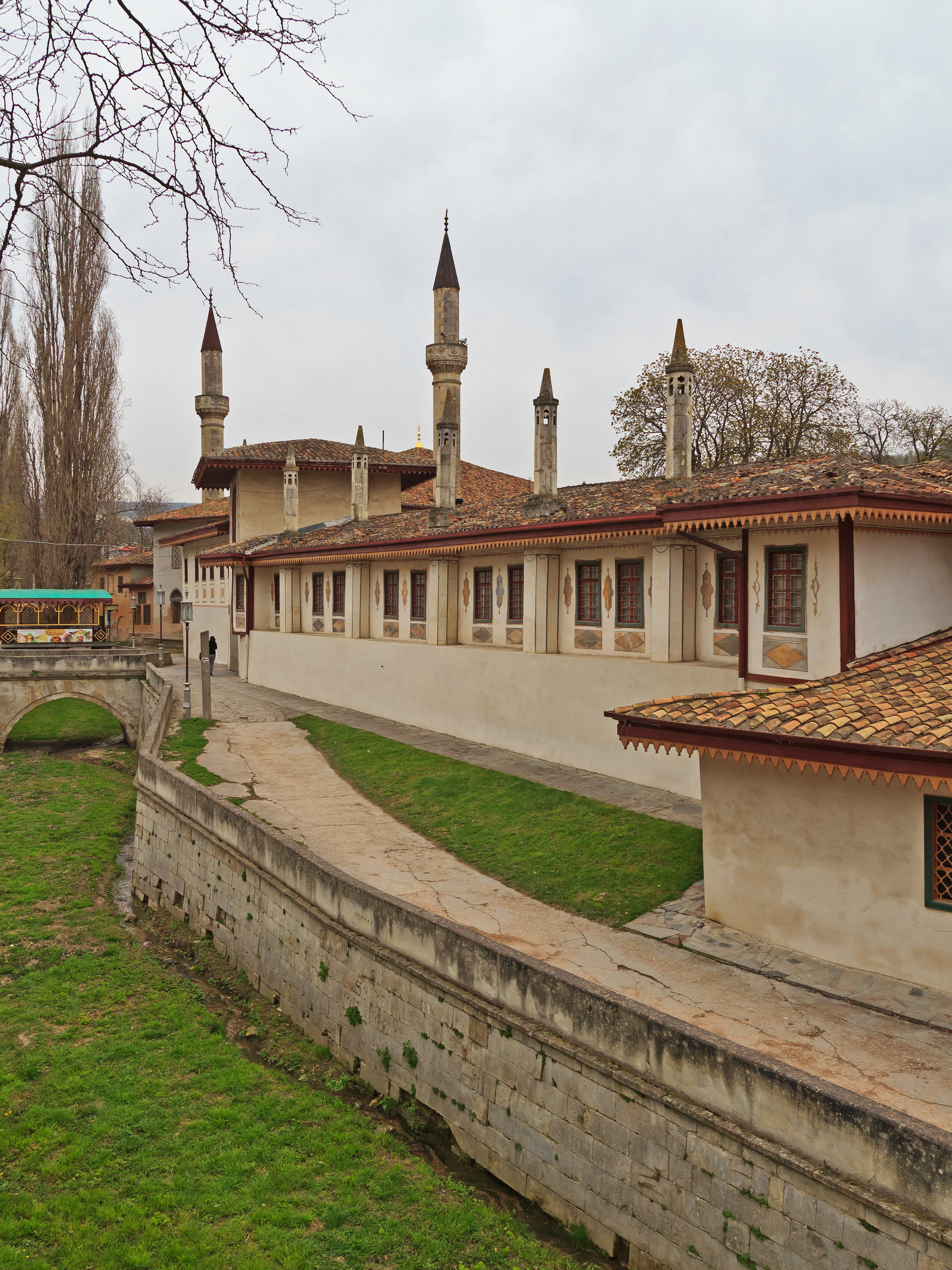
Bakhchysarai Palace

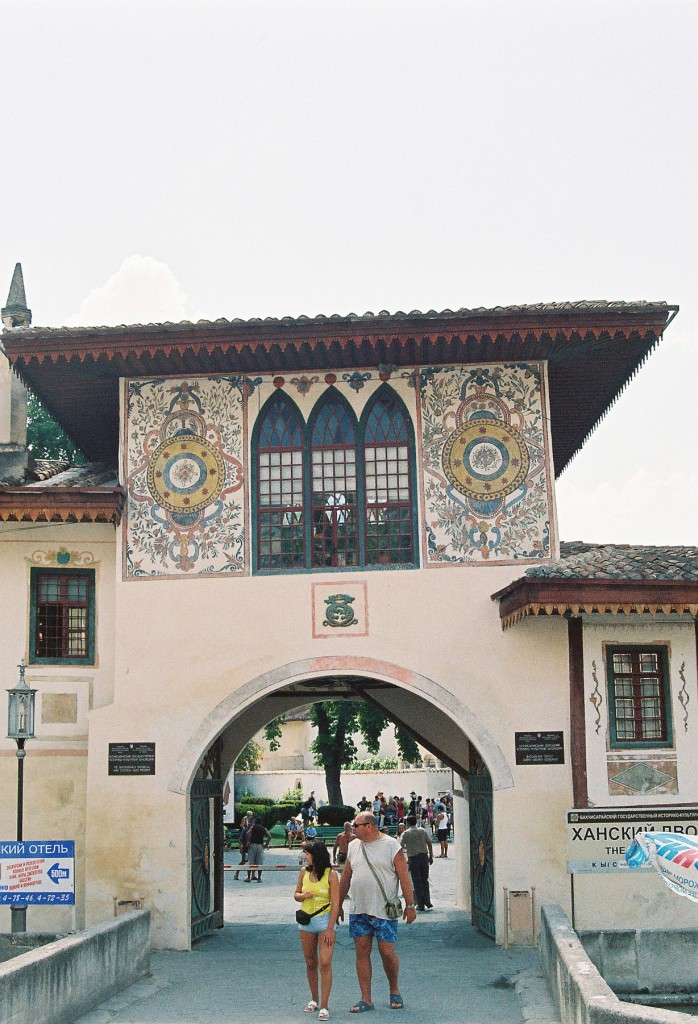
Northern gate

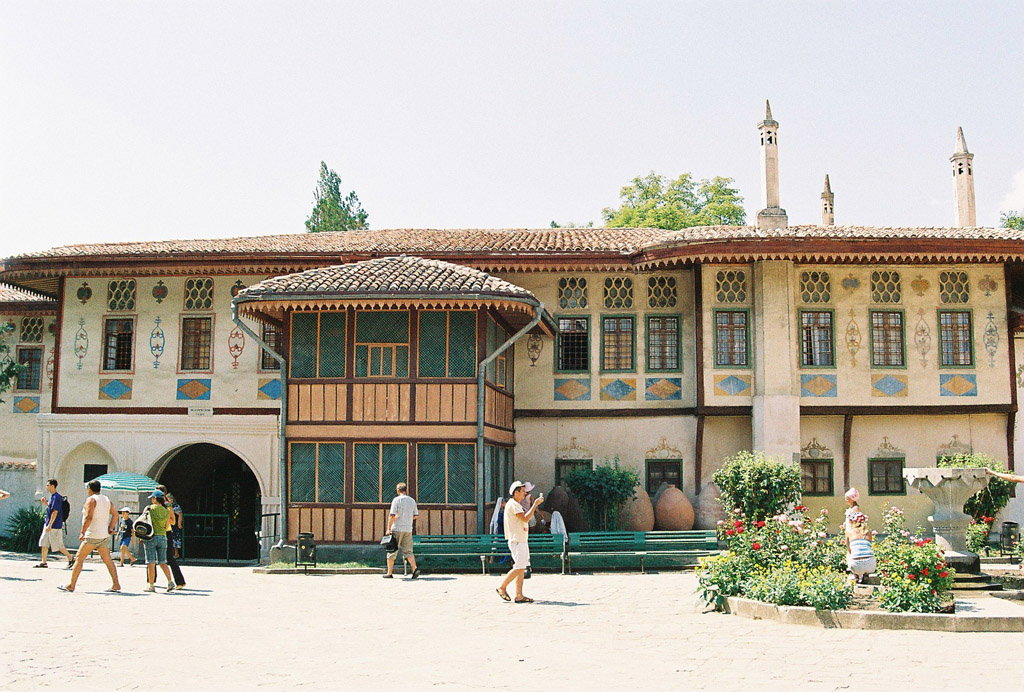
Living quarters

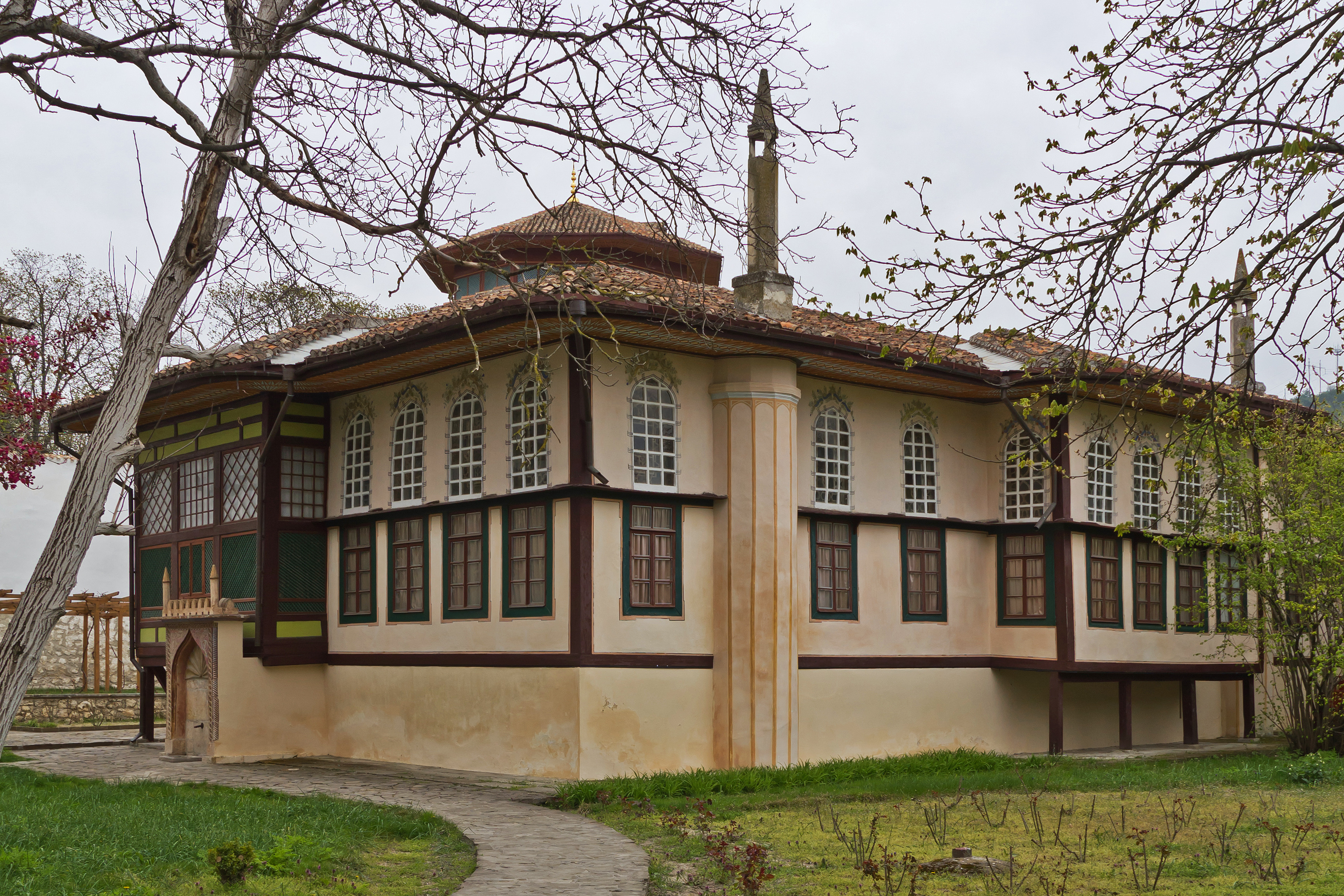
Harem building

Interior

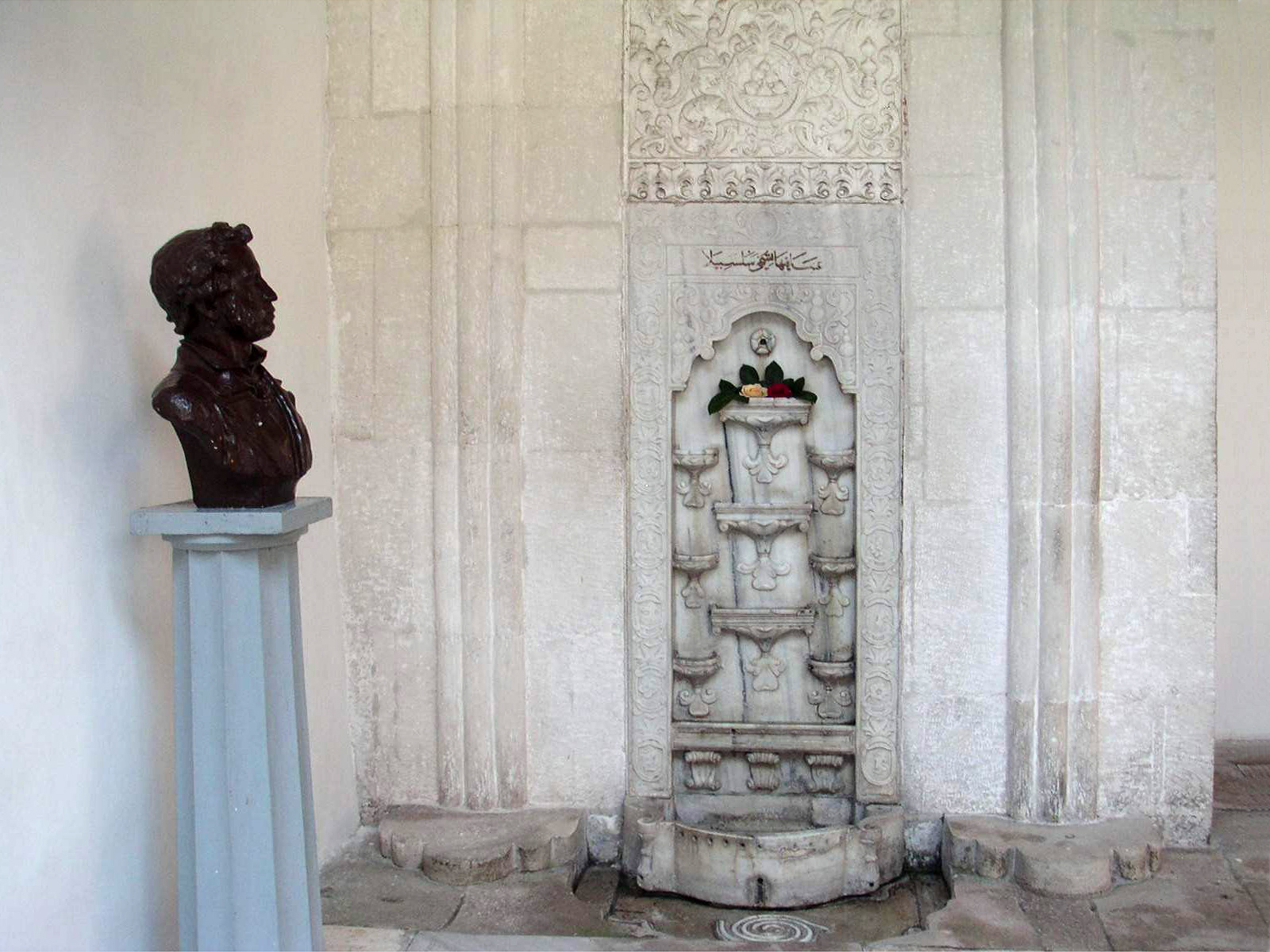
Fountain of Tears

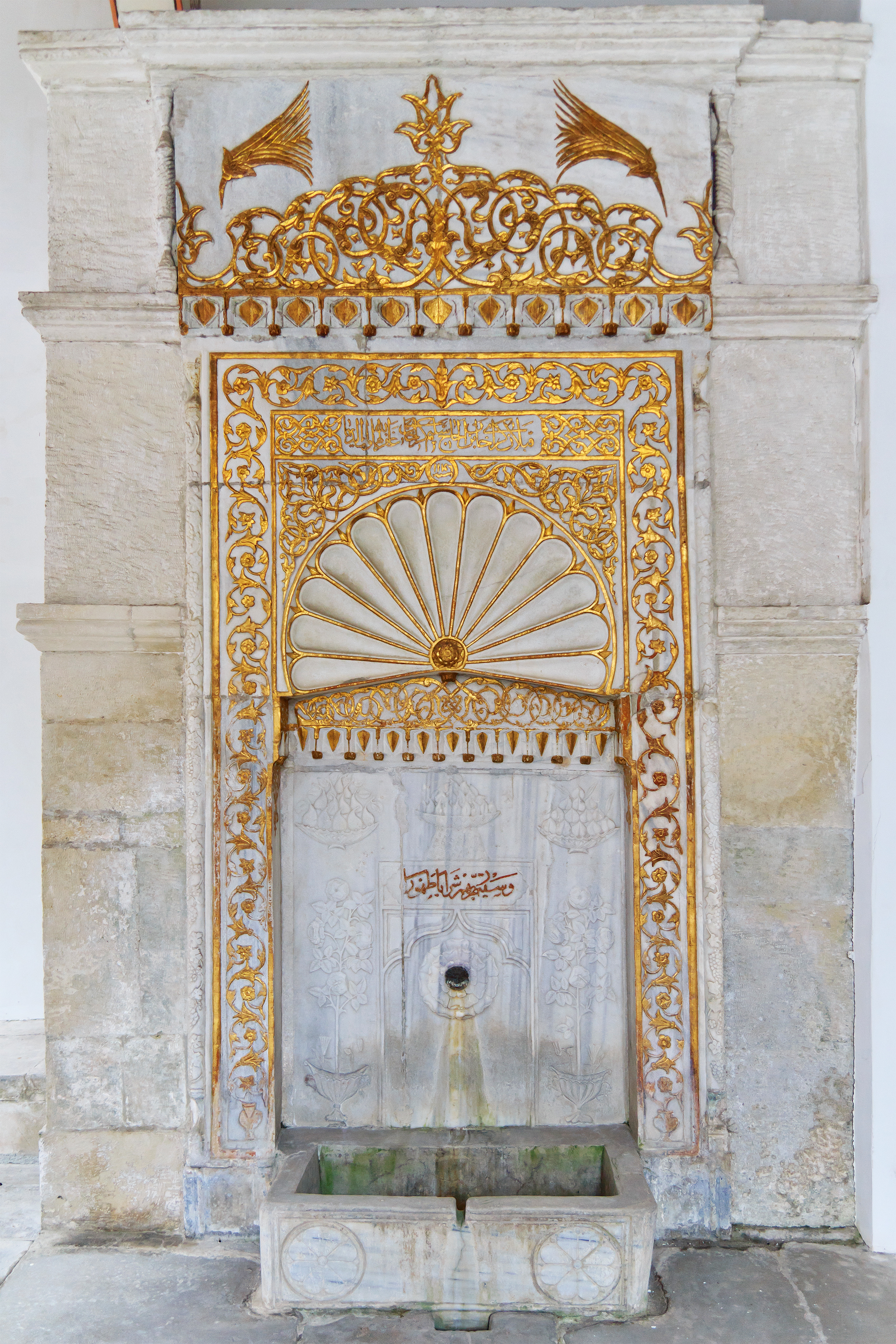
Golden Fountain

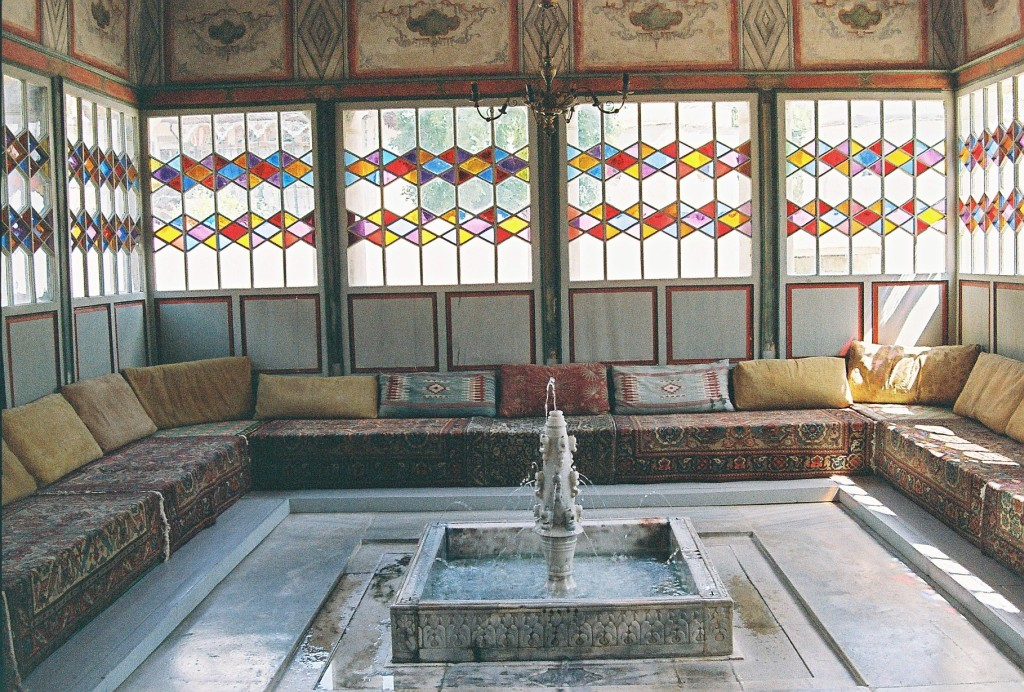
Summer Pavilion

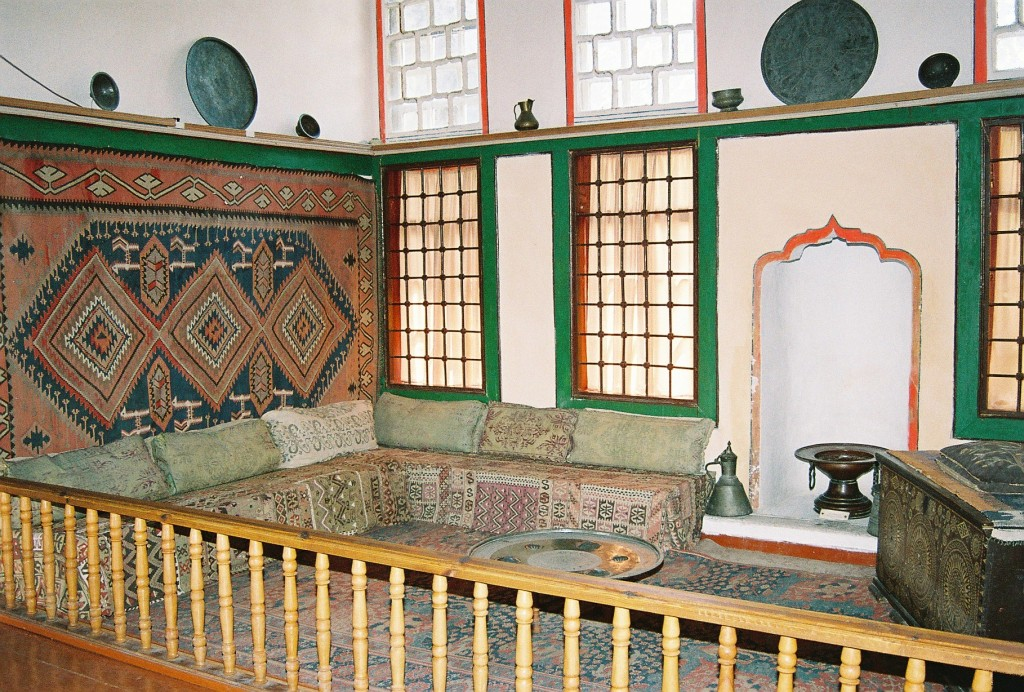
Interior of the harem

In art

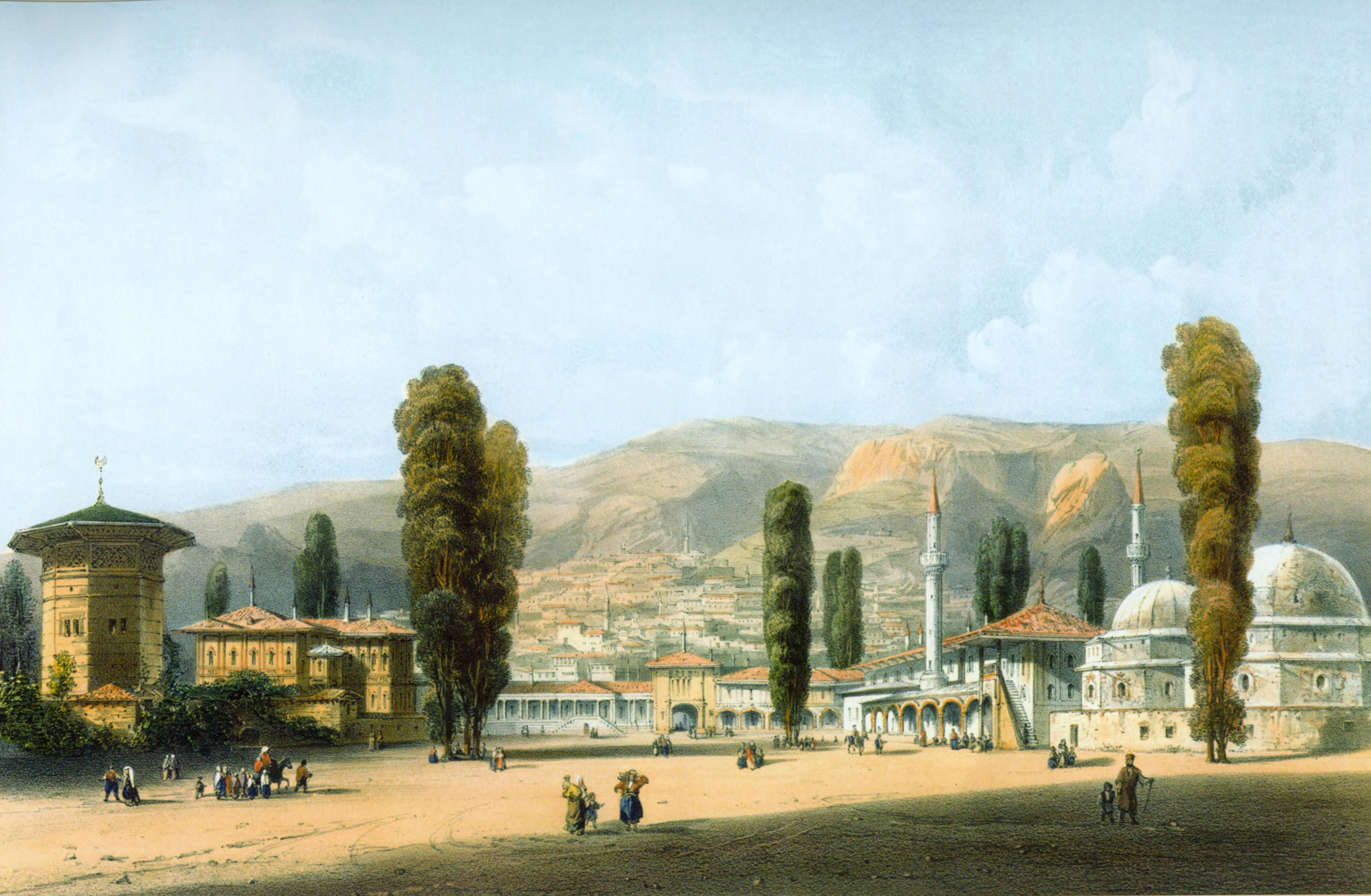
Khan's Palace, by Carlo Bossoli (1840–1842)

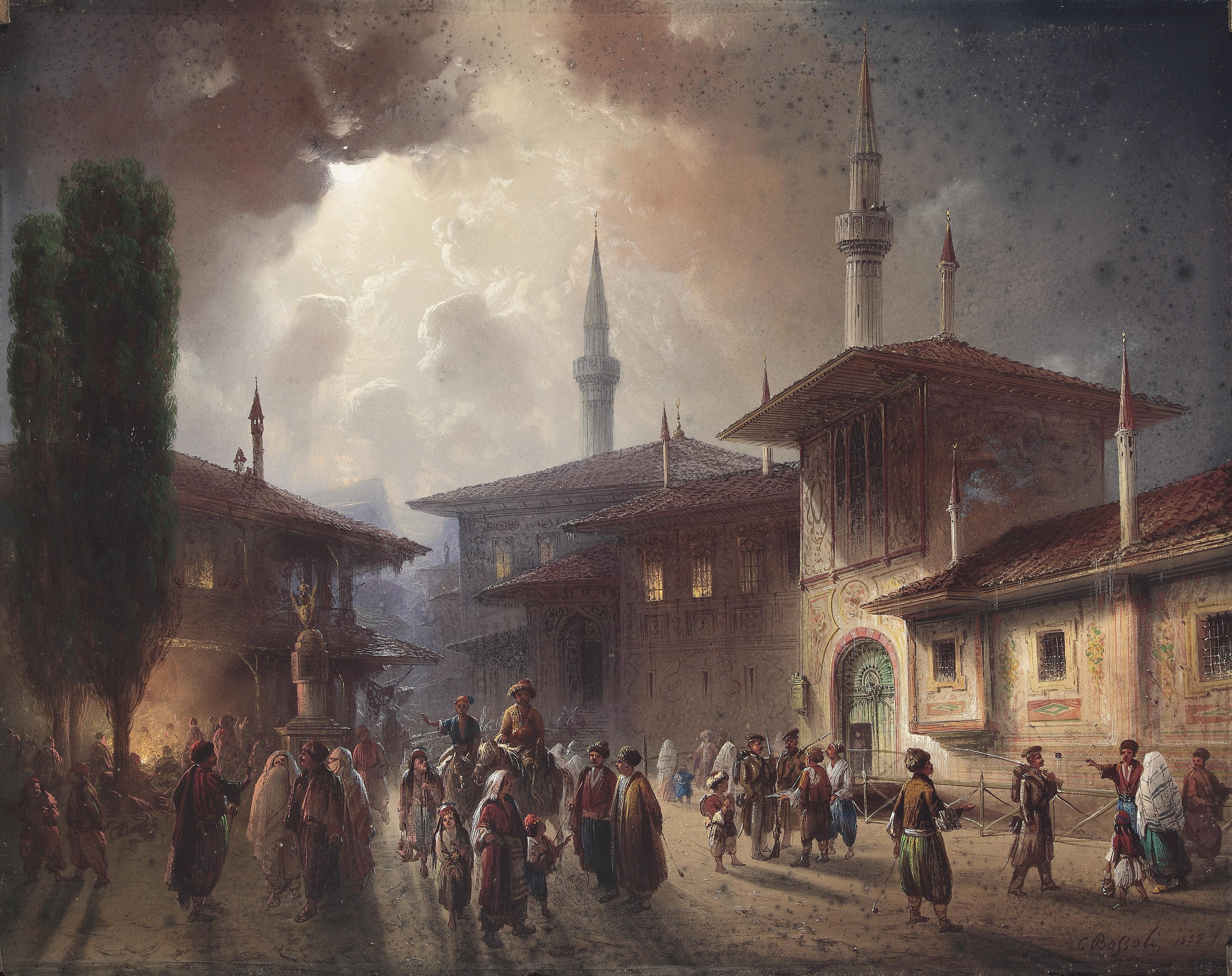
Khan's Palace, by Carlo Bossoli (1857)

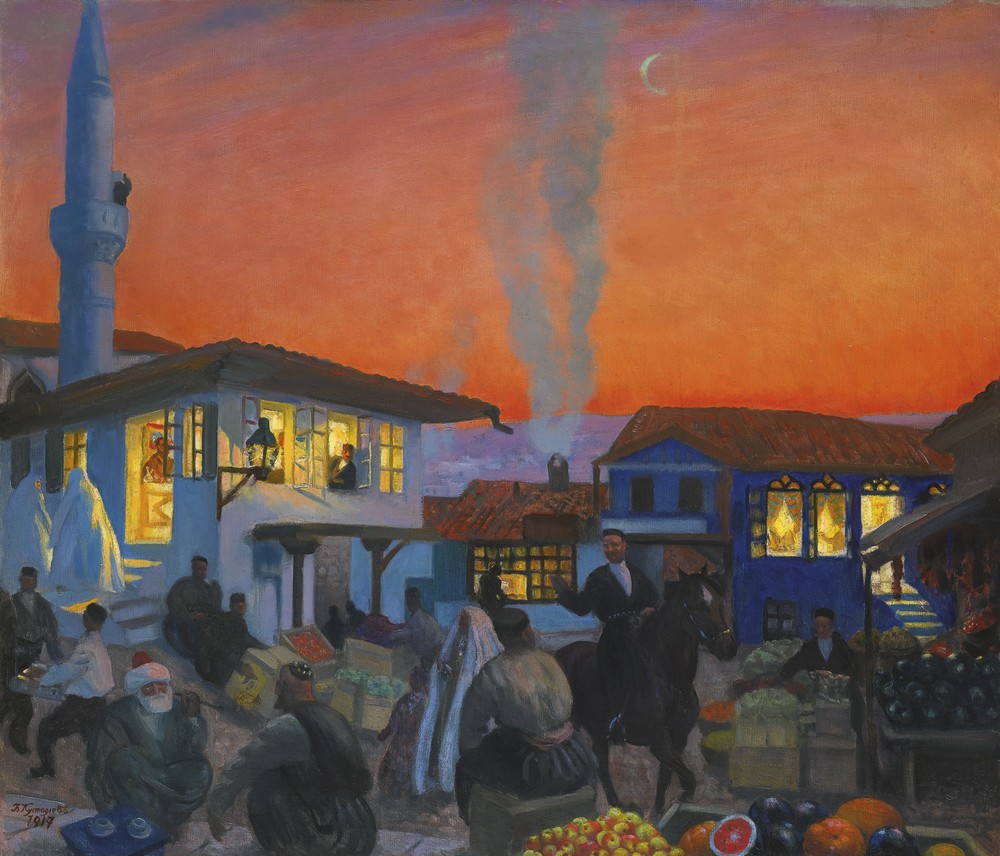
Bakhchysarai, by Boris Kustodiev (1917)

== See also ==
- Islam in Ukraine
- Crimean Khanate
