= Sahib II Giray =

Khan of Crimea from 1771 to 1775

Khan of the Tatar Crimean Khanate
- Reign: November 1771 – Spring 1775
- Predecessor: Selim III Giray
- Successor: Devlet IV Giray
- Born: 1726
- Died: 1807 (aged 80–81); Çatalca, Ottoman Empire

Sahib II Giray (1726 – 1807) was the Khan of Crimea from November 1771 to spring of 1775, when he was overthrown. He was often described as being "an accomplished but quiet man".

== Reign ==
Sahib II Giray became Khan in November 1771, following the abdication of Selim III Giray. By this point, Russia and the Ottoman Empire had been at war with each other since 1768, with the Crimean Khanate getting caught up in it. In 1774, Russia defeated the Ottomans, and the subsequent Treaty of Küçük Kaynarca saw Crimea become independent.

Sahib II was no longer a subject to the Ottomans, however this wouldn't last for long. In spring of 1775, he was overthrown by a group of disgruntled beys. He then fled to the Ottoman Empire, being welcomed by Sultan Abdulhamid I, and was given a generous pension and allowed to live in Bulgaria. He died in 1807 in Çatalca.
