= Qaplan I Giray =

Khan of the Crimean Khanate

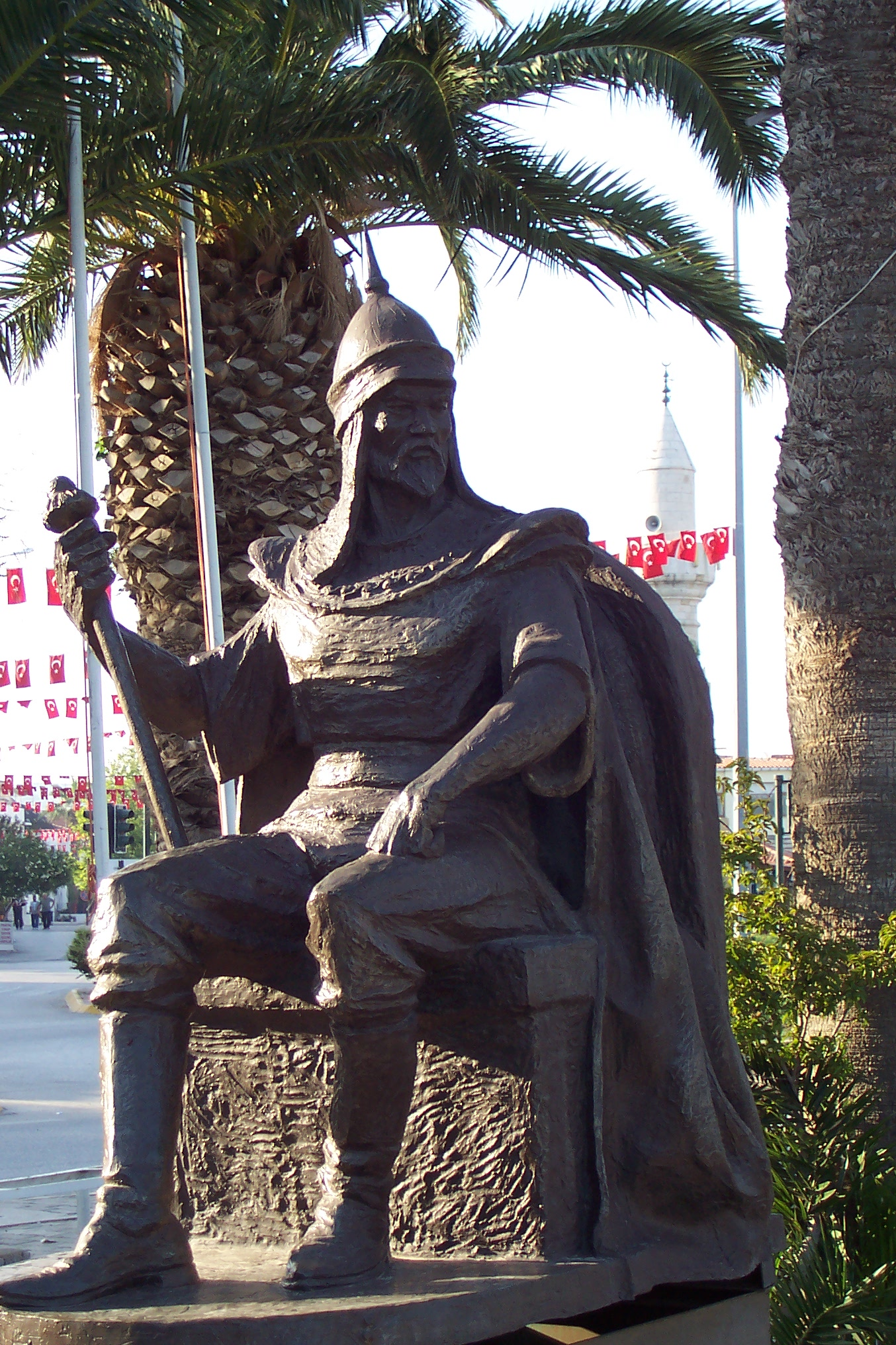

Khan of the Tatar Crimean Khanate
- Reign: 1707–1708; 1713–1715; 1730–1736
- Predecessor: Ğazı III Giray; Devlet II Giray; Meñli II Giray
- Successor: Devlet II Giray; Devlet III Giray; Fetih II Giray
- Born: 1678
- Died: 1738 (aged 59–60)
- Dynasty: Giray dynasty
- Religion: Islam

Qaplan I Giray (Note: Crimean Tatar, Ottoman Turkish and Persian: قپلان کرای) (1678–1738) was three times khan of the Crimean Khanate. He was the son of Selim I Giray and thus one of the six brothers who ruled for most of the period from 1699 to 1743. During his first reign he was defeated by the Kabardians. His second reign ended when he did not fully support the Turks in the Balkans. During his third reign Russia invaded Crimea and burned its capital. He and his brothers, as members of the House of Giray, were direct patrilineal descendants of Tuqa-Timur, son of Jochi Khan, the founder of the Golden Horde.

== First reign (1707–1708) ==
He came to the throne in 1707 following the deposition of his brother Ğazı III Giray. His kalga and nureddin were his brothers Meñli II Giray and Maksud. Maksud soon died and was followed by Sahib, another brother. He sent Meñli to discuss things with the Circassian Kabardians. Meñli was arrogant, and the Kabardians attacked and killed many of his men, but he himself escaped. Qaplan then led a large army including 3,000 Turks against the rebellious Kabardians. The war was a disaster (Battle of Kanzhal, September 1708). He lost most of his men, including the Shirin and Mansur begs, was wounded in the arm, and fled. For this, and perhaps because he had given asylum to some fleeing Cossacks, he was deposed and exiled to Rhodes. His brother Devlet II Giray was restored.

== 1708–1713 ==
Devlet II Giray's second reign mostly involved the consequences of the Battle of Poltava. Devlet was removed from power for treating the exiled Swedish king as a prisoner, and Qaplan was restored.

== Second reign (1713–1715) ==
He appointed as kalga and nureddin his brothers Meñli II Giray and Safa. His first task was to send Meñli to deal with the Kuban Nogais who had revolted under Bakhti Giray, the eldest son of his brother Devlet II. The Turks called him to fight in the Balkans. The beys resisted, there were delays and when he, or perhaps his brother Selyamet, arrived too late, the Turks removed him.

== 1716–1730 ==
- 1716: Devlet II Giray reigned briefly and was removed because of Crimean opposition.
- 1717: Saadet IV Giray fought in the north Caucasus and resigned because he was unable to control his nobles.
- 1724: Meñli II Giray (first reign) restored order in Crimea but was removed because of a coup in Istanbul.
- 1730: Qaplan appointed for the third time.

== Third reign 1730–1736 ==
He was appointed in Istanbul in November 1730. His kalga and nureddin were Adil and Haji Giray. Many people exiled by Meñli returned and there were shifts in power within the Crimean ruling class. It is possible that the exiles had something to do with Meñli’s overthrow.

In 1733 or 1734 he went to Bender and Khotyn to support the French candidate during the War of the Polish Succession. The sources do not explain what he did.

During his reign Russia and Turkey went to war. At the time of his appointment in 1730, Persia was regaining lands it had lost to Turkey in 1722. The Turks considered using Crimean troops against Persia, as they had in 1725. Before leaving Istanbul in 1730 Qaplan recommended caution since any campaign in the north Caucasus might provoke the Russians, who were now within striking distance of Crimea.

In 1733 or 1734 the Turks had Qaplan send a force under Fetih (possibly Fetih I Giray) across the north Caucasus. Eropkin tried to stop him at the Terek River and lost 55 men. The army went down the west shore of the Caspian as far as the Samur River, where it was recalled by Turkey for unexplained reasons. In 1735 Qaplan personally led 80,000 men across the north Caucasus and stopped in Chechnya, where the Chechens inflicted a crushing defeat on his army, killing 10,000 Crimean soldiers. He continued to Dagestan and then south to Derbent. At the end of 1735 he heard of Leontev’s raid on Crimea and turned back. He spent time foraging in Kabardia and reached Crimea in the spring of 1736. These two raids were one pretext for the Russian invasion.

With Crimean troops away from the peninsula and the Turks tied down with Persia, Russia had an opportunity for a surprise attack. In 1735 General Münnich went south and found that his army would not be ready until the following year. Leontev raided toward Crimea but turned back because it was too late in the season.

In April 1736 Muennich marched to Crimea. By 19 May he had 30000 troops facing Perekop. On 20 May the wall was breached and two days later the Or Qapi fort surrendered. Russia now entered Crimea for the first time. In June they captured Bakhchisarai and burned the khan’s palace. Most of the Crimean army scattered to the hills while the Turks withdrew to Kaffa. One writer says that Kaplan was unable to command because of gout. Muennich hoped to capture Kaffa, but on 25 June decided to withdraw. A third of his army was sick with dysentery and many of the rest were weakened. There was also not enough food, fresh water or fodder to support his army. By mid-July he was back on the Dnieper bend, having lost half of his army, 2000 of them to fighting and the rest from disease. Because of the invasion Qaplan was replaced by Fetih II Giray, who faced a second invasion the following year.

== Retirement and death ==
Qaplan was deposed in August or September 1736 and went to Chios. Later he moved to Gallipoli and then back to Chios. He died in November-December 1738. He was buried in the courtyard of a school in Çeşme across the strait from Chios. The town has a statue of him.

== General references ==
- Henry Hoyle Howorth, History of the Mongols, 1880, Part 2, pp. 556,569,570, 571–572, 574-575
- Davies, Brian, Empire and Military Revolution in Eastern Europe, 2011, Chapter Five
- V. D. Smirnov (1887) http://www.krimoved-library.ru/books/krimskoe-hanstvo-v-xviii-veke.html
- Giray-Ilim: Rose Bush of Khans, compiled by Khalim Giray in 1811, modernized Turkish with many additions by Ablyakim Ilim (before 1947), Russian translation with additions and deletions of obsolete material by Kemal Usenov, 2004. *http://www.vostlit.info/Texts/Dokumenty/Krym/XV/Rozovyj_kust_chanov/29.phtml?id=12949.
- Battle of Kanzhal: Barasbi Bgazhnokov: victory or death section of
- Military maps for 1736: Amin, Agha H, Atlas of Russo Turkish Wars, Russo Turkish War 1735-39, Volume 4, no date
- Giray family tree: Oleksa Gaivoronsky «Повелители двух материков», Kiev-Bakhchisarai, second edition, 2010, volume 2, endpaper
