= Halim Giray =

Halim Giray (Note: Crimean Tatar, Ottoman Turkish and Persian: حلیم کرای) (1689–1759) was a Crimean khan from the Giray dynasty. He was the son of the Crimean khan Saadet IV Giray and grandson of Selim I Gerai. His vizier was Bahadır Ağa, whose father had been Saadet's vizier during his reign.
