= Devlet II Giray =

Khan of the Tatar Crimean Khanate

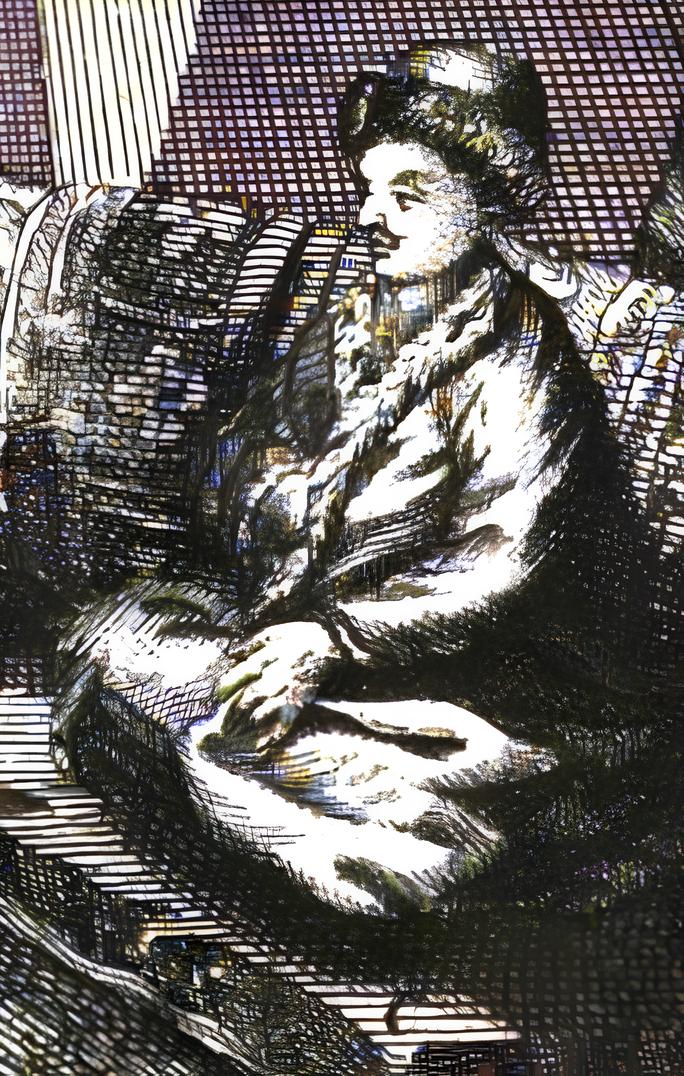

Khan of Crimea
- 1st reign: 1699–1702
- Predecessor: Selim I Giray
- Successor: Selim I Giray
- 2nd reign: 1709–1713
- Predecessor: Qaplan I Giray
- Successor: Qaplan I Giray
- Born: 1648
- Died: 1718 (Aged 69-70)
- Dynasty: Giray dynasty
- Religion: Islam

Devlet II Giray (Note: Crimean Tatar, Ottoman Turkish and Persian: دولت کرای ثانی) (1648–1718) was Khan of the Crimean Khanate from 1699 to 1702 and from 1709 to 1713. He was the eldest son of Selim I Giray.

== First rule (1699–1702) ==
Selim I Giray, after his retirement in 1699, recommended Devlet II Giray Khan to the post who was confirmed in the rank of Khan by the Ottoman Empire. In the early years of his reign, he faced a conflict that broke out between his brothers and Kalga Nureddin for important positions within the Khanate. One participant in the dispute, Goran Gaza, fled to Bujak and there gathered around himself rebellious Nogays that had intended to leave the subordination of the Crimea. This rebellion was suppressed by Devlet II Giray. Soon Khan had difficulties with foreign states. The Ottoman Empire, which signed peace treaty with Moscow, ignored all the warnings of the Khan, who reported on the plans of Peter I of Russia to continue to wage war in the south. Devlet II Giray tried to organize an army against the will of the Ottoman sultan Mustafa II, but was immediately stripped of his power. Sultan restored Selim I Giray to the Crimean throne.

== Second reign 1709-1713 ==
Much of his second reign involved the conflicts between Peter the Great and Charles XII of Sweden. During the Great Northern War Ivan Mazepa revolted against Russia and Charles moved east to join him. Both were defeated at the Battle of Poltava in July 1709, about six months after Devlet came to the throne. Some of Mazepa's Cossacks were settled in Crimean territory at Oleshky. Charles fled to Ottoman territory and tried to stir up a Swedish-Turkish-Crimean war against Russia. When the Turks failed to expel Charles, Peter invaded Moldavia (Pruth River Campaign of 1710). A Turkish army went north, 40,000 Tatars under Devlet's son went northwest and Peter was surrounded. He was allowed to withdraw by signing a treaty in which he gave up Azov and smaller forts near the Sea of Azov (1711). Devlet continued to press for Turkish action against the growing power of Russia. In 1713 the Sultan ordered Devlet and Ismail Pasha to escort Charles to Poland (it is not clear to which faction). Charles refused and was captured (Skirmish at Bender). There was a shift in Turkish policy and Devlet was deposed (December 1713), partly because of his mistreatment of Charles at Bender.

One source says that in early 1711 Devlet's son Mekhmed, Mazepa's successor and some Swedes, Poles and Turkish soldiers raided around Bratslav, fought a number of battles and retreated to Bender at the approach of a Russian army. The same spring Devlet himself moved on Kharkov, was defeated, and returned to Crimea.

== Second dethronement and death ==
Sultan Ahmed III deposed Devlet II Giray from the throne of the Crimean Khanate following allegations of improper treatment of the Swedish King Charles XII (who sought asylum in Turkey) during the campaigns against Russia (Devlet II Giray considered Charles XII a prisoner) and sent him into exile to the Ottoman island of Rodos in the Aegean Sea. Devlet II Giray then moved to Vize in present-day Turkey and died there in 1719.

== Sources and notes ==
- Henry Hoyle Howorth, History of the Mongols, 1880, Part 2, pp. 568-570(outdated), 572-574

Preceded by Selim I Giray	Khan of Crimea; 1699–1702	Succeeded by Selim I Giray
Preceded by Qaplan I Giray	Khan of Crimea; 1709–1713	Succeeded by Qaplan I Giray
