= Giray dynasty =

Ruling dynasty of the Khanate of Crimea

House of Giray
- Parent house: Borjigin Dynasty
- Country: Crimean Khanate
- Founded: 1431 (by Hacı I Giray)
- Titles: Khan of Crimea; Khan of Qasim; Khan of Kazan; Khan of Astrakhan; Khan of Ulugh Ulus (after 1502)
- Dissolution: Qasim: 1512; Astrakhan: 1523, 1531, 1549; Kazan: 1551; Crimea: 1783; Budjak Horde: 1792

The House of Giray (Crimean Tatar: Geraylar, كرايلر; Ottoman Turkish: آل جنكيز, romanized: Âl-i Cengiz, lit. 'Genghisids'), also the Girays, were a Genghisid Turkic dynasty that reigned in the Khanate of Crimea from its formation in 1431 until its downfall in 1783. The dynasty also supplied several khans of Kazan and Astrakhan between 1521 and 1550. Apart from the royal Girays, there was also a lateral branch, the Choban Girays (Çoban Geraylar).

Before reaching the age of majority, young Girays were brought up in one of the Circassian tribes, where they were instructed in the arts of war. The Giray Khans were elected by other Crimean Tatar dynasts, called myrzas (mırzalar). They also elected an heir apparent, called the qalgha sultan (qalğa sultan). In later centuries, the Ottoman Sultan obtained the right of installing and deposing the khans at his will.

Their early ancestor was Togay Timur (Tuqa Timur), a younger son of Jochi. The story of the Girays begin with Öreng Timur, son of Togay Timur, receiving Crimea from Mengu-Timur.

From a genetic point of view, the Giray dynasty, according to the researches, is most likely to carry the Asian branch of R1a haplogroup (R1a-Z93) The definitive resolution to the question of the genetic lineage of the Girays hinges on the analysis of Hacı Giray's paleo-DNA. However, despite the initiation of DNA studies in 2017, the results remain undisclosed to date.

== During Ottoman suzerainty ==
According to some scholars (S. S. Montefiore etc.), the Girays were regarded as the second family of the Ottoman Empire after the House of Ottoman: "If Rome and Byzantium represented two of the three international traditions of imperial legitimacy, the blood of Genghis Khan was the third... If ever the Ottomans became extinct, it was understood that the Genghisid Girays would succeed them".

During the 15th and early 16th centuries, the Giray Khan was second to the Ottoman Emperor - and thus superior to the Grand Vizier - in the Ottoman protocol. After the disobedience and 1584 removal of Mehmed II Giray, the Sultan demoted the Crimean Khan to the level of Grand Vizier. The Giray Khans were also sovereigns of their own realm. They could mint coins, make law by decree, and had their own tughras.

=== Alliances ===
The Crimean Khanate made alliances with the Polish–Lithuanian Commonwealth and with the Zaporizhian Sich. The assistance of İslâm III Giray during the Khmelnytsky Uprising in 1648 contributed greatly to the initial momentum of military successes for the Cossacks. The relationship with the Polish–Lithuanian Commonwealth was also strong - the dynasty of Girays would seek sanctuary in Lithuania in the 15th century before establishing themselves on the Crimean peninsula.

== Downfall ==
After the khanate's annexation by Imperial Russia in 1783, the last khan Şahin Giray remained nominally in power until 1787, when he took refuge in the Ottoman Empire, and was executed in Rhodes.

Other dynasts were permitted by the Russian authorities to reside in their Bakhchisaray palace. Selim III's young son, Qattı Giray, was converted by missionaries to Protestantism and married a Scottish heiress, Anne Neilson.

== After downfall ==
After the execution of Şahin Giray by Abdul Hamid I, his family lived in Burgazada, Istanbul.

== Genetics ==
According to genetic studies, the Giray dynasty is most likely associated with the R1a-Z93 haplogroup, which is prevalent among the Turkic peoples of Eurasia. However, further research is necessary to refine and confirm the genetic data pertaining to the Girays. Crimean Tatar descendants of the Giray dynasty are carriers of the Asian branch of R1a (R1a-Z93) which is nearly absent from the gene pool of Mongolic peoples, but is very common among the Turkic peoples of Eastern Europe and of Siberia, especially Altai.. The Girays are descendants of Jochi, the eldest son of Genghis Khan. Nevertheless, the absence of reliable genetic data on the descendants of Chagatai, Tolui, or Ögedei leaves unresolved the question of whether Jochi was indeed the biological son of Genghis Khan. The hypothesized haplogroup of Genghis Khan spans a range of possibilities, including C3c-M48 and R1b-M343, based on current genetic analyses. However, conclusive determination remains uncertain due to the limitations of available data and the need for further research.

== See also ==
- List of Crimean khans
- List of Kazan khans
- Girey-kala
