= Battle of Bursztyn =

1629 Polish-Tatar battle

- Part of Tatar raids on the Commonwealth
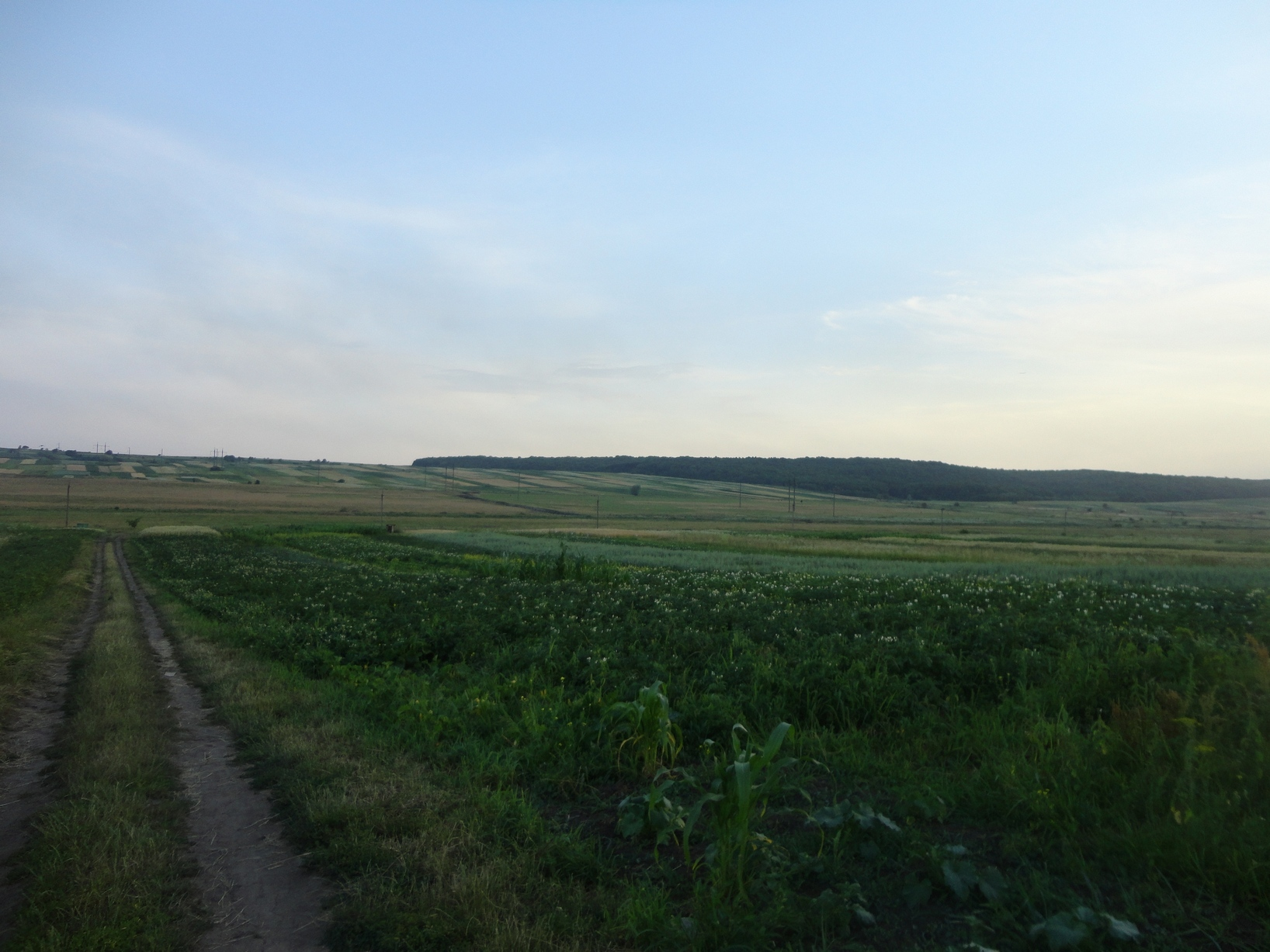
- Outskirts of Burshtyn, where the battle took place
Date	9 October of 1629
Location	Near Bursztyn, Polish-Lithuanian Commonwealth (now Ivano-Frankivsk Oblast, Ukraine)
Result	Polish–Lithuanian–Cossack victory

Belligerents
Polish–Lithuanian Commonwealth; Zaporozhian Cossacks	Crimean Khanate; Nogai Horde

Commanders and leaders
Stefan Chmielecki; Hryhoriy Chorny	Kalga Devlet-Giray; Aslan-Giray (POW); Khan Temir

Strength
2,000 Poles and Cossacks	10,000–15,000 men

Casualties and losses
Unknown	Many killed 2,000 captured
- 10,000 captives were freed

The Battle of Bursztyn or Battle of Gnila Lipa was a battle that took place in October of 1629 between the Polish-Lithuanian-Cossack army of Stanislaw Chmielecki and Hrytsko Chornyi against the Crimean Tatar raiders.

== Background ==
Following the Doroshenko's invasion of Crimea in 1628 and his death in the battle of Alma river, the Cossacks initially elected Moyzhenitsa as their hetman, however soon he was executed. After that, the unregistered Cossacks elected Taras Fedorovych as their hetman, while the registered ones elected Hrytsko Chornyi, who had pursued a Pro-Polish policy of Petro Sahaidachny among the Cossacks. In June of 1629, the Cossacks attempted to re-install Mehmed III Giray on the Crimean throne, however their expedition failed and Mehmed Giray was killed, while his brother Shahin Giray fled to Persia. Two months later, in August, a large Crimean army led by kalga Devlet-Giray, Aslan-Giray (more known as İslâm III Giray) and Khan Temir invaded the Commonwealth. The Tatars devastated Galicia and Belz land. Once finding out about being pursued by the Polish-Cossack army, Devlet Giray paused the raid and started returning to Crimea with the captured loot and slaves.

== Battle ==
Due to the main forces withdrawing from Poland, the Allies were now to fight the remnants of the Tatar army. The Tatar unit, which was attacked during the battle, had build up a camp near the village of Koniushky after being assured by a Cossack captive that there are no Polish units nearby. On the night of 9 October, the Polish-Cossack army of Chmielecki crossed the Gnila Lipa river and stood up near the Tatar camp. On the morning, when the Tatars were about to retreat, the Poles unexpectedly attacked their camp and inflicted heavy casualties on them. The Tatars began to retreat, being chased by the Poles for approximately 3 miles. Many of them were killed while crossing the Uście on the Dniester.

== Aftermath ==
The Tatars suffered a heavy defeat. In total, during the entire expedition, the Tatars lost about 8,000 people. The victors liberated all 10 thousand Christian captives, including several noble ladies, and captured over 2 thousand Tatars. Month later, another Tatar unit was humiliated by Stanisław Lubomirski near Uście. In 1630, the Polish government sent an envoy Aleksandr Piaseczyński in order to avoid the potential war with the Ottoman Empire. The future Crimean khan, Aslan-Giray, was held captive in Poland until he was freed in exchange for the several Polish noblemans.

== Bibliography ==
- Kołodziejczyk, Dariusz (2011). The Crimean Khanate and Poland-Lithuania: international diplomacy on the European periphery (15th-18th century) ; a study of peace treaties followed by annotated documents (PDF). The Ottoman Empire and its heritage. Leiden Boston: Brill. ISBN 978-90-04-21571-9.
- Hrushevskyi, Mykhailo (1956). Том VIII. Розділ II. Історія України-Руси. Похід Девлєт-Ґерая на Україну і погром під Бурштином. Напруженнє між реєстровими і нереєстровими, Левко Іванович і Грицько Савич. New York.
