= Battle of the Alma (1628) =

1628 battle in Crimea

- Part of the Crimean campaign (1628) and the Ottoman-Crimean-Zaporozhian conflict (1624-1629)
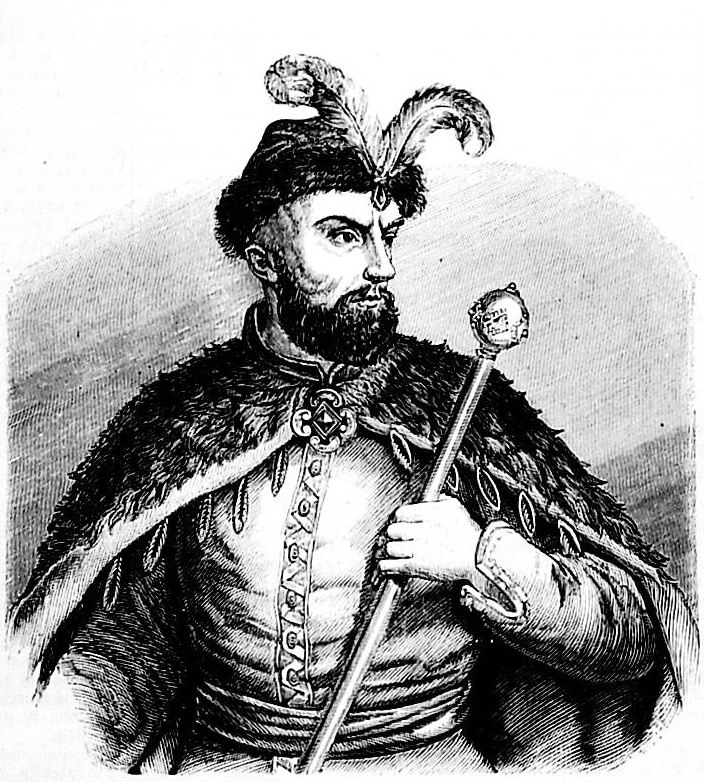
- Cossack hetman Mykhailo Doroshenko
Date	31 May 1628
Location	At Alma river, Crimean Khanate
Result	Cossack victory
Territorial changes	Cossack army lifts the siege of Bakhchysarai

Belligerents
Zaporozhian Cossacks; Supporters of Mehmed III (Note: Fought against Khan Temir's army at Bakhchysarai)	Budjak Horde; Ottoman Empire; Supporters of Canibek Giray

Commanders and leaders
Mykhailo Doroshenko †; Olifer Holub †; Moyzhenitsa; Shahin Giray	Khan Temir (WIA)

Strength
4,000 Cossacks (Note: Doroshenko's army of registered Cossacks consisted of 1 thousand people, likely meaning that the 3 thousand Cossacks that also participated in campaign were unregistered ones); Several artillery pieces	Way more than the Cossacks

Casualties and losses
100 to 1,000 killed	200 killed 12 cannons

The battle of the Alma (Ukrainian: Битва на Альмі) was a battle that took place on 31 of May, 1628 between a 4,000-strong army of the Zaporozhian Cossacks led by hetman Mykhailo Doroshenko and a colonel Olifer Holub, and the Budjak Horde army of Khan Temir, supported by the Ottoman janissaries. In the course of battle, Zaporozhian Cossacks defeated the army of Khan Temir, which allowed them to lift the siege of Bakhchysarai. Despite the victory in this battle, both Mykhailo Doroshenko and Olifer Holub were killed, and the Cossack campaign itself eventually ended in a failure.

== Background ==
The Ottoman−Crimean confrontation was going on since the year 1623, when Mehmed III Giray was elected as a khan. His Pro-independence and Anti-Ottoman policy did not fit the sultan's interests, he decided to overthrow him. In the spring of 1624, the Ottoman army led by Topal Recep Pasha invaded Crimea and declared about the installation of Canibek Giray on the Crimean throne. After Mehmed Giray refused, the Ottoman army started incursion into the Crimean territory. Near Karasubazar his army was attacked by the Zaporozhian Cossacks and the Crimean cavalry, which forced him to withdraw from Crimea and recognise Mehmed III as a khan. Soon after that, Shahin Giray and Mykhailo Doroshenko signed a treaty between the Zaporozhian Sich and Crimean Khanate, which was however broken by the Crimean side under the pressure of Poland-Lithuania that was fighting the Cossack rebels of Marko Zhmaylo. In 1628, the Ottoman army once again started preparations for a replacement of Mehmed with Canibek Giray, leading to a new conflict between the two states. This time however, Mehmed Giray had much less support than in 1624, most of the Crimean Tatar nobility joined the side of Canibek, this was also accompanied by an unsuccessful attempt of Shahin Giray to force Khan Temir to fulfill his obligations in the face of Crimean Khanate. Shahin's campaign failed and led to Khan Temir's invasion into Crimean peninsula. Soon, the Nogai army, supported by the Ottoman janissaries, laid siege on the khan's capital Bakhchysarai. Mykhailo Doroshenko found out about the situation in Crimea from Bolgar-Murza, who was sent by Mehmed Giray to Zaporozhia in order to negotiate.

== Battle ==
At the end of May, Doroshenko's army destroyed Aslan-Kerman and approached Perekop, where they were encircled by Nogai forces. The Cossacks had built up a defensive camp and started moving towards Bakhchysarai while repelling Nogai attacks. At the Alma river near Bakhchysarai, a general battle took place − Doroshenko's army was attacked by the main forces of Khan Temir, who had left only a small regiment near Bakhchysarai. As a result of the battle, Khan Temir's army was humiliated, he himself was wounded and forced to flee. It is known that the Cossacks used heavy artillery during their clashes with the Nogais. The Cossacks lost, according to different sources, 100, 200 or 1,000 people in this battle.

== Aftermath ==
Following the battle, the Cossack army entered Bakhchysarai and united with the army of Mehmed III Giray, who had only several hundred men with him. The united army then advanced towards Kaffa. Near the city, they once again defeated Khan Temir's army, almost killing him. However, as soon as the Ottoman fleet of 25 ships, accompanied by the land armies of Huseyin Pasha and Kenan Pasha, started approaching Kaffa, a large part of Mehmed's army went over to Canibek's side, which forced him to flee his camp together with some of his supporters. After that, the Cossack forces and Shahin Giray started their retreat towards Zaporozhia. Devlet Giray's attempts to pursuit them ended in a failure. Canibek reached Bakhchysarai on 9 of July and was officially installed on the Crimean throne. From Zaporozhia, Mehmed and Shahin Giray's continued their attempts to reclaim the government in Crimea - in November 1628 the 14,000-strong Crimean-Cossack army invaded Crimea but was defeated at Perekop by the forces of Canibek Giray and Khan Temir. Another attempt to invade Crimea took place in May 1629, however, because of Mehmed's attempt to surrender to Canibek, he was killed by the Cossacks, while Shahin Giray fled to Persia.

== See also ==
- Crimean campaign (1624)
- Mykhailo Doroshenko
- Mehmed III Giray
- Canibek Giray
- Khan Temir

== Bibliography ==
- Smoliy, V.A. (2014). Крим: шлях крізь віки. Історія у запитаннях і відповідях – 456 с. (PDF). Інститут історії України.
