= Crimean campaign (1624) =

- Part of the Ottoman–Crimean–Zaporozhian conflict (1624-1629)
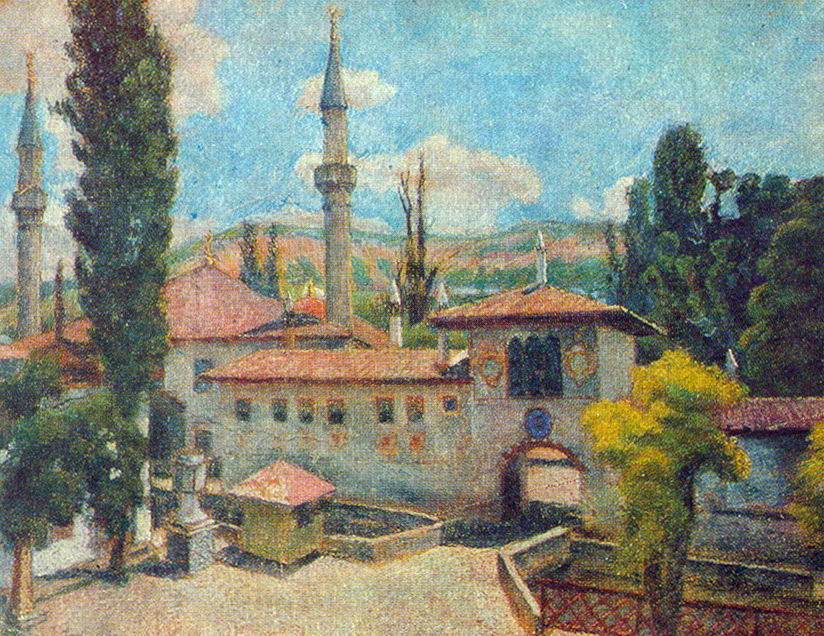
- Khan's palace in Bakhchysarai. Painting by Ilya Mashkov
Date	May–October 1624
Location	Kaffa, Karasubazar, Danube delta, Crimea
Result	Crimean–Cossack victory
Territorial changes	Ottoman plan to overthrow Mehmed Giray fails

Belligerents
Crimean Khanate; Zaporozhian Cossacks	Ottoman Empire; Supporters of Canibek Giray

Commanders and leaders
Mehmed III Giray; Shahin Giray; Mykhailo Doroshenko	Topal Recep Pasha; Hasan Pasha †; Ibrahim Pasha †; Canibek Giray

Strength
Unknown but more than the Ottomans; 800 Cossacks	10,000 men 40 galleys

Casualties and losses
Unknown	Heavy

The Crimean campaign (Note: Crimean Tatar: Qırım Seferi Turkish: Kırım Seferi Ukrainian: Кримський похід) was an unsuccessful Ottoman military expedition to Crimea aimed at removing Mehmed III Giray and replacing him with more loyal ruler, Canibek Giray. The 10,000-strong Ottoman army landed in Kaffa and started advancing inside the Crimean territory. Near Karasubazar his army was attacked by Zaporozhian Cossacks that were allied with Mehmed III. Facing defeat, the Ottoman army returned back to Kaffa. Soon, after some time of fighting, Mehmed's army entered and captured Kaffa, leading to a peace talks and a Turkish temporary withdrawal from Crimea.

== Background ==
Ever since Mehmed III Giray became a khan of Crimea 1623, replacing the Canibek Giray who was put to blame about the defeats during the Khotyn war, the Crimean-Ottoman relations went down. Mehmed started repressions against the opposition, which was one of the reasons why the Crimean beys began complaining to the Ottoman Empire about Mehmed Giray, where, in the meanwhile, Murad IV became a new sultan. One of their complaints was that the Don Cossacks had just raided Crimea and Mehmed did not stop them. Mehmed was told to lead an army to Persia, where a new war had just began. Mehmed refused, saying that he had to defend Crimea against the Zaporozhians. (Note: In 1551 Sahib I Giray was overthrown for refusing to fight the Persians, as was Mehmed's grandfather Mehmed II Giray in 1584.) Eventually, the Ottoman commandership decided to replace Mehmed with a ruler, more loyal to the Ottoman Empire. In the meanwhile, some of the Cossacks raided Kaffa. It is largely considered that they acted independently, although some sources claim that the attack was coordinated with Crimean Khan. After some of them found themselves on a Crimean coast, Mehmed Giray, instead of capturing and selling them, called them to his service, which they accepted, considering they had no other choice. This was accompanied by the return of Shahin Giray, who was held captive in Persia before. The Ottoman invasion army was approximately 10,000-strong. Mehmed Giray's army was way bigger and included Kumyks, Nogais and Circassians. Mehmed Giray also had a personal guard of 2,000 Qizilbashs.

== Campaign ==
The campaign began in May of 1624, when the Ottoman forces led by Topal Recep landed in Kaffa and united with local beylerbey. Canibek landed in Kaffa on 22 of May. Topal Recep then declared about the abdication of Mehmed Giray and about the installation of Canibek on the Crimean throne. Mehmed did not accept this, a fighting began. Using the fact that most of the Ottoman fleet was in Crimea, in July the Zaporozhian Cossacks led by Mykhailo Doroshenko successfully raided Istanbul, reaching Bosporus during their attack. On 1 of August, the Ottoman army launched another advance into Crimea, however soon they were ambushed by the Crimean cavalry and the Zaporozhian Cossacks near Karasubazar. A fighting lasted all day until the army commander decided to retreat back to Kaffa. Soon after that, the Crimean-Cossack army of Mehmed Giray captured Kaffa and forced Topal Recep to accept negotiations. The sultan was to recognise Mehmed as a khan in exchange for his withdrawal from Kaffa and liberation of the captured Ottoman soldiers. In the meanwhile, Shahin Giray attacked the Ottoman fortresses in Danube delta but was defeated by the army of Ochakov beylerbey.

== Aftermath ==
Hasan Pasha and Ibrahim Pasha were killed during this campaign. The Cossacks had played a crucial role in repelling the Ottoman invasion. Soon after the campaign ended, in autumn of 1624, they were sent back to Zaporozhia. Mehmed III and Shahin Giray realised that the Ottomans won't give up their influence in Crimea so they started negotiating with Polish government and the Cossack hetman Doroshenko. In the end of 1624, the first known Zaporozhian-Crimean treaty was signed. The treaty, however, was broken by the Crimean side in Autumn of 1625 under the pressure of Poland-Lithuania, which at the time had faced a conflict with the Cossacks. In 1625, Shahin Giray was defeated by the Budjak Horde of Khan Temir in the battle of Babadağ. In 1628, the Ottoman army led by Çatalcalı Hasan Pasha once again invaded Crimea, defeated the Crimean-Cossack allies and managed to replace Mehmed III with Canibek Giray. Mykhailo Doroshenko was killed there, Mehmed fled from Crimea and Shahin Giray, together with remaining Cossacks, retreated to Zaporozhia. From there, Mehmed and Shahin Giray continued their attempts to seize the government in Crimea, having Cossacks behind their back and attempting to gain support from the Polish–Lithuanian Commonwealth. (Note: The Polish–Lithuanian Commonwealth did not attempted to intervene militarily, however it allowed the Cossacks to continue their support for the Crimean opposition)

== Bibliography ==
- Öztuna, Yılmaz (1966). "Türkiye Tarihi", Hayat Kitapları, c. 9. Istanbul.
- İnalcık, Halil (2014). Kırım Hanlığı Tarihi Üzerine Araştırmalar 1441-1700. Istanbul.
