= Thirty Years' War in Eastern Europe =

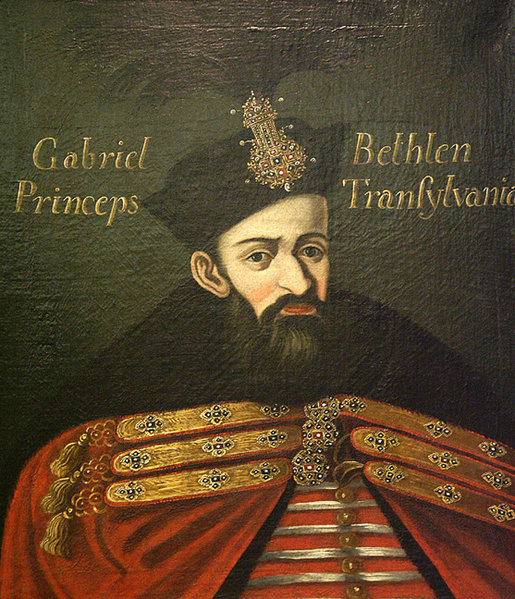
- Gabriel Bethlen, anti-Habsburg leader in Transylvania
Date	1619–1645
Location	Eastern Europe, Baltic Sea, Adriatic Sea
Result	Peace of Nikolsburg, Pressburg and Linz; Treaty of Khotyn; Treaty of Stuhmsdorf; Treaty of Polyanovka

Belligerents
Holy Roman Empire; Habsburg Hungary; Polish-Lithuanian Commonwealth	Ottoman Empire; Transylvania; (Tsardom of Russia) Russia; (yes) Swedish Empire

Commanders and leaders
(Holy Roman Empire) Ferdinand II; (Holy Roman Empire) Ferdinand III; (Polish–Lithuanian Commonwealth) Sigismund III Vasa; (Polish–Lithuanian Commonwealth) Władysław IV Vasa	(Ottoman Empire) Osman II; (Transylvania) Gabor Bethlen; (Transylvania) George I Rákóczi; (Swedish Empire) Gustavus Adolphus

The Thirty Years' War in Eastern Europe refers to the wider impact of the Thirty Years' War on regions outside the main areas of conflict in Germany and Central Europe.

The extent to which the Thirty Years' War can be seen as a single event occurring within coherent geographical boundaries has long been discussed by historians. While not directly involved, countries and regions outside the main areas of conflict were also affected, and in some respects, the war can therefore be seen as a Pan-European event.

Events in Eastern Europe were driven by a mixture of anti-Habsburg sentiment, strategic concerns, opportunism, religion, economics, and dynastic rivalry. These were often exploited for diplomatic advantage by outside powers, including Sweden, the Dutch Republic, France, Austria, Spain, and the Ottoman Empire.

== Origins ==
Ottoman involvement was the consequence of a long-running competition with Austria for control of Central Europe. During the Thirty Years' War, this took the form of diplomatic support for the anti-Habsburg cause in general. Ottoman statesmen promoted internal risings throughout the Holy Roman Empire, particularly in Austrian Hungary, generally employing the vassal state of Transylvania to provide military manpower.

This made the Ottomans an obvious diplomatic target when the Bohemian Revolt began in 1618, and in 1620 Frederick V of the Palatinate sent a mission to Constantinople. However, the 1606 Treaty of Zsitvatorok had ended the most recent conflict in favour of Austria, while the Ottomans were also competing with Safavid Iran in the east. As a result, they remained neutral for much of this period, although willing to finance small scale risings against Austria.

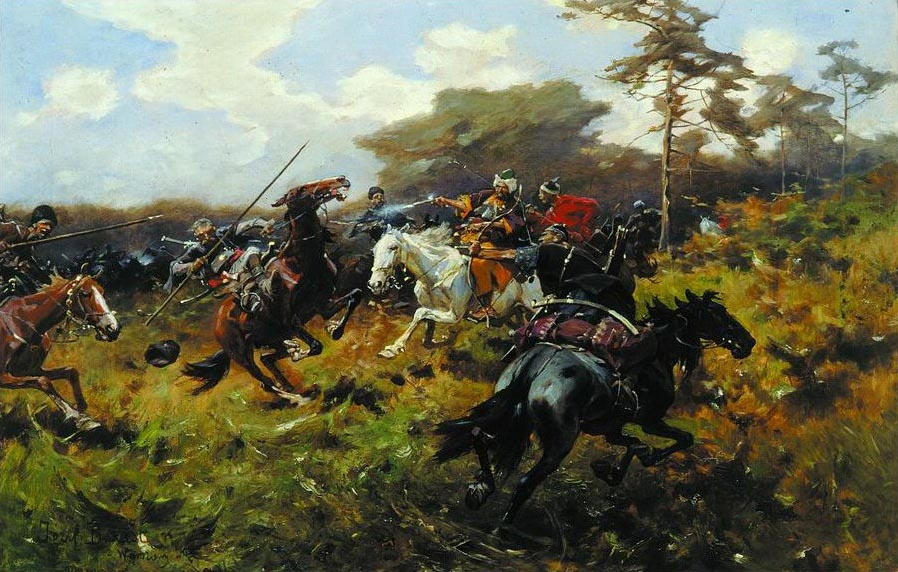
Polish mercenaries known as the Lisowczyks, who helped suppress the Bohemian Revolt

The Bohemian delegates offered to pay an annual tribute, and allow Ottoman troops free passage across their lands in the event of war against other Christian powers. Their proposal faced intense diplomatic opposition from Austria, whose ambassador argued it contravened the Treaty of Zsitvatorok, which had been renewed in 1615. His efforts to prevent Ottoman interference in Bohemia were backed by Spain, which sought to open a new front against the Ottomans outside the Mediterranean Sea, and one independent of Austria.

Despite this, early success prompted the Ottomans to send an envoy to Prague, promising 60,000 men, but rebel defeat at the Battle of White Mountain in November 1620 meant this never transpired. At the same time, pro-Habsburg forces received support from Sigismund III Vasa, then king of Poland. In 1619, he financed a mercenary force known as the Lisowczyks, which fought for the Imperial cause in Transylvania and Bohemia. Much of the Szlachta, or Polish nobility, sympathised with the Habsburgs largely due to a shared Catholicism, but the Sejm of the Polish–Lithuanian Commonwealth viewed Sigismund's initiative as a threat to their power, and insisted on neutrality.

== Transylvania and Hungary ==
Transylvania, 1606–1660

Taking advantage of the Bohemian revolt, in the summer of 1619 the Hungarian Landstände issued a list of complaints against the emperor and demands for reform. In July 1619, Gabriel Bethlen, Prince of Transylvania, invaded Austrian Hungary, ostensibly in support of anti-Habsburg Protestant rebels. By late October, his forces had reached as far as Bratislava, diverting Habsburg resources eastwards. He then joined the Bohemian army in besieging Vienna, but had to return home when local rivals sponsored by Poland won a victory in Eastern Slovakia at Humenné, then invaded Transylvania.

Initial success led Bethlen to pursue his vision of creating a reunified Calvinist Greater Hungary, or at least turn Transylvania into an independent power, free of either Austrian or Ottoman control. In 1620, he proposed a new invasion of Habsburg Hungary to Osman II. However, the Ottomans opposed any idea of an independent Transylvania, let alone the creation of an enlarged Hungarian state ruled by Bethlen on their borders.

Despite diplomatic pressure from the Dutch, who viewed Bethlen as part of their anti-Habsburg alliance, Osman was reluctant to provide substantive backing. At the same time, military resources were diverted by other conflicts, including the Polish–Ottoman War (1620–1621) and Moldavian Magnate Wars. They also had to deal with Cossack raids backed by the Poles, who accused Bethlen of threatening regional stability. With Constantinople on the verge of war with Iran, this meant minimal support for his 1621 offensive.

Despite this, Austrian weakness allowed Bethlen to retain most of his previous gains. However, by late 1621 tensions had developed with his Hungarian supporters over the distribution of property confiscated from the Catholic Church, and his brutal military tactics. In January 1622, Austria signed the Peace of Nikolsburg in which they ceded the Partium, but in return Bethlen renounced any claim to the title King of Hungary. A new invasion in 1623 came to nothing due to political turmoil in Constantinople, before Murad IV withdrew support from Transylvania in 1624. Signs of Habsburg recovery following their victory in the Palatinate campaign combined with the outbreak of the Ottoman–Safavid War (1623–1639) meant he wished to avoid a two-front war with the Habsburg–Persian alliance.

Transylvanian gains after the Peace of Nikolsburg

The next two years were relatively peaceful, although Bethlen was allowed to negotiate treaties with pro-Ottoman states. In preparation for entering the Thirty Years' War in Northern Germany, Denmark–Norway agreed an anti-Habsburg alliance with the Dutch Republic and England. This included military backing and financial subsidies for Bethlen, but in December 1626 the latter made peace with Emperor Ferdinand and exited the war.

The region remained largely peaceful until the Ottoman-Persian War ended in 1639, inspiring new diplomatic efforts by the anti-Habsburg coalition. In 1644, France and Sweden backed George I Rákóczi's invasion of Hungary. However, changes in Ottoman foreign policy led to the 1645 Treaty of Linz, which made peace between Transylvania and Austria, and ended their involvement in the war.

== Polish–Swedish rivalry and the Thirty Years' War (1627–1635) ==
The most prominent eastern conflict connected to the Thirty Years' War was the long-running struggle between Sweden and the Polish–Lithuanian Commonwealth. The two powers were engaged in intermittent diplomatic conflict from the late 1500s until 1635 (with intermittent menace of warfare), overlapping with Gustavus Adolphus’s intervention in Germany. Swedish occupation of Livonia and later incursions into Prussia tied significant military resources to the eastern Baltic. Historians such as Robert Frost and Geoffrey Parker note that Sweden's commitments in Poland constrained its early operations in the Holy Roman Empire and influenced Gustavus Adolphus's initial reliance on German allies.

During 1627–1632, the plans for a Catholic Imperial Navy and a Spanish Baltic Fleet were attractive to the Polish–Lithuanian Commonwealth (a catholic monarchy that were commercial rivals of the Danes and at war with Sweden). After negotiations in Prague since 1627 between Gabriel Posse (from Poland-Lithuania) and Gabriel de Roy (from Spain), in December 22 of 1628, Sigismund III Vasa of Poland let Habsburg Spain to take over the Polish-Lithuanian fleet in Wismar, making a small Polish intervention to aid the Spanish Netherlands and Wallenstein against Denmark-Norway, England and the Dutch Republic, in exchange for a promise of future aid from Spain against Sweden in Prussia. However, due to internal conflicts of interest and leadership between Spain, the HRE, the Catholic League and Wallenstein (as also the effects of Spanish Bankruptcy of 1627), the Spanish-Polish navy was relegated to fighting against the Danish and Swedish fleets in small sporadic skirmishes on the Baltic Sea. Finally, the Danes destroyed the Polish shipyards of Gdańsk, and the Swedes captured on 1632 the complete fleet during their intervenion.

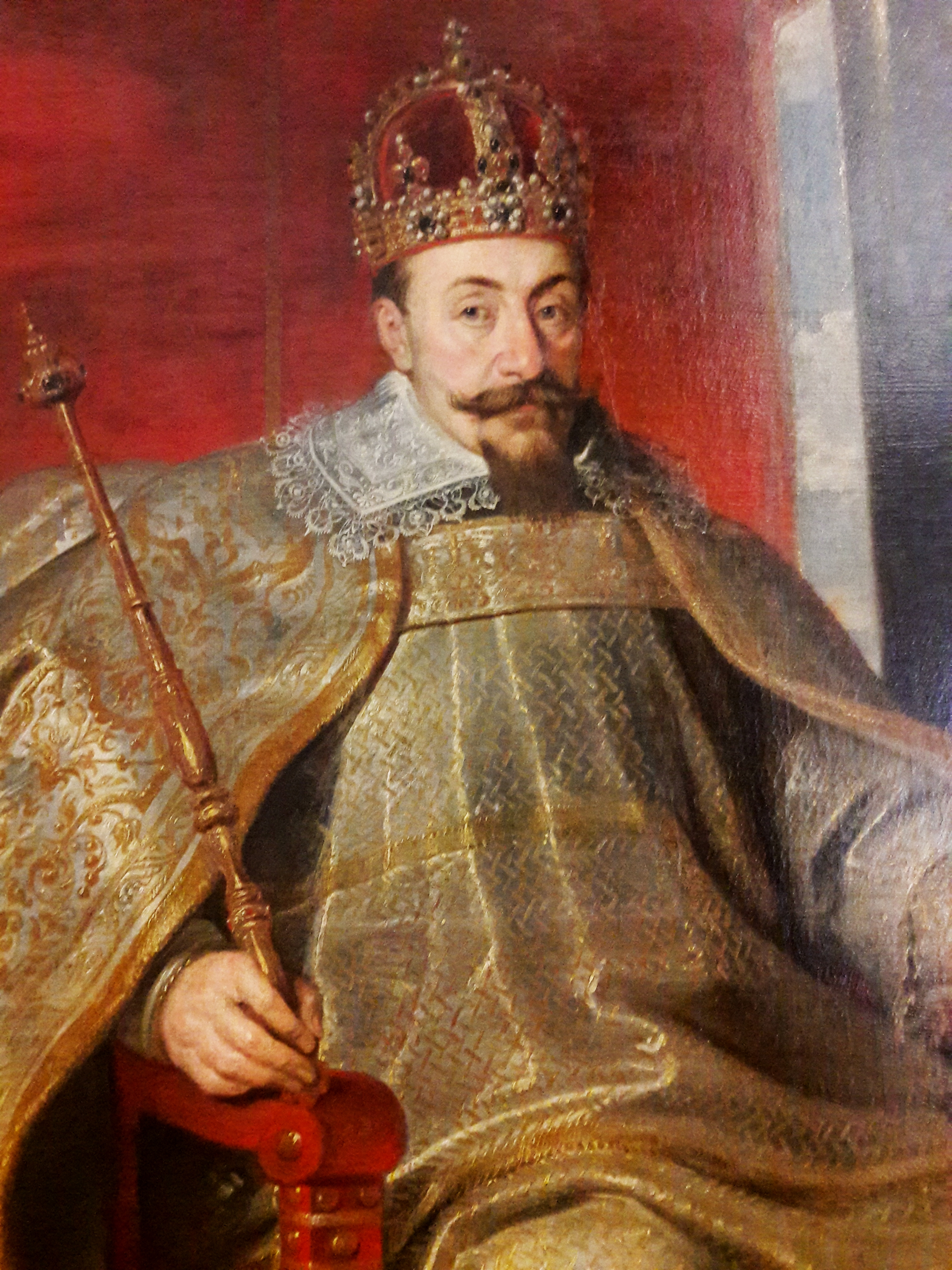
Sigismund III of Poland, a devout Catholic and strong supporter of the Habsburg cause in the Thirty Years' War

Nonetheless, due to this official alliances against common enemies from Northern Europe, Poland received help from Austrian Habsburgs on 1629, which sent to Poland two imperial corps (commanded by Johan Georg Arnim and Wallenstein) to fight the Swedes in the Vistula during the final phase of the 4th Polish–Swedish War, fusing both conflicts in a small scale. The Truce of Altmark (1629) granted Sweden substantial Baltic customs revenues, a major financial precondition for Sweden's large-scale campaigns in Germany.

=== Muscovite dimension ===
In response of the Habsburg-Polish association, there was a Franco-Dutch-Swedish diplomatic activity from 1627 until 1635—through their envoys Louis Deshayes, Cornelius Haga, Antoni Monier, Johan Müller, Paul Strassburg and Jacques Roussel—to make an Anti-Catholic coallition between Orthodox and Muslims through inviting Russia, the Cossacks, Crimea, Transylvania, Moldavia, Wallachia and the Ottomans to be allies of the Protestant cause (being interested the Patriarch Filaret of Moscow, Cyril of Constantinople, the Tsar Michael of Russia, the Prince Alexis of Russia, Abaza Mehmed Pasha of Bosnia and the Ottoman Caliph Murad IV), with the double objectives of giving more support to the German Protestants, and to gain allies in case the Polish-Swedish War re-started, as there was a serious possibility that Poland would enter on the German main conflict (alarming the Anti-Habsburg coallition, which did not want Sweden to be in a two-front war with Poland, thus affecting the German Campaign).

Although Russia and Poland-Lithuania did not send their armies to the main theater of the Thirty Years' War (the German conflict), both countries adopted unequivocal stances regarding the struggles in the Holy Roman Empire. King Sigismund III Vasa firmly supported the Catholic side, allowing Habsburg agents to recruit volunteers in Poland (mainly Cossacks), and also provided diplomatic support to the Habsburgs. Russia, on the other hand, took the opposite side, opening its state to Protestant merchants. Cheap agricultural products flowed in a broad stream to the Netherlands, Denmark-Norway, and Sweden; according to Chancellor Oxenstierna, Sweden alone received 7,000 tons of Russian grain through the port of Arkhangelsk. The Tsardom of Russia was largely preoccupied with the aftermath of the Time of Troubles and conflicts with the Polish-Lithuanian Commonwealth, leaving Moscow only marginally involved in Thirty Years’ War diplomacy, but with a strong Anti-Polish and Anti-Catholic stance to revenge the previous wars. During those times of 1630s diplomatic activity, the Tsar of Russia offered to Sweden the sending of an auxiliar force to help in the German main conflict after the defeat at Magdeburg, but was rejected the offer by the Swedes, suggesting to reserve those forces against the planned Russo-Turkish invasion of Poland-Lithuania.

The result of this Swedish intrigues were the Polish–Ottoman War of 1633–1634 (in which the Moldavian governor Moise Movilă continued his traditional family friendship with Poland, providing false information to the Sublime Porte), and the Smolensk War of 1632-1634 between Poland and Russia, which both served to distract Poland-Lithuania from German affairs and extended the Thirty Years' War to the Eastern borders of the Polish Lithuanian Commonwealth (in modern Belarus and Ukraine). Although Sweden planned to intervene directly in both conflicts to integrate the Anti-Polish coalition in the German war, the death of Gustavus Adolphus at Lützen provocated a big desorganization in the Anti-Austrian Coallition and paralizated the Swedish state. After winning both wars, and settling the 1635 Treaty of Stuhmsdorf with Sweden (the negotiations had the intervention of the Anti-Habsburg coallition, like France, England and Netherlands), Poland officially quit the Thirty Years' War in the diplomatic efforts.

An indirect effect of the Thirty Years' War for Poland was that Jewish refugees from German towns and principalities found a haven in the Polish-Lithuanian Commonwealth, which was more religious tolerant through Golden Liberty. This migration contributed to the demographic growth of Eastern European Jewry, which will experience a period of prosperity and relative security, leading to the development of Court Jews.

== Sources ==
- Bergin, Joseph; Brockliss, L. W. B. (1992). Richelieu and His Age. Clarendon Press. ISBN 978-0-19-820231-8.
- Cevrioğlu, M. Halef (2018). "Ottoman Foreign Policy during the Thirty Years War". Turcica, revue d'études turques peuples, langues, cultures, Etats (TURCICA 49). 49: 195–235. doi:10.2143/TURC.49.0.3285082.
- Kármán, Gábor (21 Oct 2022). "The Princes of Transylvania in the Thirty Years War". brill.com.
- Kármán, Gábor (2013). "Gábor Bethlen's Diplomats at the Protestant Courts of Europe". The Hungarian Historical Review. 4 (2).
- Mortimer, G. (2001). "Did Contemporaries Recognize a 'Thirty Years War'?". The English Historical Review. 116 (465): 124–136. doi:10.1093/ehr/116.465.124. ISSN 0013-8266. JSTOR 578766.
- Nagy, Zsuzsanna Hámori (2023). "A Special Form of Diplomatic Encounter: Negotiations in Constantinople (1625–1626)". The Hungarian Historical Review. 12 (2): 224–247. doi:10.38145/2023.2.224.
- Pálffy, Géza (2013). "Crisis in the Habsburg Monarchy and Hungary, 1619–1622: The Hungarian Estates and Gábor Bethlen". Hungarian Historical Review. 2 (4): 733–760.
- Silverana, Noemi (2023-01-01). "The Integration of Bohemian and Hungarian Aristocrats into the Spanish Habsburg System via Diplomatic Encounters, Cultural Exchange, and News Management (1608–1655)". The Hungarian Historical Review. 12 (2): 171–193. doi:10.38145/2023.2.171.
- Sugar, Peter F.; Hanák, Péter; Frank, Tibor (1990). A History of Hungary. Indiana University Press. ISBN 978-0-253-20867-5.
- Sutherland, N. M. (1992). "The Origins of the Thirty Years War and the Structure of European Politics". The English Historical Review. CVII (CCCCXXIV): 587–625. doi:10.1093/ehr/CVII.CCCCXXIV.587. ISSN 0013-8266.
- Szczesniak, Boleslaw B. (1968). "The Turkish Chapter Of The Thirty Years War : Partnership of the Polish and Imperial Forces as Documented in the Unique Pamphlet of 1621". Études Slaves et Est-Européennes / Slavic and East-European Studies. 12 (4): 226–231. ISSN 0014-2190. JSTOR 41055973.
- Teszelszky, Kees (2014). "The Making and Uses of the Image of Hungary and Transylvania" (PDF). Archived from the original (PDF) on 2021-07-27.
