= Chmielecki =

Chmielecki may refer to:

- Stefan Chmielecki (died 1630), Polish noble
  - Teofila Chmielecka (1590–1650), his wife
- Tymon Tytus Chmielecki (born 1965), Polish bishop and Vatican diplomat
- Witold Chmielecki (born 1966), Polish fantasy writer known by the pseudonym Feliks W. Kres
