= Battle of Paniowce =

Part of Polish–Ottoman War (1633–1634)

- Part of Polish–Ottoman War (1633–1634)
Date	22 October 1633
Location	Paniowce, Ukraine
Result	Polish–Lithuanian victory

Belligerents
Polish–Lithuanian Commonwealth	Ottoman Empire; Moldavia; Wallachia; Budjak Horde

Commanders and leaders
Stanisław Koniecpolski	Abhaz Pasha

Strength
About 11,000	About 24,000–55,000

Casualties and losses
Unknown	Heavy

Battle of Paniowce (also known as the Battle of Kamieniec Podolski) was a battle fought on October 22, 1633, near Paniowce in Podolia between Polish-Lithuanian forces and the Turks, supported by Moldavian and Wallachian troops, and the Buda Tatars. It took place during the Polish–Ottoman War (1633–1634).

== The battle ==
On October 22, Abaza Pasha attacked the Poles with all his strength. Before evening, during the battle. The Nogais and the Turkish cavalry unexpectedly rushed out through the valley of the Musza River on the Polish left wing and confused it badly, tore apart the camp with infantry guarding this flank, and broke into the rear of the troops. Koniecpolski immediately organized a counterattack and repulsed the attackers with a decisive action of the cavalry, infantry and artillery, inflicting significant losses on them. The entire battle ended in a Polish success. The enemy, repulsed on all sides, withdrew behind the Dniester.

== Aftermath ==
On October 24, Turkish troops led by Ipshir Mustafa and Aga Suleiman attacked the town. At that time, the well was a typical "palanka" surrounded by a rampart, a moat and a palisade, with 8 defensive towers made of wood. It was defended by several hundred Cossacks and local peasants, armed with a large number of firearms, but little ammunition. The first assault ended in failure and brought The Turks suffered significant losses. Among the dead was Pasha Kiajajeri, the commander of the Janissary troop from Adrianople. The next attack was also unsuccessful. Only after three days of fighting, when the defenders ran out of ammunition, the Turks. Abaza immediately sent the banner captured in Studzienica to the Sultan as a proof of victory.
