= Battle of Martynów =

1624 battle

Coordinates: 49.2172°N 24.5939°E

- Part of Tatar raids on the Commonwealth
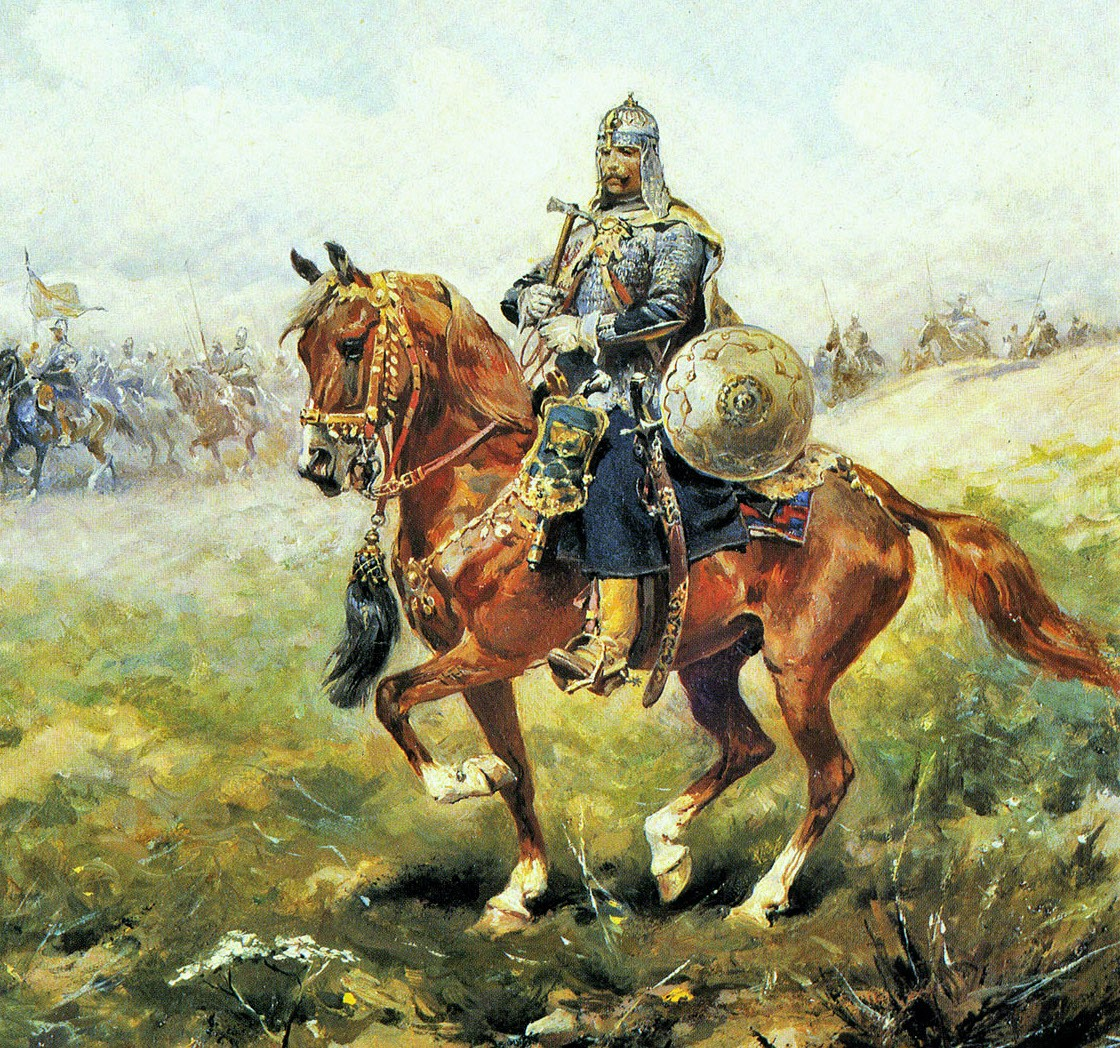
- "Towarzysz pancerny" - Polish-Lithuanian Commonwealth cavalrymen.
| Date | 20 June 1624 |
| Location | Martynów, in modern Ukraine |
| Result | Polish-Lithuanian victory |

Belligerents
| Polish–Lithuanian Commonwealth | Budjak Horde |

Commanders and leaders
| Stanisław Koniecpolski | Khan Temir |

Strength
| 5,000 | Unknown, likely outnumbered 15,000 (Contemporary claim, exaggerated) (Note: The total population of the Budjak Horde in the start of the 17th century, which was around 30,000-45,000, couldn't physically sustain such a massive army. Even a nation with 20% of their total male population as soldiers could only make up about 3 to 4,000 men. Add onto this that some of these forces have to be left back home in order to defend their own nation against Cossack raids and internal conflicts. Not even this total force of a few thousand men could all just join this one raiding party.) |

The Battle of Martynów of 20 June 1624 refers to the engagement between the Polish–Lithuanian Commonwealth forces under hetman Stanisław Koniecpolski and the Budjak Horde of the Nogai Tatars under Khan Temir. Koniecpolski defeated Khan Temir's forces near Novyi Martyniv (Мартинів). The victory at Martyniów was the biggest Polish victory over the Tatar raiders in a century.

== Background ==
In the spring of 1624 the Budjak Horde began to organize another raid into the Polish–Lithuanian Commonwealth borderlands. The horde, led by Khan Temir, approached the Commonwealth in May, and hetman Stanisław Koniecpolski gathered forces to stop it. However, his army was numerically inferior, so that at first he could only carry out delaying actions. By 13 January when he received intelligence that the horde had begun to turn back, he had about 5,000 troops: 600 hussars, 1350 registered Cossacks cavalry, 650 additional Cossack cavalry, 1450 other light cavalry, 350 infantry, 450 nobles from pospolite ruszenie, and several light cannons. This force included several notable soldiers and commanders, such as Stefan Chmielecki, Jan Odrzywolski, Samuel Łaszcz, Paweł Czarniecki and Stefan Czarniecki. He sent some forces, including mobilized peasants, to block possible routes of retreat for the horde, in order to force the horde to cross a river near the village of Martynów, where he planned to ambush them. The Tatar strength is unknown. Leszek Podhorodecki cites a contemporary diarist's estimate of 15,000, calling it a "gross exaggeration".

== Battle ==
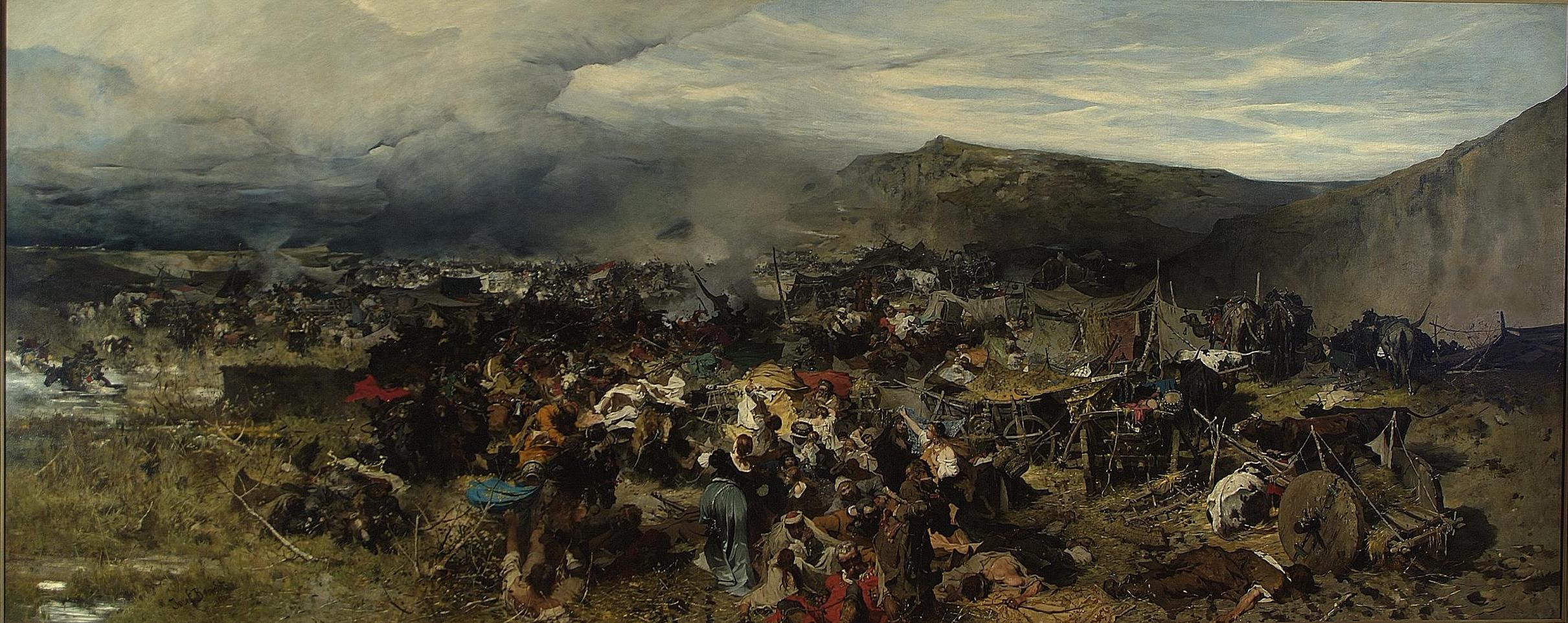
Freeing of the jasyr prisoners

Koniecpolski had to lay several possible ambushes, as Khan Temir was a savvy tactician, and would not fall easily into a trap. Eventually, he tricked the Tatars into attacking his lines, and after some feints by both sides, he managed to trick them into attacking a fortified tabor formation. In order to entrap Khan Temir, Koniecpolski created the illusion that his forces were retreating, abandoning high ground and leaving some scattered wagons with supplies, suggesting disorder. The Tatar attack was absorbed by the Polish cavalry, and a bloody battle ensued, which after about an hour caused the Tatars to break off. Koniecpolski's then pursued them, before withdrawing again, this time luring Tatars into the artillery fire of the tabor formation. This was followed by the charge of all 12 chorągiews of Polish cavalry. In the ensuing retreat, many Tatars drowned in the Dniestr river or nearby muds, and Khan Temir was wounded. Polish forces pursued the fleeing Tatars, and were able to free most of the slaves the Tatars had captured (jasyr). The Polish pursuit ended on the night of 20 to 21 June.

== Aftermath ==
The victory at Martyniów was a major success for Koniecpolski, as it was the biggest Polish victory over the Tatar raiders in a century. At the same time, Khan Temir lost some influence among the Tatars.
