= Mehmed III Giray =

Ruler of the Crimean Khanate (1584–1629)

Khan of the Tatar Crimean Khanate
- Reign: 1623–1628
- Predecessor: Canibek Giray
- Successor: Canibek Giray
- Born: 1584
- Died: 1629 (aged 44–45)
- Dynasty: Giray dynasty
- Religion: Islam

Mehmed III Giray (Note: Crimean Tatar, Ottoman Turkish and Persian: محمد کرای ثالث) (1584–1629, reigned 1623–1628) was a khan of the Crimean Khanate. Much of his life was spent in conflict with nearly everyone around him. Part of the trouble was caused by his over-aggressive brother Shahin Giray. His reign was marked by an unsuccessful Turkish attempt to expel him and by the first treaty between Crimea and the Zaporozhian Cossacks. He was driven out by the Turks in 1628 and died trying to regain his throne.

His name in Crimean Tatar is (Crimean Tatar: III Mehmed Geray, ٣محمد كراى).

== 1584–1601 Early life ==
His grandfather, khan Mehmed II Giray the fat, was one of the many sons of Devlet I Giray. In 1584 Mehmed II was driven from the throne and killed. A few months later Mehmed's son Saadet II Giray invaded, made himself khan and was driven out. He fled to the Kumyks on the Caspian Sea and died in Astrakhan around 1588, allegedly poisoned by the Russians. Saadet's sons, in order by age, were Devlet, Mehmed and Shahin Giray.

Around 1594, during the reign of Gazi II Giray, Mehmed arrived in Crimea along with his two brothers and mother. At some point his elder brother Devlet became nureddin. In 1601 Devlet conspired against Gazi. The plot was detected, Devlet was killed and Mehmed and Shahin fled. A few months later Gazi's brother Selyamet came under suspicion and fled. The three went to Turkey.

== 1601–1608 First exile ==
Gazi demanded Selyamet back, but the sultan exiled him to Anatolia. He and Mehmed joined the Celali rebellions. Around 1603 they and the rebels were pardoned but soon the brothers were imprisoned in Yedikule Fortress for some reason. Gazi II died in 1607 and passed the throne to his son Tokhtamysh. The Turks rejected this, released Selyamet from prison and appointed him khan. He chose Mehmed his kalga.

== 1608–1610 Conflict with Khan Selyamet ==
Mehmed set out overland to Crimea with a group of janissaries. On the road he met Tokhtamysh and killed him. Selâmet I Giray arrived by boat a little later. A few weeks later Mehmed's brother Shahin arrived from Circassia and was made nureddin (third in rank after khan and kalga). In 1609 Mehmed and Shahin conspired against Selyamet. They were informed on by Janibek and Khan Selyamet planned to kill them. The brothers also had informants and fled to the Caucasus. Janibek became kalga. The brothers gathered troops and Selyamet asked for help from the Turks. Instead of soldiers they sent a diplomat called Rizvan Pasha. Rizvan reconciled the three and the brothers were restored to their previous positions. While returning to Crimea they learned that Selyamet had died of natural causes. The brothers continued to Bakhchysarai and proclaimed themselves khan and kalga. (For whatever reason this is not included in the standard list of reigns. If it were, this would count as Mehmed's first reign in between Selyamet and Janibek's first reign.) Janibek fled to Rizvan Pasha at Kaffa. Mehmed demanded that Janibek be sent back and Rizvan refused, saying that Mehmed was not a legal khan until he was confirmed the sultan. Mehmed sent a man called Hadji-Koy to Istanbul with bribes. There he found that Janibek had already bribed the major politicians, so he transferred his bribes to the winning side. (In 1626 Mehmed caught Haji-Koy in Akkerman and hung him.) Sultan Ahmed I made Janibek khan and sent eight galleys and troops to Kaffa. Mehmed and Shahin fled to the steppes. Hearing that the Turkish troops were leaving they invaded Crimea and were soundly defeated by the remaining janissaries. They fled to Budjak.

== 1610–1623 Second exile ==
Shahin remained in Budjak and became a raider until the Turks drove him out. Mehmed went to Turkey where he gained the support of a politician named Nasuh Pasha. Nasuh planned to present him to the sultan while the sultan was hunting. The story goes that during the hunt the sultan drew his bow to kill a roe deer when the deer was struck by someone else's arrow. Mehmed followed the result of his well-aimed shot and came face to face with the sultan. Nasuh's enemies suggested that this might have been an assassination attempt. Nasuh fell from power and was executed in 1614. Mehmed was sent to the Yedikule prison for a second time. In February 1618 Mehmed escaped, was captured on the Bulgarian coast and exiled to the isle of Rhodes where he was well-treated. Here he gained the support of a politician called Mere Hüseyin Pasha. In February 1623, Mere Huseyin became vizier. He released Mehmed and made him khan to replace the incompetent Janibek. He arrived at Kaffa on 19 May 1623 and Janibek fled.

Places mentioned
Polish claims extended east to Zaporozhia
= Turkish

== 1623 First year of reign ==
His first task was to deal with Khan Temir and the Budjak Horde. Turkey and Poland had just made peace, but Khan Temir continued raiding since that was how he made his money. Mehmed led the whole Crimean army west and somehow talked Khan Temir into withdrawing east to the Syut-Su River (location?). Despite the peace the Zaporozhians raided Crimea and almost reached the capital. In revenge the Mansur bey raided Poland and took so many captives that prices on the slave market collapsed. Mehmed proved a stronger ruler than his predecessor Janibek, which caused hostility among the nobility.

Places in Crimea; Bakhchysarai was the Crimean capital.
= Turkish

== 1624 Attempted overthrow ==
Huseyin Pasha lost power in August 1623. Murad IV became sultan. A eunuch named Mustafa supported Janibek against Mehmed. Sensing the change in Istanbul, the beys began complaining to the Turks. One of their complaints was that the Don Cossacks had just raided Crimea and Mehmed did not stop them. Mehmed was told to lead an army to Persia and he refused, saying that he had to defend Crimea against the Zaporozhians.

In the spring of 1624 the sultan deposed Mehmed in favor of Janibek. In May 1624 Mehmed's brother Shahin Giray arrived from Persia and became kalga. The nureddin was Devlet Choban-Giray. The brothers decided to resist. Shahin had a number of beys executed while courting the common people. They began to collect troops from the Nogais, Circassians and Kumyks. A group of Zaporozhians who had been captured after their boats were washed up on shore by a storm were offered their freedom if they would fight for Mehmed. Otherwise they would be sold to the Turks as galley slaves. The beys were placed under Mehmed and their sons under Shahin. They were told that if the beys deserted to Janibek their sons would be hanged and the reverse.

On 3 June Janibek landed at Kaffa with 12 galleys and found his way blocked by Shahin. When Mehmed refused to yield the Turks sent 40 more ships and janissaries under Kapudan Pasha Rejeb Pasha. Neither side chose fight and the siege dragged on. In late July 100 Cossack boats entered the Bosphoros and raided the outskirts of Istanbul. The area was almost defenseless because the main fleet was away in Crimea. The Turks assembled what boats they could and after a 3-day standoff the Zaporozhians left. From prisoners the Turks learned that the Cossacks were in contact with Mehmed. Rejeb Pasha was ordered to clean things up and bring the fleet back to Istanbul.

On 11 August Rejeb Pasha marched out of Kaffa with about 10000 soldiers and the cannon he had removed from the boats and fortress walls. He marched for three days without opposition until, near Qarasuvbazar, he came to a line of earth-filled barrels that the Zaporozhians had set up. The Cossacks began firing and the Turks were cut down because they had not brought entrenching tools. Soon they were surrounded by Crimean cavalry. That night Rejeb realized his defeat and planned to recognize Mehmed as khan. Learning of this, Janibek fled. His flight provoked a rout. Abandoning their cannon, the janissaries were chased back to Kaffa. Shahin Giray burst in to Kaffa since the fort no longer had guns. Mehmed carefully held back since entering Kaffa would be an invasion of Turkish territory. Rejeb fled to a boat in the harbor and began negotiations. It was agreed that Mehmed would remain khan and that he would withdraw from Kaffa. The sultan would pretend that the Turkish invasion was unauthorized. A few weeks later a boat arrived with a decree confirming Mehmed's title. On 5 September a festival was held at Kaffa marking Mehmed's re-accession. He entered Kaffa not as a conqueror but as a guest.

== 1625–1627 ==
Shahin and the Poles: Mehmed was careful not to antagonize the Turks unnecessarily, but his brother was more aggressive. He disliked the Turkish policy of deposing khans and the use of Crimean troops in distant Turkish wars. While still in Kaffa Shahin sent a letter to the Polish king proposing a Crimean-Polish-Zaporozhian alliance against Turkey. Apparently Crimean-Nogai raiding would be directed against Moscow. In return he asked for lead and gunpower. The Poles were noncommital. He went north to meet the Zaporozhians bearing rich gifts and the captured Cossacks who had fought for him. On 3 January 1625 Crimea and Zaporozhia made an alliance. This was apparently the first time the Cossacks had made a treaty as if they were an independent state. In the fall on 1625 Stanisław Koniecpolski led an army to Zaporozhia. The Cossacks submitted, but remained difficult to control.

In order to break Shahin's plan, Istanbul ordered Mehmed to attack Poland. Starting in January 1626 a Crimean-Budjak army plundered some 200 villages in Volhynia and Galicia and withdrew before Koniecpolski and Stefan Chmielecki could bring up troops. Shahin not only opposed the campaign but also informed Koniecpolski. A later raid by Khan Temir and the nureddin Azamat Giray was defeated by Chmielecki and the Cossack Mykhailo Doroshenko.

Khan Temir: In 1624, Khan Temir returned to Budjak when he heard of Mehmed's deposition. He led a raid into Polish territory and was defeated by Koniecpolski. Shahin lead an army east to bring him under control. Temir's nobles convinced him that their position was untenable, so the Budjak Horde moved back east after burning everything they could not carry.

In early 1627 Mehmed led 10000 Crimeans and Budjaks east to deal with some Besleney who had stopped paying tribute. Shahin and Khan Temir stayed in Crimea. In the mountains he conversed with his Circassian father-in-law. As he left some Budjak mirzas slipped away and murdered Mehmed's father-in-law who in 1622 had killed the uncle of Khan Temir. Mehmed assumed that this could not have happened without the consent of Khan Temir, so he sent a messenger to Shahin ordering him to be arrested. Khan Temir learned of it and fled to the steppe. Shahin rounded up Temir's relatives and threatened to kill them if Temir did not return. He refused and the threat was carried out. The brothers had now made a dangerous enemy. Temir offered his services to the Turks.

== 1628 Overthrow ==
There was now a possibility that Crimea would be attacked by Khan Temir from the land and the Turks by sea. Janibek appeared offering to lead the Crimean army to Persia if he were made khan. Mehmed offered major concessions to Istanbul, but this did not work. The Turks began supplying Khan Temir. They ordered Mehmed to attack Poland, planning to land Janibek while he was away. In March 1628 Shahin set out toward Poland while in fact planning to attack Khan Temir. He marched along the coast and through Budjak to Dobrudja with Khan Temir falling back all the way. At the village of Babadag near the Danube delta he met some Budjak troops. He attacked, the Budjaks fled and he chased them into the woods where he found himself surrounded by Khan Temir. Only Shahin and a few friends managed to break out.

Shahin reached Bakhchysarai on 3 May 1628. A few days later the Budjaks burst into Crimea. Much of the Crimean army had been lost at Babadag. The mansur clan and the nureddin Azamat Giray went over to Khan Temir. The brothers with a few hundred men fled to the ancient rock-fort of Chufut-Kale. (circa 10 may) The place could not be stormed so Khan Temir settled down for a siege. Four weeks later 4000 Zaporozhian Cossacks under Mykhailo Doroshenko burst into the peninsula. At first Khan Temir thought that they were merely raiding, but he was quickly disabused. He abandoned the siege and on 31 May he was defeated on the Alma River. Doroshenko was killed, Khan Temir was wounded, Azamat Giray fled to Akkerman and the brothers left Chufut-Kale to meet their new friends. A Cossack banner was hoisted over the walls of Bakhchysarai.

Mehmed spent almost three weeks gathering troops. Khan Temir fled to Kaffa. Since he had an order from the sultan telling Ottoman officials to help him, the gates of Kaffa were opened. The place soon filled with Budjak warriors, their families, yurts, carts and cattle. Mehmed besieged Kaffa. Khan Temir attacked them, was defeated and barely got back through the gates. His son was captured and was executed while Khan Temir watched from the walls. Crimean forces rounded up the Budjak warriors who had not reached Kaffa. Shahin wanted to storm the town before a Turkish fleet arrived, but Mehmed held him back, not wishing to provoke the Turks.

After a delay dozens of Turkish Galleys appeared at Kaffa along with janissaries and Janibek Giray. On the morning of 30 May Mehmed awoke to find that all of his commanders had gone over to Janibek. Mehmed fled to the mountains. Shahin fled to the Cossacks. Khan Temir could not defeat the Cossacks because they knew what would happen to them if they were defeated. The Zaporozhians drew back along the Arabat Spit, reached the mainland and went to Zaporozhia.

== 1628–29 Third exile and death ==
From the Dnieper Shahin began a correspondence with the Poles. He asked for 12000 Cossacks to reconquer Crimea. In return he promised that Crimean raids on Polish territory would stop. The Poles gave him much support, but kept it secret, fearing an open break with Turkey. They planned to claim that the Cossacks were acting on their own. The Cossacks were happy since recent experience made Crimea look like an easy target. About this time Mehmed appeared in the Cossack camp. He had slipped out of the mountains, crossed Crimea undetected and reached the steppe.

First campaign: In early November 1628 a Rada was held. Mehmed and Shahin promised each Cossack 10 zlotys for the campaign. If successful, they promised not to ask for Polish tribute, not to attack Polish territory and to liberate any Polish or Ukrainian slaves in Crimea. An army of 6000 Cossacks and 8000 Crimeans set out. There was trouble from the start. The Cossacks did not like a winter campaign. Shahin promised each man a sheepskin coat. Many Cossacks did not like the new Hetman, Hryhoriy Chorny. After crossing the Dnieper, Shahin asked them to hurry but they would not. Around 15 November they approached Or-Kapi, but found that Janibek, his brother Devlet and Khan Temir had gotten there a few hours before. (Or Qapi was the fort that guarded Perekop.) North of Or-Kapi was a large herd of Nogai cattle. Against Shahin's advice, the Cossacks decided to steal the cattle first. With the cattle driven to the rear they moved up to within cannon-shot of the fort and then stopped. Janibek thought they were preparing for battle but in fact they were quarrelling. The Cossacks decided to forget about Crimea and drive their valuable loot back to Zaporozhe. Shahin could not stop them. Khan Temir chased them as far as the Dnieper but accomplished nothing.

Second campaign: Shahin planned a new campaign in spring when the drift ice cleared from the Dnieper. Mehmed went east to bring troops from the Lesser Nogai Horde. Many Cossacks gathered, hoping for loot. By April, Janibek, Devlet and Khan Temir were guarding Or-Kapi. Hoping to get these troops away from Or-Kapi, the Cossacks sent 500 to 700 men to raid Crimea. They landed on the western coast, went through the forests and captured the ancient fort of Mangup-Kale which was weakly defended and used by the khan as a treasury. The local people drove them out. They were forced to throw away much of their loot, which enriched the local villagers.

On 18 May 1629 a rada was held at Zaporozhe. Each Cossack was promised 10 zlotys and a horse. After crossing the Dnieper the army found that there was little water. In the first battle they drove Janibek's men back to Or-Kapi at a cost of up to 1000 Cossacks. Janibek was worried because he was outnumbered, but scouts reported that there were rows of carts with barrels supplying the enemy. Khan Temir sent troops to destroy the water carts and now the allies were without water. On 30 May Khan Temir attacked. The battle was inconclusive, but toward the end of the day thirst began to take effect and many of the Cossacks wanted to go home. Mehmed now decided that he had lost. Not only that, but having twice lost, he could expect to spend the rest of his life as an unsupported exile. He slipped through the lines and told Khan Temir's men that he would surrender in exchange for his life. He returned to camp to extricate his Crimeans from the Cossacks. As they saddled up the Cossacks realized what was happening and tried to stop them. Khan Temir exploited the situation by attacking. Mehmed told the Cossacks that the approaching force were allies that he had called in, so the Zaporozhians opened their lines. The Budjaks broke in and in the melee Mehmed was killed, pierced by a Cossack pike.

The Cossacks fought their way back to the Dnieper, where Khan Temir abandoned the chase. They had lost one man in four. One hundred of Mehmed's men reached Zaporozhe and were released. Janibek lost about 6000. The Cossack hetman was beheaded and his head set up at Kaffa. Shahin Giray escaped with a few men. Mehmed's body was brought back to Crimea and buried alongside his father and grandfather.

== In popular culture ==
- In the TV series Muhteşem Yüzyıl: Kösem, Mehmed III Giray is portrayed by Kadir Doğulu.

== Source and footnotes ==
- Oleksa Gaivoronsky «Повелители двух материков», Kiev-Bakhchysarai, second edition, 2010, ISBN 978-966-2260-02-1, Gazi: Volume 1, pp. 367–371; Selyamet: V. 2 pp. 24–35; Janibek: v. 2 pp. 41–43, 50–51, 61, 64–66; Reign: v. 2 pp. 83–131; third exile: 128–131, 156–158, 161–164; father-in-law: 84,114: Haji-Koy: 33, 112

Preceded by Canibek Giray	Khan of Crimea; 1623–1628	Succeeded by Canibek Giray
