= Polish–Ottoman War (1633–1634) =

Conflict in eastern Europe

Polish–Ottoman War 1633–1634
- Part of the Polish–Ottoman Wars and Thirty Years' War in Eastern Europe
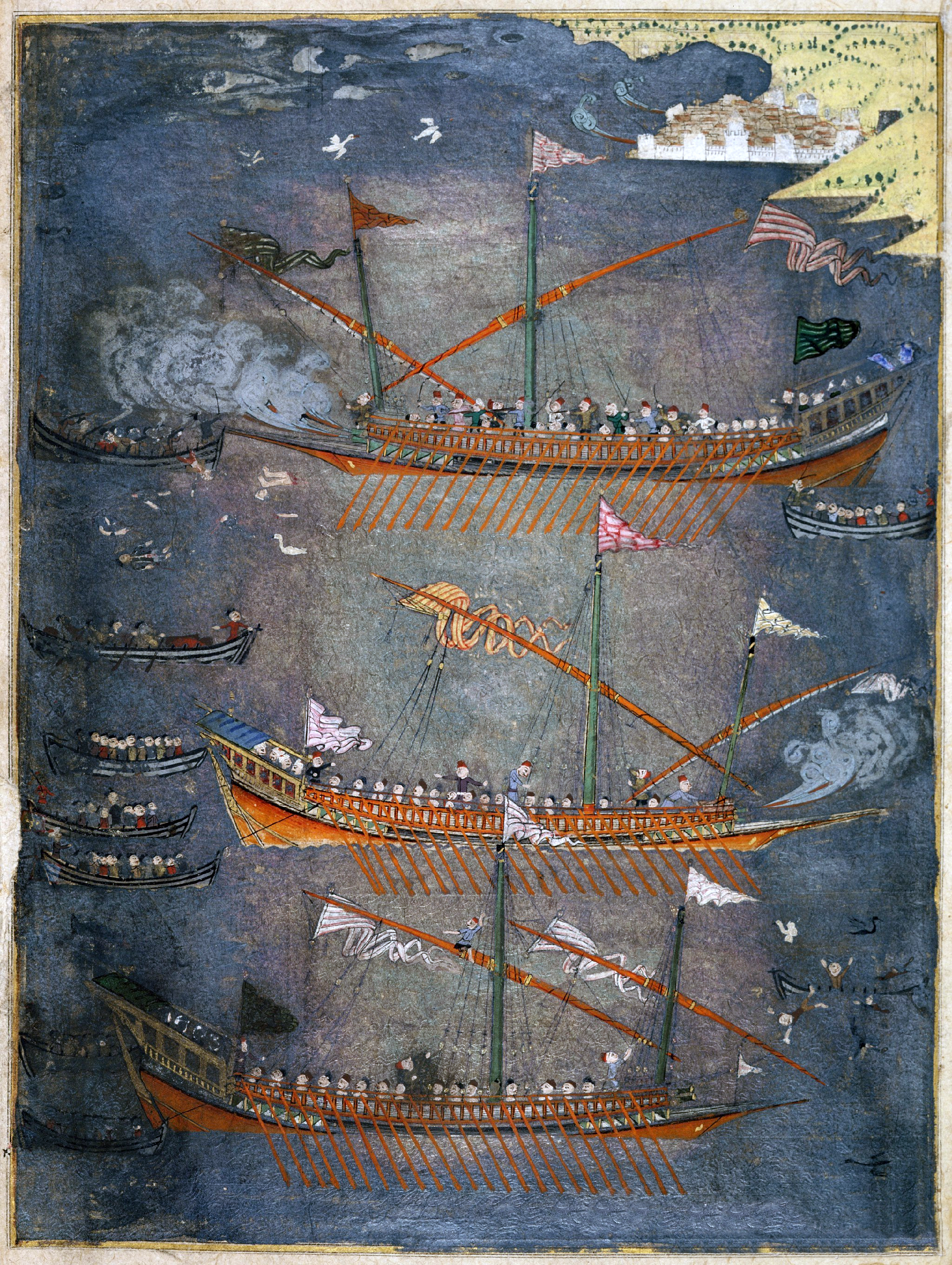
- Allied Zaporozhian Cossacks in chaika boats attacking Turkish galleys in the Black Sea, 1636
Date	1633–1634
Location	Polish–Lithuanian Commonwealth
Result	Inconclusive
Territorial changes	Status quo ante bellum

Belligerents
Polish–Lithuanian Commonwealth	Ottoman Empire; Moldavia; Wallachia; Budjak Horde

Commanders and leaders
Stanisław Koniecpolski	Abhaz Pasha; Khan Temir

The Polish–Ottoman War of 1633–1634 was a military conflict between the Polish–Lithuanian Commonwealth and the Ottoman Empire, fought primarily by the forces of the Polish Crown under Grand Crown Hetman Stanisław Koniecpolski.

In 1633, an Ottoman-led army commanded by Abaza Mehmed Pasha invaded Podolia but failed to defeat the forces of Grand Crown Hetman Stanisław Koniecpolski at the Battle of Paniowce on 22 October. In 1634, Sultan Murad IV ordered preparations for a larger invasion of the Commonwealth. Although substantial Ottoman forces were mobilised, the campaign was abandoned following diplomatic negotiations involving Polish, Ottoman, Habsburg and Transylvanian representatives. An agreement concluded later that year reaffirmed the existing peace and established mutual obligations concerning Cossack and Tatar raids.

== Background ==
Mehmed Abazy was the governor of the Ottoman province of Sylistria (Silistra, today in Bulgaria). In 1632, after the death of the Polish king Sigismund III Vasa, the Tsardom of Russia broke an armistice and started a war with the Commonwealth (Smolensk War 1632–1634). Abazy mobilized his troops and called Moldavian, Wallachian and Nogai Tatar (of the Budjak Horde) as reinforcements. Abazy was ambitious and possibly acted without the sultan's or the grand vizier's knowledge as the Ottoman Empire was deeply involved with a war against the Safavids (1623–1639). The sultan claimed ignorance of Abazy's actions but it's possible that sultan Murad IV secretly agreed to the risky campaign against the Commonwealth.

== 1633 ==
Around June 29, 1633 a strong Tatar group of the Budjak Horde (about 1,000 men) raided the area near the city of Kamieniec Podolski. This raid ended and the Tatars returned to Moldavia with their loot and slaves. Meanwhile, the Commonwealth commander, Hetman Stanisław Koniecpolski was in Bar and moved immediately in pursuit with 2,000 cavalry when the news reached him. The hetman crossed Dniestr river and entered the Ottoman-controlled territory of Moldavia, which had been the theatre of the previous Commonwealth-Ottoman war just a few decades earlier (the Moldavian Magnate Wars). The Tatars probably thought they were safe and slowed down thus allowing the hetman to catch up to them on July 4 near Sasowy Róg at the river Prut. Several dozen Tatars were killed and captured, the rest dispersed. Among the captives were several high-ranking Nogai Tatars and Khan Temir's son-in-law (Khan Temir, Kantymir – chief of Budjak Horde, a well known and ferocious Nogai Tatar leader). Most of the loot, all captives, cattle and horses were recovered.

Koniecpolski, who had an extensive spy network through the region and was responsible for much of the Commonwealth foreign policy there, had probably known about Abazy's plans at this moment. He returned to the left bank of Dniestr, started the construction of a fortified camp near Kamieniec Podolski (an important city and a strong fortress in the Podolia region) and called for reinforcement of about 3,000 regular troops in his disposition: Cossacks and private troops of magnates (about 8,000 men). Abazy started his march in the second half of September with Ottoman troops from his province, vassal troops and about 5,000–10,000 Tatars, including almost the whole Budjak horde led by Kantymir. In mid-October he was near Chocim (Khotyn) and learned about Koniecpolski's preparations. Abazy started negotiations, probably wanting to outmanoeuver Koniecpolski by diplomacy. It is possible that he got news about the sultan's increasing dissatisfaction, and decided to hurry his plans. Abazy crossed the Dniestr about October 20. Kantymir started his attacks on October 20 and continued during the next day. On October 22 Abazy attacked with his full forces but was repelled with heavy losses and ordered a retreat. It can only be speculated whether he got orders from Constantinople (Istanbul), if he did not believe that he could defeat Koniecpolski, or if he heard the false news that more Cossack reinforcements were coming to aid Koniecpolski.

== 1634 ==
In next year a full war with the Ottoman Empire was close (according to one source, the sultan created a huge army, while according to others, it was close to being formed); however the sultan suffered from another failure: his vassal, khan of Crimea Canibek Giray (also known as Janibek or Dzhanibek), had decided to attack Muscovy. Muscovite troops were fighting with Polish troops, then-Polish Ukraine was bolstered by Cossacks and Koniecpolski's troops, and many times Tatars themselves offered to the Commonwealth to raid Muscovy in exchange for “gifts” (or were sent “gifts” to do so). An army of Tatars, approximately 20,000 strong, attacked Muscovy in 1632, and again in 1633 in even larger numbers. Attacks continued until 1637. In June 1634, Tatars operated in the area of Kursk, Orel, and Mtsensk. A year later they attacked the Lesser Nogai Horde and Azov Horde. In 1636 Crimean Tatars attacked again and the Greater Nogai horde changed their allegiance to Crimea. The southern defenses were destroyed and the country was depopulated (the number of jasyr captives sold in Crimea is estimated at 10,000). Russian historians accuse the Poles of coordinating their attacks with those of Tatars.

Meanwhile, Commonwealth victories against Muscovy (Shein had been forced to capitulation near Smolensk in February 1634, while further plundering of Muscovite lands by Cossacks, the Commonwealth troops, and Tatars continued) caused the tsar to decide to seek peace with the Polish new king, Władysław IV. A new peace treaty in Polanowo (or Polanówko, called pokój polanowski in Polish) was signed in June 1634. The terms of the previous treaty were confirmed and in exchange for a large amount of money Władysław resigned the tsar title. After that Władysław went south with some of his troops to Ukraine.

In September 1634 about 29,000 Commonwealth soldiers were concentrated near Kamieniec Podolski. These included expanded regular troops of Koniecpolski (6,500 including Piechota wybraniecka), 5,500 infantry and dragoons that came with the king from Smolensk, private troops of magnates and mercenaries hired by provinces. Commonwealth forces were making preparations for war, the Smoleńsk campaign showing that the Polish infantry reform program had succeeded. New reforms in artillery were introduced, which resulted in creation of new centers of cannon-making, and additionally Cossacks could be mobilized. The whole situation changed dramatically: instead of opening a second front and attack on the soft belly of a desperate Commonwealth, the sultan would have to confront the entire power of a victorious king. In order to explain the previous year's “misunderstandings,” the sultan sent his envoy Chavush Shaheen aga to Warsaw, blamed Abazy, and promised to punish him.

The peace treaty was extended, and the sultan promised to displace the Budjak horde but never did so. Additionally Abazy was “relieved” and the new governor of Silistria received orders not to make any mischief.

== See also ==
- Polish-Ottoman Wars
- Smolensk War
- Ruthenia
- Zaporozhian Cossacks
