= Battle of Orynin =

1618 battle between Polish forces & Crimean Tatars in the Polish-Lithuanian Commonwealth

The Battle of Orynin took place on 28 September 1618. Polish forces under Hetmans Stanislaw Zolkiewski and Stanislaw Koniecpolski faced Crimean Tatars from Budjak, commanded by Khan Temir. The battle took place near Orynin in Podolia: after one day of battle, the Tatars bypassed the Poles, taking advantage of internal divisions within the Polish camp, and headed northwards, ransacking the southeastern corner of the Polish–Lithuanian Commonwealth. As a result of their raid, a number of towns and villages in Podole Voivodeship, Ruthenian Voivodeship, Braclaw Voivodeship, and Volhynia Voivodeship were burned to the ground and their residents taken into slavery.

== History ==
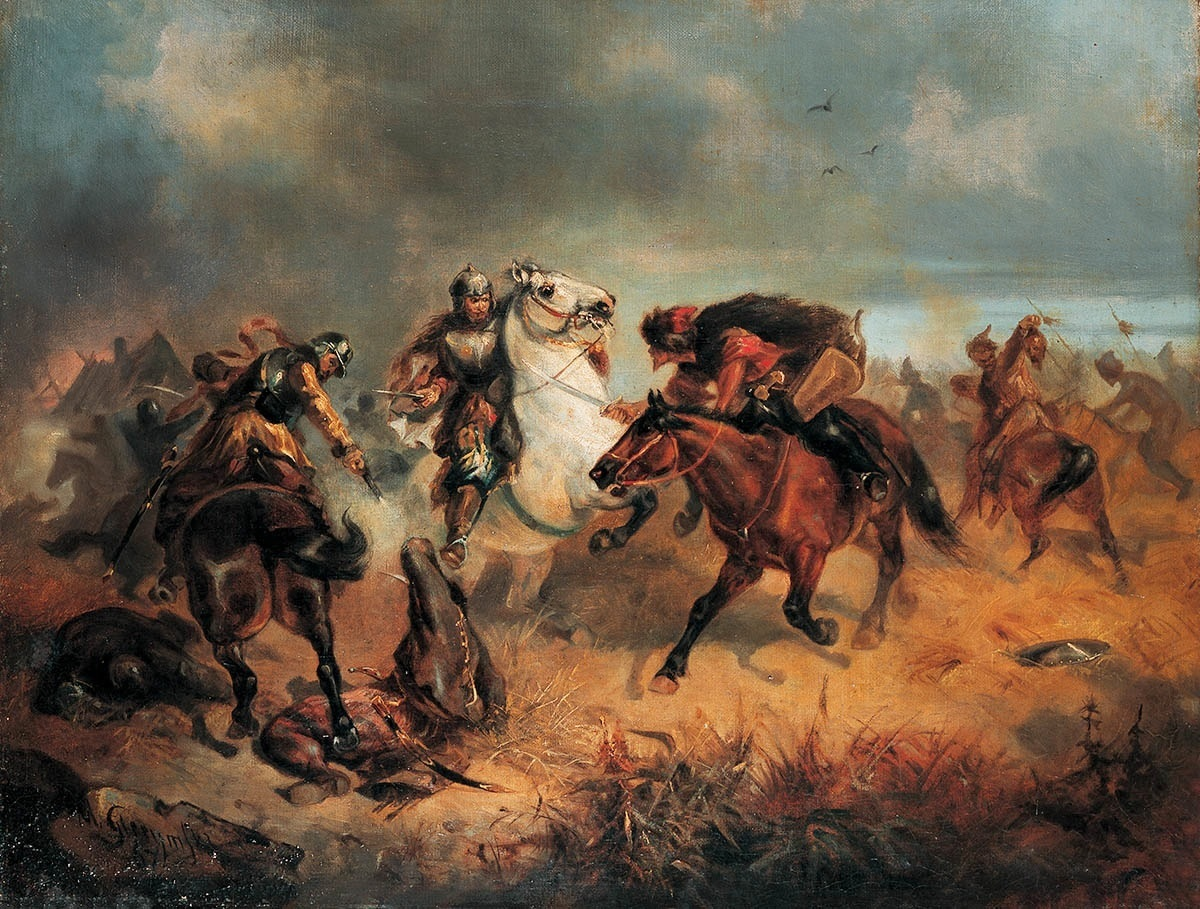
Skirmish with Tatars, by Maksymilian Gierymski, 1867

The Polish government was aware of Ottoman plans for an invasion of the Commonwealth. Apart from Crimean and Budjak Tatars, in spring 1618, the main Turkish forces concentrated along the border. To face the invaders, a Polish army consisting of pospolite ruszenie, wojsko kwarciane, and private units of magnates (a total of 15,000 soldiers) moved into Ukraine. The army camped in Orynin near Kamieniec Podolski.

Internal divisions within the Polish forces at Orynin had a negative effect. Magnates, who arrived with their private armies, did not want to obey the orders of the hetmans. As a result, instead of one large camp, three smaller camps were created:

- the hetmans’ camp in the center (5130 soldiers),
- Zasławski, Zbaraski, and Lubomirski families on the right wing (5200 soldiers),
- Zamoyski, Tarnowski, Ostrogski families, plus Zaporozhian Cossacks on the left wing (4800 soldiers).

In mid-September 1618, the first Tatar forces crossed the border: a 5,000-strong unit under Khan Temir, which, after crossing the Prut, entered Podolia. Next was a 10,000-strong unit under Canibek Giray, which entered Pokucie. On 28 September the Polish camp was attacked by both Tatar armies.

At first, the Tatars concentrated their efforts on the camp of magnate Tomasz Zamoyski. Hetman Stanislaw Zolkiewski, whose dislike of Zamoyski was well known, refrained from helping, saying aloud “First, he has to obey the old hetman instead of giving orders”. Finally, Zamoyski was saved by Janusz Ostrogski and Krzysztof Zbaraski, who sent several hundred well-trained riflemen.

On the next day, expecting a major battle, Polish forces united under Zolkiewski, and awaited the Tatar assault. Soon it turned out that the Tatars had left Orynin, and scattered over vast territories of the southeastern corner of the Commonwealth. The Tatars' mounted units ransacked the area from Sieniawa in the west to Jampol in the east. After capturing rich booty and thousands of men and women, the invaders returned to their homeland in mid-October along the so-called Black Trail.

== Sources ==
- Jerzy Besala: Stanisław Żółkiewski. Warszawa: PIW, 1988, s. 332-333. ISBN 83-06-01583-5.
- Paweł Nowatkiewicz: Orynin 28 IX 1618. Zabrze: Inforteditions, 2009, s. 38-43, seria: PB nr 9. ISBN 978-83-89943-35-4
