= Battle of Udycz =

Battle 28 January 1606 near the Udcyz River

- Part of the Tatar raids on the Commonwealth
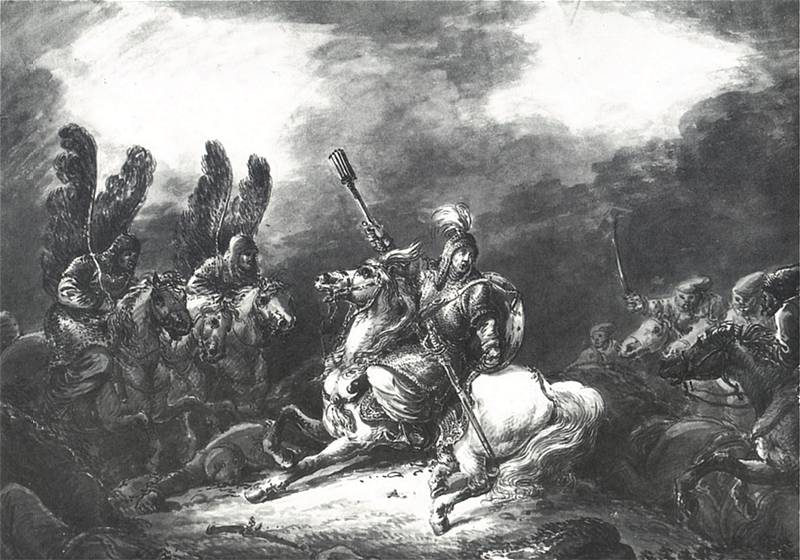
- Cavalry battle with the Tatars.
| Date | 28 January 1606 |
| Location | Udych river, today Vinnytsia Oblast (Ukraine) |
| Result | Polish–Lithuanian victory |

Belligerents
| Polish–Lithuanian Commonwealth | Crimean Tatars |

Commanders and leaders
| Stanisław Żółkiewski | Khan Temir |

Strength
| Almost 10,000 | More than 10,000 |

The Battle of Udycz of 28 January 1606 was an engagement between the Polish–Lithuanian Commonwealth forces under hetman Stanisław Żółkiewski and the horde of Crimean Tatars under Khan Temir. Żółkiewski defeated Khan Temir's forces near Udych River (Удич).
