= Khan Temir =

Steppe warlord and raider (died 1637)

Khan Temir (before 1594 to 1637) was a steppe warlord and raider. He ruled the Budjak Horde in what is now the southwestern corner of Ukraine (Budjak) along the Romanian border. Budjak is the southwesternmost corner of the Eurasian Steppe. He raided mostly along the eastern frontier of the Polish Commonwealth. Nominally a vassal of the Ottoman Empire, the Ottomans used him to pressure the Poles just as the Poles used the Zaporozhian Cossacks to pressure the Ottomans and Crimeans. His habit of acting independently caused problems. The Ottomans several times tried to move him east from Poland and eventually executed him. The most important event in his life was his conflict with the Crimean khan in 1628.

== Family ==
He was the first and greatest leader of the Bujak Horde which seems to have formed up about the time he came to power. A connection to the Cantemirești of Moldavia is likely, but cannot be established exactly. He was associated with the Mansur clan which held the northwestern steppe-like corner of Crimea and had connections with the steppe nomads. He is sometimes described as a Crimean Tatar, but this is not accurate. He traced his ancestry to Edigu (died 1419) and his son Mansur who was executed by Barak Khan in 1427. His grandfather was Divey-Mirza who was captured at the Battle of Molodi and died in Russian captivity around 1575. His father was Araslanay-Mirza who married a daughter of khan Devlet I and died fighting for khan Gazi II in Hungary around 1595. He had several sons who were killed during his lifetime.

== Life ==
=== Before Mehmed ===
His early life and rise to power need more documentation. In 1606 he led 10,000 men to raid Podolia and was defeated by Crown hetman Stanisław Żółkiewski at the Battle of Udycz.

In 1610 Janibek became Crimean khan and Shahin Giray fled to Khan Temir. Shahin was a successful raider until the Ottomans forced him out in 1614.

In June 1612 he led an Ottoman-Tatar army to Moldavia where he captured its ruler Constantin Movilă. The young Moldavian prince managed to escape captivity however he drowned in a river and died during his escape from the raiding Tatars. The period 1612-1617 needs more documentation.

In 1617 the Ottoman sultan Ahmed I sent an army north to force the Poles to limit Cossack raids into Ottoman territories. Instead of fighting they made the Treaty of Busza in which they agreed to halt raids by their Cossack and Tatar vassals. However the Cossack and Tatar freebooters ignored the treaty and continued their raids into each others territories. Next year Khan-Temir and his sons raided Galicia, Cossacks raided the Ottoman coastal port city of Khadjibey (modern Odesa) and in response the Ottoman sultan sent Crimeans and Khan-Temir to raid Volhynia (Battle of Orynin (1618)). The following years were a series of bloody battles fought between the Poles and their Cossack vassals against the Ottomans and their Tatar vassals.

Places mentioned
Polish claims extended east to Zaporozhia
= Ottoman

In 1620 the ruler of Moldavia switched his allegiance from the Ottomans to the Poles, leading to the Polish-Ottoman War (1620-21). The Poles were defeated at the Battle of Cecora (1620). Stanisław Żółkiewski offered to retreat if he could hold Khan Temir hostage until he reached the Polish border. Khan Temir refused. He retreated anyway, his army was chewed up by Khan Temir’s men and Zolkiewski was killed. The Budjaks then raided the surrounding country. Next spring they raided Galicia again. In 1621 the Ottoman sultan Osman II led a large army north supported by Khan Temir and Crimean khan Janibek. The resulting Battle of Khotyn (1621) was a stalemate with heavy losses on both sides. During and after the battle Khan Temir raided the countryside. For his services he was made governor the Silistra Eyalet along the Black Sea coast. (In July 1623 he was removed for unauthorized raiding.) During the negotiations for the Treaty of Khotyn around October 1621 the Poles asked that Khan Temir be moved away from their border, something that the Ottomans were not strong enough to do. Politicians like Mere Hüseyin Pasha wanted Khan Temir out of the way.

=== Under Mehmed III ===
In 1623 Mehmed III Giray became Crimean khan. His first task was to move Khan Temir from the Polish border to stop his private raiding after the Ottoman-Polish peace treaty. He led the Crimean army west and somehow talked Khan Temir into moving east to the Syut-Su river (location?). In 1624, when the Ottomans tried to remove Mehmed, he moved back to Budjak.

In 1624 he led a raid into Polish territory and was defeated by Stanisław Koniecpolski.

In 1624 or 1625 Shahin Giray lead a Crimean army east to bring him under control. Temir’s nobles convinced him that their position was untenable, so the Budjak Horde moved back east for the second time, after burning everything they could not carry.

Starting in January 1626 a Crimean-Budjak army plundered some 200 villages in Volhynia and Galicia and withdrew before Koniecpolski and Stefan Chmielecki could bring up troops. Later, Khan Temir raided Podolia.

In early 1627 khan Mehmed led 10000 Crimeans and Budjaks east to deal with some Besleney who had stopped paying tribute. Shahin Giray and Khan Temir stayed in Crimea. In the mountains Mehmed met his Circassian father-in-law. As he left some Budjak mirzas slipped away and murdered Mehmed’s father-in-law who in 1622 had killed Khan Temir’s uncle. Mehmed assumed that this could not have happened without Khan Temir’s consent, so he sent a messenger to Shahin ordering him to be arrested. Khan Temir learned of it and fled to the steppes. Shahin rounded up Temir’s relatives and threatened to kill them if Temir did not return. He refused and the threat was carried out. Mehmed and Shahin had now made a dangerous enemy. Khan Temir offered his services to the Ottomans.

In 1628 the Ottomans again tried to remove Mehmed, now with Khan Temir’s help. In spring Shahin made a preemptive attack of Khan Temir. Khan Temir fell back to the Danube delta, lured Shahin’s army into the woods and killed most of them, only Shahin and a few friends escaping.

In early May Shahin reached Crimea, followed by Khan Temir. Shahin and Mehmed fled to the ancient rock-fort of Chufut-Kale, which Khan Temir besieged. Four weeks later 4000 Zaporozhian Cossacks under Mykhailo Doroshenko burst into the peninsula. At first Khan Temir thought that they were merely raiding, but he was quickly disabused. On 31 May he was defeated by the Cossacks on the Alma River.

Khan Temir fled to Kaffa. Since he had an order from the sultan telling Ottoman officials to help him, the gates of Kaffa were opened. The place soon filled with Budjak warriors, their families, yurts, carts and cattle. Mehmed besieged Kaffa. Khan Temir attacked, was defeated and barely got back through the gates. His son was captured and executed. Crimean forces rounded up the Budjak warriors who had not reached Kaffa. Ottoman galleys landed at Kaffa, Mehmed was deserted by his men (30 June) and fled to the Cossacks.

=== After Mehmed ===
With Mehmed gone, Canibek Giray (Janibek) became khan for the second time (1628) with Khan Temir as a supporter. In late 1628 Mehmed tried to restore himself but was abandoned by his Cossack allies while Khan Temir guarded the entrance to Crimea at Perekop. In 1629 Mehmed tried again, and was defeated and killed by Khan Temir’s men.

In 1628 Khan Temir attacked the leaders of the Shirin clan. This caused so much hostility that he thought it best to return to Budjak. Janibek was glad to see him go. In the fall of 1629 kalga Devlet Giray and Khan Temir attacked Galicia in revenge for Polish support of Mehmed. They were defeated by Stefan Chmielecki and lost half their men. The period 1629-1633 needs more documentation.

In 1633 the Polish-Ottoman War (1633-34) broke out. In June about 1000 Budjaks raided Podolia and returned to Moldavia with their loot where Koniecpolski defeated them and Khan Temir’s son-in-law was captured. In September the Ottoman commander marched north with much of the Budjak horde under Khan Temir. In October there was a battle which the Poles won. In 1634 the Russo-Polish Smolensk War ended, which freed up Polish troops. The sultan had never been happy with this war which was mostly started by a local governor. Peace was made and the Ottomans promised to remove the Budjak horde. In the summer of 1634 khan Janibek assembled an army on the Dnieper to get this done, but the sultan changed his mind and ordered Janibek to attack Persia.

In 1635 khan Janibek was replaced by Inayet. In 1636 he was ordered to attack Persia. Since he could not make his nobles obey he expected that the Ottomans would remove him. He assumed that Khan Temir would attack from the north and the Ottomans would come by sea to Kaffa. He boldly determined to resist. He took Kaffa by surprise and in January 1637 led a large army against Budjak. Khan Temir was greatly outnumbered, so he told his men to make the best deal they could and fled south to Ottoman Kiliya where he stored his treasures and then on to Istanbul. Inayet sent his brother south to retrieve the treasure and then led the Budjaks east for a third time. At the Dnieper crossing they revolted, killed Inayet’s brothers and returned to Budjak.

In June 1637 an Ottoman fleet arrived in Kaffa and Inayet decided to give up and go to Istanbul. On 1 July 1637 both Inayet and Khan Temir appeared before the sultan. Inayet was taken away and strangled. Khan Temir was exiled to a governorship in Anatolia. Khan Temir was accompanied to Istanbul by his youngest son. The young man killed a man in a drunken brawl. The Ottomans beheaded him and sent his headless corpse to Khan Temir. The father could not resist strong language, so the Ottomans sent men to his house and strangled him, killing him on 10 July 1637.

== Source and footnotes ==
- Oleksa Gaivoronsky «Повелители двух материков», Kiev-Bakhchisarai, second edition, 2009, ISBN 978-966-2260-02-1, volume 2, under first Janibek, 1610: pp 48,53,57-60,63, 64; Mehmed III, 1623: 84, 105, 113, 114-127; second Janibek, 1628: 154, 155, 157, 158, 160-168, 173; Inayet, 1635: 205, 208, 210-211, 212-218.
- footnotes
