= Şahin Giray (prince) =

Crimean prince

Shahin Giray (c. 1585 – c.1641) was an exiled member of the ruling house of the Crimean Khanate.

Şahin was the son of Khan Saadet II Giray (reigned 1584) and the grandson of Khan Mehmed II Giray (reigned 1577-1584). His eldest brother was Devlet who was killed in 1601. His elder brother was the future Khan Mehmed III Giray (reigned 1623-1628). His mother was Es Turgan, the daughter of "Gazi Bey" (Mirza Kazi?) who founded the Lesser Nogai Horde around 1557.

== Life ==
In 1584 İslâm II Giray (1584-1588) came to the throne by expelling and killing Shahin's grandfather Mehmed II. Mehmed's sons Saadet, Murad and Devlet fled to the steppe. Three months later Saadet invaded Crimea, made himself khan and was quickly driven out. Saadet fled east, intrigued with the Persians and Russians and died in 1587, probably poisoned by the Russians. Saadet's sons, in order by age, were Devlet, Mehmed (Mehmed III) and Shahin

Under Ğazı II Giray (1588-1607): Around 1594 the 10-year-old Shahin, his brothers and mother returned to Crimea. By around 1600 Gazi's kalga was the future Selyamet I and his nureddin was Devlet, Shahin's eldest brother. (The kalga and nureddin were second and third rank after the khan.) In 1601 Devlet was involved in a plot against Gazi and was killed. Shahin and Mehmed escaped. Selyamet soon came under suspicion and also fled. The three went to Turkey.

Under Selâmet I Giray (1608-1610): After Gazi's death the Turks placed Selyamet on the throne. He brought with him Mehmed and Shahin as his kalga and nureddin. This was dangerous since he had fought their father and grandfather. They began plotting, Janibek informed on them and Selyamet planned to kill them. They learned of the plan and fled to the Caucasus. They gathered troops and Selyamet appealed to the Turks. The Turks sent a diplomat, Rizvan Pasha, to Kaffa. He worked out a deal by which the brothers would be restored to their original positions. While returning to Crimea they learned that Selyamet had died. Mehmed reached Bakhchisarai, made himself khan with Shahin as kalga. Janibek fled to Rizvan Pasha at Kaffa. Mehmed marched on Kaffa. Janibek's brother Devlet went to Istanbul and Mehmed sent Haji-Koy to Istanbul with bribes. Selyamet had already bribed the viziers to support Janibek. Haji-Koy decided to take his bribes to the other side. Sultan Ahmed I approved Janibek and sent eight galleys with janissaries to Kaffa. Mehmed and Shahin fled to the steppes. Learning that the Turkish troops were leaving, the brothers invaded Crimea. Only part of the troops had left, the brothers were soundly defeated and fled to Budjak.

Under Canibek Giray (1610-1623): The 25-year old Shahin accompanied his brother Mehmed from Budjak to Istanbul and then returned to Budjak. At this time, under Khan Temir, the Budjak Horde was actively raiding Poland. Shahin brought so much loot to his men that he became more popular than the inactive Janibek. In 1614 Janibek marched against him, but he evaded the khan's army. Returning to Crimea, Janibek learned where Shahin was hiding. He sent a second army which was also evaded. Eventually the Turks got after him and he fled to the Caucasus (1614). He did not dare stay since Janibek had friends in the region, so he went south to the Persians. At first the Persians suspected that he was a spy, but he gradually gained their trust. The Turks, who were then at war with Persia (Ottoman–Safavid War (1603–1618)), called Khan Janibek to fight the Persians. The campaign was a failure. The Turks blamed the Crimeans and the Crimeans blamed Shahin, accusing him of revealing Crimean secrets. Shahin was given charge of Crimean captives. He released the commoners. but was rather rough with the nobles.

In 1617, while Jannibek was away in Persia the Turks ordered Janibek's brother kalga Devlet to fight the Poles. Devlet had to hold part of his army in Crimea to guard against Shahin. It is possible that Shahin could have captured Crimea at this time if he had known about the shortage of troops. Around 1619 Shahin gathered troops from the Lesser Nogai Horde and planned to move on Crimea. Kalga Devlet sent a large army east and Shahin fled to the Kumyks.

Under Mehmed III Giray (1623-1628): When his brother came to the throne Shahin was in Persia. The Shah released him, guessing, correctly, that he would be anti-Turkish. He left Persia in late 1623, spent some time in the Caucasus and reached Crimea in May 1624. The Turks tried to remove Mehmed and Shahin was a major factor in the resistance. Shahin tried to protect Crimean independence by making an anti-Turkish alliance with Poland. In 1627 he made an enemy of Khan Temir. In 1628 he and his brother were overthrown. For a fuller account see Mehmed III Giray.

Under Janibek Giray, second reign (1628-1635) Mehmed and Shahin fled to the Zaporozhian Cossacks. In 1628 they returned with a Cossack army but the Cossacks fell to looting and abandoned the brothers to carry their loot home. In 1629 they tried again. This time Mehmed was killed and Shahin barely escaped with a few companions. He fled east to the North Caucasus, but the local rulers were afraid to help him, so he went south for a second time to Persia. The Shah welcomed him and offered troops, planning to push north of the Caucasus. Shahin made secret contacts with potential allies in Crimea and the north Caucasus. In the summer of 1632 Janibek found out and killed his agents. For some reason Shahin killed a Persian governor and was forced to flee to his father-in-law in Kumykia, taking with him a large amount of treasure. No one in the Caucasus dared to protect him so he tried the Turks at Azov. After various maneuvers he sailed from Azov to Kaffa to Istanbul (second half of 1633). Sultan Murad welcomed him and sent him to Rhodes where he might be used as a replacement khan.

Under Inayet (1635-1637) and Bahadir (1637-1641) In 1635 Janibek was overthrown and also exiled to Rhodes. When the 70-year old Janibek died in 1636 his treasures were given to Shahin. There seems to be little information about what Shahin did during his exile on Rhodes from 1633 to 1641. He began making contacts with friends in Crimea, something that Bahadir reported to the sultan. It is said that a certain stargazer predicted that great evils would be caused by a man with a bird’s name. (Shahin means 'falcon'.) For whatever reason, the sultan decided to execute him. To allay suspicions, he was invited to a feast by Nakkash-Mustafa Pasha, who was traveling by way of Rhodes to become the governor of Egypt. When Shahin arrived at the feast he was strangled.

== In popular culture ==
- In the TV series Muhteşem Yüzyıl: Kösem, Şahin Giray is portrayed by Erkan Kolçak Köstendil.

== Source and footnotes ==
- Oleksa Gaivoronsky «Повелители двух материков», Kiev-Bakhchisarai, second edition, 2010, ISBN 978-966-2260-02-1 Volume 1: under Gazi: pp 350, 351, Volume 2: Under Selyamet: pp 29–30, Janibek's accession: pp 30–35, under first Janibek: pp 44,45,49,51,52; Mehmed III: pp 89-131; Second Janibek: pp 155-158,175-179; Bahadir:pp 249-251.
