= Peace of Nikolsburg =

Peace treaty signed on 31 December 1621

The Peace of Nikolsburg.

The Peace of Nikolsburg or Peace of Mikulov, signed on 31 December 1621 in Nikolsburg, Moravia (now Mikulov in the Czech Republic), was the treaty which ended the war between Prince Gabriel Bethlen of Transylvania and Emperor Ferdinand II of the Holy Roman Empire. The chief negotiators of the treaty were Maximilian von und zu Trauttmansdorff and Nikolaus Esterházy de Galántha.

== History ==
To take advantage of Ferdinand's preoccupation with the Bohemian Revolt at the beginning of the Thirty Years' War, Bethlen invaded Habsburg-controlled Royal Hungary in 1618 and fully conquered its north until 1620. Although a peace was settled in January 1620 giving Bethlen 13 counties in eastern Royal Hungary, the prince resumed the war in September. Ferdinand's defeat of the Bohemians at the Battle of White Mountain in November allowed him to focus his forces on Bethlen, and the emperor was able to reconquer most of Royal Hungary by 1621. Because Bethlen did not distribute the confiscated property of Catholic noblemen to his Protestant noblemen as he had promised, they rescinded their support. These setbacks, as well as Bethlen's lack of support from the Ottoman Empire, led Bethlen and Ferdinand to seek terms in Nikolsburg.

In return for Bethlen's renunciation of any claims to the throne of the Kingdom of Hungary, Ferdinand agreed to observe the conditions of the Treaty of Vienna of 1606, which had granted full freedom of worship to Protestants in Transylvania and agreed on the summoning of a general diet within six months. In addition, Bethlen secured the (purely formal) title of "Imperial Prince" (of Transylvania), seven counties around the Upper Tisza River (in present-day Slovakia, Ukraine, Hungary, and Romania), the fortresses of Tokaj, Munkács, and Ecsed, and a duchy in Silesia. The treaty gave Ferdinand peace in the east and allowed him to focus his forces on subduing the Rhenish Palatinate.

The Peace of Nikolsburg was confirmed by the Treaty of Vienna in 1624 and the Third Peace of Pressburg in 1626.

== See also ==
- List of treaties
