= Peace of Pressburg (1626) =

1626 peace treaty

The third Peace of Pressburg (also known as Treaty of Pressburg) was a peace treaty concluded in Pressburg (then Pozsony today's Bratislava). It was signed on 30 December 1626 between Gabriel Bethlen of Transylvania, the leader of an uprising against the Habsburg monarchy from 1619 to 1626, and Holy Roman Emperor Ferdinand II. The agreement put an end to the revolt by confirming the Peace of Nikolsburg (31 December 1621). In return, Bethlen agreed not to fight against the emperor anymore, nor would he ally with the Ottoman Turks.
