= Teofila Chmielecka =

Teofila Chmielecka (1590–1650) was a military spouse in the Polish-Lithuanian Commonwealth, married to Stefan Chmielecki. She was known for her dedication to the military ideals and of maintaining the military Spartan life style necessary in the army, and came to be known as the ideal role model of a military wife. She displayed her personal courage on several occasions, and became known as "The Wolf of the Frontier".
