= Canibek Giray =

Khan of Crimea from 1610 to 1623 and 1628 to 1635

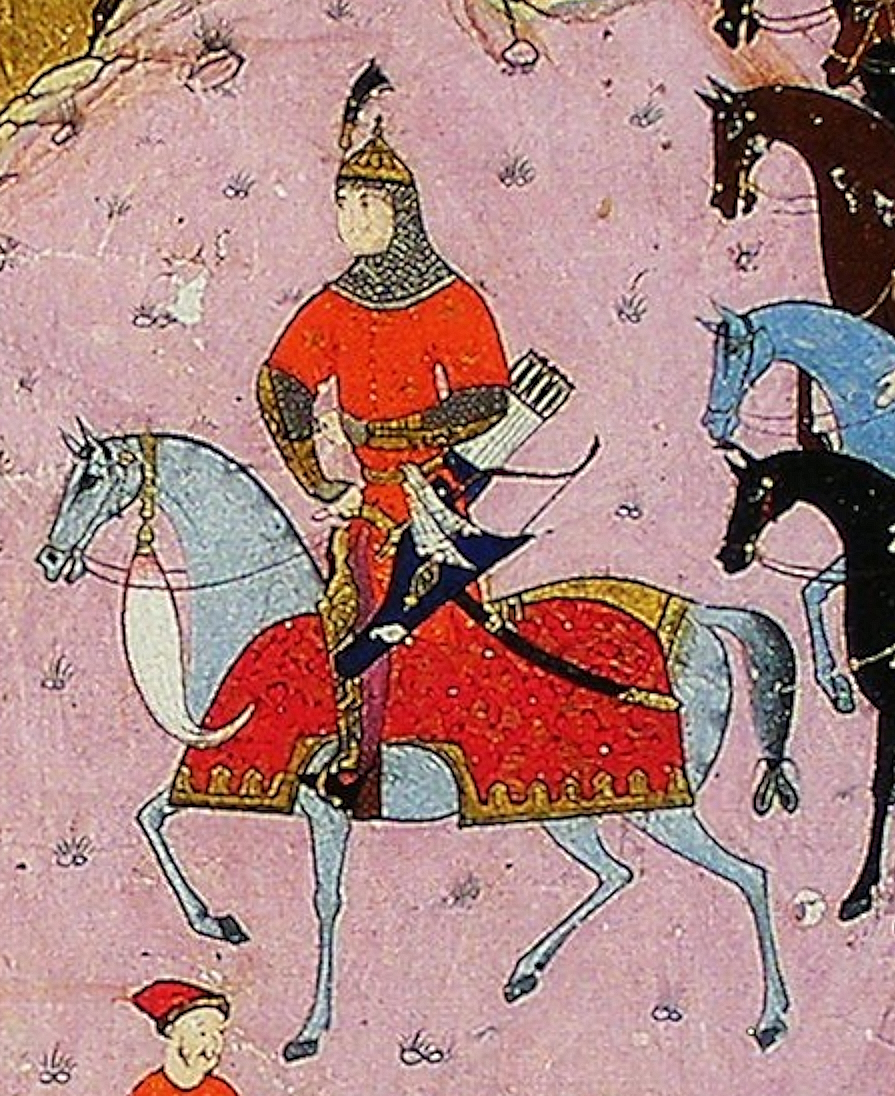
- Crimean Khan Janibek Giray (1610-1623 and 1628-1635). Şehname-i Nadiri (Nadiri's book of kings) (1620s).

Khan of the Tatar Crimean Khanate (1st reign)
- Reign: 1610–1623
- Predecessor: Selâmet I Giray
- Successor: Mehmed III Giray

Khan of the Tatar Crimean Khanate (2nd reign)
- Reign: 1628–1635
- Predecessor: Mehmed III Giray
- Successor: İnayet Giray
- Born: 1566
- Died: 1636 (aged 69–70); Rhodes, Ottoman Empire
- Burial: Rhodes, Greece
- Dynasty: Giray dynasty
- Religion: Sunni Islam

Canibek Giray (Note: Crimean Tatar, Ottoman Turkish and Persian: جانی بیک کرای) (1568–1636) was twice khan of the Crimean Khanate. He reigned from 1610 to 1623 and again from 1628 to 1635. During his first reign he fought for the Turks in Persia and Poland. He proved a poor commander and had difficulty making his men obey. He was removed by the Turks in 1623. In the following year the Turks tried to restore him and failed. During his second reign there were raids on Poland and Russia. The Turks again removed him and he died in exile.

Chronology: 1588: born, 1609: raids Muscovy, 1610: becomes khan, 1615: raids Poland, 1617: fights Persians while brother fights Poles, 1618: in Istanbul. 1621: fights Poles, 1623: deposed by Turks, 1624: Turks try to restore him, 1628: restored, 1635: deposed by Turks, 1636: dies in exile.

His younger brother was one of the many people named Devlet Giray. His father was Shakai Mubarek, one of the many sons of Devlet I Giray (1550–77), five of whom had been khans in the period 1577 to 1608. Since his father was not a khan he was not technically eligible for the throne.

== Early life ==
In 1588, on the accession of Gazi II Giray, Mubarak (Gazi's brother and Janibek's father) fled to the north Caucasus where he died in 1593. His widow married his brother Fetih I Giray who was briefly khan in 1596. During the reign of Selâmet I Giray (1608–10) Mubakek's widow Dur-Bike arrived in Crimea with her sons Janibek and Devlet. Selyamet married Dur-Bike and adopted her sons. In 1609 Selyamet's kalga and nureddin (the future khan Mehmed III and his brother Shahin Giray) conspired against him and were forced to flee. Janibek and Devlet replaced them. In 1609 and 1610 Janibek led significant raids against Muscovy and twice crossed the Oka. In late May or early June 1610 the 52-year-old Selyamet died.

== First Reign ==
=== Accession ===
Selyamet had arranged for Janibek to follow him, even though Mehmed (later Mehmed III Giray), being the son of a khan, had a better claim. When he died the brothers Mehmed and Shahin Giray invaded and made themselves khan and kalga. Jannibek fled to Kaffa, and appealed to the Turks. The Turks sent eight galleys with janissaries and Mehmed and Shahin fled to the steppes. Hearing that the Turks were leaving the brothers invaded again and were defeated by the remaining Turks.

=== Zaporozhian and Budjak raids ===
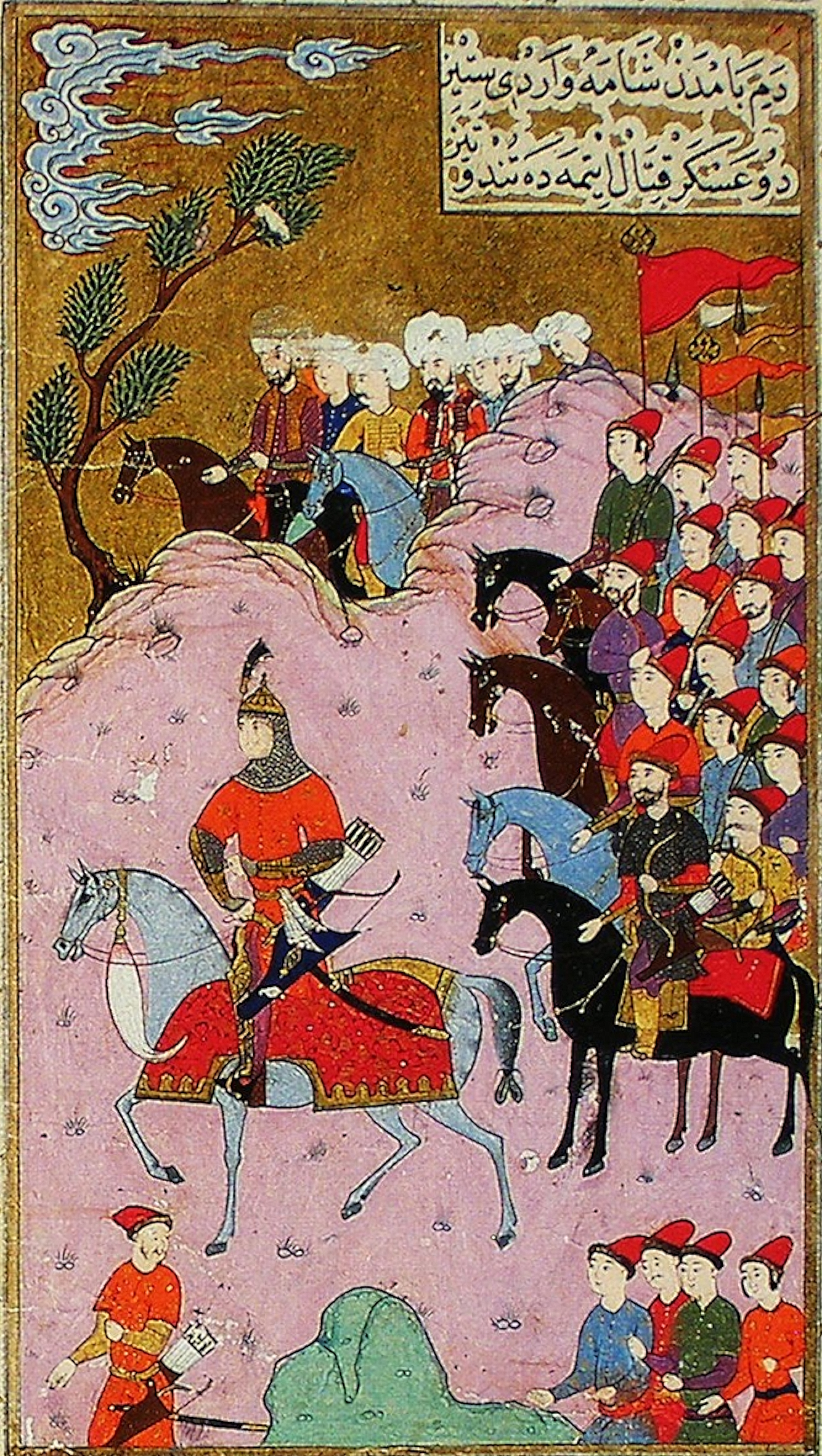
Army of the Crimean Khan Janibek Giray (1610-1623 and 1628-1635). Şehname-i Nadiri (Nadiri's book of kings) (1620s).

During the Time of Troubles many Zaporozhian Cossacks had been drawn northward, but when things settled down they turned southward in search of loot. Each year some 30 to 100 Cossack boats left the mouth of the Dnieper to raid the Crimean and Turkish coasts. In 1612 they raided Gozlev and next year attacked Crimea twice. In 1616 they burned Kaffa and later plundered Trazon and raided the Bosphorus coast. The Turks burned their camps on the Dnieper but could not catch their ships. (?) Around 1620 king Sigismund III Vasa tried to control the Zaporozhians by paying them (Registered Cossacks), but there was not enough money for this to work.

At this time the Budjak Horde under Khan Temir was unusually active in raiding Poland. When Shahin Giray was driven out of Crimea in 1610 he joined the Budjak raiders. He brought his followers so much loot that he became more popular than the inactive Janibek. Janibek sent two armies against him. In 1614 the Turks drove him out. The Budjaks later fought for the Turks at Khotin and elsewhere.

The Poles had little control over their Zaporozhian subjects and the Turks had little control over the Budjak Horde. Each power used their subject-raiders to put pressure on the other.

=== Fighting the Persians ===
Around 1616 the sultan ordered Jannibek to fight the Persians (Ottoman–Safavid War (1603–1618)). During his absence his brother Devlet was in charge of Crimea. Crossing north of the Caucasus he became involved with his son-in-law, Ish-Terek, Bey of the Great Nogai Horde. Ish-Terek had declared himself a direct subject of the sultan. Previously the Nogais had recognized the supremacy of the Crimeans just as the Crimeans recognized the supremacy of the Turks. He also proposed a Nogai-Turkish attack of Astrakhan, which the Turks refused. When Ish-Terek claimed to be the khan's equal, Jannibeg moved against him and Ish-Terek fled for protection of the Russian governor of Astrakhan. Instead of following him, the khan attacked his Kabardian allies. When he then tried to cross the passes of Dagestan to Persia he found them blocked by the Nogais, Kabardians and Kumyks whom he had offended. Seeing no way to break through, the khan returned to Crimea in shame.

The following year the troops were transported by ship across the Black Sea from Kaffa to Trabzon and then marched east across the Trans-Caucasus. The result was a disaster for the Turco-Crimean side. The begs of the Shirin and Mansur clans were killed, the khan's advisor Bek-Ata was captured and the Crimeans lost at least 8000 men. The Turks blamed the Crimeans and the Crimeans blamed Shahin Giray who was helping the Persians.

In late 1617 or early 1618 Jannibek went to Istanbul to explain himself. In the spring of 1619 he returned to Crimea

=== Fighting the Poles ===
In 1615 Janibek led a very successful raid into Podolia and Galicia. He claimed it was in retaliation for the Zaporozhian raids.

In 1617, while Jannibek was fighting the Persians, the Sultan ordered Janibek's brother Devlet to fight the Poles. Devlet tried to hold his troops back since he feared an attack from Shahin Giray. Many of his men slipped away to Poland, hoping for loot. It is possible that Shahin could have captured Crimea at this time if he had known about the shortage of troops. The Sultan planned a joint Turkish-Crimean-Budjak attack to force the Poles to rein in the Zaporozhians. Stanisław Żółkiewski brought up an army. The sides chose not to fight and made a compromise in which they agreed to limit the raids of their subjects (Peace of Busza). These promises had little effect since they had little control over the freebooters whom they claimed to rule. (?)

Around 1620 Moldavia revolted against the Turks (Polish–Ottoman War (1620–21)). Polish crown hetman Zolkievski entered Moldavia in September 1620. The Turks called in their Crimean and Budjak vassals. Jannibek stayed in Crimea for fear of Shahin and sent his brother Devlet. Devlet quarreled with Khan Temir. At the Battle of Cecora (1620) the Poles were at defeated and began to retreat. They were surrounded and defeated by Khan Temir. The Budjaks began a massive looting of Polish territory and were joined by the Crimeans.

Encouraged by this success, the Turks began the Battle of Khotyn (1621) in September 1621, aided by Janibek in person. The fighting lasted four weeks and was not decisive, but the Turks lost so many men that it discouraged further advance. The Turks were pleased with Khan Temir and displeased with Jannibek, who seemed reluctant to fight. Jannibek went back to Crimea but most of his men abandoned him and stayed to loot. The Turks began to consider removing him.

=== Turkish problems and deposition ===
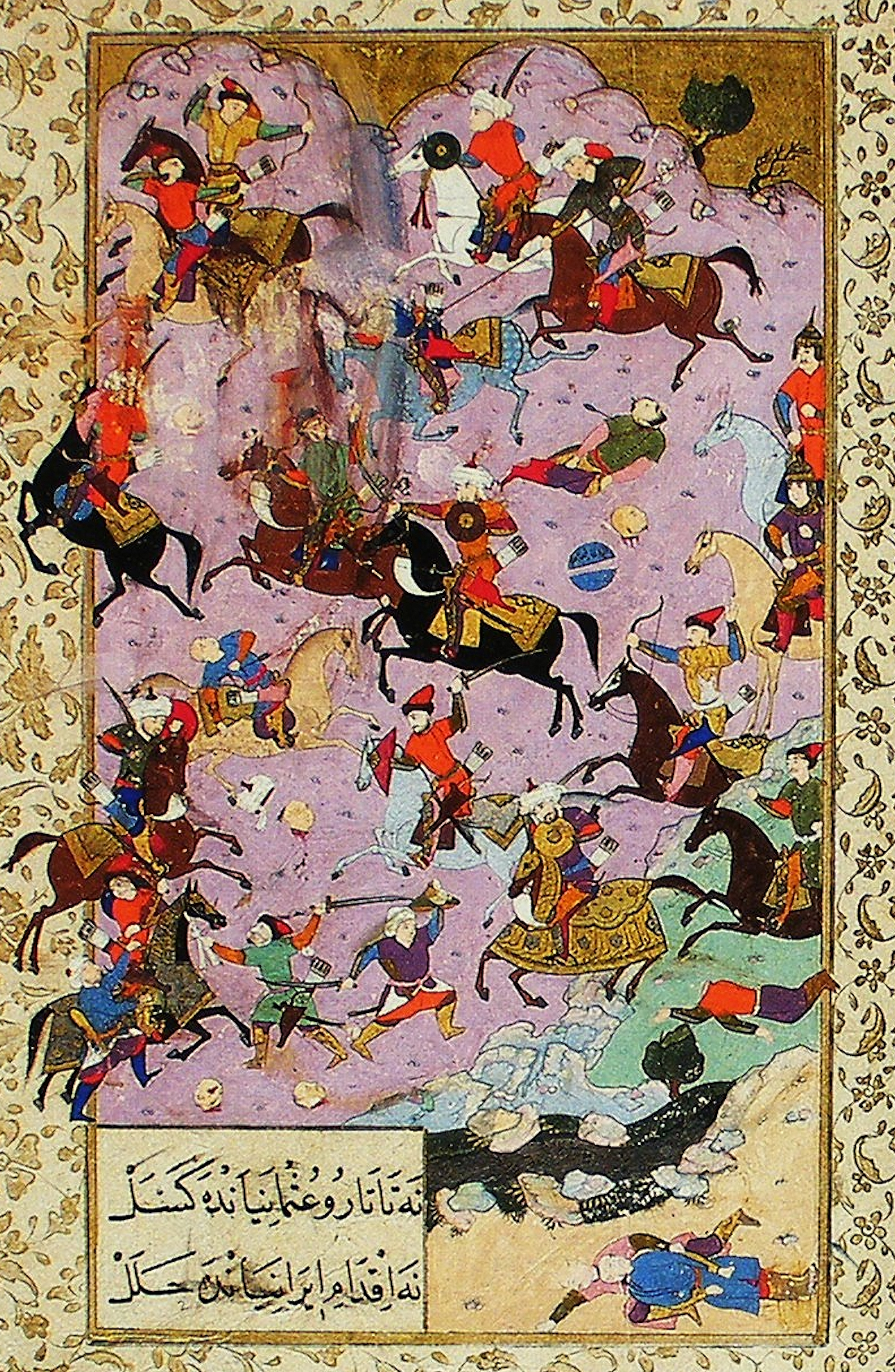
Crimean Khan Janibek Giray battle with the Persian commander Karchagai Khan in 1617.

His first Persian campaign was an abject failure. After his second Persian failure, in late 1617 or early 1618 Janibek went to Istanbul to explain himself. Here he was caught up in the confusion following the death of Ahmed I. This confusion and Janibek's absence led Shahin Giray to attempt an invasion of Crimea. When things settled down Janibek retained precarious Turkish support and returned to Crimea (spring 1619). In the 1620 Cecora campaign Devlet proved himself a better fighter than his brother. In the 1621 Khotyn campaign Janibek was reluctant to fight a pitched battle and wanted to spread his men out to loot. After the battle his men were turned loose to loot while Janibek went back to Crimea. Many of his followers abandoned him and joined the looters. Osman II had a low opinion of Janibek but left him on the throne. In 1622 Osman was killed by his janissaries. In February 1623 Mere Husein Pasha, a friend of Mehmed, became vizier. Mehmed was released from prison, made khan as Mehmed III and arrived in Kaffa on 19 May 1623. Janibek did not resist but went to istanbul where he was granted an estate at Edirne.

== Exile under Mehmed III 1623–1628 ==
In 1624 the Turks tried to replace Mehmed with Janibek. When their army was defeated the Turks re-confirmed Mehmed and pretended that their invasion was unauthorized. In 1627 Mehmed's brother killed Khan Temir's relatives. The Turks now had a strong ally against Mehmed. The Turks told Mehmed to attack Poland, planning to land Janibek in his absence. This did not work. The Turks then sent Janibek with janissaries to Kaffa. On the morning of 30 May 1628 Mehmed awoke to find that his commanders had gone over to Janibek. Mehmed fled. For details see Mehmed III Giray.

== Second reign 1628–1635 ==
Jannibek reached Bakhchisarai on 9 July 1628 and found his country a mess. There was plague, drought and famine and for the last few months groups of Crimeans and Nogais had been killing and looting each other. Within a month he restored some degree of order. Azamat Giray returned from Akkerman and became nureddin. In November 1628 Mehmet tried to regain the throne and was stopped at Perekop. In May 1629 he tried again and was killed. See Mehmed III Giray.

Later that year Khan Temir attacked the leaders of the Shirin clan. This caused so much hostility that he thought it best to return to Budjak. Janibek was glad to see him go. In the fall of 1629 kalga Devlet Giray and Khan Temir attacked Galicia in revenge for Polish support of Mehmed. They were defeated by Stefan Chmielecki and only 7000 of the original 10 to 15 thousand Crimeans returned alive. Janibek's son Mubarak twice raided the Dnieper and lost half of his men.

The Russo-Polish truce was about to expire and Russia tried to make an anti-Polish alliance with Turkey. See Smolensk War (1632–1634) and Polish–Ottoman War (1633–34). A Polish war was unpopular with the Crimeans because of their recent experience there and because the Russian-backed Don Cossacks had recently made several of raids on Crimea. Jannibek thought he could ignore the Turks because there was renewed rioting in Istanbul. Salman-Shah-Mirza led an officially unauthorized raid on the upper Don and returned with much loot, which also drew Russian troops from the Polish border. In the summer of 1633 Janibek's 18-year-old son and nureddin Mubarak Giray led the entire Crimean army north. Because Russian troops were away in Poland they crossed the Oka River. For some reason there were negotiations and the Crimean army went home. This seems to be the last time the Crimeans crossed the Oka. At this time the sultan ordered Janibek to join the war against Poland but he refused because his army was in Russia. In the summer of 1633 Murad IV repeated the order and threatened to remove Janibek. The problem was solved when a Persian advance forced the sultan to cancel his campaign. As part of the settlement of the Polish-Ottoman war the sultan decided to move Khan Temir away from the Polish border. In the summer of 1634 Janibek assembled an army on the Dnieper to get this done, but the sultan changed his mind and ordered Janibek to attack Persia.

== Deposition and death ==
In the spring of 1635 Janibek and his army were on the Kuban River moving toward Persia when a Turkish ambassador arrived with a decree removing him. When word got out Janibek lost all authority and fled to Taman, then Kaffa and then Istanbul. He was exiled to Rhodes where he met his old enemy Shahin Geray who was also then in exile. After a year and half the 70-year-old Janibek died. Because he had no living sons, his property was given to Shahin.

== Source and footnotes ==
- Oleksa Gaivoronsky «Повелители двух материков», Kiev-Bakhchisarai, second edition, 2010, ISBN 978-966-2260-02-1 Volume 2 pp. 27,30,31, 33–35, 41–67

Preceded by Selâmet I Giray	Khan of Crimea; 1610–1623	Succeeded by Mehmed III Giray
Preceded by Mehmed III Giray	Khan of Crimea; 1628–1635	Succeeded by İnayet Giray
