= Mykhailo Doroshenko =

Ukrainian Hetman

Mykhailo Doroshenko (Ukrainian: Михайло Дорошенко; died 1628) was the Hetman of the registered Ukrainian Cossacks from 1623 to 1628.

== Brief biography ==
Coat of arms

He was elevated to the rank of Cossack colonel in 1616, and he was active in Petro Konashevych's wars against Muscovy. He personally participated in the Battle of Khotyn in 1621. He was elected hetman around 1623. In early 1625 he made an alliance with Crimea. In late 1625 Stanisław Koniecpolski made him sign the Treaty of Kurukove in which the Cossacks renounced an independent foreign policy. This led him to conflicts with the Zaporozhian Cossacks who had opposed the treaty. Doroshenko oversaw the establishment of six registered regiments.

He died on 31 May 1628, in battle defending Crimean khan Mehmed III Giray against Khan Temir.

In 2013, with the support of the museum "muzei Hetmanstva" the "Hetman Petro Doroshenko fund" was created. The Fund carries out research activity about the Hetmans of Ukraine: Myhailo and Petro Doroshenko, shares the information about them, researches genealogy of Doroshenko.

== See also ==
- Hetman of Zaporizhian Cossacks
