= Alma (Crimea) =

Coordinates: 44°50′45″N 33°35′38″E

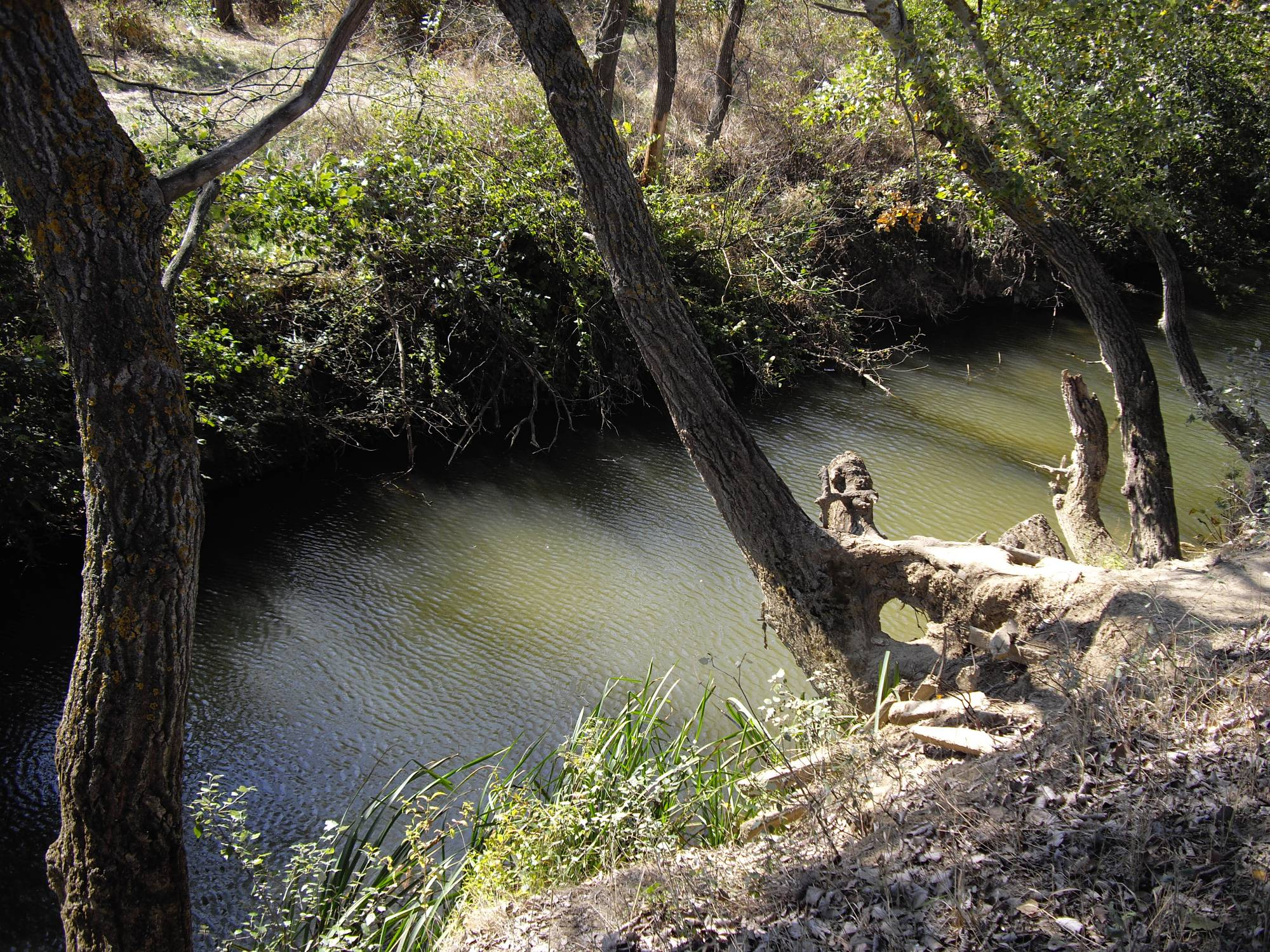
- Alma river near memorial of Battle of Alma
- Native name: Альма (Ukrainian)

Location
- Country: Crimea

Physical characteristics
- Source
  - location: Babuğan Yayla, Crimean Mountains
- Mouth
  - location: Kalamita bay of the Black Sea
- Length: 83 km (52 mi)

The Alma (Ukrainian: Альма; Russian: Альма, Crimean Tatar: Alma) is a small river in Crimea that flows from the Crimean Mountains in a broadly west-north-west direction to the Black Sea. Its mouth lies just south of Pishchane, halfway between Yevpatoria and Sevastopol. Alma is the Crimean Tatar word for an "apple".

== Geography ==
The Alma, formed by the confluence of the Sary-su, the Savlykh-su and the Babuganka (Babuğan Yayla) rivers, flows mostly through the mountains. The Alminskoye and Partizanskoye storage reservoirs are located along its course.

== History ==
During the Crimean War of 1853–1856, in the Battle of the Alma near the lower reaches of the Alma river, the allied British, French, and Ottoman armies defeated the Russians under Prince Aleksandr Sergeevich Menshikov on 20 September 1854.
