= Stefan Chmielecki =

Polish noble (died 1630)

- Born: around 1580
- Died: February 20, 1630
- Spouse: Teofila Chmielecka

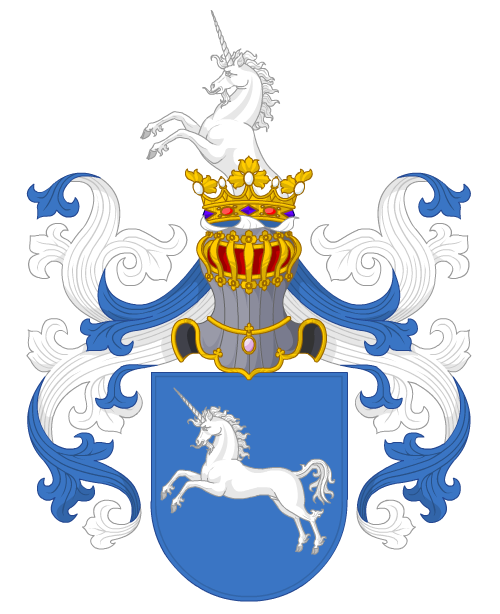

Stefan Chmielecki (died 1630) was a Polish noble of Chmieleccy noble family and voivode of Kiev (1629–1630). He was married to Teofila Chmielecka. He used Chmielecki's family crest: Bończa coat of arms

== Bibliography ==
- Władysław A. Serczyk, Na dalekiej Ukrainie. Dzieje Kozaczyzny do 1648 roku, Kraków - Wrocław 1984.
