= Budjak Horde =

Autonomous entity of the Nogai Horde

- 1620–1812
- Location of the Nogai Horde (1789)
- Status: Ottoman vassal (1620–1697); Crimean Khanate vassal (1697–1812)
- Capital: Akkerman (Note: The Budjak horde did not have a capital, but despite this Akkerman is considered to be the "main city" in the horde.)
- Common languages: Nogai, Tatar, Turkish
- Religion: Sunni Islam
- History
  - Established: 1620
  - Russian conquest: 1812
Preceded by	Succeeded by
Ottoman Empire; Principality of Moldavia	Russian Empire
- Today part of: Moldova, Ukraine

The Budjak Horde, (Note: Crimean Tatar: Bucaq Ordası; Romanian: Hoarda Bugeacului; Russian: Буджакская Орда, romanized: Budzhakskaya Orda; Ukrainian: Буджацька орда, romanized: Budzhats'ka orda.) also known as the Belgorod, Bilhorod or Akkerman Horde, was a semi-autonomous region under the protectorate of the Crimean Khanate and the Ottoman Empire's Silistra Eyalet. It was founded on the northern Black Sea coast area in present day southern Moldova and Budjak in Ukraine.

== History ==
Prior to the formation of the horde, the Black Sea are was settled by nomadic people. The region came under the control of the Golden Horde in the 13th century and saw an influx of Kipchaks to the area, who stayed there even after the collapse of the Golden Horde.

The beginning of the 16th century saw the appearance of the "Akkerman cossacks" in the region. It is believed that these were Nogais and other resettled subjects from the Golden Horde after their defeat by Meñli I Giray. The Budjak came under the control of the Crimean Khanate as a fief from Sultan Bayezid II, as thanks for during the various Moldavian–Ottoman Wars and the conquest of Budjak in 1536.

The second and main migration of the Nogais occurred as a response due to pressure from the Kalmyks. At first settling in the Crimean Khanate, the Nogais settled in the area of Budjak in the 17th century. Under the leadership of Khan Temir, the Nogais renounced Crimean Khanate vassalage. Seeing a valuable asset lost, the Crimean Khan Mehmed IV Giray organized an expedition in 1666 to punish the Nogais. Intervention from the Ottomans led to the removing of Mehmed IV and the permanent settlement of the Budjak area.

A small rebellion broke out in 1699 over disputes regarding Ottoman centralization and taxation. This was suppressed by a joint Ottoman and Crimean expedition.

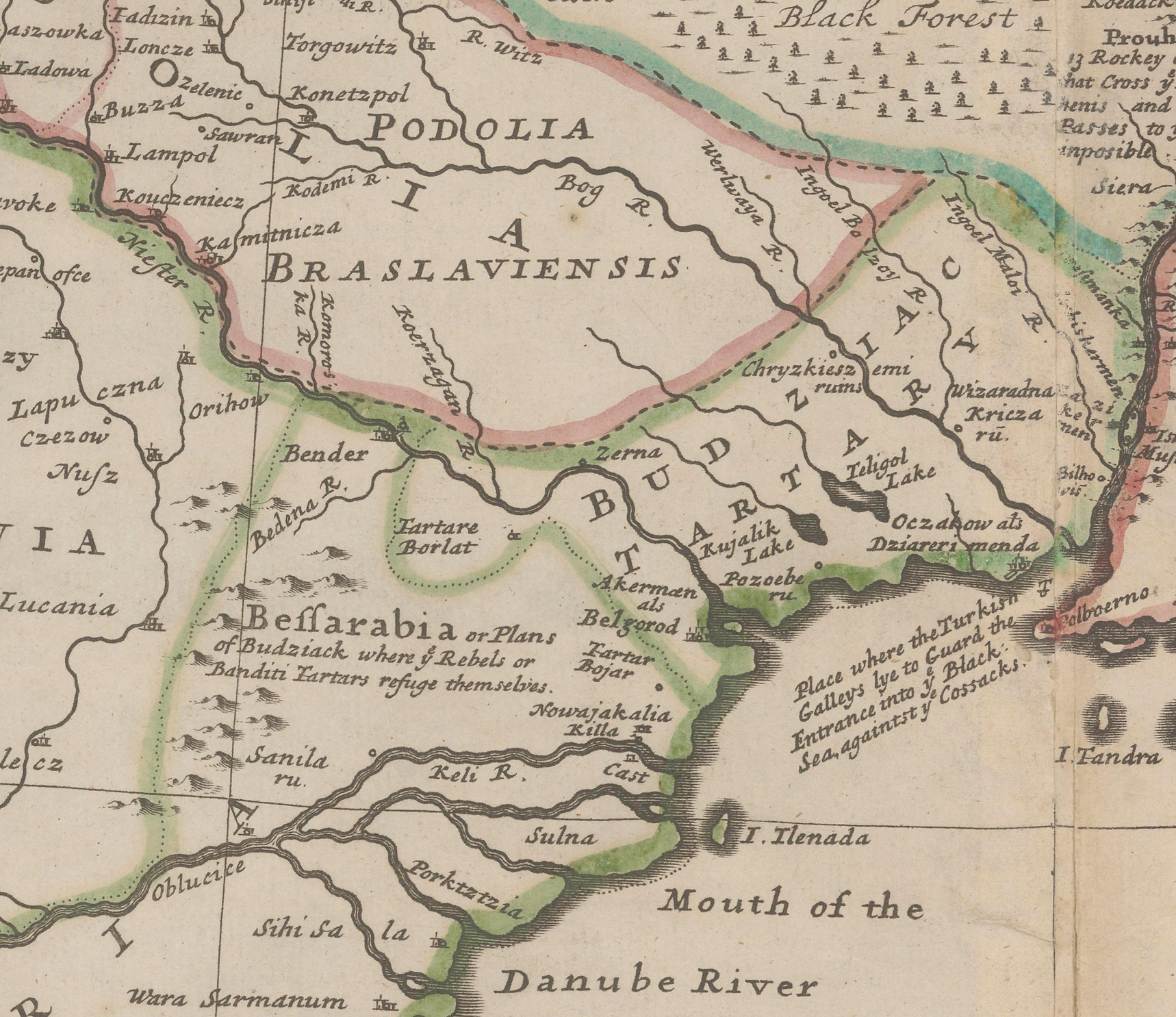
Map of the Budjak Horde (Budziac Tartary) by Herman Moll from around 1720

Between 1697–1723 the Crimean Khanate, a vassal of the Ottoman Empire, formally incorporated the Budjak, Yedisan, Yedishkul and Yamboiluk hordes. To effectively carry this out the Crimean Khanate appointed members from the Giray dynasty to act as Seraskers in the aforementioned hordes.

In 1728 Adil Giray Sultan led carried out various border conflicts with the Moldovan Principality, due to the lack of land and the decline of the war economy, leaving many locals disillusioned. Ottomans officials solved the dispute by distributing lands belonging to the Moldovan Principality and preventing an outright rebellion.

During the Russo-Turkish War (1768–1774), a portion of the horde sided with the Russian Empire and subsequently moved to the Sea of Azov region.

The horde ceased to exist as the local Nogai were expelled from the area in 1806–1807, during the course of the Russo-Turkish War of (1806–1812) and replaced with Bulgarian, Gagauz, Moldovan, Russian and Ukrainian settlers. The Treaty of Bucharest was signed in 1812, formally ceding the area of Budjak to the Russian Empire.

== Clans ==
Settlements in the horde were centered around clans, the Budjak was divided into seven main clans:

- Yedisan Horde;
- Orumbet-oglu clan;
- Orak-oglu;
- Kyrgyz;
- Kiyeyli;
- Keleshe;
- Dzhambulatoglu;

== Leaders ==
- 1603–1637 Khan Temir
- Giray family with rank of Serasker

== See also ==
- Budjak Tatars
- Crimean–Nogai slave raids in Eastern Europe
- Lesser Nogai Horde
- Yedisan Horde
