= Shahbaz Giray =

Crimean Tatar commander (died 1699)

- Born: Unknown; Crimean Khanate
- Died: 1699 Besleney Principality
- Allegiance: Crimean Khanate
- Rank: Kalga
- Conflicts: Crimean campaigns (1687–1689); Great Turkish War; Polish–Ottoman War (1683–1699); Battle of Lwów (1695); Battle of Zenta; Crimean–Kalmyk wars; Crimean–Nogai slave raids in Eastern Europe; Crimean–Circassian wars; Crimean invasion of Besleney (1699) †

Shahbaz Giray (died 1699) was a Crimean Tatar prince and son of Selim I Giray. He served as a commander in several late 17th-century campaigns, including wars against the Polish–Lithuanian Commonwealth, Kalmyks, and Don Cossacks. During his brother Devlet II Giray’s reign, he became kalga but was killed in Kabardia around 1699 after a failed campaign.

== Biography ==
Shahbaz Giray was the son of Selim I Giray. After the beginning of his father's reign in 1684, he participated in several wars. The first mention of him is during the Crimean campaigns (1687–1689), when he, with his army of Nogais, Kumyks, and Circassians, helped stop the Russian invasion.

=== War with Poles ===
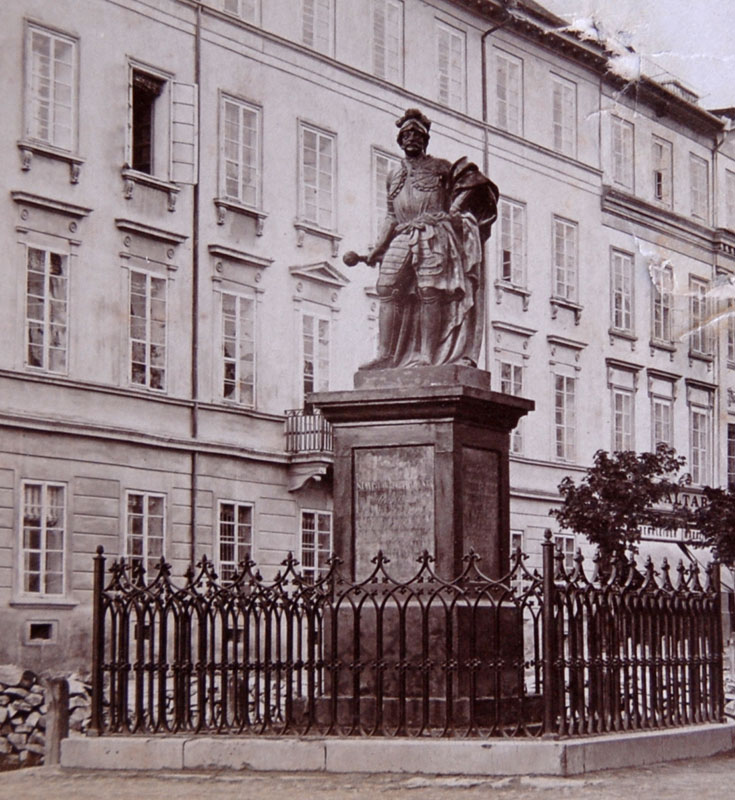
Monument to Stanisław Jabłonowski in Lviv

Shahbaz Giray's first recorded campaign in sources took place in 1694, during which his father, Selim I Giray, also participated. The joint Crimean–Ottoman army besieged Petrovaradin, but after a 22-day siege, they failed to capture it and lifted the siege. Following this failure, the army retreated to Belgrad, where Selim I dispatched 4,000 troops under Shahbaz Giray to defend Kamianets-Podilskyi Castle, which was under siege by John III Sobieski. Upon learning of the relief force, Sobieski marched with 30,000 Poles and Cossacks, alongside four Cossack hetmans. Although Shahbaz Giray resisted fiercely, he was ultimately defeated just three hours from the castle.

After two months, in February 1695, Shahbaz Giray launched another campaign against the Poles. Advancing deep into Polish territory, he encountered a Polish army of 8,000 troops. With equal numbers this time, Shahbaz Giray defeated the Poles and besieged Lviv. Stanisław Jan Jabłonowski, upon learning of the Tatars’ approach, issued mobilization orders and concentrated about 4,000 soldiers near the city. Fierce fighting occurred on February 11–12, with the Polish cavalry engaging the Tatars in narrow streets, while dismounted cavalry behind monastery walls fired on the attackers.

The Tatars were eventually driven out thanks to a well-organized counterattack, in which armed peasants wielding flails played a key role. Several Tatars were struck down and later captured. Unaccustomed to urban combat, the Tatars were repelled from the city, and further attempts to breach it from other sides failed. Polish losses, excluding volunteers, totaled around 400 soldiers, roughly comparable to Tatar casualties.

With the siege unsuccessful, Shahbaz Giray retreated, burning and raiding settlements along the way and taking substantial spoils. The campaign lasted 22 days.

=== First campaign against Cossacks ===
In 1695, following the failed Russian-Cossack siege of Azov, the Crimean beys launched a campaign against the Don Cossacks. Since Selim I was ill, he ordered his sons Shahbaz Giray, Ğazı III Giray, Devlet II Giray, and Qaplan I Giray to join the campaign, with Devlet II Giray as the main commander.

However, the Crimean army was heavily disorganized: Gazi Giray was on poor terms with Devlet II Giray and arrived late, while Qaplan Giray retreated after conducting minor ambushes against the Cossacks. This left only Shahbaz and Devlet II Giray, who raided the Barabash Cossacks but later retreated. The 24-day campaign ultimately proved unsuccessful.

=== Campaign in Europe ===
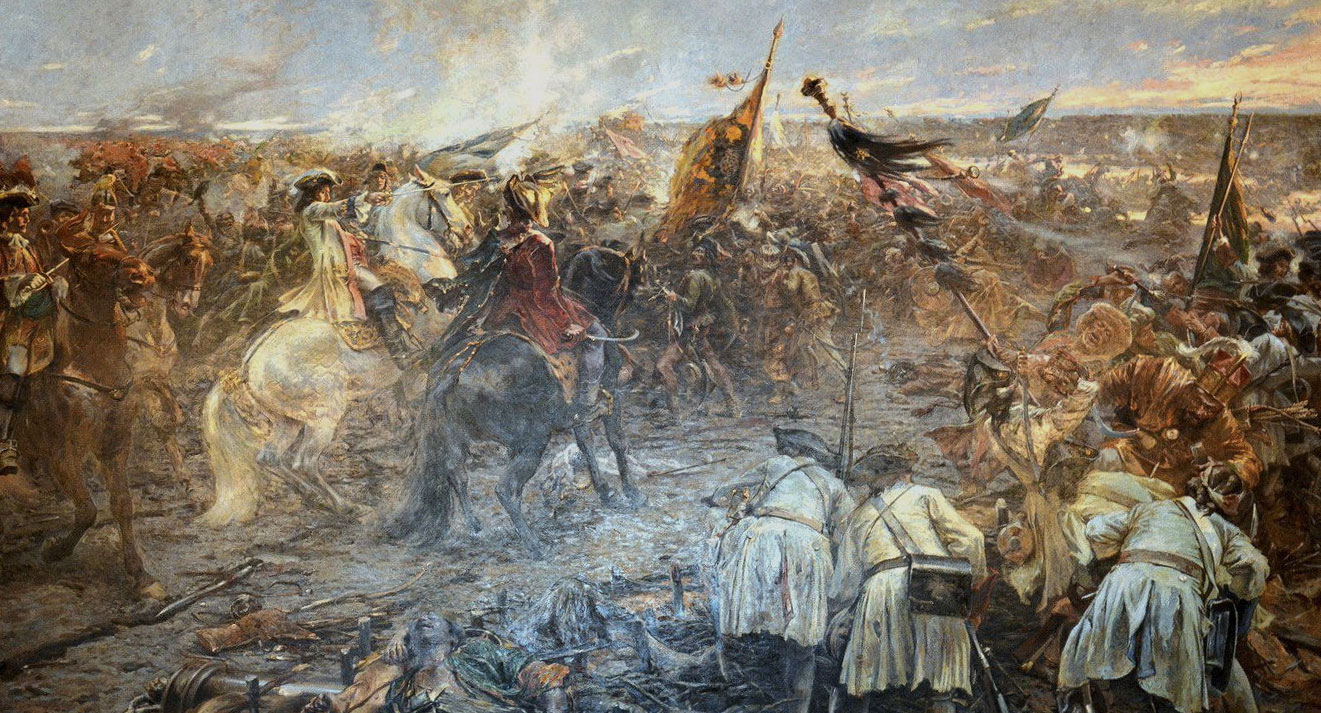
Battle of Zenta by Franz Eisenhut

In 1697, Mustafa II launched a campaign in Europe and ordered the Crimeans to assist him. As Selim I Giray was ill, he sent his son Shahbaz Giray with an army of 10,000 men to support the Ottomans. He arrived in June and joined the Ottoman army. According to Mehmed Giray, when Shahbaz Giray was received by the Sultan, he was served sherbet and coffee; however, Halil İnalcık disputes this account.

During the campaign, Shahbaz Giray was tasked with gathering intelligence on the enemy and capturing prisoners for interrogation. During the capture of Titel, he fought alongside the Ottoman army and pursued the retreating enemy, taking several prisoners. The campaign of Mustafa II ended with the Battle of Zenta. Shahbaz Giray fought alongside Elmas Mehmed Pasha, who was killed in the battle. Shahbaz was saved during the final stage of the engagement by another soldier and managed to survive. Afterward, he returned to Crimea.

=== Second campaign against the Cossacks ===
In September, Shahbaz Giray was ordered to attack the Barabash Cossacks. In January or February, he began the campaign with an army of 10,000 men. During the expedition, he besieged and burned the fortress of Chogay (according to Ahmet Cavid Pancova.), destroying parts of it and returning with considerable spoils. However, on his way back, his forces were ambushed by Russian troops near a lake called Pojrak. Despite the surprise attack, Shahbaz managed to escape with minimal losses and returned to Crimea after a 43-day campaign. Around this time, the Ottomans began peace negotiations with the Holy League, culminating in the signing of the Treaty of Karlowitz in 1699.

=== Campaign against the Kalmyks ===
That same year, a letter from Selim I Giray mentions Shahbaz Giray’s successful raid into Kalmyk territory and his safe return. Although the exact date of the letter is unknown, it is believed to have been written shortly before Selim Giray’s abdication.

=== Campaign against the Circassians and death ===
After the abdication of Selim I Giray, his son and Shahbaz’s brother, Devlet II Giray, ascended to the throne and appointed Shahbaz as Kalga. Later, Devlet Giray ordered him to lead a campaign against Circassia. During the expedition, the Crimean forces engaged in widespread devastation, taking prisoners and seizing livestock. However, the campaign ultimately failed, and Shahbaz Giray was killed.

The exact reason of his death remain disputed. Some sources claim he was killed in lands of Besleney, at the home of prince Temir-Bulat Qanaqo. According to Crimean historian Abdülgaffar Kırımî, Shahbaz was slain in his sleep by the Circassian lord Timur Poladoğlu Zaver Bey. Other accounts by Müstecip Ülküsal and Halim Giray suggest that he was captured by the Circassians and later executed.

Meanwhile, Defterdar Sarı Mehmed Pasha and Johann Wilhelm Zinkeisen state that he was poisoned. According to Mehmed Giray, Shahbaz Giray was assassinated by Circassians while resting in his tent. Late at night, several Circassian soldiers attempted to enter, but his guards prevented them, leading to a skirmish that woke Shahbaz. Curious, he ordered his men to let them in, only for the Circassians to attack immediately. Shahbaz was killed by gunfire and daggers. The assailants escaped and were never found despite an extensive search.

== See also ==
Selim I Giray
Polish–Ottoman War (1683–1699)
Crimean-Circassian Wars

== Sources ==
- Güneş Yağcı, Zübeyde (2022). "Kırım'da Bir Hanzadenin Yaşamı: Hacı Selim Giray'ın Oğlu Şahbaz Giray". Journal of International Eastern European Studies. 4 (1). Journal of International Eastern European Studies / Uluslararası Doğu Avrupa Araştırmaları Dergisi: 75–103.
