= Slave raiding =

Military attack launched against a settlement

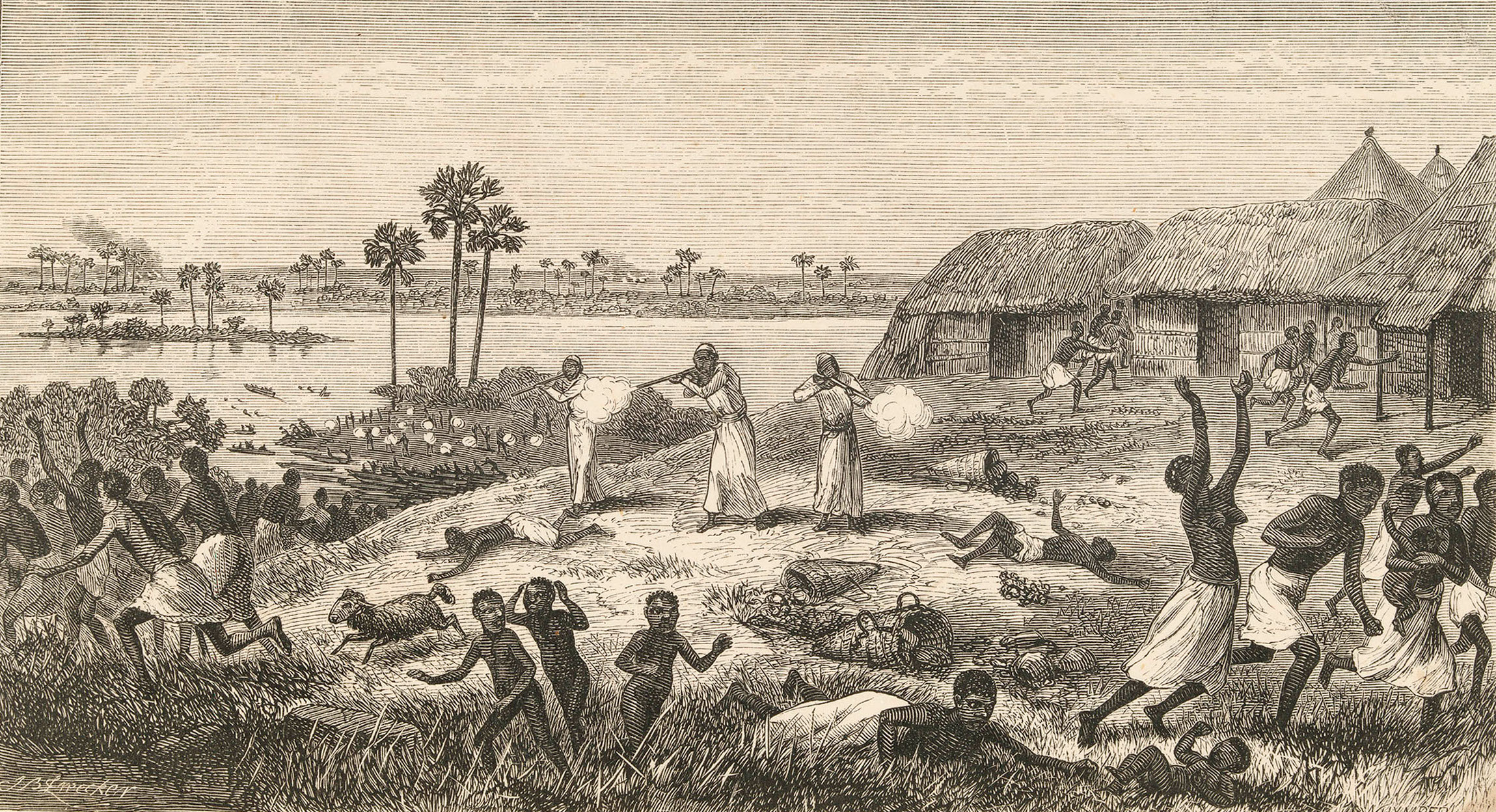
Arab slave raid on a Congolese village, as witnessed by David Livingstone in 1871

Slave raiding is a military raid for the purpose of capturing people and bringing them from the raid area to serve as slaves. Once a common part of warfare, it is now widely considered a war crime. Slave raiding has occurred since antiquity. Some of the earliest surviving written records of slave raiding come from Sumer (in present-day Iraq). Kidnapping and prisoners of war were the most common sources of African slaves, although indentured servitude or punishment also resulted in slavery.

The many alternative methods of obtaining human beings to work in indentured or other involuntary conditions, as well as technological and cultural changes, have made slave raiding rarer.

== Reasons ==
Slave raiding was a large and lucrative trade on the coasts of Africa, in Europe, Mesoamerica, and in medieval Asia. The Crimean–Nogai slave raids in Eastern Europe provided some two or three million slaves to the Ottoman Empire via the Crimean slave trade over the course of four centuries. The Barbary pirates from the 16th century onward through 1830 engaged in razzias in Africa and the European coastal areas as far away as Iceland, capturing slaves for the Muslim slavery market in North Africa and West Asia. The Atlantic slave trade was predicated on European countries endorsing and supporting slave raiding between African tribes to supply the workforce of agricultural plantations in the Americas. For three and a half centuries, European slave traders, primarily Iberian, transported African captives across the Atlantic in slave ships. The ships came from the ports of all the major European maritime powers—Spain, Portugal, the Netherlands, Denmark, Sweden, Great Britain, France, and Brandenburg-Prussia.

=== Methods ===
The act of slave raiding involves an organised and concerted attack on a settlement with the purpose of taking the area's people. The collected new slaves are often kept in some form of slave pen or depot. From there, the slave takers will transport them to a distant place by means such as a slave ship or camel caravan. When conquered people are enslaved and remain in their place, it is not raiding.

== Historically ==
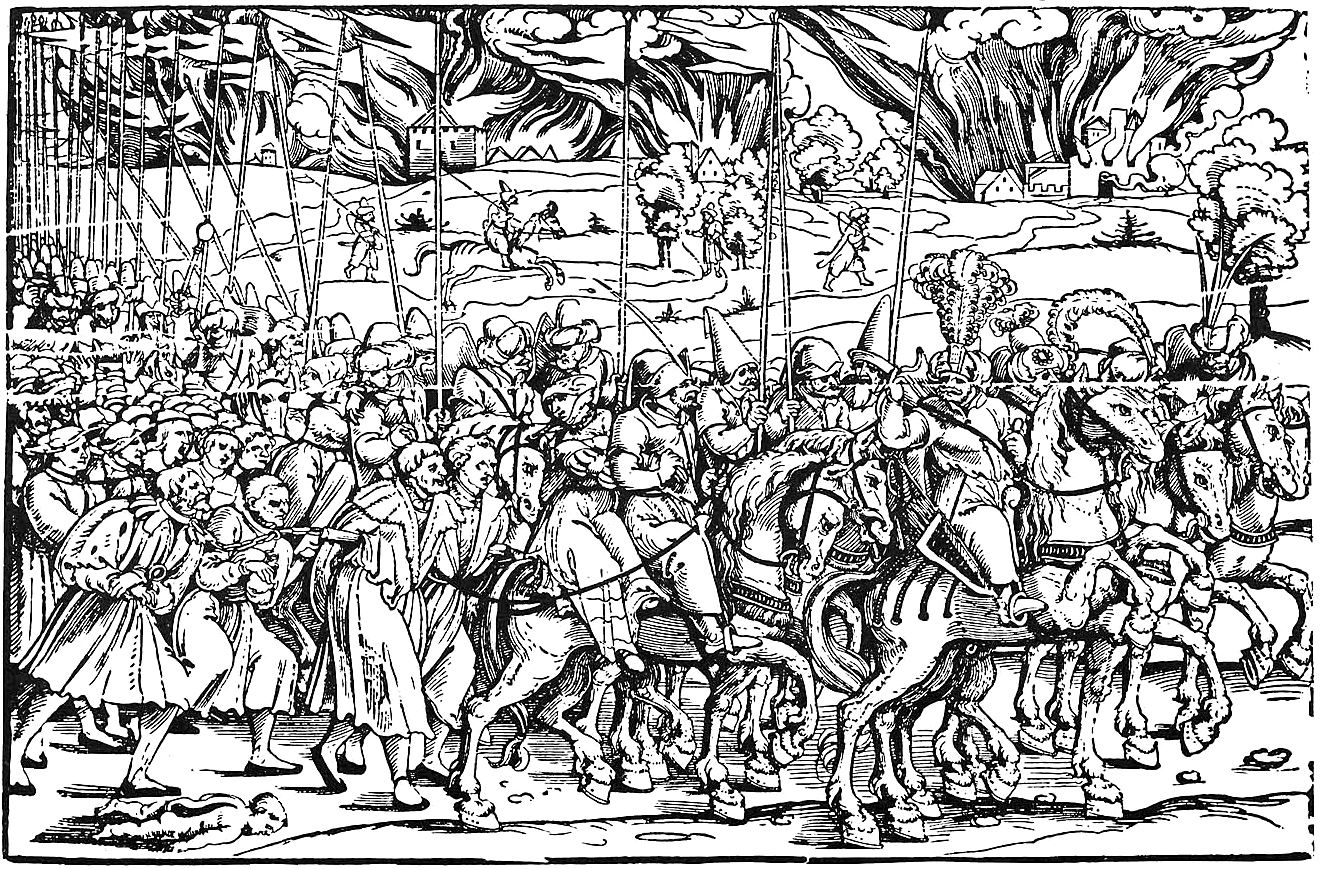
Ottoman Turks with Christian slaves from the Ottoman expansion into the Balkans, woodcut by Erhard Schön, c. 1530

=== Saracen piracy ===
During the Middle ages, Saracen Andalusian pirates established themselves in bases in southern France, the Baleares, Southern Italy and Sicily, from which they raided the coasts of the Christian Mediterranean and exported their prisoners as Saqaliba slaves to the slave markets of the Muslim West Asia.

The Aghlabids of Ifriqiya was a base for Saracen attacks along the Spanish East coast as well as against Southern Italy from the early 9th century; they attacked Rome in 845, Comacchio in 875-876, Monte Cassino in 882-83, and established the Emirate of Bari (847–871), the Emirate of Sicily (831–1091) and a base in Garigliano (882-906), which became bases of slave trade. During the warfare between Rome and the Byzantine Empire in Southern Italy in the 9th century the Saracens made Southern Italy a supply source for a slave trade to Maghreb by the mid-9th century; the Western Emperor Louis II complained in a letter to the Byzantine Emperor that the Byzantines in Naples guided the Saracens in their raids toward South Italy and aided them in their slave trade with Italians to North Africa, an accusation noted also by the Lombard Chronicler Erchempert.

Moorish Saracen pirates from al-Andalus attacked Marseille and Arles and established a base in Camargue, Fraxinetum or La Garde-Freinet-Les Mautes (888–972), from which they made slave raids in to France; the population fled in fear of the slave raids, which made it difficult for the Frankish to secure their Southern coast, and the Saracens of Fraxinetum exported the Frankisk prisoners they captured as slaves to the slave market of the Muslim Middle East.

The Saracens captured the Baleares in 903, and made slave raids also from this base toward the coasts of the Christian Mediterranean and Sicily.

While the Saracen bases in France was eliminated in 972, this did not prevent the Saracen piracy slave trade of the Mediterranean; both Almoravid dynasty (1040–1147) and the Almohad Caliphate (1121–1269) approved of the slave raiding of Saracen pirates toward non-Muslim ships in Gibraltar and the Mediterranean for the purpose of slave raiding.

=== Samanid Empire ===
A major supply source to the Samanid slave trade was the non-Muslim Turkic peoples of Central Asian steppe, which were both bought as well as regularly kidnapped in slave raids by the thousands to supply the Bukhara slave trade.

The slave trade with Turkic people was the biggest slave supply for the Samanid Empire. Until the 13th century, the majority of Turkic peoples were not Muslims but adherents of Tengrism, Buddhism, and various forms of animism and shamanism, which made them infidels and as such legitimate targets for enslavement by Islamic law. Many slaves in the medieval Islamic world referred to as "white" were of Turkic origin.

From the 7th century onward, when the first Islamic military campaigns were conducted toward Turkic lands in Caucasus and Central Asia, Turkic people were enslaved as war captives and then trafficked as slaves via slave raids via southern Russia and the Caucasus into Azerbaijan, and through Karazm and Transoxania into Khorasan and Iran; in 706 the Arab governor Qotayba b. Moslem killed all men in Baykand in Sogdia and took all the women and children as slaves in to the Umayyad Empire and in 676 eighty Turkic nobles captured from the queen of Bukhara were abducted to the governor Saʿīd b. ʿOṯmān of Khorasan to Medina as agricultural slaves, where they killed their slaver and then committed suicide.

The military campaigns were gradually replaced by pure commercial Muslim slave raids against non-Muslim Turks into "infidel territory" (dār al-ḥarb) in the Central Asian steppe, resulting in a steady flow of Turks to the Muslim slave markets of Bukhara, Darband, Samarkand, Kīš, and Nasaf. Aside from slave raids by Muslim slave traders, Turkic captives were also provided to the slave trade as war captives after warfare among the Turkic peoples themselves in the steppes (as was the case of Sebüktigin), and in some cases sold by their own families.

al-Baladhuri described how Caliph al-Mamun used to write to his governors in Khurasan to raid those peoples of Transoxiana who had not submitted to Islam:

"when al-Mutasim became Caliph he did the same to the point that most of his military leaders came from Transoxiana: Soghdians, Farhanians, Ushrusanians, peoples of Shash, and others [even] their kings came to him. Islam spread among those who lived there, so they began raiding the Turks who lived there".

Turkic slaves were the main slave supply of the Samanid slave trade, and regularly formed a part of the land tax sent to the Abbasid capital of Baghdad; the geographer Al-Maqdisi (ca. 375/985) noted that in his time the annual levy (ḵarāj) included 1,020 slaves. The average rate for a Turkic slave in the 9th century was 300 dirhams, but a Turkic slave could be sold for as much as 3,000 dinars.

The trade in Turkic slaves via Bukhara continued for centuries after the end of the Samanid Empire.

=== Vikings ===
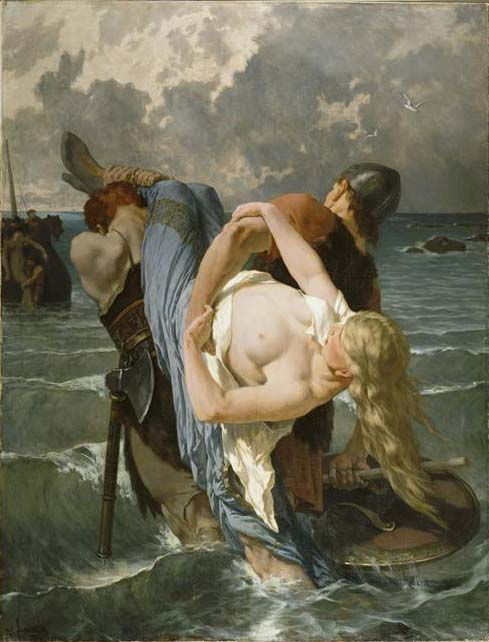
The Annals of Ulster record that in AD 821 Howth, Co. Dublin, was raided and 'a great booty of women was carried away'.

The Vikings raided the coastlines of Ireland for people, cattle and goods. High status captives were taken back to their community or families to be ransomed—this included bishops and kings. In the Annals of Ulster it is recorded that in 821 AD Howth, was raided and "a great booty of women was carried away". By the tenth and eleventh centuries the Vikings had established slave markets in Ireland's major ports. However, following political allegiances with the Vikings, the Irish Kings also took local captives to profit from these slave markets. By the late tenth century, the Vikings began to suffer significant military defeats and the Irish Kings now seized captives from the defeated Viking armies and their captured towns, with the justification that the inhabitants were foreigners bearing the sins of their ancestors.

The Norsemen were first recorded in Ireland in 795, when they plundered the island of Rathlin. This island, off the northeast coast of Ireland, is home to numerous burial sites with official evidence of their existence. According to the Annals of Ulster, the first raid on this island was known as "Loscad Rechrainne o geinntib," also known as "the burning of Rechru by heathens." Sporadic raids continued until 832, after which the Norsemen began to establish fortified settlements throughout the country. Norse raids continued throughout the 10th century, but resistance to them grew. The Norsemen established independent kingdoms in Dublin, Waterford, Wexford, Cork, and Limerick. These kingdoms did not survive subsequent Norman invasions, but the towns continued to grow and prosper.

=== Crimean–Nogai slave raids ===
The Crimean–Nogai slave raids in Eastern Europe provided some two or three million slaves for slavery in the Ottoman Empire via the Crimean slave trade between the 15th century and the late 18th century. During this period the Crimean Khanate was the destination of the Crimean–Nogai slave raids in Eastern Europe, and European and Circassian slaves were trafficked to the Middle East via the Crimea.

=== Kazakh and Turkmen raids ===
The Kazakh-Russian conflicts of the 17th–18th centuries were a series of armed confrontations between the Kazakh Khanate and the Tsardom of Russia, later the Russian Empire, as well as their subjects: the Cossacks, Bashkirs, and Kalmyks. The Kazakh raids into Russia were accompanied by looting and the abduction of people into slavery. The raids began during the reign of Tauke Khan in 1690 and continued intermittently until the end of the 18th century. Isolated raids also occurred in the early and late 19th century. The captives of the Kazakh raids were among the suppliers to the Khivan slave trade and the Bukhara slave trade.

Turkmen tribal groups also performed regular slave raids, referred to as alaman. Shia Persians were considered legitimate targets by Sunni Muslim Turkmens and Uzbek slave traders. Many of them were captured during Turkmen slave raids into the villages of northwestern Iran. A notorious slave market for Persian slaves was located in the Khanate of Khiva from the 17th to the 19th centuries.

=== Barbary pirates ===
European slaves were acquired by Barbary pirates in slave raids on ships and by raids on coastal towns from Italy to the Netherlands, Ireland and the southwest of Britain, as far north as Iceland and into the Eastern Mediterranean. On some occasions, settlements such as Baltimore in Ireland were abandoned following a raid, only being resettled many years later.

=== West Africa ===
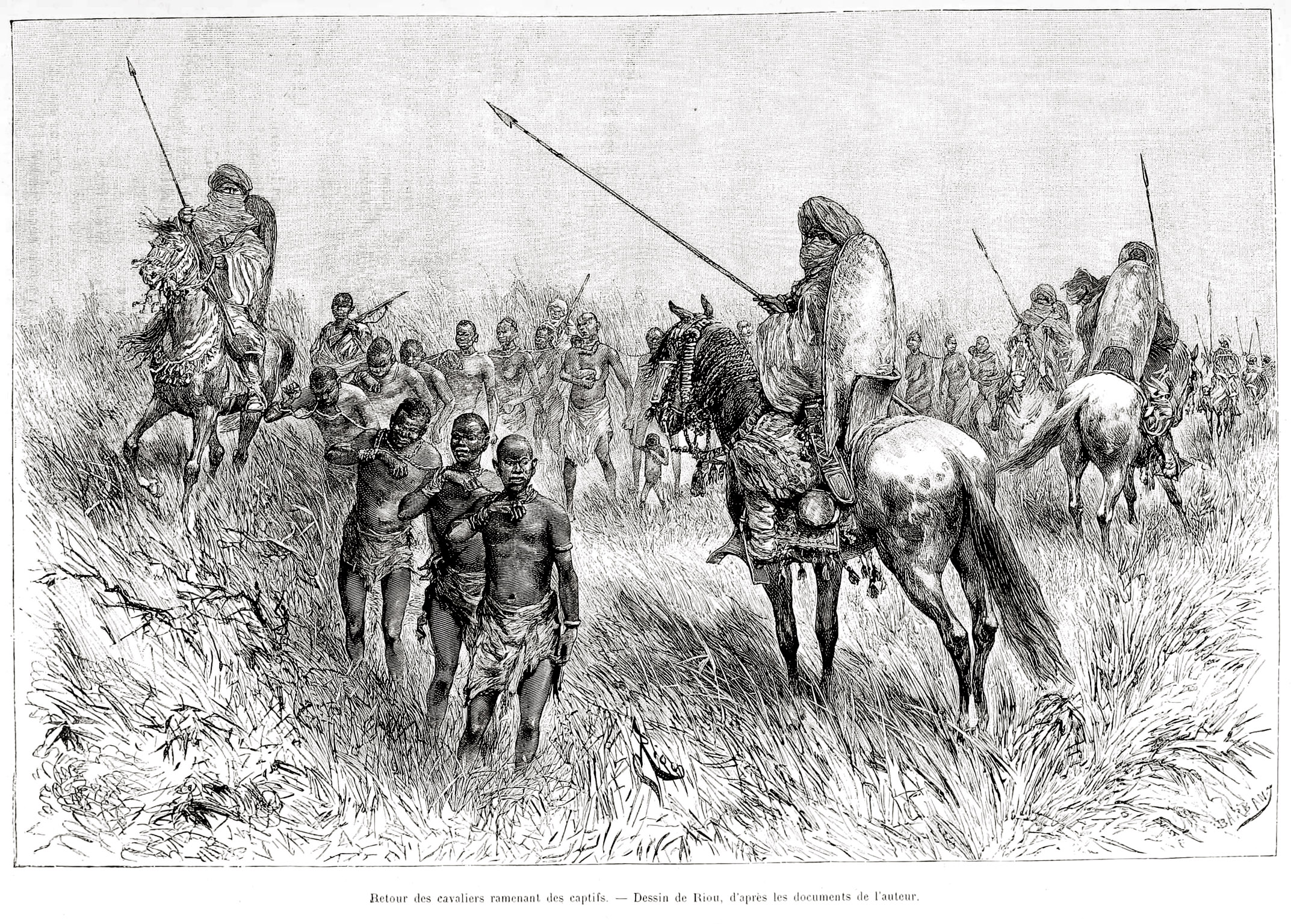
Boukary Koutou's Mossi cavalry returning with captives from a raid

Raiding villages was also a method of capturing slaves in Africa, and accounted for the overwhelming majority of West African slaves. While there was some slave raiding along the African coasts by Europeans, much of the raiding that took place was performed by other West Africans powers. Gomes Eannes de Azurara, who witnessed a Portuguese raid noted that some captives drowned themselves, others hid in under their huts, and others hid their children among the seaweed. Portuguese coastal raiders found that raiding was too costly and often ineffective and opted for established commercial relations.

The increase in the demand for slaves due to the expansion of European colonial powers to the New World made the slave trade much more lucrative to the West African powers, leading to the establishment of a number of actual West African empires thriving on the slave trade. The vast majority of those who were transported in the transatlantic slave trade were from Central Africa and West Africa and had been sold by West African slave traders to European slave traders, while others had been captured directly by the slave traders in coastal raids. European slave traders gathered and imprisoned the enslaved at forts on the African coast and then brought them to the Western hemisphere. These included the Bono State, Oyo empire (Yoruba), Kong Empire, Imamate of Futa Jallon, Imamate of Futa Toro, Kingdom of Koya, Kingdom of Khasso, Kingdom of Kaabu, Fante Confederacy, Ashanti Confederacy, and the kingdom of Dahomey. These kingdoms relied on a militaristic culture of constant warfare to generate the great numbers of human captives required for trade with the Europeans.

=== Bandeirantes ===
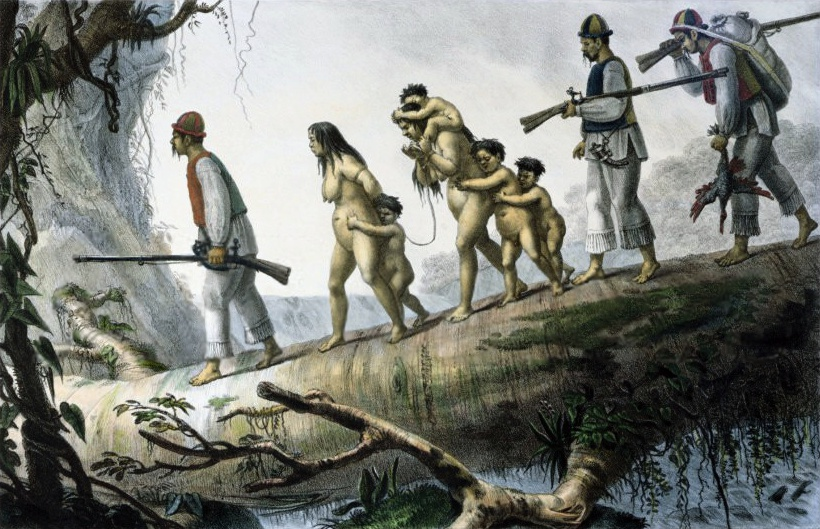
Painting by Jean-Baptiste Debret depicting bandeiras enslaving Guaraní people in the Brazilian interior

Bandeirantes were frontiersmen and explorers in colonial Brazil who, from the early 16th century, participated in inland expeditions to find precious metals and enslave indigenous peoples. They played a major role in expanding Brazil's borders to its approximate modern-day limits, beyond the boundaries demarcated by the 1494 Treaty of Tordesillas. Most bandeirantes hailed from São Paulo. Some bandeirantes were descended from Portuguese colonists who settled in São Paulo, but most were of mameluco descent with both Portuguese and indigenous ancestry.

=== Spanish in Chile ===
Although there was a general ban on enslavement of indigenous people by Spanish Crown, the 1598–1604 Mapuche uprising that ended with the Destruction of the Seven Cities made the Spanish in 1608 declare slavery legal for those Mapuches caught in war. Mapuches "rebels" were considered Christian apostates and could therefore be enslaved according to the church teachings of the day. In reality these legal changes only formalized Mapuche slavery that was already occurring at the time, with captured Mapuches being treated as property in the way that they were bought and sold among the Spanish. Legalisation made Spanish slave raiding increasingly common in the Arauco War. Mapuche slaves were exported north to places such as La Serena and Lima. The Mapuche uprising of 1655 had parts of its background in the slave hunting expeditions of Juan de Salazar, including his failed 1654 expedition. Slavery for Mapuches "caught in war" was abolished in 1683 after decades of legal attempts by the Spanish Crown to suppress it.

=== Southeast Asia ===
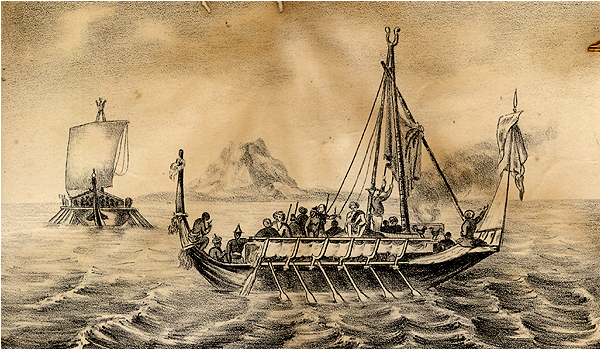
Garay pirate ships in the Sulu Sea, c. 1850

Slavery in Southeast Asia reached its peak in the late 18th and early 19th centuries, when fleets of lanong and garay warships of the Iranun and Banguingui people started engaging in piracy and coastal raids for slave and plunder throughout Southeast Asia from their territories within the Sultanate of Sulu and Maguindanao. It is estimated that from 1770 to 1870, 200,000 to 300,000 people were enslaved by Iranun and Banguingui slavers.

=== North America ===
The Haida and Tlingit peoples, who lived along the southeastern Alaskan coast, were traditionally known as fierce warriors and slave-traders, raiding as far as California.

From the early 18th century to the 1870s, the Comanche were the dominant tribe of the Southern Plains. As American settlers encroached on their territory, the Comanche waged war on the settlers and raided their settlements, as well as those of neighboring Native American tribes. They took with them captives from other tribes during warfare, using them as slaves, selling them to the Spanish and (later) to Mexican settlers, or adopting them into their tribe.

=== South African Republic and the Boer Republics ===
The practice of slavery and slave raiding also took place along the borders of the South African Republic by the Boers up until at least 1870. West Transvaal Boers and others procured women and children as slaves and used them as domestic servants and plantation workers. Boer slave raids in the South African Republic were regular and the number captured totaled in the thousands. This is despite the prohibition of slavery north of the Vaal River under the 1852 Sand River Convention.

== See also ==
- Abduction
- Bride kidnapping
- Blackbirding
- Crimean–Nogai slave raids in Eastern Europe
- Turkish Abductions
- Shanghaiing

== Bibliography ==
- Barros Arana, Diego. Historia general de Chile (in Spanish). Vol. Tomo cuarto (Digital edition based on the second edition of 2000 ed.). Alicante: Biblioteca Virtual Miguel de Cervantes.
- Foerster, Rolf (1993). Introducción a la religiosidad mapuche (in Spanish). Editorial Universitaria.
- Valenzuela Márquez, Jaime (2009). "Esclavos mapuches. Para una historia del secuestro y deportación de indígenas en la colonia". In Gaune, Rafael; Lara, Martín (eds.). Historias de racismo y discriminación en Chile (in Spanish).
