= Crimean campaign (1687) =

Campaigns in the Russo-Turkish War (1686–1700)

- Part of the Russo-Turkish War (1686–1700) and Crimean campaigns (1687–1689)
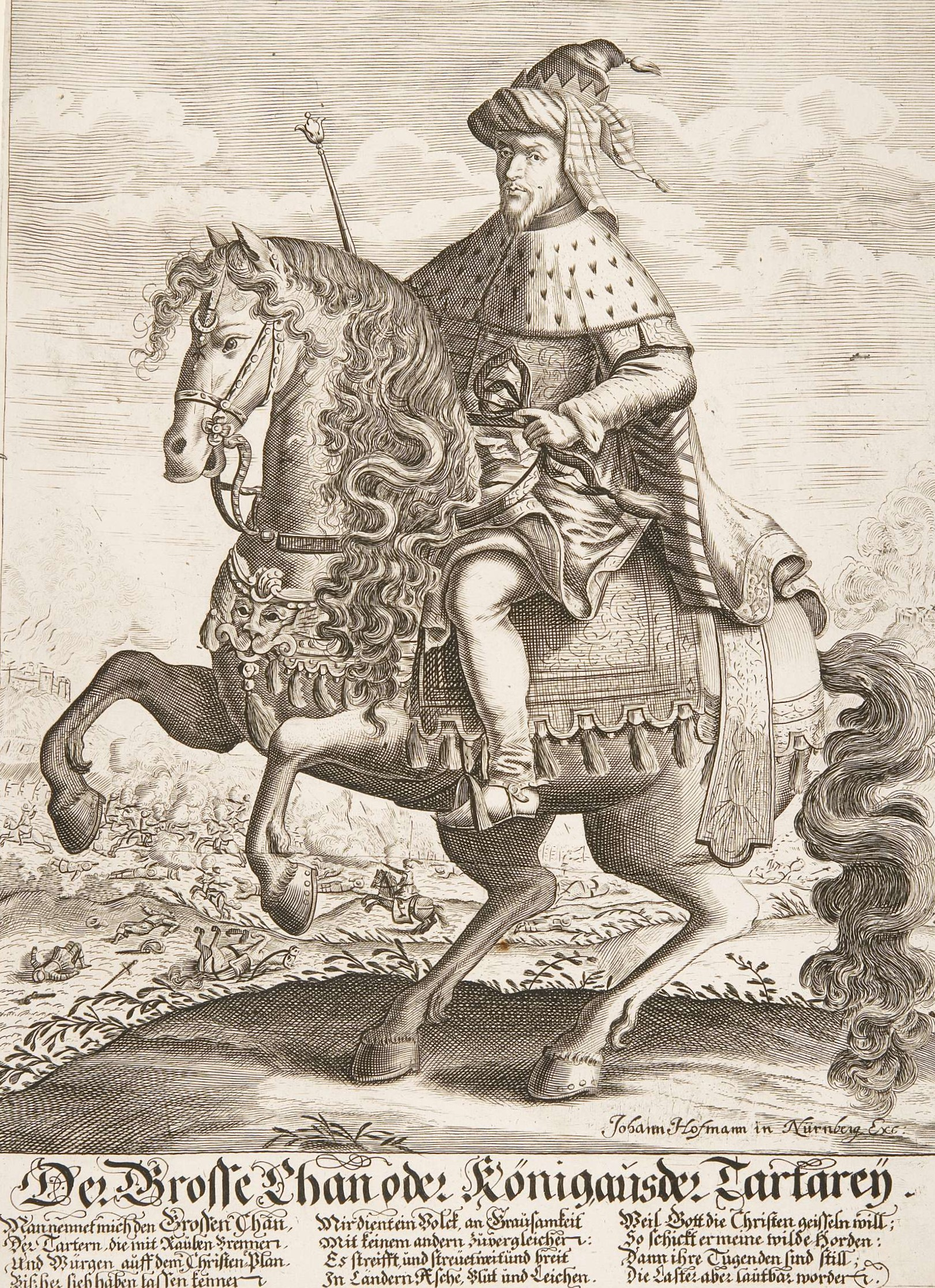
- Selim I Giray
Date	1687
Location	Ukraine
Result	Ottoman–Tatar victory

Belligerents
Ottoman Empire: Crimean Khanate	Tsardom of Russia: Cossack Hetmanate

Commanders and leaders
Selim I Giray; Suleiman II	Vasily Golitsyn; Ivan Samoylovych

Strength
32,000	160,000–200,000

Casualties and losses
None	30,000 dead (from hunger, thirst and disease)

In 1687, after joining the Holy League, Russia launched its first major military campaign against the Crimean Khanate. An army under the command of Prince Vasily Golitsyn advanced south with the aim of invading Crimea. However, the campaign ended in a major failure due to logistical problems and the strategic actions of Crimean Khan Selim Giray.

== Background ==
Russia's joining the Holy League in 1686 led to a military campaign against the Crimean Khanate. The main aim of the alliance was to prevent the Crimean Khanate from providing assistance to the Ottoman Empire, which was at war with Austria and others. Russia gave several reasons for the campaign, among them ending Crimean raids, abolishing its annual tribute to the Khanate, and retaliating for the Khanate's support of Doroshenko's anti-Russian policies.

== Campaign ==
The Russian army under the command of Prince Vasily Golitsyn was reinforced by 50,000 Cossacks under Ivan Samoylovych. This brought the army's total strength to between 160,000 and 200,000 men. Golitsyn's plan was to advance southwest through Zaporozhian territory and then capture Perekop, thereby cutting Crimea off from the mainland. At the same time, the Don Cossacks would attack Ottoman fortresses east of the Sea of Azov, while the Zaporozhian Cossacks would do the same along the lower Dnieper to prevent reinforcements from reaching Crimea.

The army began its advance on 8 March 1687, moving in a massive square wagon fort formation consisting of approximately 20,000 wagons. However, the summer heat limited the army's advance to only about 10 km per day. When Selim Giray learned that the Russians were approaching, he ordered his men to set fire to the steppes along the route to Perekop, rendering the area's pastures and water sources unusable. His aim was to force the Russian army to retreat by depriving it of food and water. The burned steppe left the army without sufficient fodder for its more than 60,000 horses and oxen, further straining its supplies. From 13 June, the Russian army struggled with severe shortages of food and water. The army lost around 30,000 men.

Vasily Golitsyn subsequently convened a council of war and decided to withdraw his army while still 90 miles short of Perekop. Before the retreat, he detached 20,000 Russian and Cossack troops under Nepliuyev to attack Ottoman forts along the Dnieper. Ivan Samoylovych, the Cossack ataman who had opposed the campaign, was held responsible for its failure. Golitsyn ordered his arrest on 23 July, and Samoylovych was arrested while praying in church. On 25 July, Ivan Mazepa was unanimously elected as the new hetman. The army then began its retreat, and returned to Moscow by early September.

== Aftermath ==
The campaign failed, and the Russia army was forced to withdraw without reaching Perekop. Despite its numerical superiority, the Russian army's wagon formation slowed its advance, while Selim Giray's scorched-earth tactics disrupted its supply lines and made further progress impossible. The defeat highlighted the difficulties Russia faced in launching large-scale campaigns against the Crimean Khanate.
