= Murad Giray =

Khan of Crimea from 1678 to 1683

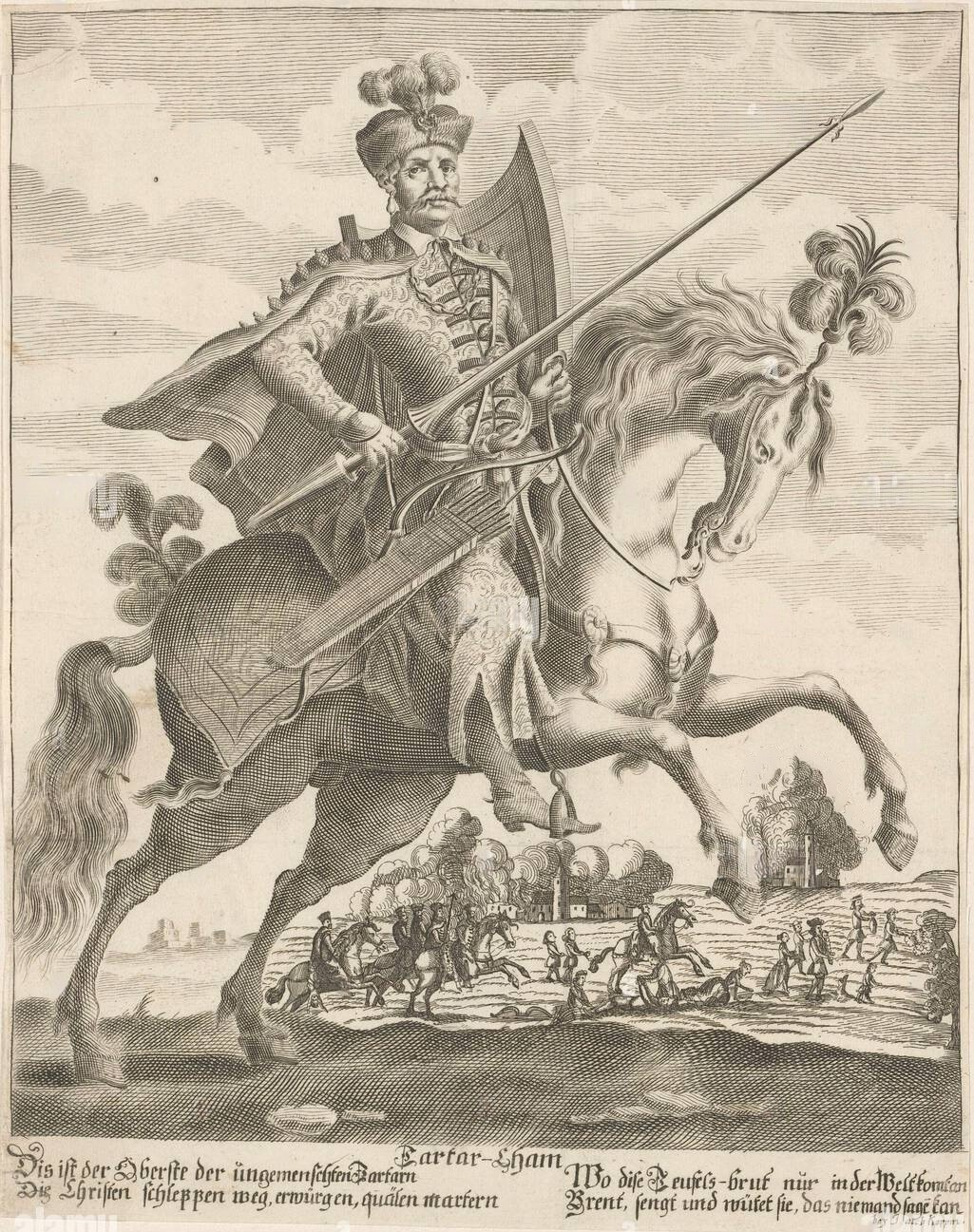

Khan of the Tatar Crimean Khanate
- Reign: 1678–1683
- Predecessor: Selim I Giray
- Successor: Haci II Giray
- Born: 1627
- Died: 1696 (aged 68–69); Yambol
- Dynasty: Giray dynasty
- Religion: Islam
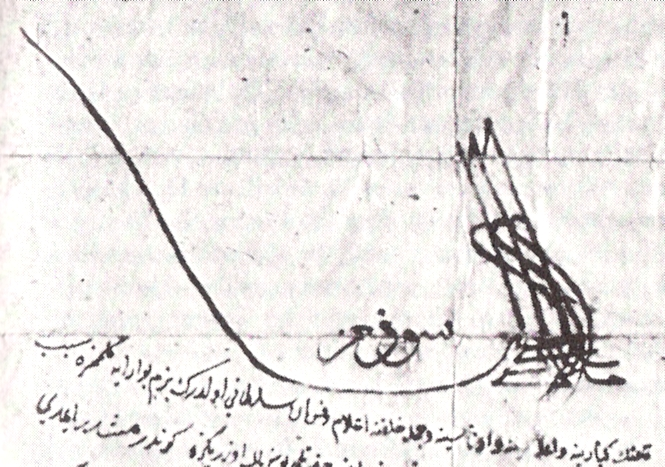
- Tughra

Murad Giray (Note: Crimean Tatar, Ottoman Turkish and Persian: مراد کرای) (1627–1696; reigned 1678–1683) was a Khan of the Crimean Khanate between the first and second reigns of his cousin Selim I Giray. His father was Mubarek, one of the many sons of Selâmet I Giray (1608-1610). Three of his uncles were Khans. None of his descendants became Khans. During his Khanship, his nureddin was the future Khan, Saadet III Giray, and his Kalga was Tokhtamysh, a brother of future Khan Safa Giray of Crimea.

== Early life ==
Murad was raised in Yambol as one of the many Giray princes supported and controlled by the Ottoman Empire. After the death of his father, he was cared for by his uncle, Rezmi Bahadır Giray.

From 1659 to 1663 he was nureddin during the second reign of Mehmed IV Giray. He then retired to Istanbul.

== Khanate ==
In 1678 the Turks made him Khan in place of his cousin Selim I Giray who had performed poorly at the siege of Chyhyryn. This was at the time of the Russo-Turkish War (1676–1681). After more fighting, in which Crimea was involved, the Treaty of Bakhchisarai (1681) recognized Ottoman control over western Ukraine.

According to the chronicle of Mehmed Seyyid Riza, Murad decided to replace sharia law with Mongol law. Instead of referring to the khanate's chief judge with the Arabic-derived term kadıasker, he created a new term, töre başı, who was responsible for applying Chingisid law. This was an attempt to strengthen his own power in relation to the Ottomans, and as a rebuke to Islamic and Ottoman influence over Tatar society. However, these reforms were unpopular with his subjects and therefore short-lived, according to Riza's chronicle. The dervish Vani Mehmed Efendi played a role in the khan's decision to return to Islamic law.

In 1682 the Ottoman Empire went to war with the Holy Roman Empire. The Ottomans laid siege to the important city of Vienna. This led to the disastrous Ottoman defeat at the Battle of Vienna in 1683. The attempted siege was a catastrophe; various Ottoman officials looked to lay blame and under the recommendation of Kara Mustafa Pasha, Murad was removed. After returning from the hajj, Murad retired to an estate near Yambol in modern Bulgaria and died in 1696. He was followed by Haci II Giray, who reigned briefly until Selim was restored.

== Notes ==
=== Bibliography ===
- Królikowska-Jedlińska, Natalia (2018). Law and Division of Power in the Crimean Khanate (1532-1774): With Special Reference to the Reign of Murad Giray (1678-1683). BRILL. ISBN 978-90-04-38432-3.

Preceded by Selim I Giray (1st reign)	Khan of Crimea; 1678–1683	Succeeded by Haci II Giray
