= Battle of Lwów (1695) =

1695 battle during the Polish–Ottoman War

- Part of Great Turkish War and the Polish–Ottoman War
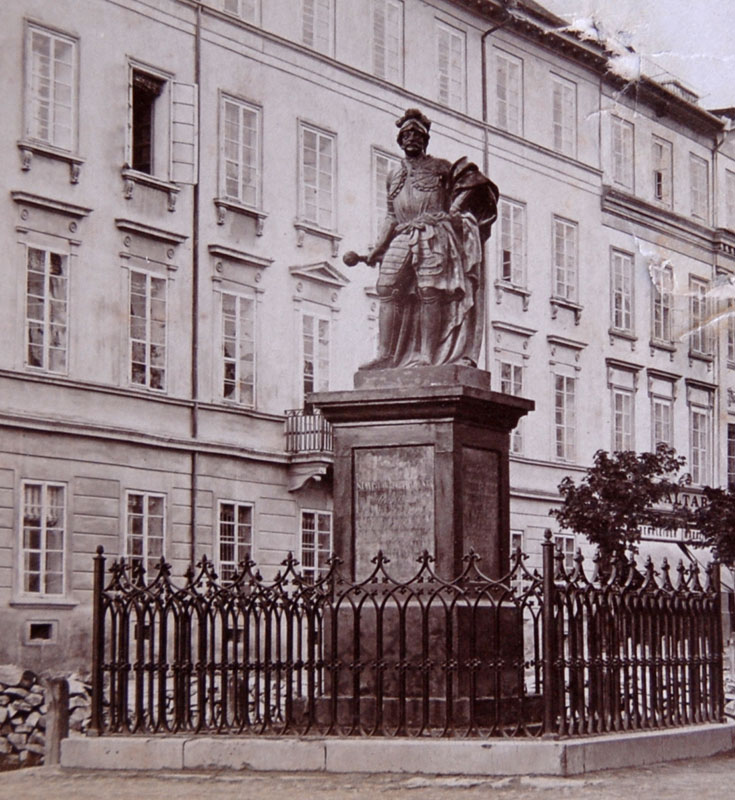
- Monument to Stanisław Jabłonowski in Lviv built by the city's residents in gratitude to the hetman for defending Lviv
Date	11–12 February 1695
Location	Lviv, Polish–Lithuanian Commonwealth (Now in Ukraine)
Result	Polish–Lithuanian victory

Belligerents
Polish–Lithuanian Commonwealth	Crimean Khanate

Commanders and leaders
Stanisław Jan Jabłonowski	Shahbaz Giray

Strength
About 4,000	8,000–12,000

Casualties and losses
400	400

Battle of Lwów was an armed clash that took place on February 11–12, 1695 during the Polish–Ottoman War (1683–1699).

== Prelude ==
At the beginning of 1695, the Tatars carried out another invasion of the Polish-Lithuanian Commonwealth, the aim of which was to attempt to terrorize Poland and force it to conclude a separatist peace with the Ottomans. The Tatars set off on January 18 from Budjak (near the mouth of the Dniester River), and were led by Sultan Shehbaz Giray, a son of Khan Selim I Giray.

The Tatars, with a force of 8-12 thousand Nogais and Crimean Tatars, broke the Polish siege of Kamianets-Podilskyi on January 29, delivering food to the starving fortress, then moved on, passing the Polish fortress in Złoczów on February 8. To everyone's surprise, the Tatar army marched in a compact column straight towards Lviv, contrary to their custom of fanning out along the way.

At that time, the surprised Grand Hetman Stanisław Jan Jabłonowski, upon hearing of the Tatars' appearance, issued mobilization orders and began a quick concentration of troops near Lviv, thanks to which he managed to gather about 4,000 soldiers near the city.

== Battle ==
The Tatars, wanting to take advantage of the surprise, contrary to their custom, did not set fire to the surrounding villages when approaching the city. Being close to their destination, the Tatars learned from a captured nobleman about the concentration of Polish troops, so they decided to attack Lviv from the north. By doing so, their sudden appearance on February 11 really surprised the Poles, and this was made easier by the fact that at that time there were noisy parties at some Magnates' weddings in Lviv.

After unsuccessful attacks on the bridge, the Tatars bypassed the Polish positions on the outskirts with part of their forces, forcing the Polish army, which were now threatened to be surrounded, to retreat to the very walls of Lviv. The retreat brought significant losses to the Poles, and a large group of Tatars managed to break through the gate into the city itself.
The situation became dramatic, so crowds of townspeople and local peasants rushed to the walls and towers. They shot at the Tatars not only with small arms, but also with arquebuses and falconets. Fierce fighting ensued and lasted until February 12. The Polish cavalry had to fight the Tatars in narrow streets. Behind the walls of the monasteries, dismounted cavalry fired at the attackers.

The Tatars were driven out of Lviv thanks to an organized counterattack, in which peasants armed with flails played a significant role . A dozen or so Tatars were knocked down by the blows of the flails and later taken prisoner. The invaders, who were not used to fight between buildings, were driven out of the city. The Tatars made further attempts to take over Lviv from another side, but without success.

Polish losses, excluding losses among volunteers, amounted to about 400 soldiers and were probably comparable to the Tatars.

== Aftermath ==
Only on the way back did the Tater Horde dissolve its traditional raids, plundering villages and taking captives. When the way back became a torment due to cold and hunger, their prisoners were ruthlessly murdered.
In general, the Tatar invasion was unsuccessful, and the way back through the desert- and snow-covered Budjak exposed the Tatars to the same torments that the Polish army had suffered during its expeditions to Moldavia. On the way back, the Tatars lost a large number of horses. In general, it was not the battle, but the difficult weather conditions that prevailed during the retreat, that inflicted the heaviest losses on the Horde, as most of the Tatars had to return on foot.

The Tatar expedition, which was supposed to force Poland to conclude a peace, ended in failure.
