= Saadet III Giray =

Khan of Crimea in 1691

Saadet III Giray (Note: Crimean Tatar, Ottoman Turkish and Persian: سعادت کرای ثالث) (reigned 1691, lived 1645–1695) was briefly khan of the Crimean Khanate between the second and third reigns of Selim I Giray. Oddly, he did not visit Crimea during his reign. He was the son of Kyrym Giray, one of the many sons of Selâmet I Giray. His brother Haci II Giray was briefly khan between the first and second reigns of Selim I Giray.

Saadet had been nureddin under his cousin Murad Giray, who ruled between the first and second reigns of Selim I. In 1691 Selim I abdicated and proposed his cousin Saadat as a replacement. Saadet chose as kalga and nureddin Devlet and Fetikh Giray (Devlet had been kalga since 1684 and became khan Devlet II Giray in 1699). Saadet, who was in Istanbul at this time, was immediately ordered to raise an army to fight the Austrians. He marched up the west shore of the Black Sea and forced the reluctant Budjak Horde to join him. The other Crimean and Nogai nobles were also reluctant. Devlet planned to betray him and was removed. Marching across Romania, he severely punished troops who abused the local population. Due to overlong preparations he arrived late at the Battle of Slankamen (19 August 1691) where the Turks were defeated. He was removed from office in December and exiled to Yambol in Bulgaria, and later to Rhodes (an Aegean island), where he died. He was followed by Safa Giray of Crimea who also had a short reign. After Safa, Selim became khan for the third time.

== Sources ==
- Henry Hoyle Howorth, History of the Mongols, 1880, Part 2, p. 565
- Олекса Гайворонский «Созвездие Гераев». Симферополь, 2003.
- In the absence of a proper source in English, this is mostly extracted from the Russian Wikipedia which apparently follows Gaivoronsky. Howorth is old and has only one paragraph.

Preceded by Selim I Giray (2nd reign)	Khan of Crimea; 1691	Succeeded by Safa Giray of Crimea
