= Crimean–Nogai slave raids in Eastern Europe =

Ottoman-backed Turkic invasions (1441–1774)

- Part of the Ottoman wars in Europe and the Russo-Crimean Wars
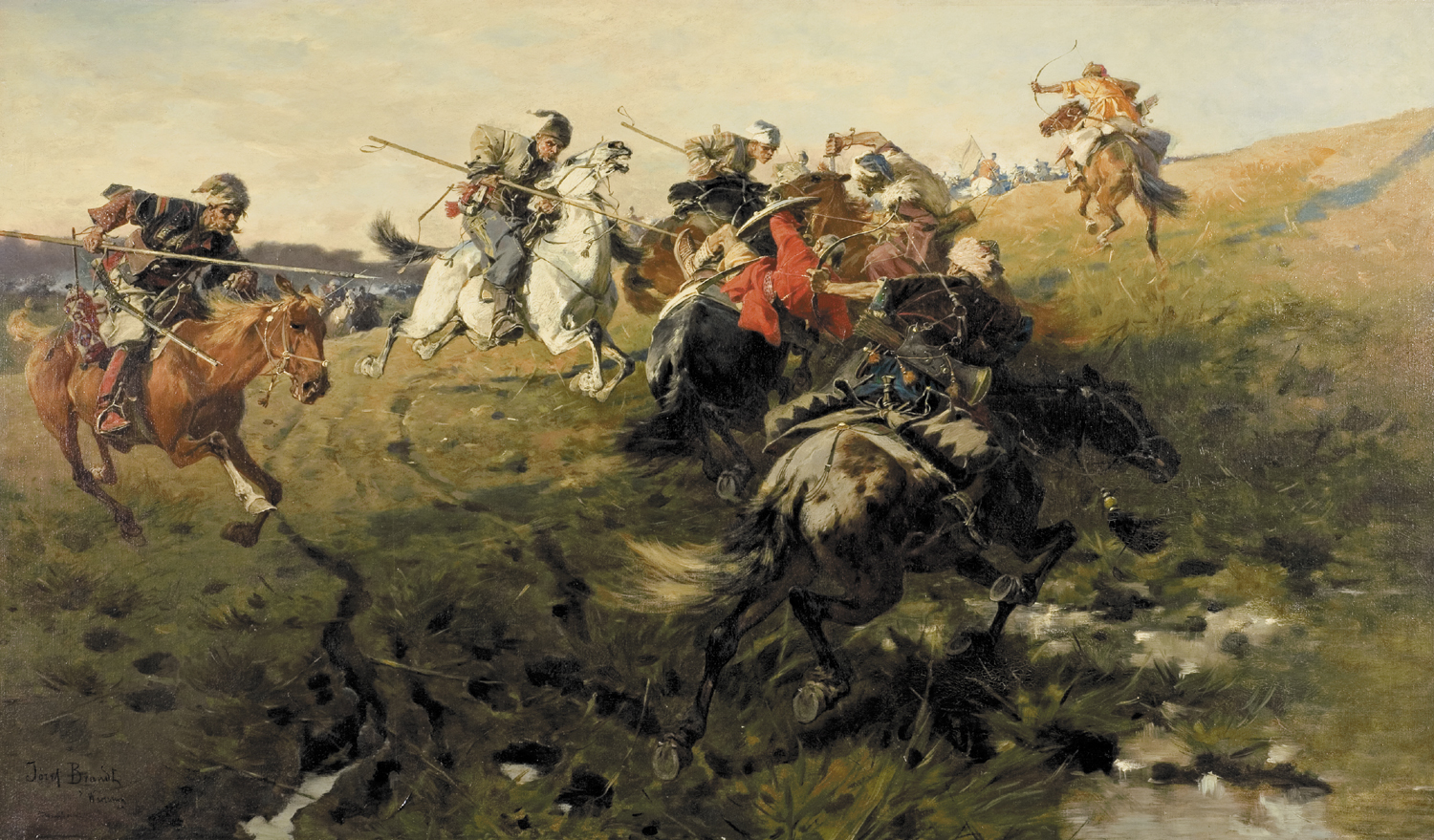
- Painting by Polish artist Józef Brandt depicting Cossacks engaged in combat with Tatars, c. 1890
Date	1441–1774 (333 years)
Location	Eastern Europe (Wild Fields), intermittently Central Europe and the Caucasus
Result	1 million - 5 million Europeans and Caucasians enslaved and traded in the Crimean market and the Ottoman market.; Emergence of the semi-militarized Cossacks and ensuing counter-raids against Crimean and Ottoman targets; Raids halted after the Russo-Turkish War of 1768–1774, followed by Russia's annexation of the Crimean Khanate and suppression of the Nogai Horde in 1783

Belligerents
Crimean Khanate; Nogai Horde; Support: Ottoman Empire; From time to time: Moldavia; Zaporozhian Sich; Cossack Hetmanate; Circassia	Russia: Grand Principality of Moscow (1441–1547); Tsardom of Russia (1547–1721); Russian Empire (1721–1774); Poland–Lithuania: Crown of the Kingdom of Poland (1441–1569); Grand Duchy of Lithuania (1441–1569); Polish–Lithuanian Commonwealth (1569–1774); Kingdom of Hungary From time to time: Moldavia; Zaporozhian Sich; Cossack Hetmanate; Circassia

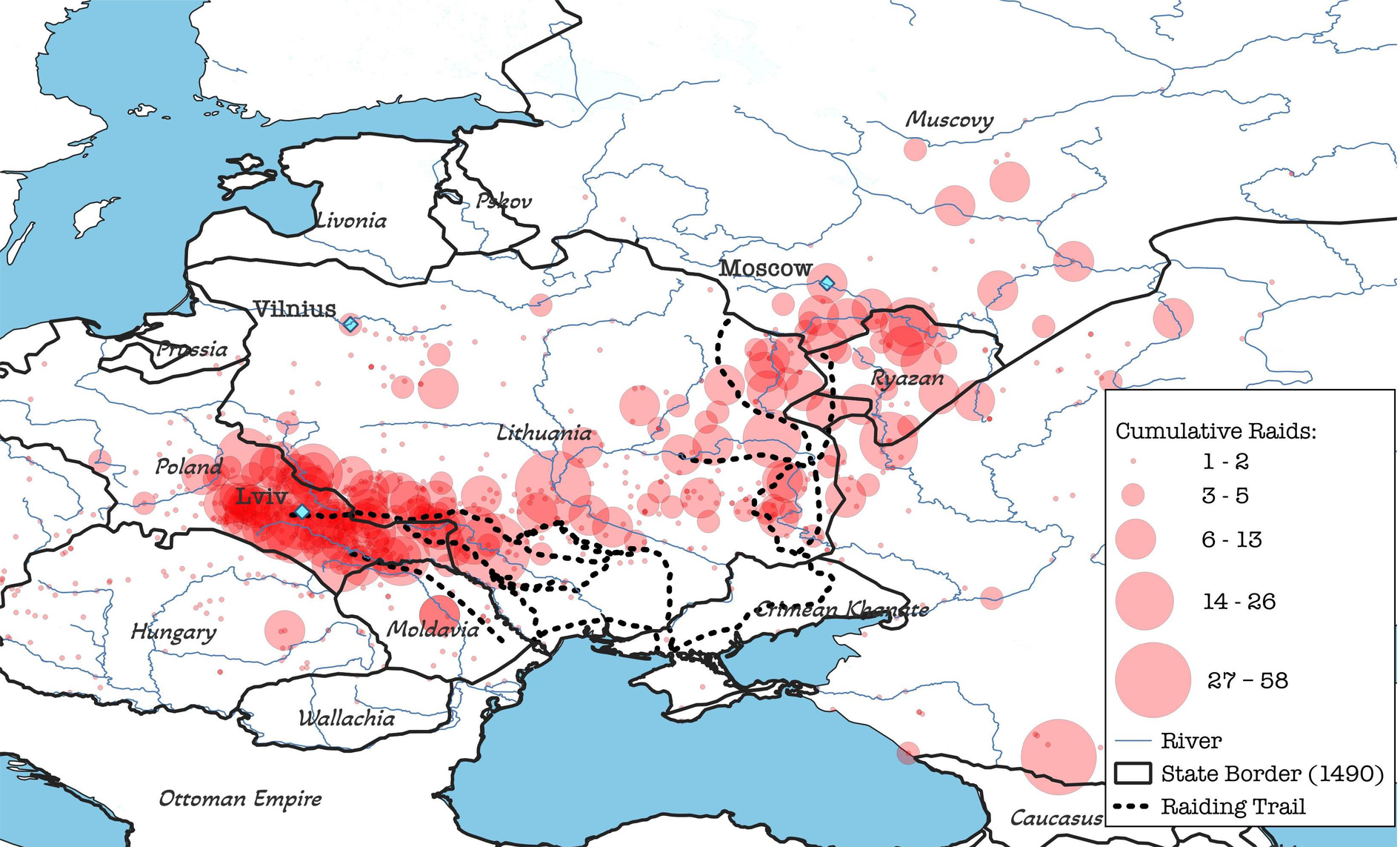
Locations of 2,511 raids in Eastern Europe between 1453 and 1774

Between 1441 and 1774, the Crimean Khanate and the Nogai Horde conducted raids throughout lands primarily controlled by Russia (Note: Russia underwent a series of political changes in the period of the raids. The Grand Duchy of Moscow overthrew Turco-Mongol lordship, and expanded into the Tsardom of Russia in 1547. From 1721, following the reforms of Peter the Great, it was the Russian Empire.) and Poland–Lithuania. (Note: Poland and Lithuania were in personal union after 1385. In 1569, Poland and Lithuania formed the Polish–Lithuanian Commonwealth.) Concentrated in Eastern Europe, but also stretching to the Caucasus and parts of Central Europe, these raids were often supported by the Ottoman Empire and involved the transportation of captives to the Muslim world, where they were put on the market and sold as part of the Crimean slave trade and the Ottoman slave trade. The regular abductions of people over the course of numerous incursions by the Crimeans and the Nogais greatly drained Eastern Europe's human and economic resources, consequently playing an important role in the emergence of the semi-militarized Cossacks, who organized retaliatory campaigns against the raiders and their Ottoman backers.

Trading posts in Crimea had previously been established by the Genoese and the Venetians to facilitate earlier Western European slave routes. The Crimean–Nogai raids largely targeted the "Wild Fields" of the Pontic–Caspian steppe, which extends about 800 kilometres (500 mi) north of the Black Sea and which now contains the majority of the combined population of southeastern Ukraine and southwestern Russia.

Figures for the total number of Europeans affected by the raids vary: Polish historian Bohdan Baranowski estimated that the Polish–Lithuanian Commonwealth (modern-day Poland, Lithuania, Latvia, Estonia, Ukraine, and Belarus) lost an average of 20,000 people yearly and as many as one million people from 1474 to 1694. Ukrainian-American historian Mikhail Khodarkhovsky estimates that 150,000 to 200,000 people were abducted from Russian-controlled lands in the first half of the 17th century.

The first major raid occurred in 1468 and was directed at southeastern Poland. In 1769, Tatars conducted one last significant raid and captured 20,000 slaves during the Russo-Turkish War of 1768–1774, which ended with the Ottomans' cession of territory in what is now southern Ukraine, followed by the Crimean Khanate's annexation by the Russian Empire in 1783. That same year, Russia suppressed the Kuban Nogai uprising, bringing an end to the slave raids and commencing the colonization of Crimea.

== Pretext ==
=== Geography and landscape ===
The steppes of southern Eurasia are flat and most of its societies were either nomadic or semi-nomadic, even those based in urban centers, like Kazan, Crimea, and Astrakhan.

Given the mobility of nomadic nations, warfare and slave trade proved more lucrative than trade because of the wide-open terrain. Additionally, the decentralized and fractious powers that Russia encountered on its eastern and southern borders were organized for war, leaving East Slavic lands in a constant state of warfare with numerous potential invaders. Armed mainly with spears, bows, and sabres, raiders could travel for hundreds of miles across an open steppe landscape with no natural impediment like mountain ranges, attack villages with little warning, and then leave with captives. Traveling light and on horseback, the main concern of the Tatars was finding sufficient fodder for their horses. Sedentary farming societies, with or without a powerful army, were easy prey for the highly mobile raiders.

Security on the steppe's wide-open terrain remained precarious and in ever-present danger. Even in the mid-18th century, with greater security at the southern frontier, Russian peasants there continued to farm their lands fully armed, often superficially indistinguishable from Cossacks.

=== Economic incentives ===
Most of the raids fell on territory of today's Russia and Ukraine – lands previously divided between the Grand Duchy of Moscow and the Duchy of Lithuania, although some fell on Moldavia and Circassia (North Caucasus).

The main economic goal of the raids was booty, some of it material, but most of it human. These human trade goods were mostly sold on to the Ottoman Empire, although some remained in Crimea. Slaves and freedmen formed approximately 75% of the Crimean population. According to the Encyclopædia Britannica, "It is known that for every slave the Crimeans sold in the market, they killed outright several other people during their raids, and a couple more died on the way to the slave market." The main slave market was Caffa which after 1475 was part of the coastal strip of Crimea that belonged to the Ottomans. In the 1570s close to 20,000 slaves a year went on sale in Caffa.

=== Political environment ===
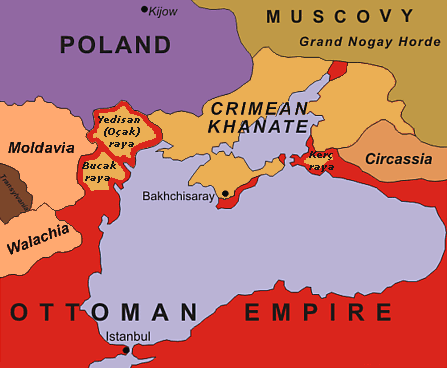
The Crimean Khanate in the early 17th century. Note that the areas marked Poland and especially Muscovy were claimed rather than administered and were thinly populated.

The Crimean Khanate broke off from the Golden Horde in 1441. When the Horde came to an end in 1502, the buffer between Crimea and its northern neighbors disappeared. The Khans took advantage of the conflicts between Lithuania and Moscow, allying now with one, then with the other, and using the alliance with one as a justification to attack the other. During the Russo-Lithuanian War of 1500–1506 the Crimeans were allied with Russia and penetrated deep into Lithuania. Relations soon deteriorated. Near continuous raids on Muscovy began in 1507.

Crimean Khan Devlet I Giray burnt down Moscow during the 1571 campaign. Contemporaries counted up to 80,000 victims of the Tatar invasion in 1571, with 150,000 Russians taken as captives. Ivan the Terrible, having learnt that Crimean Khanate army was approaching Moscow, fled from Moscow to Kolomna with his oprichniks.

After the burning of Moscow, Devlet Giray Khan, supported by the Ottoman Empire, invaded Russia again in 1572. The combined force of Tatars and Turks, however, was defeated in the Battle of Molodi by the Russian army, led by Prince Mikhail Vorotynsky and Prince Dmitriy Khvorostinin.

In 1620, Tatars took part in the Battle of Cecora, where they vastly contributed to the crushing victory of the Turks over the Poles-Lithuanians. In 1672, Khan Selim I Giray was assigned to join Ottoman army during the Polish–Ottoman War (1672–76) in which he was successful in the conquest of Bar.

== Raids and conflict ==
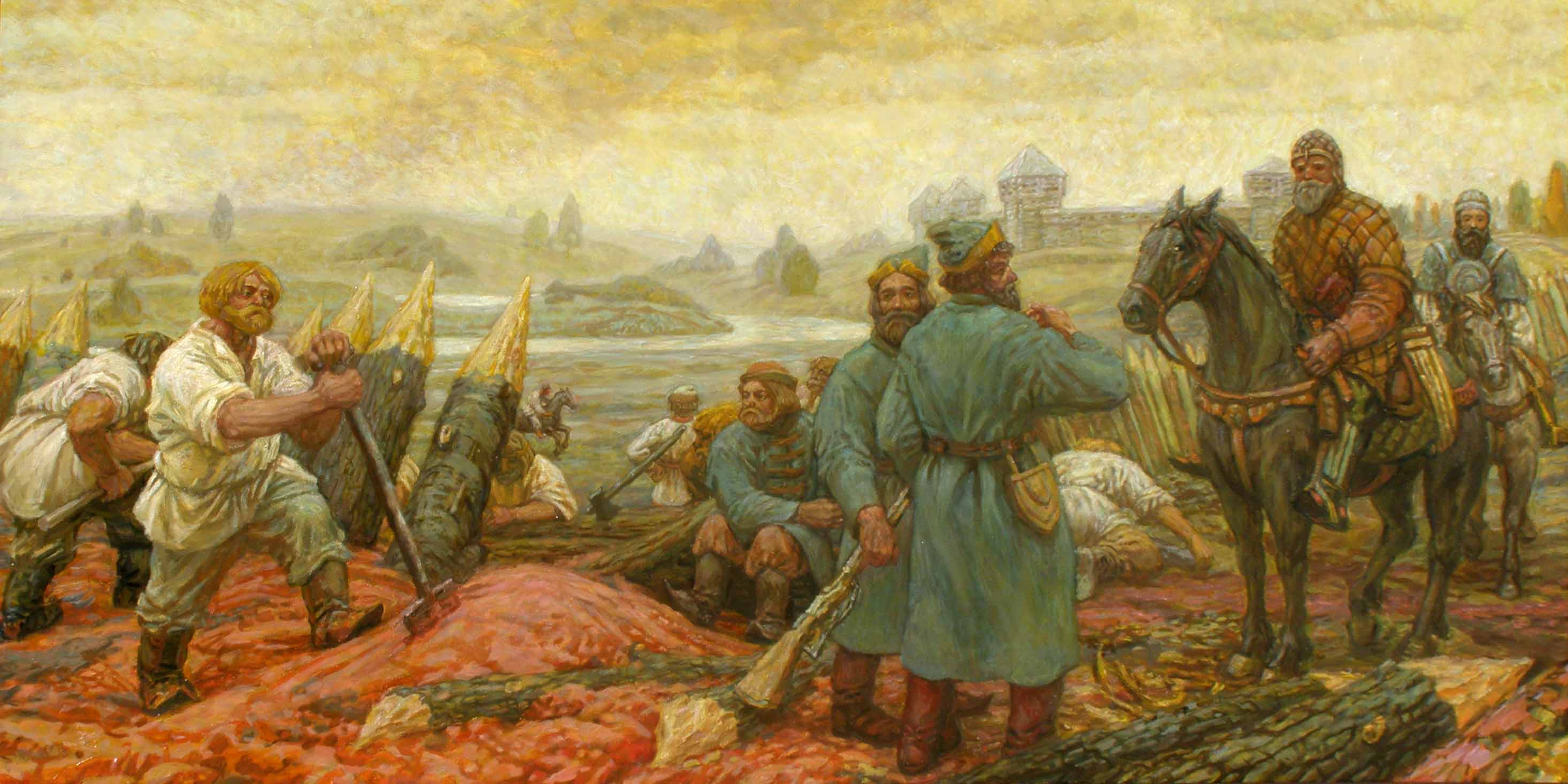
Depiction of the Great Abatis Border by Max Presnyakov (2010). This chain of fortification lines was constructed to protect Russia's subjects from the Crimeans and the Nogais, who, rapidly moving along the Muravsky Trail, ravaged the nation's southern provinces.

=== Theatres of war ===
At the beginning of this period, almost 700 miles of sparsely populated grassland – the so-called Wild Fields – separated the Crimean Khanate from the Duchy of Moscow. The Oka River, 40 miles south of Moscow, was the city's principal and northernmost line of defense, guarded by the Beregovaya Sluzhba ("river-bank service"). These guards remained in place there after the construction of the Belgorod Line far to the south. They rarely crossed the Oka in that direction, even when the southward fortresses suffered massive attacks.

Three main routes, called trails, traversed the terrain between Muscovy and Crimea. To minimize the necessity of fording rivers, the trails generally followed the high ground between them. (Note: A slightly different account of the three trails is given in the Muravsky Trail article)

=== Slavery in the Crimean and Ottoman markets ===
Caffa, which belonged to the Ottoman Empire after 1475, was Crimea's main slave market. Artillery and a strong garrison of Janissaries protected the city. The Crimean towns of Karasubazar, Bakhchysarai and Khazleve also sold slaves. The slave dealers were Turks, Arabs, Greeks, Armenians and Jews, and both the Crimean khan and the Turkish pasha taxed them in exchange for that right. Caffa sometimes had as many as 30,000 slaves, most of whom came from Muscovy and the southeastern lands of the Polish–Lithuanian Commonwealth. Sigismund von Herberstein, who was a Habsburg diplomat and the Holy Roman Empire's ambassador to Muscovy, wrote that "old and infirmed men, who will not fetch much at a sale, are given up to the Tatar youths, either to be stoned, or to be thrown into the sea, or to be killed by any sort of death they might please." In 1630, a Lithuanian named Michalo Lituanus wrote:

Among these unfortunates [Slavic slaves] there are many strong ones; if they [Tatars] have not castrated them yet, they cut off their ears and nostrils, burned cheeks and foreheads with the burning iron and forced them to work with their chains and shackles during the daylight, and sit in the prisons during the night; they are sustained by the meager food consisting of the dead animals’ meat, rotten, full of worms, which even a dog would not eat. The youngest women are kept for wanton pleasures.

Alan W. Fisher describes the fate of the slaves:

"The first ordeal [of the captive] was the long march to the Crimea. Often in chains and always on foot, many of the captives died en route. Since on many occasions the Tatar raiding party feared reprisals or, in the seventeenth century, attempts by Cossack bands to free the captives, the marches were hurried. Ill or wounded captives were usually killed rather than be allowed to slow the procession. An Ottoman traveler in the mid-sixteenth century who witnessed one such march of captives from Galicia marveled that any would reach their destination—the slave markets of Kefe. He complained that their treatment was so bad that the mortality rate would unnecessarily drive their price up beyond the reach of potential buyers such as himself. A Polish proverb stated: “Oh how much better to lie on one's bier, than to be a captive on the way to Tartary.”

According to Ukrainian-Canadian historian Orest Subtelny, "from 1450 to 1586, eighty-six raids were recorded, and from 1600 to 1647, seventy. Although estimates of the number of captives taken in a single raid reached as high as 30,000, the average figure was closer to 3000...In Podilia alone, about one-third of all the villages were devastated or abandoned between 1578 and 1583."

=== European human losses ===
According to some estimates, the total amount of slaves seized from the territory of Polish–Lithuanian Commonwealth during 1500–1700 was 1 million; at least 50% of which are believed to have been ethnic Poles. In the first half of the 17th century alone, an estimated 150 to 200 thousand people were taken into slavery from the territory of the Moscow State. These figures do not take into account those who were killed during the attacks.

The largest captures of slaves occurred in the Dnieper, Podolia, Volhynia, and Galicia regions, with more than a million people taken from these lands between 1500 and 1644. During the second half of the 17th century, these regions saw numerous wars with Tatar participation, suggesting an extremely high number of yasyr (captives) during this period. In 1676, for example, 40 thousand people were taken away in Volhynia, Podolia, and Galicia. After the Azov campaigns of Peter I in the 18th century, the raids became smaller and were mostly carried out in the Dnieper region, the Azov region, and the Don, by both the Tatars and the Cossacks in both directions. The last major raid in Hungary occurred in 1717.

== See also ==
- Cossack raids
- Barbary slave trade
  - Turkish Abductions
- Slavery in the Ottoman Empire
- Kazakh Khanate § Slave trade on Russian settlement
- List of Mongol and Tatar attacks in Europe
- History of slavery in the Muslim world
- Kazakh raids into Russia
- Barbary slave trade

== Bibliography ==
- Davies, Brian (2014). Warfare, State and Society on the Black Sea Steppe, 1500–1700. Routledge. ISBN 978-1134552832. OCLC 878862541.
- Khodarkovsky, Mikhail (2002). Russia's Steppe Frontier: The Making of a Colonial Empire, 1500-1800. Indiana University Press. ISBN 9780253217707. OCLC 838191905.
