= Haci II Giray =

Khan of Crimea from 1683 to 1684

Haji II Giray (Note: Crimean Tatar, Ottoman Turkish and Persian: حاجی کرای ثانی) (1644–1689) was briefly khan of the Crimean khanate, from 1683 to 1684. He was the son of Kyrym Giray, one of the many sons of Selâmet I Giray. He was khan between the first and second reigns of his cousin Selim I Giray. His brother Saadet III Giray became khan in 1691. None of his descendants were khans. Three of his uncles were khans.

During the first reign of his cousin Selim I Giray (1671–1678) he helped the Turks against the Austrians and was praised for his bravery. In 1678 Selim was replaced by another cousin Murad Giray because of a military failure. In 1683 Murad was removed because of his part in the disaster at Vienna.

When the 39-year-old Haji came to the throne he appointed as kalga and nureddin Devlet and Azamat Giray, two sons of Selim I. (Devlet later became khan Devlet II Giray). In late 1683 the Crimeans defeated Stefan Kunicki who had attacked the Budjak Horde. For some reason, he cancelled the payments due to the Crimean nobles. The rebellious nobles occupied the palace at Bakhchisarai and requested that the Turks restore Selim I. Haji fled to the Mangup fortress and then to Turkey. He died in Rhodes in 1689. Howorth suggested that the sons of Selim were involved in his overthrow.

== Sources and footnotes ==
- Henry Hoyle Howorth, History of the Mongols, 1880, Part 2, pp. 563
- Олекса Гайворонский «Созвездие Гераев». Симферополь, 2003.

Preceded by Murad Giray	Khan of Crimea; 1683–1684	Succeeded by Selim I Giray (2nd reign)
