= Safa Giray of Crimea =

Khan of Crimea from 1691 to 1692

Safa Giray of Crimea (Note: Crimean Tatar, Ottoman Turkish and Persian: صفا کرای) (1637–1703) was briefly khan of the Crimean Khanate (1691–92), between the second and third reigns of his cousin Selim I Giray. His father was Safa Giray (died 1637), one of the many sons of Khan Selâmet I Giray.

In 1691 Selim I resigned and was replaced by Saadet III Giray who, after less than a year, was removed by the Turks for military incompetence and replaced by Safa (December 1691). As Kalga and Nureddin he retained Devlet and Shahin Giray. He quickly became unpopular. He was accused of drunkenness, extortion, trading in soap and fish and tax farming. When the Ottomans called him to fight the Habsburgs most of the boys refused to go with him and the few who did gradually drifted away. The Crimeans requested that Selim I be restored, which was done. (October 1692). Safa settled on the isle of Rhodes, where he continued to trade. In 1703 he died in Karnobat in modern Bulgaria and was buried in the courtyard of the local mosque.

== Sources ==
- Henry Hoyle Howorth, History of the Mongols, 1880, Part 2, p. 565
- Олекса Гайворонский «Созвездие Гераев». Симферополь, 2003.
- In the absence of a proper source in English, this is mostly extracted from the Russian Wikipedia which apparently follows Gaivoronsky. Howorth is old and has only one paragraph.

Preceded by Saadet III Giray	Khan of Crimea; 1691–1692	Succeeded by Selim I Giray (3rd reign)
