= Kazakh raids into Russia =

Kazakh-Russian conflict in West Siberia

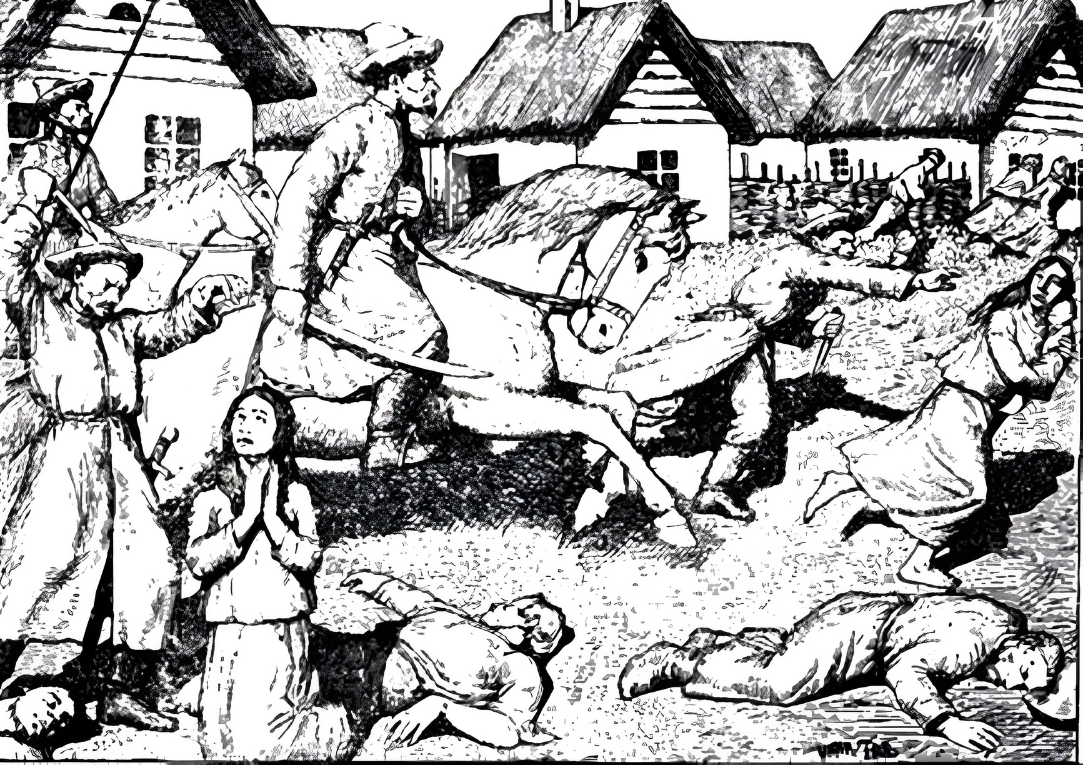
Attack on the Volga German colony of Chasselois by Kazakhs (1785)

The Kazakh-Russian conflicts of the 17th–18th centuries were a series of armed confrontations between the Kazakh Khanate and the Tsardom of Russia, later the Russian Empire, as well as their subjects: the Cossacks, Bashkirs, and Kalmyks. There were mutual raids, looting, and the abduction of people into slavery. The raids began during the reign of Tauke Khan in 1690 and continued intermittently until the end of the 18th century. Isolated raids also occurred in the early and late 19th century.

== Background ==
In 1687, for the first time after a long hiatus, attempts were made to renew diplomatic relations between the Kazakh Khanate and the Tsardom of Russia. Tauke Khan sent an embassy to Tobolsk, led by the Tashim Batyr, bearing gifts and a letter to Moscow. The embassy aimed to restore previous political and trade ties. The next embassy was sent in 1689-1690, headed by Tumanchi Batyr. However, no agreements were signed. Despite Tauke Khan's efforts to establish relations with the Russian Tsardom, Kazakh raids on Russian subjects began. For instance, during the winter of 1689/1690, a raid was carried out on a Russian merchant caravan led by Kashka. Tauke denied his involvement and promised to capture and punish the raiders.

According to V. Ya. Basin, the causes of the conflict were frequent raids by Cossack communities on the Kazakh steppe, capturing a significant number of prisoners, cattle, and horses, as well as the advance of tsarist forces deep into Kazakh lands. Basin argues that "therefore, the Kazakh raids were not 'banditry' but rather an offensive-defensive tactic, stemming from the specific nature of their resistance to tsarism". R. D. Temirgaliyev believes that Kazakh khans claimed control over groups of Siberian Tatars, whom the Russian authorities, in turn, considered their subjects. Historian E. A. Abil suggests that the descendants of the nomadic subjects of the Khanate of Sibir, who later became subjects of Tauke Khan, viewed the pastures in southern Western Siberia as their ancestral territory and frequently raided Siberian settlements, merchants, and salt producers against the khan's wishes.

== Kazakh raids on Cossack settlements ==
=== 1690 ===
According to the Yesipov Chronicle, the Kazakhs approached a fort undetected. On the night of 2 August 1690, they stormed and plundered the fort, capturing two Russian servicemen from Tyumen and about 30 local men and women, killing around 20 Tarkhan Tatars, and seizing horses and livestock. On 4 August, a large detachment of over 700 men set out in pursuit from Tobolsk and Tyumen, led by A. V. Klepikov, consisting of boyar sons, mounted Cossacks, and Siberian Tatars. The detachment tracked the Kazakh forces for 38 days but was unable to locate them.

In November 1690, another embassy was sent to Tobolsk, headed by Kabai, to resolve issues that had arisen due to mutual raids. At the same time, negotiations were held at Lake Yamyshev between representatives of the Tobolsk administration, headed by steward Pavel Sharygin, and prominent Kazakh murzas Sary and Keldei, who were sent by the khan to sign a trade agreement on the terms of Central Asian merchant mediation. However, due to an attack on Russian hunters on the banks of the Irtysh, Sary and Keldei were captured and taken to Tobolsk, where Sary soon died. Keldei remained imprisoned.

=== 1691 ===
In July 1691, according to the Yesipov Chronicle, “the military forces of the Cossack (Kazakh) Horde, Muslims, captured two settlements under the jurisdiction of Tobolsk - Utyatskaya and Kamyshevskaya - on the Tobol River. In these settlements, they burned the Tobolsk bailiff Spiridon Rachkovsky, a boyar’s son, along with his wife, children, and many local Cossacks and peasants with their wives and children within the yard, and killed others and captured about two hundred people.” According to N. A. Abramov, the Tsarevo settlement, which later became the city of Kurgan, was also pillaged at that time In the autumn, another embassy was sent to Tobolsk, again led by Tumanchi and Kabai, who conveyed the khan's disapproval of the raids.

=== 1692 ===
In June 1692, Kazakhs and Karakalpaks again attacked villages and settlements around the Tsarevo settlement on the Tobol river, pillaging twenty households in the Utyatskaya settlement, beating peasants and capturing their families. The Kazakh forces were intercepted near the Tsarevo settlement by a centurion and a hundred local Cossacks. In the ensuing battle, the centurion and 40 Cossacks were killed. A detachment of 600 men led by Tobolsk resident Fyodor Tutolmin, consisting of boyar sons, mounted Cossacks, Tyumen Tatars, and local Cossacks, was sent in pursuit but failed to catch the Kazakhs. The Holstein diplomat Eberhard Isbrand Ides wrote that in June, the Kazakh forces were within 15 miles of Tyumen.

In an effort to resolve the situation, in July 1692, the Russian authorities sent an embassy to Turkestan, headed by boyar's son Andrei Nepripaskov, accompanied by Cossack Vasily Kobyakov. The embassy was received in the presence of representatives from most clans. The khan no longer promised to punish the raiders and instead accused the Russian authorities of illegally detaining Sary and Keldei. The embassy refused to guarantee Keldei's release, demanding the unconditional release of the Russia captives and threatening war. In response, the Kazakh nobility demanded a severance of all relations. The embassy was taken captive and the raids continued.

=== 1693 ===
On 15 July 1693, Kazakhs and Karakalpaks attacked the villages of the Yalutorovsk settlement, killing 42 local Cossacks and peasants and capturing 69. Vasily Shulgin, having gathered the Tobolsk boyar sons, mounted Cossacks, Tatars, local Cossacks, and peasant hunters from various settlements, set out into the steppe on 25 July, not waiting for Ivan Molchanov's reinforcements. Previously, the Kazakhs had always avoided confrontation with the main forces, so an early departure was necessary. According to the Yesipov Chronicle, Shulgin managed to assemble a force of 318 men, not counting hunters and residents from other settlements. The Naryshkin List of the Siberian Chronicle adds that Shulgin's group included 50 Tobolsk boyar sons, 60 mounted Cossacks from Lithuanian and newly converted groups, 45 Tatars, and an additional 172 local Cossacks and “willing peasants” from the Yalutorovsk and Suyer settlements, not counting hunters from other settlements.

On 27 July, Shulgin encountered the Kazakh Khanate's forces near Lake Semiskul. The Russians’ gunpowder cart broke down, forcing them to take a defensive position in the open steppe. A heavy rain started, soaking their guns. The Kazakhs and Karakalpaks launched a lance attack, and nearly all the Russian forces were killed. Shulgin and his brothers Yakov and Ivan perished. According to survivors who escaped captivity, they faced around three thousand opponents. The Yesipov Chronicle records Shulgin's force's losses at 357 killed and 14 captured, who later escaped; they reported the events to Molchanov, who was on his way to assist but arrived too late and returned to Yalutorovsk, where he remained until autumn.

Following the defeat of the main Russian forces in Siberia, the settlements and towns along the Iset and Tobol Rivers, including the Siberian capital of Tobolsk, faced a new threat. Fortifications and guard posts in towns and forts were strengthened.

==== Irtysh River raid ====
Simultaneously with battle on the Tobol River, another Kazakh detachment led by Sultans Ablay and Kazy burned down the recently established Shipitsyna (Takmyk) settlement on the Irtysh River above Tara in July 1693 and took captives. Sultan Kazy himself told the ambassador Skibin that he had led 1,200 men to plunder Shipitsyna. The Kazakhs failed to capture the fort, but they caused significant destruction in the settlement with a large fire.

=== 1693 to 1700 ===
Tauke Khan continued to send envoys to Tobolsk with letters to the Russian tsar, denying his involvement in the raids and demanding the release of Kelday. In October 1693, he wrote: “From Adam’s time until now, such a matter has not been heard of, that an envoy should be detained for bandits.” The Khan promised to release the embassy of Andrei Nepripasov and Vasily Kobyakov in exchange for the release of Murza Kelday, also expressing desire to renew trade and diplomatic relations after the exchange. In his letter, Tauke condemned the raids conducted by his subjects Sultan Kazy and the Karakalpaks on Siberian settlements, adding, “I strongly rebuked them for such an evil deed and shamed them, telling them that they should prosper in their lands, while we remain here. We do not favor nor need such evil banditry and misdeeds, nor do we approve of such follies occurring between realms.”

In 1694, the Tobolsk authorities released Kelday, rewarding him with valuable gifts, and sent another embassy to Tauke Khan led by Fyodor Skibin and Matvey Troshin. The primary mission of this embassy was to secure the release of the previous envoys, Andrei Nepripasov and Vasily Kobyakov. However, these envoys faced harsh treatment and were held for an extended period. Nepripasov died in captivity, while his companions had to escape through a roundabout route via Bukhara. Kazakh raids became less intense; in 1694, they were limited to attacks on the Chumlyatskaya settlement along the Miass River on 14 May and 9 August. Over 200 attackers besieged the fort and captured 34 residents. From 1695 to 1699, there were a series of minor raids on the Utyatskaya settlement.

In the Map Book of Siberia (1699–1701), on the map of the city of Tara's surroundings, Semyon Remezov noted repeated Kazakh attacks on the Tukule volost and their incursions into the Tara, Baraba, and Tyumen districts.

The raids of the 1690s covered a stretch of land nearly a thousand kilometers long. The governors of Tobolsk, S. I. Saltykov and A. F. Naryshkin, reported: “In the years 198, 199, 200, 202, and 203, Kazakh hordes and Karakalpak warriors invaded the Tobolsk district, attacking Tarkhansky fort, Yalutorovskaya, Tsarevo Gorodishche, Utyatskaya, Chumlyatskaya, Ishim’s Korkina settlements, the village of Voskresenskoye under the Metropolia, and the Yamyshevo Lake anchorage, killing many Russian servicemen, Tatars, peasants, and yasak people, taking them and their families into captivity and driving off livestock.” Based on surviving records, Kazakh forces captured over 432 people during the raids of the 1690s. Hundreds of cattle and horses were seized, and hundreds of servicemen and civilians from southern Western Siberia were killed.

The Kazakhs and Karakalpaks mainly sold captives to Central Asian states. According to the Russian envoys Fyodor Skibin and Matvey Troshin, by 1694, over a thousand Russian captives taken by nomads were held as slaves in Bukhara alone, with over two thousand more from the Russian Tsardom in Khiva.

=== 1700 to 1703 ===
In 1701, five raids were carried out. Kazakh detachments besieged the Chumlyatskaya and Utyatskaya settlements, burned the Ust-Uyskoye village belonging to the Dalmat Monastery, and captured peasants near the villages of Smolina in Tsarevo Gorodishche and Slobodchikova in the Ymurtskaya settlement. In 1703, the village of Arkhipova, located 13 versts from Ymurtskaya settlement, was plundered. A detachment of settlement dragoons from the Tobolsk regiment pursued the Kazakh raiders into the steppe and succeeded in freeing the captives.

Fearing further raids, residents abandoned the village of Arkhipova and moved to more protected areas. The settlement remained deserted even by the time the Russian-German historian Gerhard Friedrich Müller's survey was conducted in 1741. At the request of residents threatened by raids, some villagers were relocated to the Russian side of the Tobol River. Moving the most threatened settlements across the Tobol reduced the risk of raids in the northern part of the Middle Tobol region, but the colonization of this area was put on hold for several decades.

=== Northern raids by the Kazakhs (1702–1727) ===
From 1702 to 1714, Kazakh troops attacked large Cossack convoys carrying grain and fish several times as they traveled from the Volga region to Yaikskaya Gorodok.

In 1709, the Kazakhs captured a huge Cossack convoy heading for Syzran.

In 1710, the Kazakhs launched a series of raids on Russian settlements that continued until 1716, even as peace negotiations, trade arrangements, and discussions on joint action against the Dzungars were taking place. Attacks on settlements and villages were recorded in 1710, 1711, 1713, and 1716.

In 1711, a 16,000-strong Kazakh detachment destroyed a grain convoy heading for Yaik Town, and 300 Cossacks were captured and sold to Khiva.

In 1713, a detachment of 800 Kazakhs captured a fish convoy heading for Samara. In the same year, a Kazakh detachment attacked the Yaik settlement and stole 4,000 horses. Over the next three years, there were further attacks by Kazakhs on Cossack convoys and detachments.

In 1714, 6,000 Kazakhs attacked a large Cossack settlement equipped for salt extraction in the steppe and laid siege to it. The Cossacks took up a circular defense and spent six days under siege, repelling the Kazakh attacks. In the fighting, the stanitsa garrison lost 20 men killed and captured.

In 1715, the Kazakhs attacked another Cossack convoy that had left Syzran. During the attack, 20 Cossacks were killed and 100 were taken prisoner.

In 1717, a detachment of 600 Kazakhs attacked the Yaik settlement and drove off 300 horses, capturing seven Cossacks who were with the herd. In the same year, Kazakhs and Karakalpaks, numbering about 25,000 people, attempted to capture the Yaik settlement and laid siege to it. However, they failed and retreated to the steppe.

In June 1724, a grain convoy from Samara was destroyed near the town. During the battle, 68 Cossacks were killed and captured. Then, on the Utva River, the Kazakhs defeated a detachment of 700 Cossacks under the command of Ivan Loginov. Seventy-two Cossacks were killed in battle, and many were taken prisoner. The Kazakhs caught up with Nikifor Borodin's detachment, killing and capturing 32 people.

== Kazakh slave trade ==
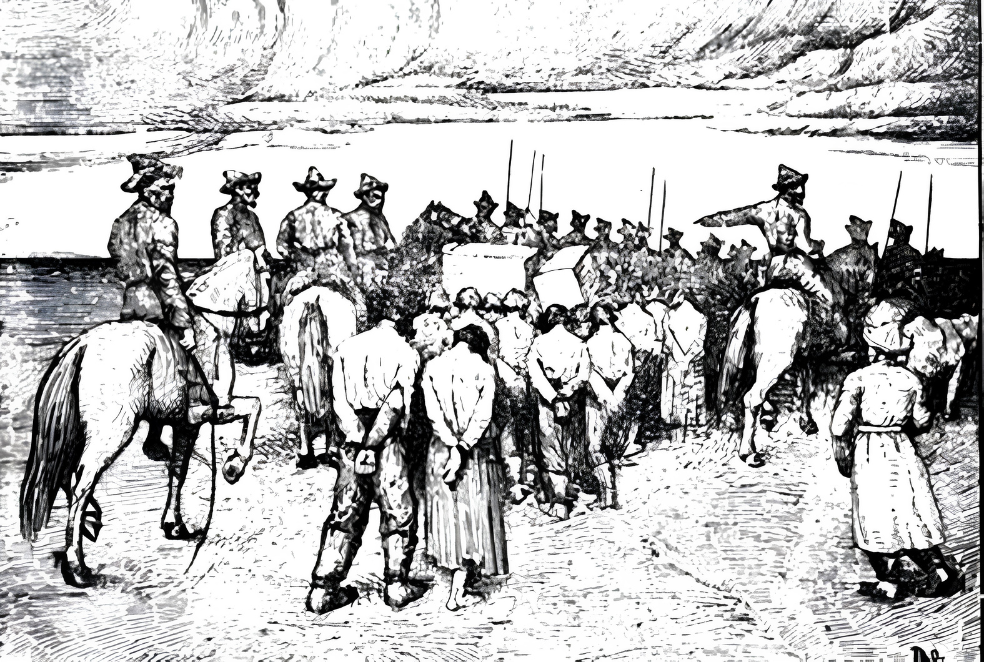
Kazakh raiders leading captive Volga German colonists into slavery

Kazakh raids into Russian territory fueled the Central Asian slave trade, providing a steady supply of captives for the Bukhara and Khivan slave trade.

During the 18th century, raids by Kazakhs on Russia's territory of Orenburg were common; the Kazakhs captured many Russians and sold them as slaves in the Central Asian market. The Volga Germans were also victims of Kazakh raids; they were ethnic Germans living along the River Volga in the region of southeastern European Russia around Saratov.

In 1717, 3,000 Russian slaves, men, women, and children, were sold in Khiva by Kazakh and Kyrgyz tribesmen.

In 1722, they stole cattle, robbed from Russian villages and people trapped in captivity and sold in the slave markets of Central Asia (in 1722 in Bukhara there were over 5,000 Russian prisoners). In the middle of the 17th century, 500 Russians were annually sold to Khiva by Kazakhs.

In 1730, the Kazakhs' frequent raids into Russian lands were a constant irritant and resulted in the enslavement of many of the Tsar's subjects, who were sold on the Kazakh steppe.

In 1736, urged on by Kirilov, the Kazakhs of the Lesser and Middle Hordes launched raids into Bashkir lands, killing or capturing many Bashkirs in the Siberian and Nogay districts.

In 1743, an order was given by the Senate in response to the failure to defend against the Kazakh attack on a Russian settlement, which resulted in 14 Russians killed, 24 wounded. In addition, 96 Cossacks were captured by Kazakhs.

In 1755, Nepliuev tried to enlist Kazakh support by ending the reprisal raids and promising that the Kazakhs could keep the Bashkir women and children living among them (a long-standing point of contention between Nepliuev and Khan Nurali of the Junior Jüz). Thousands of Bashkirs would be massacred or taken captive by Kazakhs over the course of the uprising, whether in an effort to demonstrate loyalty to the Tsarist state, or as a purely opportunistic maneuver.

In the period between 1764 and 1803, according to data collected by the Orenburg Commission, twenty Russian caravans were attacked and plundered. Kazakh raiders attacked even big caravans which were accompanied by numerous guards.

In spring 1774, the Russians demanded the Khan return 256 Russians captured by a recent Kazakh raid.

In summer 1774, when Russian troops in the Kazan region were suppressing the rebellion led by the Cossack leader Pugachev, the Kazakhs launched more than 240 raids and captured many Russians and herds along the border of Orenburg.

In 1799, the biggest Russian caravan which was plundered at that time lost goods worth 295,000 rubles.

By 1830, the Russian government estimated that two hundred Russians were kidnapped and sold into slavery in Khiva every year.

== Aftermath ==
The border clashes between the Russian Tsardom and the Kazakh Khanate led to a crisis in the colonization of Southern Trans-Uralia. The settlement of new lands was halted and even reversed. Peasants were relocated from the right bank of the Tobol River. Villagers from settlements threatened by raids were resettled in large fortified outposts. Many small villages were abandoned or razed, and peasants abandoned the Verkh-Suyerskaya settlement. Only the well-fortified Yemurtlinskaya settlement, which housed a dragoon detachment, remained on the right bank. The construction of new settlements on “disputed lands” was henceforth prohibited.

Kazakh raids also caused food shortages in the Tobolsk region. Thousands of captives from Siberia were sold into slavery in the cities of Central Asia. These campaigns brought significant profits to their organizers, the noble subjects of Tauke Khan. Raids continued despite exchanges of embassies and friendly letters from the Khan to Moscow. The intensity of conflicts decreased only during wars with the Dzungar Khanate. Strengthening the military forces of the Russian Tsardom in the Tobolsk region improved peasant security but did not completely stop the raids.

The Russo-Kazakh conflict also led to a sharp deterioration in Russo-Bashkir relations. According to various sources, Bashkirs joined Kazakh detachments. In 1704, a Bashkir uprising began, supported by the forces and government of the Kazakh Khanate.

== See also ==
- Bashkir rebellion of 1704–1711
- Kazakh-Dzungar Wars
- Khivan slave trade
- Bukhara slave trade
- Barbary slave trade
- Crimean–Nogai slave raids in Eastern Europe

== Sources ==
- Basin, V. Ya. (1971). Россия и Казахские ханства в XVI-XVIII вв. : Казахстан в системе внешней политики Российской империи [Russia and the Kazakh Khanates in the 16th-18th centuries: Kazakhstan in the system of foreign policy of the Russian Empire] (in Russian). Almaty: Nauka.
- Isina, A.I., ed. (2005). История Казахстана в русских источниках XVI—XX веков [History of Kazakhstan in Russian sources of the 16th-20th centuries] (in Russian). Vol. I. Embassy materials of the Russian state (15th-17th centuries). Almaty: Dyke Press. ISBN 9965-699-79-8.
- Maslyuzhenko, D. N. (2015). D.N. Maslyuzhenko; V.V. Menshchikova (eds.). Слобода Царево Городище на Тоболе (1679—1782 гг.) : монография [Settlement Tsarevo Gorodishche on the Tobol (1679-1782): monograph] (in Russian). Kurgan: Ministry of Education and Science of the Russian Federation, Kurgan State University. ISBN 978-5-4217-0318-1.
- Temirgaliev, R. (2019). Kazakhs and Russia. Aspandau. ISBN 978-601-7283-98-8.
- Полное собрание русских летописей [Complete collection of Russian chronicles] (in Russian). Vol. 36: Siberian Chronicles, Part 1: The Esipovskaya Chronicle Group. Мoscow: Nauka. 1987.
- Terentyev, Michail (2022) [1906]. История завоевания Средней Азии [The history of the conquest of Central Asia] (in Russian). Vol. 1. Moscow: АИРО-XXI. ISBN 978-5-4481-1327-7.
- Erofeeva, I. (2007). Хан Абулхаир: Полководец и политик [Khan Abulkhair: Military leader and politician] (in Russian) (3 ed.). Almaty: Дайк-Пресс. ISBN 978-9965-798-64-1.
