= Ğazı III Giray =

Khan of the Crimean Khanate (lived 1674–1708, reigned 1704–1707)

Gazi III Giray (Note: Crimean Tatar, Ottoman Turkish and Persian: غازی کرای ثالث) (lived 1674–1708, reigned 1704–1707) was a khan of the Crimean Khanate. He was the second son of Selim I Giray. His brothers were khans Saadet IV Giray, Mengli II Giray, Devlet II Giray, Qaplan I Giray and Selyamet II Giray. None of his sons were khans. He succeeded his father Selim and was followed by his brother Qaplan.

During his father's third reign (1692–1699) he was serasker of the Budjak Horde. In 1699 his father resigned and was replaced by Gazi's older brother Devlet II Giray. Gazi was made nureddin. He and the Budjaks rose against his brother and after their defeat he was exiled to Rhodes. Devlet was deposed in 1702 and Gazi's father became khan for the fourth time. Gazi was made his kalga.

In December 1704 his father died and Gazi became khan. He appointed as kalga and nureddin his brothers Qaplan and Mengli.

Russia and Turkey were then at peace, but the Nogais continued raiding. Russia complained to Istanbul that Gazi did not stop them. Gazi also opposed Ottoman attempts to transfer the Budjak Nogais from Crimea to Turkey. His brother Qaplan plotted against him and there were court factions in Istanbul.

He was deposed in 1707 and died of plague at Karnobat near Constantinople in July 1708. He was described as tall, black-bearded and handsome.

== Sources and notes ==
- İnalcık, Halil (1996). "GAZİ GİRAY III". TDV Encyclopedia of Islam, Vol. 13 (Fikih – Gelenek) (in Turkish). Istanbul: Turkiye Diyanet Foundation, Centre for Islamic Studies. p. 453. ISBN 978-975-389-440-1.
- Henry Hoyle Howorth, History of the Mongols, 1880, Part 2, page 565 (one paragraph)

Preceded by Selim I Giray	Khan of Crimea; 1704–1707	Succeeded by Qaplan I Giray
