= Kuban Nogai uprising =

1783 uprising

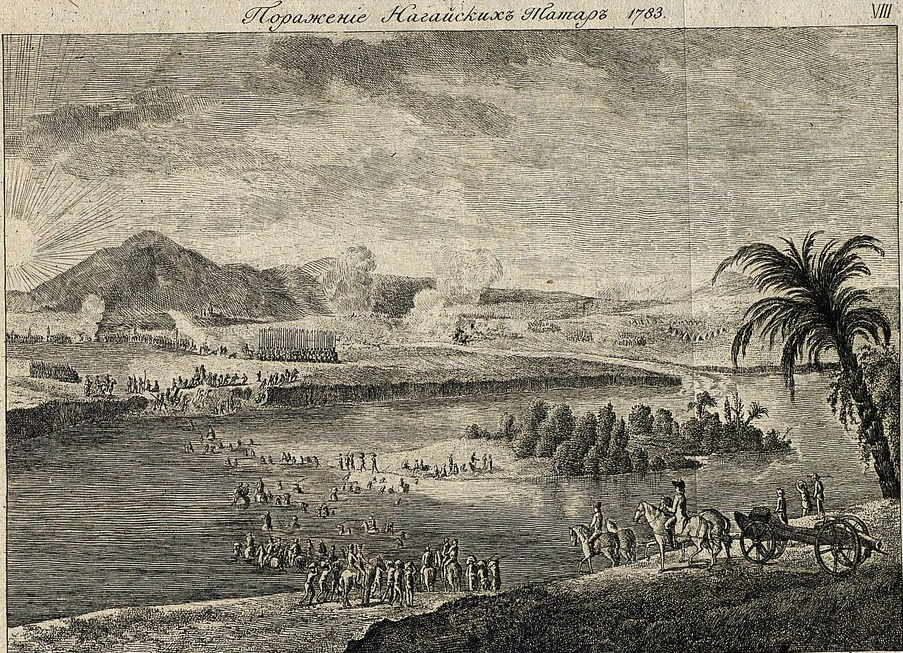
- Debacle of the Nogai Tatars
Date	1783
Location	Kuban
Result	Russian victory
Territorial changes	Political independence of the Nogai Horde ceased

Belligerents
Russian Empire	Nogai Horde

Commanders and leaders
Alexander Suvorov	Kanakay Morza

Units involved
Kuban Corps	

Strength
12 battalions, 20 squadrons, 16 cannons, 20 Don Cossack regiments	Russian estimate: ~10,000 or more

Casualties and losses
Uray-Ilgasa: 48 killed, 24 wounded Kermenchik & Sarychiger (Laba): 4 killed, 7 wounded, 11 missing	Yeysk Fortress: up to 400 killed, 200+ captured Kermenchik & Sarychiger: up to 3,500 killed, 1,000 captured

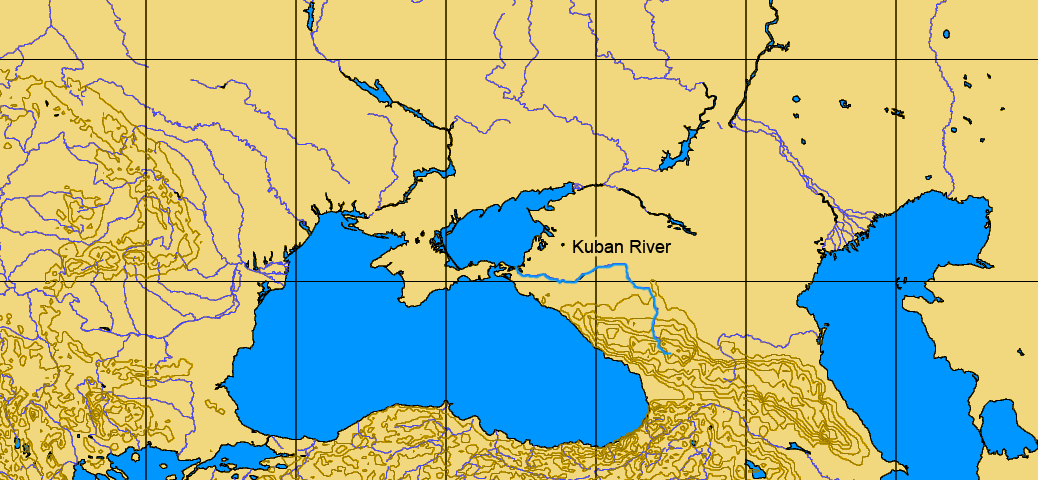
Kuban steppe east of the Sea of Azov and north of the Caucasus

The Kuban Nogai uprising (Suvorov's Transkuban campaign) of 1783 saw the last significant attempt of the Nogai steppe nomads to resist the expansion of Russia. Its defeat opened the way for Slavic colonization of the lands north of the Caucasus and was an early step in the Russian conquest of the Caucasus. It resulted from the annexation of Crimea by the Russian Empire and tsarist plans to resettle the Nogais to the Urals. It was brutally suppressed in a few months by the troops under the command of Alexander Suvorov.

== Background ==
For almost 300 years the Nogais north of the Black Sea had been theoretically subject to the Crimean Khanate which in turn was a vassal of the Ottoman Turks. The Kuban Nogais, being far to the east, tended to be more independent than the nearer groups. Russia slowly expanded southward pushing the Nogais south. As a result of the Russo-Turkish War of 1768–1774, the Crimean Khanate became independent of the Ottomans, but in fact became a Russian protectorate (1774 to 1783). The Russian-imposed Şahin Giray proved unpopular and had to be propped up by the Russians. The Kuban Nogais remained hostile to the Russian government. In 1781 Nogais began agitating on the Kuban, which was interpreted as hostile to the pro-Russian Crimean Khan. By July 1782, the uprising had spread to Crimea. This first uprising was suppressed by the Russian troops at the end of 1782.

== Insurrection ==
: Kuban River

On April 8, 1783, the Russian empress Catherine II issued a manifesto, according to which Crimea, Taman and the Kuban were declared Russian possessions. This was interpreted as transferring the Nogais from Crimea to Russia. A significant part of the Black Sea Nogais (Yedisan, Edishkul, Dzhemboyluk) chose to migrate across the Kuban River, not wishing to be Russian subjects.

In the early summer of 1783 Alexander Suvorov, the head of the Kuban Corps, attempted by persuasion and orders to persuade the Kuban Nogai to swear allegiance to the Russian Empire. At the same time, by order of Grigory Potemkin, preparations were made for the resettlement of the Nogais to the Urals, as well as to the Tambov Governorate and Saratov Governorate (west of the southern Urals). On June 28, 1783, the Kuban and Black Sea Nogai Mirzas took the oath of loyalty to Russia near Yeysk at the mouth of the Yeya River. The resettlement began under the escort of Russian and Cossack troops, who blocked all the fords and crossings of the Yeya River.

In response to this, on July 30–31, 1783, an uprising of the majority of the Nogais, who refused to move, began in the Kuban. At dawn on August 1, the rebels (7–10 thousand men) attacked the post at the confluence of the Orak Yylgasa (Uray-Ilgasa) and Yeya rivers, (Note: location?) where part of the Butyrsky and Vladimir regiments were located, commanded by Lieutenant Zhidkov. A fierce battle ensued. Squadrons of First Majors (?премьер-майоров) Kekuatov and Rautsius came to the aid of the Butyrskys. The battle, extending to a radius of 30 kilometers, ended in a heavy defeat of the Nogais. Some of the Nogais, nevertheless, broke through and went south to the area of the Laba River, a north-flowing tributary of the Kuban. Government troops managed to capture Mambet-Mirza Murzabekov, Kelembet-Mirza and several other Mirzas.

On the night of August 23, taking out the Cossack pickets around Yeysk and cutting communications, a 5,000-man squad of Nogai horsemen launched an assault on Yeysk town. Two assaults were repulsed by the Yeysk garrison. Learning that from the Azov Sea (sic) a large group of Nogai horsemen was moving to the aid of assailants, I. M. Leshkevich withdrew his units from the fortress and dispersed the attackers with cannon. Among the leaders who attacked Yeisk were 40 mirzas and agas, mostly young Nogai aristocrats. It was not possible to take Yeysk because the Russian guns were a serious obstacle to the lightly armed nomad cavalry. The Nogais suffered heavy losses.

On the night of October 1, 1783, parts of the Kuban Corps and Don Cossacks under the command of Suvorov secretly crossed the Kuban river and fell on the main camp of the rebels near Kermenchik on the River Laba, 12 kilometers from its confluence with the Kuban. In this decisive battle Suvorov completely defeated the Nogai troops. Mirzas of the Edishkul, Kasaev and Navruz hordes were killed in the battle.

At the end of the year Suvorov sent expeditions across the Kuban against individual groups of Nogais.

== Results ==
For the Nogais, up to 7,000 Nogai warriors fell in these battles and no more than 1,000 were captured, not counting women and children. As a result, the majority of mirzas offered obedience to Suvorov and finally recognized the accession of the Crimea and the Nogai lands to the Russian Empire. In turn, the Russian authorities abandoned their original plans to resettle the Nogais to the Urals. Some of the Kuban Nogais moved to the Caspian coast, where many modern Nogais live to this day. The Dzhemboyluk and Yedisan hordes moved to the Molochna River region northwest of the Sea of Azov.

The Nogai suffered significant losses, which affected the whole people. The political independence of the nomadic Nogai hordes was finally lost. By many modern Nogai social organizations, the suppression of the uprising is perceived as an act of genocide. According to figures provided by some Nogai organizations, several tens of thousands of people, including women and children, were killed during the suppression of the uprising.

For the Russian Empire the way was now open for the colonization of the steppes of north of the Caucasus.

== See also ==
- Annexation of Crimea by the Russian Empire
