= Garigliano (disambiguation) =

Garigliano may refer to:

- Garigliano, a river in central Italy
- Garigliano, a name used on the west coast of Italy for Tramontane, a cold wind from the north or northeast
- Battle of Garigliano : could refer to
  - Battle of Garigliano (457), a 457 battle
  - Battle of Garigliano, a 915 battle
  - Battle of Garigliano (1503), a 1503 battle
  - Battle of Garigliano (1860), a 1860 battle
