= Crimean campaigns (1687–1689) =

Campaigns in the Russo-Turkish War (1686–1700)

- Part of the Russo-Turkish War (1686–1700)
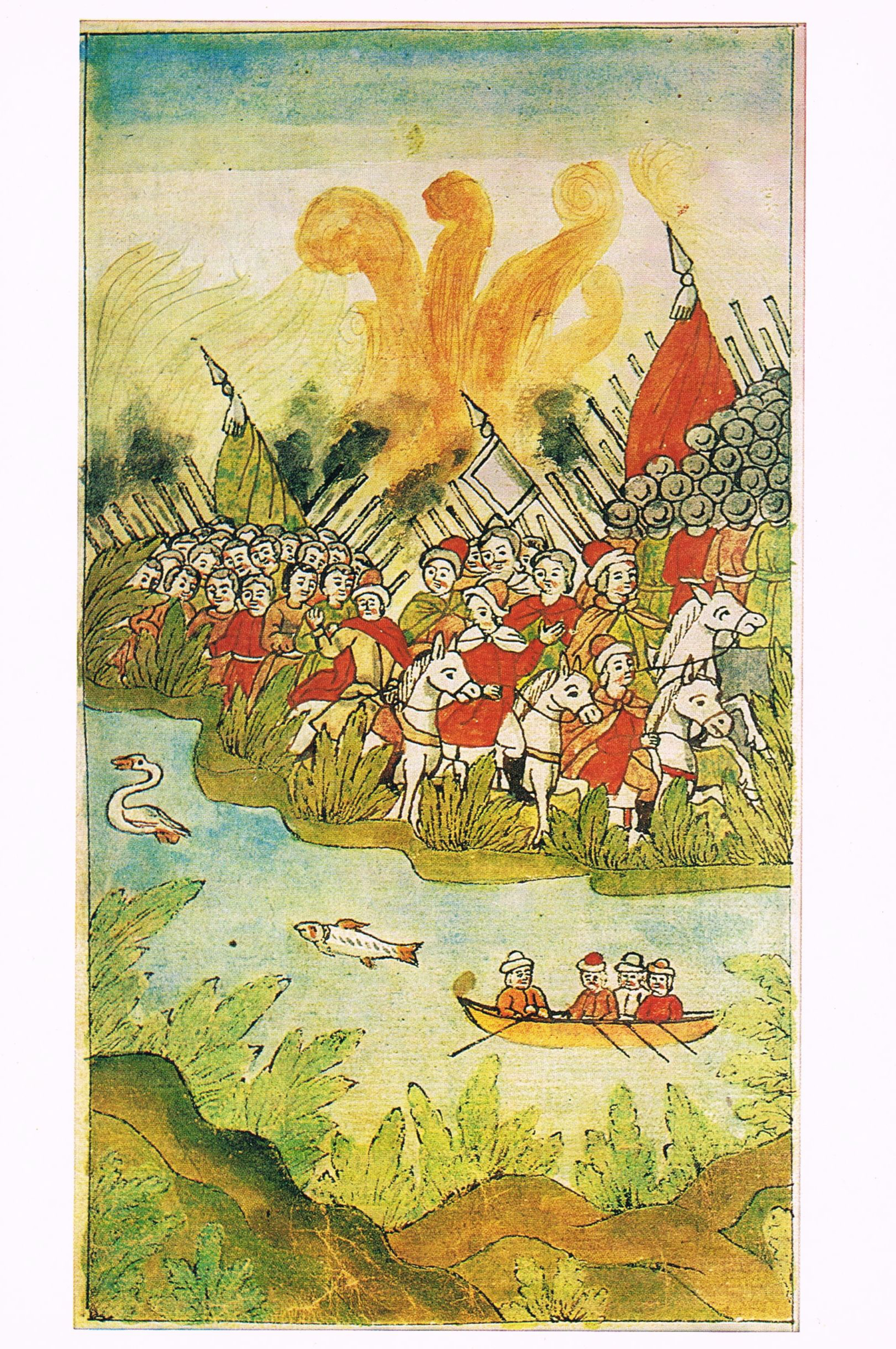
- An artist's impression of Russian troops returning from their failed Crimean campaign.
Date	1687 and 1689
Location	Chyhyryn, Tsardom of Russia
Result	Ottoman–Tatar victory
Territorial changes	Crimean Khanate retained independence; Ottoman expansion in Europe halted

Belligerents
Ottoman Empire: Crimean Khanate	Tsardom of Russia: Cossack Hetmanate

Commanders and leaders
Selim I Giray; Suleiman II	1st campaign: Vasily Golitsyn; Ivan Samoilovich 2nd campaign: Vasily Golitsyn; V. D. Dolgorukov (Dolgoruky); M. G. Romodanovsky; Ivan Mazepa

Strength
30,000–40,000	1687: 91,038 men 1689: 117,532 men

Casualties and losses
Unknown	1687: 20,000 – 30,000 dead, wounded, missing or sick 1689: 222 killed, 1,028 wounded, 73 missing, 35,000 died during the retreat

The Crimean campaigns (1687–1689) (Russian: Крымские походы, Krymskiye pokhody) were two military campaigns of the Tsardom of Russia against the Crimean Khanate. They were a part of the Russo-Turkish War (1686–1700) and Russo-Crimean Wars. These were the first Russian forces to come close to Crimea since 1569. They failed due to poor planning and the practical problem of moving such a large force across the steppe but nonetheless played a key role in halting the Ottoman expansion in Europe. The campaigns came as a surprise for the Ottoman leadership, spoiled its plans to invade Poland and Hungary and forced it to move significant forces from Europe to the east, which greatly helped the League in its struggle against the Ottomans.

Having signed the Eternal Peace Treaty with Poland in 1686, Russia became a member of the anti-Turkish coalition ("Holy League" — Austria, the Republic of Venice and Poland), which was pushing the Turks south after their failure at Vienna in 1683 (the major result of this war was the conquest by Austria of most of Hungary from Turkish rule). Russia's role in 1687 was to send a force south to Perekop to bottle up the Crimeans inside their peninsula.

== First campaign ==
On 18 May 1687, a Russian army of about 90,610 soldiers, led by knyaz Vasily Golitsyn, left Okhtyrka on the Belgorod Line. On 2 June they were joined by 50,000 Left Bank Cossacks under hetman Ivan Samoilovich at the mouth of the Samora River where the Dnieper turns south. In the heat of summer, 140,000 men, 20,000 wagons and 100,000 horses set out down the east bank of the Dnieper. The huge force, which started too late and was perhaps poorly organized, could only travel about 10 km per day. When the Russians reached the Konskiye Vody river on the west-flowing part of the Dnieper, they found that the Tatars has set fire to the steppe (they had planned to use steppe grass to feed their horses). After a few days of marching over burnt land, their horses were exhausted, they were short of water, and 130 miles from their goal at Perekop. However, Golitsyn built the Novobohorodytska Fortress at the junction of the Dnieper and the Samara. On 17 June they decided to turn back. (Ivan Samoilovich was made a scapegoat and replaced by Ivan Mazepa.)

== Second campaign ==
In February 1689, 112,000 Russian troops and 350 guns set out. On 20 April they were joined at Novobogoroditskoye by 30–40,000 Cossacks under Mazepa. They followed the 1687 route, but marched in six separate columns and made much better time. By 3 May they were at the point where the 1687 expedition had turned back. On 15 and 16 May they were attacked by Crimean Tatars near Zelenaya Dolina and Chernaya Dolina. The Crimeans did fairly well but were driven back by the Russian's tabor defense and artillery. On 20 May they reached the isthmus of Perekop. Golitsyn was dismayed to find that all the grass in the area had been trampled down and that there was no source of drinking water north of the peninsula, thereby making a long siege or blockade impossible. Further on, the Tatars had dug a 7 km ditch which made moving the artillery forward impossible. The next day, Golitsyn ordered his army to turn back.

The Crimean campaigns of 1687 and 1689 diverted some of the Ottoman and Crimean forces in favour of Russia's allies. They also led to the end of the alliance between the Crimean Khanate, France and Imre Thököly signed in 1683. However, the Russian army didn't reach the goal of stabilizing Russia's southern borders. The unsuccessful outcome of these campaigns was one of the reasons the government of Sophia Alekseyevna collapsed.
