= Selim I Giray =

Khan of Crimea sporadically from 1671 to 1704

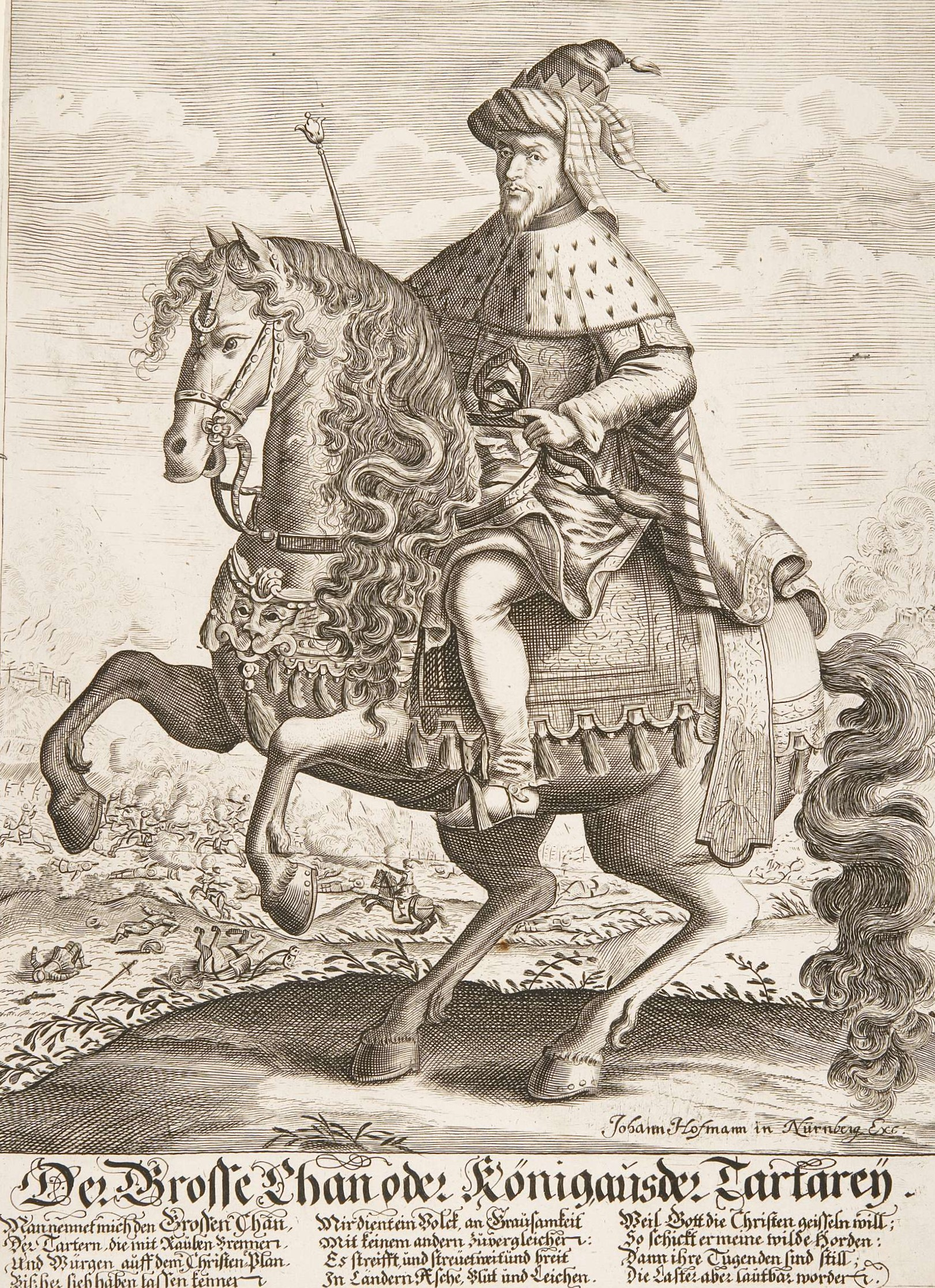

Khan of Crimea
- 1st reign: 1671–1678
- Predecessor: Adil Giray
- Successor: Murad Giray
- 2nd reign: 1684–1691
- Predecessor: Haci II Giray
- Successor: Saadet III Giray
- 3rd reign: 1692–1699
- Predecessor: Safa Giray of Crimea
- Successor: Devlet II Giray
- 4th reign: 1702–1704
- Predecessor: Devlet II Giray
- Successor: Ğazı III Giray
- Born: 1631
- Died: 22 December 1704 (aged 72–73)
- Dynasty: Giray dynasty
- Religion: Islam

Selim I Giray (Note: Crimean Tatar, Ottoman Turkish and Persian: سلیم کرای) (1631 – 22 December 1704) was four times Khan of the Crimean Khanate in the period from 1671 to 1704. During this time Crimean khans were regularly appointed and replaced by the Ottomans. The main events of the period were the continuing conflicts in Ukraine, the Russian capture of Azov and the Great Turkish War during which the Turks were pushed back from Vienna in 1683 to about the line of Belgrade. Unlike other khans of the period, he ruled well and had no conflicts with his nobles.

== Background ==
Crimean khans were the direct descendants of Genghis Khan, the Mongol Emperor. After the death of Genghis Khan (1227) the empire was partitioned and the part in East Europe and Northwest Asia was named Golden Horde. The Golden Horde khans embraced Islam. That region which was also called Desht-i Qipchaq was the home of Kypchak Turks and the khanate was Turkified. In the early 15th century Golden Horde was further partitioned. One of the parts was the Crimean Khanate founded in and around the Crimean Peninsula, modern Ukraine in 1441. Giray was the name of the dynasty of khans. However, after partitioning, the parts of the khanate were no longer the major powers in the East Europe and in 1478 after an Ottoman campaign to Cremea, the Crimean Khanate had to accept the suzerainty of the Ottoman Empire. Being the main Muslim vassal of the empire, Crimean Khanate had a privileged status in the Ottoman Empire.

== Family ==
Selim's father Bahadır I Giray (1637) was one of the many sons of Selâmet I Giray (1608). Selamet was the ancestor of most subsequent khans. He had 10 daughters and either 10 or 13 sons, five of whom were khans. Among his sons were Devlet II Giray (1699, 1709), Gazi III Giray (1704), Qaplan I Giray (1707, 1713, 1730), Saadet IV Giray (1717), Meñli II Giray (1724, 1737) and Selâmet II Giray (1740) and Azamet, Adil, Muhamed, Shabaz, Maksud, Sahib and Safa. Most subsequent khans were descended from Devlet II, except for the sons of Saadet and Selyamet and the son and grandson of Qaplan.

== First reign (1671-1678) ==
He was appointed as the khan in 1671 while he was in retirement at 'Cholmek' near Yambol in modern in Bulgaria. It is said that he obtained the khanship by bribing vizier Kologi. His kalga and nureddin were his brother Selyamet and his cousin Safa. He was immediately called to fight in the Polish–Ottoman War (1672–76). Howorth says that he and his two sons contributed to the capture of Kamianets-Podilskyi. He captured many prisoners in Pokutia and Volhynia but was forced to abandon them by Jan Sobieski. When the Nogais near Akkerman revolted against the Porte Selim forced them to move to Crimea, but they drifted back.

In 1676 the pro-Turkish Doroshenko was defeated at Chyhyryn by the Russians and forced to abdicate. In 1677 Turkish and Crimean troops were sent to re-take Chyryhin. The Russians barely won the siege, Selim received part of the blame and was removed. See Russo-Turkish War (1676–1681). He spent the winter in Kaffa and retired to Rhodes.

== 1678-1684 ==
He was followed by Murad Giray and then Haci II Giray. In 1683 Murad was removed for his part in the Ottoman defeat at Vienna. Haci was soon driven out by the Crimean nobles.

== Second reign (1684-1691) ==
The Turkish disaster at Vienna led to the so-called Great Turkish War (1683–1699) in which all the neighboring powers ganged up to push the Turks south. Russia's role was to send two expeditions against Crimea (Crimean campaigns of 1687 and 1689). Both failed due to supply problems, but they kept Crimean troops away from the main fighting in the west. In 1688 Selim defeated some Austrians. In 1689 he was again successful near Belgrade, but his son was killed. He chose to resign the khanship and make the pilgrimage to Mecca. On his return he settled at an estate called ‘Kazikui near Silivri’.

== 1691-1692 ==
He was followed by Saadet III Giray who was removed after less than a year. The next khan, Safa Giray of Crimea, was replaced by Selim at Crimean request. Saadet failed the Turks militarily and Safa was accused of drunkenness, among other things,

== Third Reign (1692-1699) ==
His kalga was his son Devlet. His nureddin was Shahin, the son of his nephew Selyamet. His reign was dominated by three problems: fighting in the Balkans, raiding and fighting in Ukraine and the Russian capture of Azov.

In 1692 he was immediately called to fight in the Balkans. In September 1695 he was again called west and took part in the battle of Lippa or Lugos. (see de:Friedrich von Veterani)

During the Azov campaigns (1695–96) Peter the Great tried to capture Azov, the second campaign being successful. Russia held Azov until 1711.

The Crimeans raided Domanchov (1692), Poltava (1692,1693) and Pereiaslav (1694). In return the Cossacks raided Ochakov and Perekop. Following the Azov campaigns the Cossacks built forts near the mouth of the Don and Crimeans raided toward Lemburg (1697). Crimeans fought Poles at the Battle of Podhajce (1698).

It is not clear why Selim chose to leave the throne. He retired to an estate near Silivri. His departure roughly coincided with the Treaty of Karlowitz (1699) which ended the Great Turkish War and the Treaty of Constantinople (1700) which ended Russian involvement in the same war.

== 1699-1702 ==
During this time Selim suffered from gout and moved to various places near Istanbul in hope of a cure. Selim was followed by his son Devlet II Giray. Devlet was removed and replaced by his father (fourth reign) because of conflicts with his brothers and because of his provocative hostility to Russia.

== Fourth reign (1702–1704) ==
The 71-year old Selim appointed his sons Gazi and Qaplan as kalga and nureddin. In 1704 Selim warned the Porte of Russian expansionism, just as his son had done. He died in Bahçesaray, Crimea and was buried in the tomb of the mosque named after him (22 July 1704). He was followed by Ğazı III Giray (1704), Qaplan I Giray (1707) and Devlet II Giray again (1709).

== Personality ==
Although a war hero, Selim is also known for his talent as a poet and a musician. As a poet, he wrote the zafername (book of victories) about his victories against Russians at Perekop. During his frequent stays in İstanbul, he supported musicians like Hafız Post (1630–1694).

== His sons ==
Selim was the son of Bahadır I Giray and grandson of Selyamet I, another khan who was the father of many khans. From 1704 to 1743 the khanship was held by six of Selim's sons, with one exception. After 1743 all khans were descended from Selim's sons Saadet IV (1), Qaplan I (2), Selyamet II (1) and Devlet II (majority).

Selim's six ‘royal’ sons were Devlet II Giray, Ğazı III Giray, Qaplan I Giray, Saadet IV Giray, Meñli II Giray and Selâmet II Giray. His non-royal sons were Azamat, Adil, Mukhammed, Shahbaz Giray, Maksud, Sahib and Safa.

=== The Era of Selim's six sons (1699–1743) ===
In this period Istanbul regularly imposed and replaced Crimean rulers. According to one author the Crimean begs were on the Turkish payroll. In 1699 Selim resigned and went on the Hajj. His eldest son Devlet II (first reign) became khan. In 1702 the Selim (fourth reign) was restored. In 1704 Gazi III became khan on his father's death. In 1707 Qaplan (first reign) was enthroned by the Turks. In 1709 Devlet II (second reign) was restored after Qaplan was defeated by the Circassians. In 1713 Qaplan (second reign) was restored because Devlet mishanded the Swedish king after the battle of Poltava. In 1716 Devlet III was enthroned. In 1717 Saadet IV was enthroned. In 1724 Mengli II followed and fought the Nogais. In 1730 Qaplan (third reign) was restored. Russia invaded Crimea, Qaplan was blamed and deposed. In 1736 Feti II Giray was enthroned. He was not one of the six brothers but the son of one of the brothers, Devlet II. He was deposed after 10 months because of a Russian victory. In 1737 Mengli was restored. He fought the Russians and died after two years. In 1739 Selyamet II was enthroned on Mengli's death. In 1743 Selyamet was deposed, thus ending the era of the six brothers.

== Notes ==
Preceded by Adil Giray	Khan of Crimea; 1671–1678	Succeeded by Murad Giray
Preceded by Hacı II Giray	Khan of Crimea; 1684–1691	Succeeded by Saadet III Giray
Preceded by Sefa Giray	Khan of Crimea; 1692–1699	Succeeded by Devlet II Giray
Preceded by Devlet II Giray	Khan of Crimea; 1702–1704	Succeeded by Gazi III Giray
