= Hrizea of Bogdănei =

Wallachian boyar and rebel leader

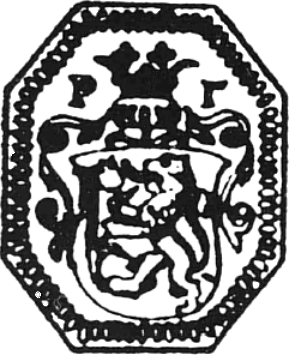
- Seal used by Hrizea's grandfather, Hrizea of Bălteni

Unrecognized Prince of Wallachia
- In office May – June 1655
- In office March – April 1657

Personal details
- Born: unknown date Ialomița County?
- Died: April or September 1657 Târgoviște
- Spouse: Stana of Deleni
- Relations: Matei Basarab (in-law); Udriște Năsturel (cousin); Elena Năsturel (cousin); Hrizea of Bălteni (grandfather)
- Children: Barbu of Bogdănei; Stoica of Bogdănei; Matei of Bogdănei; Ilina Rudeanca
- Nickname(s): Hrizică, Hrizea-Vodă

Military service
- Allegiance: Wallachia
- Years of service: April–December 1654; May–June 1655
- Rank: Spatharios
- Commands: Wallachian military forces Seimeni

Hrizea of Bogdănei (Romanian: Hrizea din Bogdănei), also rendered as Hrizică, sometimes Hrizea-Vodă ("Hrizea the Voivode"; ? – April to September 1657), was a Wallachian boyar and rebel leader, who proclaimed himself reigning prince in 1655. After rising to high office under his relative, Prince Matei Basarab, he was reconfirmed by Constantin Șerban. He alternated the offices of Spatharios, in charge of the Wallachian military forces, and Paharnic, before being won over by the rebellious Seimeni mercenaries. He issued a claim to the throne in Târgoviște, but controlled only part of the country, and had his seat at Gherghița. In summer 1655, his army was defeated, at Șoplea, by Wallachian loyalist troops, supported by Transylvanians and Moldavians.

Hrizea took refuge in the Ottoman Empire, where he surrendered, and then was retained with his family as hostage by Transylvanian Prince George II Rákóczi. He escaped his captivity at Feyérvár during the confusion that followed Rákóczi's participation in the Swedish Deluge. Trying to stage his return to Wallachia with a new Seimeni force, he was reportedly kidnapped south of Hermannstadt, and delivered to Wallachia as a prisoner. His supporters were met by Preda Brâncoveanu in Gorj County in September 1657, and were defeated there, possibly following a ruse or a betrayal.

The survivors were mutilated or executed in various ways. Hrizea and his retinue were also killed—either hanged or broken on the wheel. The Seimeni continued to be involved in intrigues against Prince Constantin, and were eventually pacified by the latter. Some made a brief return to prominence under Mihnea III, part of a warlord alliance gathered around Rákóczi.

== Biography ==
=== Rise ===
Hrizea was alive at the time when Wallachia and Moldavia, the two Danubian Principalities, were vassal states of the Ottoman Empire; he was by origin a member of the boyar nobility. Born at an unknown date, he was the only known son of Vistier Dumitrașco of Bogdănei (died 1636). His mother Alexandra was the daughter of another Hrizea, the boyar of Bălteni, who served as Vornic. The family took its name from a core estate in Ialomița County, though it also owned land in Oltenia, at Verguleasa. Dumitrașco is described by scholar Nicolae Iorga as a "rural boyar", which indicates that he was not one of the major figures in Wallachian politics. However, as noted by historian N. Stoicescu, his known aristocratic origins contradict claims that Hrizea was an upstart, claims which were first publicized by an anonymous chronicle, Letopisețul Cantacuzinesc. Moreover, Hrizea was cousins with the scholar Udriște Năsturel and his sister Elena; the latter was married to Matei Basarab, a Seimeni leader who became the Wallachian Prince in 1632.

Iorga describes the future rebel as a staunch opponent of the regime, one whose servants testified against Prince Matei in front of Ottoman Sultan Murad IV. This in fact refers to his maternal grandfather Hrizea, who spent the early 1630s as a refugee in Moldavia, eventually reconciling with his lord. Himself a loyalist, Hrizea of Bogdănei is first attested as a second-class Postelnic at Prince Matei's court in May 1642, and confirmed as one of the Cluceri in 1643; he possibly served as Clucer until March 1650, when he was assigned a Captaincy in the Wallachian military forces. He was Matei's Great Paharnic from February 23, 1651, to June 11, 1653, possibly inheriting this office from his father-in-law, Drăgușin (or Dragomir) of the Deleni boyars. Drăgușin's daughter, named in records as Stana, was the mother of Hrizea's three sons—Barbu, Stoica and Matei—and daughter, Ilina. On their estate at Verguleasa, the family erected a Wallachian Orthodox church, where he is mistakenly recorded as "Rizea".

A new Prince, Constantin Șerban, selected Hrizea as his general commander, or Spatharios, on April 25, 1654. He served in that position to December 29, returning as Great Paharnic from January 8 to May 11, 1655. He was also an "intimate friend" of the new ruler, whose ascent came with the persecution of Matei Basarab's loyalists. In 1654, the preceding Spatharios, Diicul Buicescul, was mutilated ("they carved his nose") to prevent his candidacy for the throne. Buicescul then ran away from the country, seeking refuge in the Principality of Transylvania. As noted at the time by the chronicler Paul of Aleppo, Wallachia's Spatharios (or Serdar), who may have been either Buicescul or Hrizea, was a central figure at the investiture, receiving the army and people's oath on behalf of the Prince.

=== Rebellion ===
At this stage, Hrizea became involved in the plot against Prince Constantin, which broke out as a rebellion of the Seimeni (or Servitori) mercenaries, which is traced by historians to February 26 or 27 (Old Style: February 16 or 17), 1655. According to various records, Constantin had intended to terminate contracts for mostly Serb troops, already noted for their rebelliousness under Prince Matei. The Seimeni were warned of this by their colleagues in the regular infantry, and proceeded to seek out boyars whom they viewed as responsible for their plight. Other detailed accounts suggest that Constantin wanted infantry officers on his side, promising them an increased pay, upon which the footmen sided with the Seimeni. Historian A. D. Xenopol favors a different account: Constantin tried but failed to arrest all of the Seimeni at once, as only 200 of some 1,000 obeyed his order to show up in Bucharest. The boyars, Xenopol writes, were correctly identified as being hostile to the Seimeni, having openly supported the elimination of an expenditure which went to "savage" and "desperate" troops. Chronicler David Herman reports that the Seimeni were never subject to a mass arrest, although their commander, Simion, was kidnapped by Constantin's guards.

The enraged mercenaries embarked on an "unprecedented bloodletting"; they "entered the boyar homes, chopping them up with their weapons before their wives and young ones, in many places raping their women, pillaging their homes and estates." Various accounts name between 14 and 32 of Wallachia's boyars as murdered in the first incidents of the revolt, though tens more were probably also killed at this stage. Despite its brutality and its desecration of churches, the revolt was endorsed by the Wallachia's Romanian populace, and was especially popular with the boyars' serfs. Allied or opportunistic revolts broke out among the tenants of Arnota Monastery, in Dobriceni and Bărbătești, as well as among the tanners of Bucharest and the burghers of Târgoviște, Buzău, and Ploiești.

Several historians propose that the revolt should be read as more than a "praetorian" uprising. This view was embraced by Ludovic Demény, who agreed with Iorga's description of "deeper causes" for Seimeni massacres. He decries "subjectivist" assessments by Ilie Minea and Sándor Szilágyi, highlighting mass popular support for the mercenaries. Likewise, Matei Cazacu describes the uprising as an "anti-feudal movement" or "social war", "the first one in our history to target the Prince [...], as well as religion". This view is also backed by another author, Constantin Rezachievici, who views the Seimeni rising as "the most important mass movement of all the medieval period, south of the Carpathians." Researcher George Potra also deems the Seimeni war a "great popular uprising [...] against boyar oppression and exploitation".

The uprising was in full swing by April, managing to kill several figures at Constantin's court, including Ban Ghiorma Alexeanu and Clucer Cârstea Cornățeanu, as well as a former Vistier, George Karydis. By several accounts, Prince Constantin was his troops' hostage, pretending to endorse the massacres, but secretly asking for a Transylvanian intervention against the Seimeni. This view is partly contradicted by Xenopol, who notes that Constantin had a running dispute with the Transylvanian Prince, George II Rákóczi. The latter was interested in intervening against the Seimeni because he wanted Buicescul and his son to take over as puppet rulers of Wallachia. Buicescul's name is recorded among those of Wallachian boyars who openly begged for a Transylvanian intervention.

=== Prince-claimant ===
Rákóczi officially declared that he would take measure to contain the revolt and prevent it from spreading into Transylvania or Moldavia; he was also alarmed by news that the Seimeni were trying to forge an alliance with the Cossack Hetmanate, which risked opening a war on two fronts. He convened a Diet at his capital in Feyérvár (Bălgrad), asking for its permission to commence war in Wallachia. This began on April 13, with a southward march from Segesvár (Sighișoara) to Corona (Brașov), where Rákóczi gathered some 30,000 soldiers and 12 cannons. Faced with this emergency, the Seimeni took an oath from Constantin, who promised again to act as their sovereign. Led at the time by a Muslim, they welcomed Ottoman envoys, assuring them that theirs was not a revolt against the Empire. As Cazacu notes, the Ottoman overseers, in particular Siyavuş Pasha, wanted to join in the war on the Seimeni, but the main Ottoman army was still fearful of a war in the East. Other authors suggest that the reason for such inaction was the Cretan War.

As noted by Rezachevici, Constantin had been able to send out some of the Seimeni leaders as delegates to Transylvania, whereupon Rákóczi had captured them; he replaced the missing commanders with boyars from his own retinue. He then persuaded his captors to let him meet with Rákóczi at Gherghița, but while on his way there changed course eastward and headed for the Ottoman province of Silistra, surrendering to Siyavuş Pasha. The boyars began courting Preda Brâncoveanu, proposing that he replace Constantin on the throne. Brâncoveanu remained a loyalist, with his own son Papa having been killed in the events. Before or after this moment, the mercenaries ransacked Dintr-un Lemn Monastery, which was under Preda's patronage.

While dug in at Gherghița, the rebels eventually elected Hrizea as the new Prince. According to Iorga, he can be described as the Seimeni Prince, or as a "warlord". With such endorsement, Hrizea then issued a set of writs which ordered "the country to gather up around him, at Teleajin." Nevertheless, Constantin was able to consolidate a web of alliances against Hrizea. Support also came to him from Moldavia, which, in 1655, was Rákóczi's "satellite"; the Moldavian Prince, Gheorghe Ștefan, who had managed to purge and discipline his own Seimeni, personally joined in the fighting. The Moldavian host he brought with him to Wallachia in summer 1655 included a young Miron Costin, the future chronicler. Costin reports that Prince Gheorghe marched on Wallachia from Focșani, intercepting and capturing one of Hrizea's envoys while crossing Buzău County.

Map of Hrizea's revolts

On June 26, the Seimeni were defeated at Șoplea, where they met a Wallachian army commanded by a new Spatharios, Pană Filipescu, who joined with the Transylvanians. As reported by Costin, the Seimeni narrowly missed out on an opportunity to intercept Rákóczi and his "Hungarian" corps, allowing their enemies to unite. When they eventually decided to attack and tried to split the Transylvanians from the rest, they did so in an undisciplined manner, "like a swarm that's lacking a queen bee". Initially, with some 30 cannons, the rebels had superior firepower, but the guns were unusable in the charge. They had been tied to the backs of water buffaloes, who, under the summer sun, went astray into the Prahova River; this left Hrizea exposed to a cavalry counterattack. According to Iorga, "the mercenaries, softened by the good life, inebriated for the very purpose of doing battle", were massacred by the Transylvanian riders of Captain Gaudy. Nonetheless, Xenopol writes, Hrizea himself behaved "with such bravery as would have befitted a better cause".

=== Hostage ===
The "breaking of the Seimeni" was followed by a second battle outside Ploiești, with some 5,000 Moldavians joining in to destroy Hrizea's scattered forces. Various chronicles also repeat the story according to which Constantin's victory hinged on betrayal or incompetent maneuvers by Hrizea's Aga Lupu Buliga, who fired his cannons "not into the soldiers, but above them." According to Rezachevici, Buliga was one of Prince Constantin's boyar loyalists, who acted out on his earlier orders. Such reports suggest that Hrizea took time away from battle to see Buliga lynched by the Seimeni, or that he himself slashed the Aga with a sabre. According to Stoicescu, the stories are largely discredited, with inscriptions showing that Buliga had actually died in the 1653 battle of Finta. However, other readings of the same writings credit the Hrizea account, suggesting that Buliga had only been severely wounded at Finta, and killed at Șoplea.

Many of the Seimeni fraternized with the enemy, leaving the pretender to collect his remaining troops, and, though continuously harassed by Transylvanian pursuers, to seek his way toward Brăila, in Ottoman territory. This allowed Constantin to leave Silistra and seek to join the Transylvanian–Moldavian troops, which he did at Dridov; on his way there, he intercepted and executed several Seimeni, marking the beginning of a major purge. As Filipescu writes: "the Seimeni discarded their blue clothes and dressed up in messy rags, and swore that they were not soldiers, for whoever was known to be one had no more days left to live." Nevertheless, resistance continued: more skirmishes were recorded outside Bucharest, Brăila, and Craiova. All roads were reportedly unsafe, with Seimeni taking over as "brigands".

Repressive measures were overseen by a Transylvanian stay-behind force, which may have numbered as many as 3,000 men. These were continuously harassed by the rebels and armed civilians, many of whom had taken refuge in the Danube marshlands. Two months after the Ploiești clashes, 2,000 cavalry regulars, or Călărași, also revolted, facing the loyalists outside Călugăreni. Xenopol describes this later revolt as another plot by the Seimeni, centered on "butchering the Hungarians, and on toppling the Prince who had so gravely betrayed them." They won a tactical victory against the Transylvanian regiment of János Boros (Borăș), before being put down by the Moldavians; survivors again withdrew into the marshlands, were, as Boros complained, they could not be reached. Also on the loyalist side, the civil war involved a group of Crimean Tatars under Rüstem Mirza, who entered Wallachia in late June and raided Orașul de Floci. Although as many as 200 inhabitants were massacred, the town's defending army, comprising both burghers and Romani slave-miners, was able to kill Rüstem.

Hrizea and his family found safety in Brăila, but the authorities there eventually surrendered them to Constantin. All family members were taken then as hostages to Feyérvár. The journey involved a stopover in the princely capital of Târgoviște, where, as Boros noted, crowds flocked to show their appreciation for Hrizea and mourn his departure. As an extraordinary precaution against further troubles, a Transylvanian army, probably led by Ákos Barcsay, guarded Hriza's passage through the Jiu Valley.

The exile into Transylvania was arranged by Rákóczi, who set Hrizea's ransom at 100,000 ducats. Hrizea could not pay that sum, and was therefore moved from a townhouse he was renting to a cell in the city garrison. Xenopol suggests that Hrizea was in fact sheltered, and even allowed to command his own army of 500 Seimeni, which Rákóczi used as leverage in his dealings with Constantin. As noted by the same author, the intervention of 1655 had made Constantin entirely dependent on the Transylvanian Prince, who was now his "protector and, so to say, his second-hand suzerain". Eventually, the nucleus of Seimeni in Wallachia submitted to Constantin and Rákóczi. Xenopol summarizes their "strange reconciliation", with the mercenaries expressing regret and referring to Constantin as a "good and gentle Prince".

=== Escape and execution ===
The Wallachian truce was again endangered after less than two years. In December 1656, Captain Priboi, probably as a Hrizea partisan, tried to assassinate Constantin, before being stopped by the Transylvanian bodyguards. In early 1657, Rákóczi intervened in the Swedish Deluge, which caused him to be absent from the capital and sparked a succession crisis at home. During this interval, as many as 500 Seimeni exiles, whom Rákóczi had left in charge of the city defenses, helped their leader break out of prison. They managed to do so on March 23, 1657, while Hrizea was praying in church. Hrizea, with his family and his retinue, rode to Hermannstadt. He could not enter that city, being harassed by local Transylvanian Saxons and Romanians, but eventually crossed the Olt River.

The sources compiled by Iorga suggest that Hrizea never managed to rekindle the revolt with his presence, being betrayed by a Transylvanian Romanian notable in whose house he was lodging, and then delivered to Wallachia as a prisoner. Meanwhile, some 400 Seimeni had grouped in northern Oltenia, possibly at Bistrița Monastery, where they expected his return. However, in Rezachevici's reading, Hrizea crossed the mountains with the help of local Romanians, then barricaded with his troops at Bistrița, expecting reinforcements. His cause had remained popular with both the mercenaries and the Wallachian commoners, but Constantin's regime was able to act before a rebel force could fully take hold. A Wallachian army, led by Brâncoveanu, met the Seimeni in Gorj County, at Târgul Bengăi or Bengești-Ciocadia. As noted by Iorga, they were asked to surrender but refused, and were then decimated. Other reports suggest that they were "not defeated", but promised safe haven, and disarmed under this false pretense.

Hrizea was eventually killed at the princely court in Târgoviște. Iorga and Rezachevici calculate his date of death as April 8 or 9. This is contradicted by other sources, which have September 8. Texts also diverge on the exact method employed, as well as on other circumstances. Stoicescu suggests that Hrizea was broken on the wheel—but also mentions reports according to which he was simply hanged. According to Filipescu, the actual method involved hanging Hrizea and his twelve captains "by a wheel"; "as for the others", Filipescu notes, "they cut off their noses and ears, and [then] set them free." Iorga also records the death as a hanging "amid blood-stained pikes adorned with his soldiers' severed heads." Some sources suggest that the other bodies on the wheel were not those of Seimeni, but included Hrizea's wife and mistresses. Costin reports that the real repression of the Seimeni only began at that stage, and was merely based on word of mouth, allowed for false identifications and a settling of scores. The deserters and suspects were usually impaled: "The field outside Bucharest, and those outside various other towns, were riddled with their pierced bodies."

== Aftermath ==
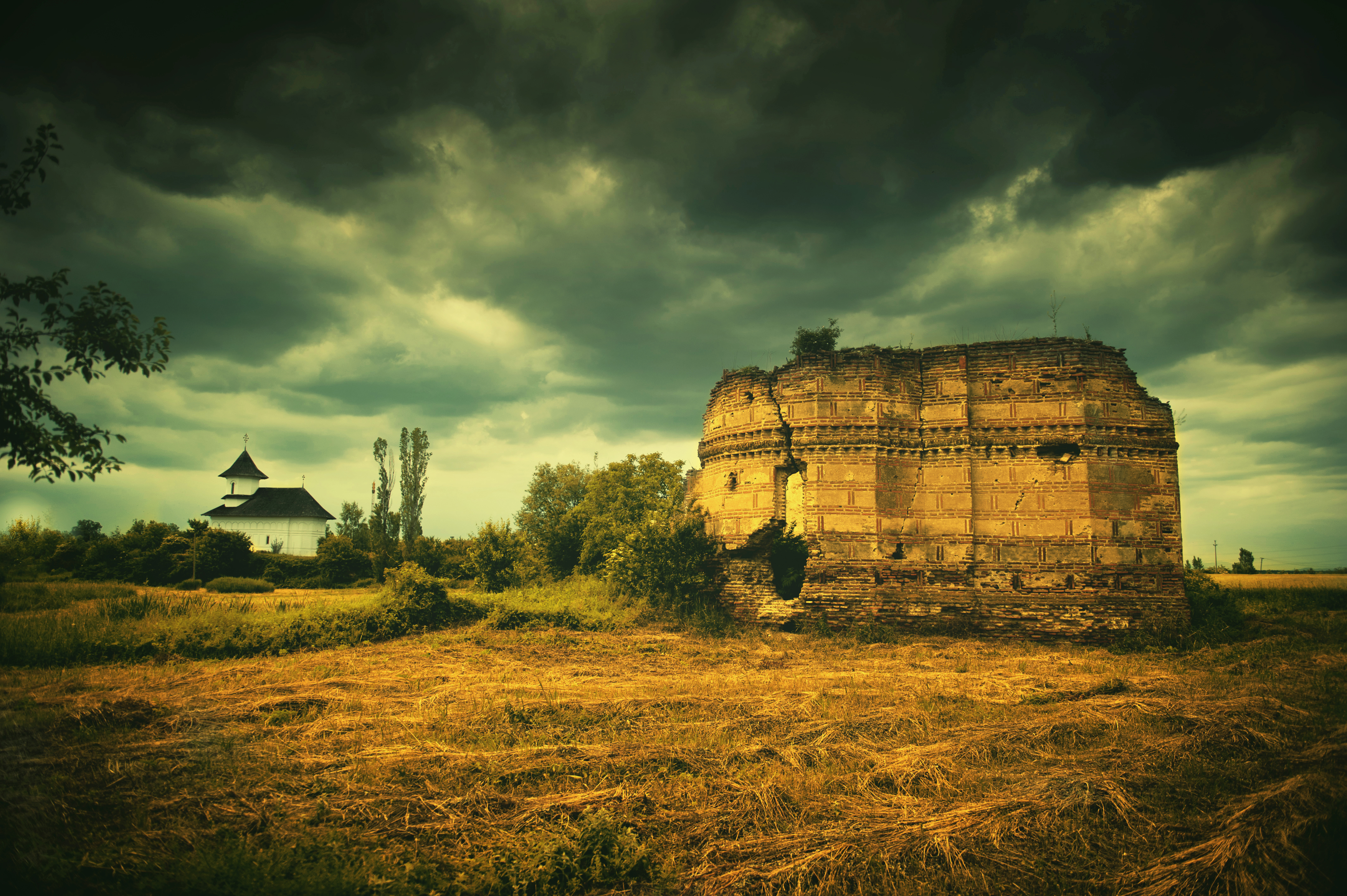
Remains of a church in Târgșor, a town leveled by the Ottoman army in 1659

By then, Constantin was in conflict with the Ottoman Empire, which had originally appointed him as Prince. As reported by the 18th-century chronicler Constantin Filipescu, the relationship between overlord and vassal was sabotaged by Seimeni intrigues: although they had been promised forgiveness for their earlier rebellion, Seimeni refugees in Silistra complained to Mehmed IV that Constantin was a "wicked" man, who intended to lead Wallachia and Transylvania into an anti-Ottoman war. This account is also backed by Xenopol, who writes that the Seimeni used the Ottomans to "avenge a betrayal". Rezachevici notes that, though "unconfirmed by foreign sources", this narrative contains "an echo of the hatred the servants felt toward the man who had betrayed them".

Wallachia was subsequently invaded by the Tatars—who were now allied with the Ottomans. At that stage, the Șoplea victor Pană Filipescu also turned against Prince Constantin. Although some authors suggest that the Seimeni were entirely quashed in 1655–1657, and never recovered, at least 1,000 of these troops were still serving the Prince in December 1656. Constantin's replacement Mihnea III continued the attacks on the boyars, relying on the Seimeni to emancipate himself from Ottoman tutelage. Constantin became his ally by proxy, invading Moldavia from Transylvania in hopes of becoming Prince there. An 18th-century compilation, Letopisețul Cantacuzinesc, notes that the surviving Seimeni pledged their support, using the opportunity to "return to their consecrated theft, spoiling and robbing away the goods of boyars and whatever [else] they could find." The expedition, which involved Seimeni troops on both sides, ended with Constantin's defeat by a Tatar horde, on the Bahlui.

During his brief stay in power before he too was ousted by the Ottomans, Mihnea ordered the execution of Brâncoveanu and Udriște Năsturel, while Pană Filipescu and Filipescu's partisans managed to escape to Transylvania. In 1659, he ultimately captured and executed Buicescul. Mehmed IV's retaliation was severe. As archeologists I. Ionașcu and Vlad Zirra note, the Ottoman army engaged in "indescribable arson and pillaging, to the point where some of [the] urban settlements, such as Gherghița and Târgșor, will be condemned to function as mere villages." In Bucharest, Ottoman soldiers destroyed the vineyards south of Dealul Mitropoliei. The order to demolish all of Târgoviște's fortifications was carried out, leaving the new Prince, Gheorghe I Ghica, to settle permanently in Bucharest. Nonetheless, Seimeni banners continued to be attested after that moment, and then well into the late Phanariote era.

Meanwhile, Hrizea's family had faded into relative obscurity, with neither of his three sons ever holding high office under later Princes. Of them, Matei married Ilina Greceanu, whose father, the Sluger Drăghici Greceanu, had been killed by the Seimeni in 1655. In 1672, the surviving members of the family, including Hrizea's daughter Ilina (by then married to the Spatharios Ivan Rudeanul), sold half of their eponymous estate to a Hrizea Popescu. The land they owned in Verguleasa was also sold to the Costescu boyars, who passed it on to the Olănescu family.
