= Diicul Buicescul =

Wallachian statesman

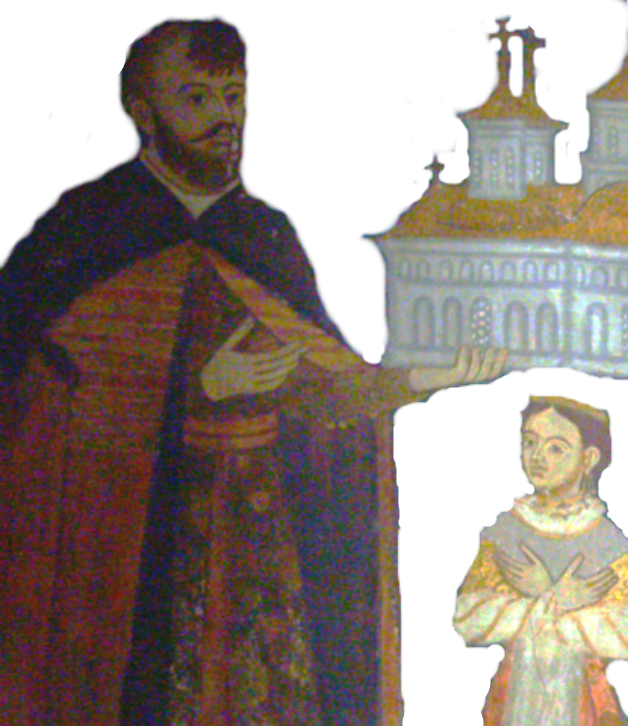
- Buicescul and daughter Ancuța, as ktitors of Clocociov Monastery

Clucer of Wallachia
- In office June 30, 1656 – August 18, 1657
- In office December 9, 1658 – June 12, 1659

Personal details
- Born: unknown date Buicești, Olt County?
- Died: ca. July 1659
- Spouse(s): Dumitra of Arcești; Bălașa?
- Relations: Matei Basarab (cousin or uncle; adoptive father); Elena Năsturel (adoptive mother); Staico Bucșanu (son-in-law); Drăghici Cantacuzino (son-in-law); István Szalánczy (in-law)
- Children: Papa Buicescul; Preda Buicescul; Păuna Cantacuzino; Ancuța; Calița Ghinea; Marica Bucșanca; Ilinca? Toma Buicescul (adopted)

Military service
- Allegiance: Wallachia
- Years of service: 1639–1654
- Rank: Spatharios
- Commands: Wallachian military forces

Diicul or Dicul Buicescul, also known as Diicu Buicescu and Diicu din Epotești (? – ca. July 1659), was a Wallachian statesman, noted as the designated heir of Prince Matei Basarab. A commoner on his father's side, he belonged to the boyardom of Oltenia through his mother's family. His political rise began when Matei, his maternal relative, seized the throne. Diicul alternated civilian offices and command postings in the Wallachian military forces, culminating with his appointment as Spatharios in January 1645. His main military involvement came during the wars opposing Wallachia and the Principality of Transylvania to Vasile Lupu's Moldavia. He saw action during the 1650 invasion of Moldavia, resulting in Gheorghe Ștefan's appointment as the puppet Moldavian Prince. In 1653 Buicescul was soundly defeated by Lupu and his Cossack allies, whose invasion of Wallachia was only overturned by Prince Matei's stand at Finta.

Unpersuaded by claims that Buicescul was arrogant and militarily incompetent, the childless Matei designated Buicescul as his successor. The boyardom rallied around a rival pretender, Constantin Șerban. Sidelined by the Prince and the Spatharios, Șerban orchestrated in 1654 a revolt of the Seimeni mercenaries, which contributed to the weakening of Matei's regime. When the Prince died after illness in early 1655, Șerban managed to outbid Buicescul for the throne, arriving in Târgoviște while his rival was still stranded in Oltenia. A short truce between them was curbed by Buicescul's alleged participation in conspiratorial intrigues; the Spatharios was deposed, then mutilated, to prevent his candidacy for the throne.

In 1655, another Seimeni rebellion drove the Buicesculs into Transylvania. Diicul returned with the Transylvanian troops of George II Rákóczi. Reconciling with Prince Constantin under Rákóczi's tutelage, he served as Wallachia's Clucer, and was reconfirmed as such by Constantin's replacement, Mihnea III. The conflict between Mihnea and his boyars also signaled Diicul's downfall and beheading, which happened in 1659. His son Papa returned to Wallachia and held important office; his grandson Diicul II served as Spatharios under Constantin Brâncoveanu. Diicul's sons-in-law included Drăghici Cantacuzino and Staico Bucșanu, both of whom were important players in late-17th-century Wallachian politics.

== Biography ==
=== Rise ===
Buicescul was probably a native of Buicești, the family's demesne in what is now Olt County. His first name originates with the Bulgarian Dikov, and is ultimately a derivative of "Theodore". He is known to have had at least one sister, from whom he had a favorite nephew, Tudor. Their father was Ioan Buicescul; their mother, Maria (or Mara), was a relative—either niece or cousin—of Aga Matei Basarab. In his overview of Wallachian politics, the Melkite traveler Paul of Aleppo notes that Buicescul was, or was perceived to be, an ibn fellah, translated as "son of peasants" or "son of nobody". As noted by genealogist Constantin Gane, the Buicesculs were commoners of obscure origins. The first recorded member of the family was Diicul's paternal grandfather, the Jupân Mitre. Also according to Gane, Buicești was actually inherited from Maria, having been an estate of the more ancient Craiovești family, from which both Diicul and Aga Matei descended. This account is also backed by scholar I. Ionașcu.

Ionașcu acknowledged the lack of any record detailing Diicul's youth, but proposed that he followed Aga Matei in his perennial battles with Prince Leon Tomșa. He believes that Buicescul may have followed his uncle or cousin in exile to the Principality of Transylvania, refusing Leon's peace offerings. Ultimately, in 1632, Matei seized the throne of Wallachia. In the aftermath, all of the Aga's relatives, including Buicescul, were appointed to high office. On July 6, 1635, Buicescul became a Cupar (Cup-bearer, or assistant Paharnic) for the court in Bucharest, serving to October 20, 1638. From November 1638, he was a Great Șufar, or Intendant, in the Wallachian civil service. From July 3, 1639, to January 30, 1644, Buicescul was Aga, and as such supervised part of the Wallachian military forces. His main assignment was supervising the fortifications of Târgoviște, rebuilt under his watch. This office was not yet annexed to the Boyar Council, but allowed Diicul a steady revenue in bribes, allowing him to purchase more land. In 1641–1642, he was confirmed as the owner of Priseaca, outside Buicești, while also holding deeds in Vitănești and some other Olt villages; in 1644, he bought himself half of Arcești, in Romanați County. In January 1645, the villagers of Bârzoteni, in northern Vâlcea County, sold themselves as serfs to Buicescul.

As summarized by historian Andrea Fehér: "[Buicescul] exhibited serious shortcomings in his character, defects that could not be erased from the chronicles, not even through him founding numerous monasteries. [He] was also infamous for his intrigues, as well as his negative influence on the ruler." Diicul became the main army commander, of Spatharios, on January 8, 1645, serving to April 10, 1654. He was replacing Preda Brâncoveanu, demoted to a much less relevant office. During this period, Buicescul was a noted ktitor for the Wallachian Church, erecting Clocociov Monastery (c. 1645) as well as, with Prince Matei, Pantocrator Monastery of Drăgănești-Vlașca (1647). By 1649, Buicescul had established a wool-trading business with the Transylvanian Saxons of Corona, and, beyond, with the markets of the Polish–Lithuanian Commonwealth.

The Prince also sent his boyar on several diplomatic missions, including at least one sojourn in Transylvania. In Moldavia, Buicescul attended the wedding between Maria, daughter of the Prince Vasile Lupu, and Janusz Radziwiłł. This state visit formed part of several reconciliation attempts between Wallachia and Moldavia, which had been feuding with each other after Lupu's arrival on the throne in 1634. The effort proving fruitless, Spatharios Buicescul was again involved in the intrigues to topple Lupu. In 1650, he coordinated the Wallachian expedition into Moldavia, assisting the Transylvanian general John Kemény. Entering the country through the Valley of Râbna, his troops occupied Focșani. The expedition succeeded in replacing Lupu with the Transylvanian favorite, Gheorghe Ștefan. In his later chronicle of the events, Lupu's loyalist Miron Costin claimed that, in accepting this Prince, Kemény snubbed Buicescul, who had allegedly wanted the Moldavian crown for himself.

Aided by troops from the Cossack Hetmanate, Lupu defeated a large Wallachian force of 9,000 soldiers, commanded by Buicescul, and chased away Ștefan's 300 Moldavian renegades. Here, Costin suggests, Buicescul revealed himself to be an incompetent general, allowing his soldiers to be thinly deployed, and then decimated, along the Milcov. One essential flaw, pointed by other historians, was the Wallachian army's insufficient firepower. Lupu's invasion was nevertheless overturned. Buicescul's own troops were again scattered following a direct confrontation with Tymofiy Khmelnytsky's cavalry at Șoplea, but Prince Matei was able to recover the loss at Finta. The Moldavians were defeated, and Gheorghe Ștefan was reconfirmed as Prince.

=== 1650s conspiracies ===
In 1652, Matei and Princess Elena Năsturel had lost their adoptive son, Mateiaș. This fueled a search for another heir: Mihai, son of Nicolae Pătrașcu, and Istratie Golescu were considered, but Matei finally selected Buicescul—although the latter was by then middle-aged. Other boyars were disappointed with Matei's choice, believing Buicescul to be of flippant and haughty character; they sympathized more with the Serdar Constantin Șerban, born out of wedlock to the former Prince of 1602–1611, Radu Șerban. Buicescul himself had a noted rivalry with the Serdar, particularly after being revealed as an heir apparent. One detailed account, originating with Paul of Aleppo, suggests that Șerban refused to honor the Prince's choice, and never removed his hat if Buicescul was in the room. Their clashes aggravated with time, prompting Prince Matei to arrest Șerban—allegedly, after Buicescul threatened resignation. Buicescul's rival was mutilated, or "carved at the nose", which would have technically invalidated him from ever placing a claim to the throne. Historians disagree on whether this "marking" happened during Șerban's early years or was a consequence of his arrest by Prince Matei.

Wounded at Finta, Matei never fully recovered and, with time, became bedridden. With Elena assuming an informal regency, Șerban coordinated a rebellion of the Seimeni mercenaries, and managed to exhaust the Basarab regime. Although they survived the uprising, both the Princess and Prince were dead by April 1654. This resulted in a heated competition for the throne, during which, historian Gábor Kármán notes, Buicescul emerged as a favorite of the Transylvanian Prince, George II Rákóczi. However, the Spatharios had been called to his country estate by the illness of his son; Șerban, meanwhile, was at Dobreni, allowing him to seize the opportunity and leave for Târgoviște, where the Seimeni imposed him as Prince.

Paul of Aleppo records an important role for the Spatharios during Șerban's investiture, although it is not known if this testimony refers to Buicescul or to his known successor, Hrizea of Bogdănei. The same author informs that "the old Spatharios" was welcomed back from Buicești, and solemnly reconfirmed. However, Buicescul returned to his intrigues, "out of haughtiness and arrogance", prompting the Prince to depose him. Prince Constantin eventually arrested Buicescul and ordered him mutilated with the same "carving at the nose". As noted by Paul of Aleppo, Diicul barely escaped the death penalty, only because "some spoke in his favor". Paul also argues that mutilation was no longer an obstacle for the throne, with Șerban's own nose having "healed".

In late 1654 or early 1655, a new Seimeni revolt placed the boyars in mortal danger; Buicescul and his family escaped by fleeing into Transylvania, settling at Corona. Historian A. D. Xenopol proposes that Rákóczi had extended his personal protection to the Buicesculs. On May 20, he signed his name to a boyars' letter which pleaded with Rákóczi to intervene against the Seimeni "foreigners". The boyars did not endorse Buicescul's claim to the throne, specifically because, they claimed, he had embezzled the Wallachian treasury and all private funds placed in his care. A boyars' letter to Rákóczi, also signed by Wallachian Metropolitan Ignațiu, claimed that the 30,000 thaler Diicul had deposited in Hermannstadt were entirely stolen, in complicity with his nephew Tudor. Rákóczi sided with the boyars and confiscated the money, retaining half of it for his own expenses.

Diicul returned to Wallachia at some point before December 1655. The Seimeni, who had placed Spatharios Hrizea on the Wallachian throne, had by then been defeated and massacred by Transylvanian and Moldavian troops. This maneuver greatly increased Rákóczi's say in Wallachian politics. Upon securing his crown under Transylvania's tutelage, Constantin Șerban also became more tolerant of the Buicescul clan. On June 30, 1656, he made Diicul his Great Clucer, allowing him to serve in that position to August 18, 1657. Around that time, he issued a deed recognizing the Buicesculs as landlords of Arcești.

A new Prince, Mihnea III, seized the throne in early 1658. After a brief hiatus, Buicescul was again appointed Clucer on December 9 of that year, and continued to serve until June 12, 1659. By then, however, he had fallen afoul of the Prince, who ordered a purge of the boyardom. Buicescul was eventually captured and killed before the end of 1659. Various researchers note that the execution was a retaliation for his cooperation with, and matrimonial ties to, the dissident Cantacuzino family. According to historian Constantin Rezachevici, Buicescul and his family belonged to the Cantacuzinos in the larger definition, which is "an actual boyar faction". Some scholars also record that the former Spatharios was killed by decapitation. Ionașcu mentions the general circumstances of this clampdown, proposing that Buicescul may have been killed in a manner similar to other boyars, who were strangled or lynched at Curtea Veche; however, he too notes that Buicescul was actually beheaded, or "slashed". Rezachevici believes that Buicescul and Spatharios Udriște Năsturel were assassinated together at Curtea Veche, in July 1659; the new Clucer was Mihai Argetoianu.

== Legacy ==
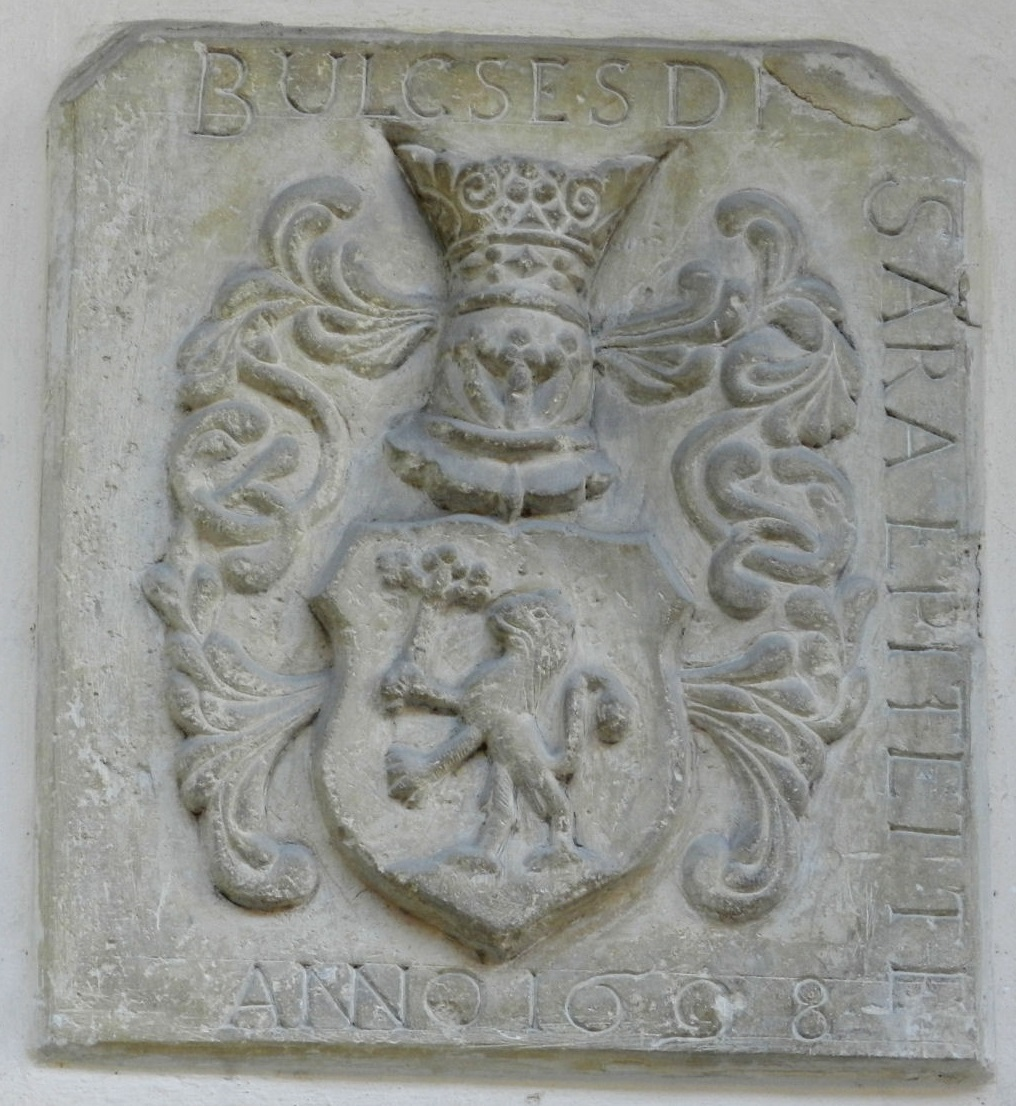
Arms of Sára Bulcsesdi-Székely-Haller, as they appear carved on one side of Rhédey Palace, Cluj-Napoca

Diicul Buicescul was married twice, to a Dumitra of Arcești, and later, according to some disputed records, to a Lady Bălașa. Buicescul's eldest son, the Paharnic Papa, born c. 1630–1633, was probably groomed by Rákóczi to take over as puppet ruler of Wallachia, following his father's mutilation—this alliance was superseded in 1655, when Constantin Șerban willingly submitted to Transylvania's leadership. Nonetheless, Papa remained figure of political importance until his death in 1688. He took in marriage the daughter of another Spatharios, Pană Filipescu, who had helped defeat Hrizea in 1655. A second son, Preda, followed Diicul into Transylvania, and married Ana, a daughter of the diplomat István Szalánczy. According to Ionașcu, the son recorded as ill was neither Papa nor Preda, but an anonymous third, who did not survive 1654; Preda himself died young, in 1656, with Diicul inheriting his wealth. One document suggests that Diicul had also adopted his nephew and alleged accomplice Tudor, who worked as a tax farmer with the title of Great Căminar. Diicul's progeny included at least four daughters: Păuna, Ancuța, Calița and Marica. The Clocociov murals also depict a fifth, Ilinca.

Preda's daughter, born Stanca and later known as Sára (or Stanca) Bulcsesdi-Székely-Haller, was one of the leading aristocrats of Kolozsvár (Cluj); she converted to Calvinism and was a celebrated benefactor of the Reformed Church in Transylvania. In the early 1680, Sara was still litigating over her grandfather's confiscated wealth, also obtaining her share of Papa Buicescul's estate in Wallachia. Through her aunt Păuna, wife of Drăghici Cantacuzino, the Buicescul clan became in-laws with the Cantacuzinos. Buicescul was thus the grandfather of Spatharios Pârvu II Cantacuzino, making him the great-great-grandfather of Pârvu III and Rodion Cantacuzino. Although Papa Buicescul was, later in life, an enemy of Prince Șerban Cantacuzino, this connection spared him his life. The Cantacuzinos honored Diicul's memory, notably by depicting him in a collective fresco at their church in Măgureni. By then, Calița had married Mihăilă Ghinea of Brătășani; their two sons, Drăghici and Fota, never reached political significance. Marica's husband, Staico Bucșanu, was an enemy of Prince Constantin Brâncoveanu, who ordered him hanged ca. 1693; their line was extinguished with his death.

Papa had three children, of whom the only son, Diicul II, served as Spatharios under Prince Brâncoveanu. From 1679, he had also been awarded Transylvanian citizenship and was granted a coat of arms by Michael I Apafi. His estate was sold off: in 1691, Brâncoveanu purchased from Diicul II the village of Gioroc, which he later donated to Horezu Monastery; in 1697, another one of Papa's estates, at Constantinești, was purchased by the local peasants. Having bought himself a new demesne at Bălcești, Diicul II sued his cousin Sára and his nephew Ádám Székely for their share of the Buicescul estate. Diicul II died childless some time after 1705; his main possessions went to Vintilă Bucșanu, and to Bucșanu's daughters. By then, Papa's widow Dumitrana had also sold her land in Bârzoteni to the Starets of Horezu.

At an unknown date, Brâncoveanu also bought Arcești, which had been owned collectively by Papa's daughters. Like his aunts, Diicul II's sisters took prominent boyars as their husbands. Of them, another Stanca married Paharnic Cornea Brăiloiu of Târgu Jiu, who was one of Brâncoveanu's trusted diplomats. Two of their sons, Barbu and Dumitrașco, surrendered to the Habsburg monarchy during the war of 1716, and went on to serve as civilian administrators of Habsburg Oltenia. As revenge, Prince Nicholas Mavrocordatos sent Dumitrașco to a monastery. He had by then fathered a daughter, also named Stanca, whom he married into the Obedeanu family. The Bucșanus also followed suit in supporting the Habsburg party, thus forfeiting their inheritance in Wallachia. Family lands later returned to his daughters, and passed to Gavrilașco Mavrocordat, then to the Hriscoscoleu family; in 1766, Bălcești was eventually sold to the ancestors of writer Nicolae Bălcescu.

The Culcer's descendants into the 18th century include Sára's grandson, Count László Székely, who was an acclaimed contributor to Hungarian literature, as well as a major book collector. Buicescul's distant memory was by then becoming altered—Count Székely's memoirs include no mention of his great-grandfather, though they dwell on Sára's successive marriages. Various genealogies of the late 19th century preserve distorted versions of Diicul's name: he appears as Dicescul-Buncescul in Aleksey Lobanov-Rostovsky's Russian Genealogical Book, and as Dudulescu-Buntescu in Eugène Rizo-Rangabé's Cantacuzino tree. Based on such misreadings, Buicescul was spuriously identified by scholar Paul Gore as a patriarch of the Dicescu family in Bessarabia Governorate. According to Gane, Diicul still had genuine descendants in 1930s Greater Romania, if only through his daughters. This family was known by variant of the ancestral surname, Boicescu, notably used by Nicolae A. Boicescu. The latter was especially noted as a friend and confidant of the writer Mateiu Caragiale. He married Smaranda "Lileta" Năsturel, a collateral descendant of Udriște Năsturel; in 1928, the couple still lived in Boicești. Their son, Diicu Boicescu, worked as an editor for the Romanian Academy Press.
