= Udriște Năsturel =

Wallachian scholar, poet, and statesman

Udriște Năsturel (Năsturelovici)
- Coat of arms used by Năsturel
- Born: 1596 or 1598; Herăști, Ilfov County
- Died: ca. 1658 (aged 59–63); Curtea Veche, Bucharest
- Occupations: statesman, diplomat, book publisher, scribe, schoolteacher, translator, landowner
- Writing career
- Pen name: Ioriste Năsturel, Oreste Năsturel, Uriil (or Uril) Năsturel
- Period: 1629–1654
- Genres: lyric poetry, blason, epigram, epitaph, essay, hagiography
- Literary movement: Renaissance humanism Baroque

Udriște Năsturel, first name also Uriil, Uril, Ioriste, or Oreste, last name also Năsturelovici (1596 or 1598 – ca. 1658), was a Wallachian scholar, poet, and statesman, the brother-in-law of Prince Matei Basarab through his sister Elena Năsturel. Together, the three staged a cultural revival centered on Bucharest and Târgoviște. Năsturel had risen through the ranks of the Wallachian bureaucracy and had served Radu Mihnea's government in Moldavia, being kept as Logothete by Matei Basarab. In office, he had international correspondence and went on diplomatic travels through Central Europe, also overseeing the printing presses. He was the titular boyar of Herăști, known in his day as Fierești and Fierăști, where he built a palace that stands as a late example of Renaissance architecture, and earned him a regional fame.

Năsturel was primarily an advocate of Old Church Slavonic, the courtly language. He was one of its last exponents in Romanian literature, and taught it to students at the school in Târgoviște. His favorite forms of expression were the essay and the rhyming preface, but he also perfected a Slavonic answer to the blason, which remained influential for two centuries and was, by some accounts, the first known poem by a Romanian. Năsturel, who made mention of the people's Latin origin, also used the Romanian vernacular, in which he notably produced a translation of Barlaam and Josaphat. In his original works, his themes and his linguistic obscurities show a Baroque streak, while his core ideology has been linked to Renaissance humanism. An Eastern Orthodox theologian and a ktitor within the Wallachian Metropolis, he was nevertheless attracted to Counter-Reformation ideas, and published Catholic-inspired propaganda against Calvinism. Năsturel was versed in both Renaissance Latin and classical scholarship, putting out a Slavonic rendition of The Imitation of Christ.

Udriște's firstborn, Mateiaș, was adopted by the princely couple and groomed as heir to the throne, but died in 1652, before reaching maturity. This event inspired the Logothete to write his last poem, a conventional epitaph. His sister died in 1653, and his brother-in-law a year later. Năsturel survived the rise of Constantin Șerban, being for a while reappointed as Spatharios, although he was cousins with the rebel leader Hrizea. A new Prince, Mihnea III, identified Năsturel as one of the boyars standing in the way of his political projects and included him in his murderous purge. The Spatharios was strangled at Curtea Veche, and his body was desecrated in the streets of Bucharest. He was survived by another son, Radu Toma, who held major political offices under George Ducas. His direct line of descent was maintained until the 1874 death of Constantin Năsturel-Herescu.

== Biography ==
=== Origins ===
Despite its claim to have originated in Roman Dacia and its alleged links to the Fogoras nobility, the Năsturel clan was first attested as belonging to boyardom in the late 15th century. A period document by "Vlad Vodă", brother of Radu the Great, confirms that, by 1501, the Năsturels were long established as the owners of Herăști (traditionally in Ilfov County, now in Giurgiu) and other Wallachian villages. The same document suggests that Vrăjoghie, the family patriarch, was "of My Highness' own house", namely the House of Basarab. A 19th-century author, Dimitrie Papazoglu, also argued that the family had a deep connection to the village, and later capital city, of Bucharest, suggesting that they were the builders of an ancient church in Dobroteasa mahala. He also proposed that Herăști took its name from a family patriarch, "Count" Herea Năsturel. The genealogical link with the ruling princes was in any case enhanced ca. 1600, when Udriște's father, the Postelnic and Logothete Radu Năsturel, married Despina, a cousin or niece of Michael the Brave. According to researcher Constantin Gane, Despina, known as Cala in some sources, may have been the daughter of boyar Radu Calomfirescu.

Udriște was probably born in 1596, although other sources also propose 1598. It is also believed that he was a native of Herăști, which he once described as "my parental village". Radu and Despina had two other sons, Șerban and Cazan, both of whom were probably older than Udriște. His first name, Udriște, is an archaic, now obscure, derivative from "Adrian". Năsturel, like other scholars, mistakenly believed that it was from "Uriel" and akin to "Orestes", sometimes signing himself as Uri(i)l, Orest, or Ioriste. His family name originates with nasture ("button"); he sometimes used the variant Năsturelovici, with a Slavic suffix, as was the fashion among intellectual boyars.

Șerban, Cazan, and Udriște also had two sisters. One was the future Stanca Popescu. The other, known to have been Udriște's junior, was Elena (Eliana) Năsturel. According to Gane, she and Udriște were the most educated of Radu's children, being taught to read and write in Church Slavonic and Koine Greek, and being introduced to art and history. Their father also displayed an interest in Renaissance literature; he had confiscated or bought a copy of Thomas à Kempis' The Imitation of Christ, in the Latin, while fighting a war in Moldavia. Helped by a private tutor, Udriște used that same book to learn Latin, which he could speak to perfection. In addition to Latin, Slavonic and Greek, Udriște was fluent in Russian. Some authors have suggested that Năsturel also attended school in Kiev Voivodeship, but this is not attested by any contemporary source.

=== Debut ===
By 1618, Udriște had joined the Wallachian bureaucracy, being attested, alongside his brother Șerban, as a scribe (diac) to the court of Prince Radu Mihnea. When the latter took over as Prince of Moldavia, Năsturel followed, and, in 1625, was attested as a scribe for the court in Hârlău. Returning to Bucharest, he maintained this function under successive reigns, including that of Alexandru IV Iliaș. In 1629, Leon Tomșa promoted him to Logothete of his privy council. Also that year, Năsturel published the first of his many Slavonic prefaces, for a Nomocanon edition printed at Kiev. According to historian George Potra, he was the official translator for Prince Radu Iliaș when, in early 1632, Bucharest was visited by Paul Strassburg, diplomat of the Swedish Empire.

From 1625, Năsturel had been married to Maria Corbeanu, of the Corbi boyars. He was also brother-in-law of another Logothete, Radu Staico Popescu. At age 35, his other sister, Elena, became Wallachia's Princess-consort. As a teenager (most likely in 1613), she had married Aga Matei, later styled "Matei Basarab", who controlled an army of Seimeni mercenaries in Bucharest. In late 1632, at age 53, Matei defeated Radu Iliaș and took the throne for himself. Elena played a direct part in Wallachia's administration shortly after this—namely, during the interval when Matei negotiated his confirmation by Wallachia's suzerain power, the Ottoman Empire. Udriște's father, Radu, served as the country's treasurer (Vistier) during the same hiatus.

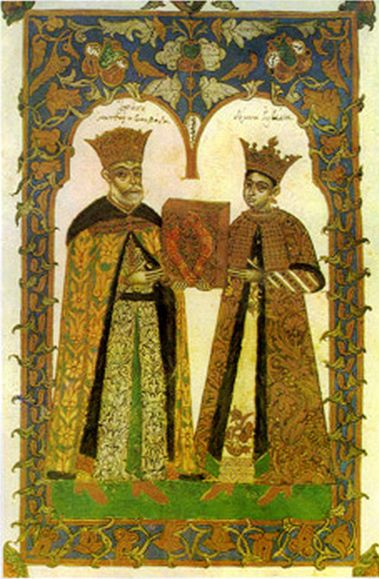
Matei Basarab and Elena Năsturel in a period manuscript

After Matei secured his throne in 1633, Elena turned to cultural endeavors, one of the principal sponsors and promoters of early Romanian literature. Udriște, a Logethete of the court in 1632, partook directly in her experiment. He is for instance credited with having helped the princely couple set up three printing presses, at Câmpulung, Dealu Monastery, and Băile Govora. As Logothete, he directed the Chancellery, which issued some 1,300 documents during his tenure, all of them surviving. His correspondence attests links with intellectuals of various faiths: the Orthodox Gavrilo Rajić, Macarios Zaim, Peter Mogila, and Meletios Sirigos; and the Catholic Rafael Levaković, with whom he discussed the Nicene Creed. He also had oratorical duels with Constantin Cantacuzino, with bishops Varlaam Moțoc and Ștefan I, as well as with his sister the Princess.

In 1635, Năsturel published a Slavonic ode to the Basarab family, included in the standardized prayer book, or Molitvenic. These lyrics endure as the first Wallachian example of the genre called blason (la stemă) poetry. This became an incidental record for heraldists studying the coat of arms of Wallachia, describing the bird as a raven rather than as a standard golden eagle. The detail may also indicate his familiarity with legends about Radu Negru as the founder of Wallachia. According to George Călinescu, the blason has the first known rhymes in Romanian literature, although the part-Wallachian Nicolaus Olahus is known to have been writing Latin poetry before 1510. The first lay poems in Romanian appeared some 40 years after Năsturel's piece, and were composed by a Saxon, Valentin Franck von Franckenstein.

=== Main work period ===
An "editor by excellence of prefaces to books", but one who "never signed his works", Năsturel is identified as the author of the foreword to Matei Basarab's standard legal code, Pravila de la Govora. Here, he explains the effort to collect and translate relevant literature, deploring the "scarcity and shortage of such books". Scholars also regard him as the author of the preface to another legal code, the 1652 Îndreptarea Legii. The latter text abounds in references to classical lawmakers, from Lycurgus of Sparta and Hippocrates to Justinian I and Leo the Wise. With his activity in the field, he aimed especially at countering the influence of Calvinism, publishing in 1642, and again in 1644, a propaganda booklet called The Learning Gospel. Varlaam Moțoc reports that he collected Calvinist propaganda to document the spread of its "poison, which kills the soul".

Although he was an Orthodox, scholars such as Virgil Cândea link Năsturel mainly with the Counter-Reformation and a religious subset of Renaissance humanism. Cândea argued against other authors who described Năsturel as an actual humanist, noting that he was a mere precursor to the belated surfacing of a Wallachian humanism later that century. This critique was also embraced by literary historian Eugen Negrici, who argues that the Logothete was only a humanist in the sense that he had an intellectual life, which, though "extremely rare in that era", never implied complex scholarship. As rated by Negrici, Năsturel never was a "paradigmatic figure of European humanism." Cultural historian Răzvan Theodorescu also discusses Năsturel as one of the Catholic-leaning boyars at Matei Basarab's court, placing him in relation with Paisios Ligarides, who wanted to bridge the Great Schism. As argued by Theodorescu, Năsturel's interest in Thomas à Kempis unwittingly linked him with the ideology of the Catholic Baroque, which was also based on the Imitation.

According to historian Petre P. Panaitescu, Năsturel should be regarded as illustrative for the last "thriving stage" of Slavonic writing in Wallachia, or what Theodorescu describes as the "consolidation of cultural Slavonism". Over time, he specialized in the authorship of rhyming prefaces in Slavonic, which endure as "classical landmarks of that cultural moment." The first one of these was published in 1643, at Câmpulung, for a yearbook of sermons. It was a contribution to Matei's genealogical legend, insisting on his kinship with Neagoe Basarab and describing his as a "good reign" of "great charity". He followed up with a version of The Imitation of Christ, printed in 1647 and also containing a lyrical preface. Gane argues that Princess Elena co-wrote some of the text, which is modeled on the Russian recension of Church Slavonic. The final edition, put out at Dealu, was decorated with the Năsturels' coat of arms. Its crest included a red tower, possibly borrowed from the Transylvanian arms.

The latter preface is noted for its musings on the origin of the Romanian vernacular, with Năsturel recognizing it as a "relative of Latin". However, as Negrici notes, his very retention of Slavonic showed that he was "hostile to the Romanian language". Historian and culture critic Nicolae Iorga also argued that, given a context in which very few could read Slavonic, translating The Imitation of Christ into that language was "pointless", an exercise in "pretentious erudition". All of Năsturel's Slavonic poetry, including "epigrams on Greek names" or those he dedicated to Elena, has lexical obscurities and intricate wordplay, leading various specialists to conclude that his was a local manifestation of Baroque literature. Ethnologist Costion Nicolescu describes it as "rhetorical, pompous and artificial", "addressing an elite of intellectuals and the Chancellery". According to Theodorescu, Năsturel was a "man of wide-ranging culture", but did not read all of the authors he cited. His verse is "pedantic", its use of Slavonic "already anachronistic"; the main function is to "direct" and feed a "courtly culture", which is on par with other European manifestations. Iorga contends that, overall, Năsturel lacked literary skill and originality, being inferior to his Moldavian counterpart, Grigore Ureche.

Historian Zoltán Tóth argues that Năsturel's work, alongside those of Moldavians Varlaam Moțoc and Dosoftei, unwittingly evidences that "the promotion of the mother tongue [...] was initially the result of the relegation of Slavism to the background, due to the lack of knowledge of the Church Slavic language, and thus a practical requirement within the Orthodox Church itself". In addition to his Slavonic writing, the Logothete also used Romanian in translation work, known to include an acclaimed version of the novel Barlaam and Josaphat. However, it survives only through reprints from the 1670s and later. Scholar Maria Stanciu Istrate, who studied these versions, argues that they suggest an adaptation of Latin rhetoric to the developing literary language, taking many liberties from the strictures of the Russo-Slavonic copies he was using. The result, she finds, was artificial and "mannerist", without a viable representation in the spoken language, but nonetheless a landmark text. Critic Marius Chivu finds the translation to be both loose and "flawless", rewritten with an "amazing clarity" despite the weight of its subject matter.

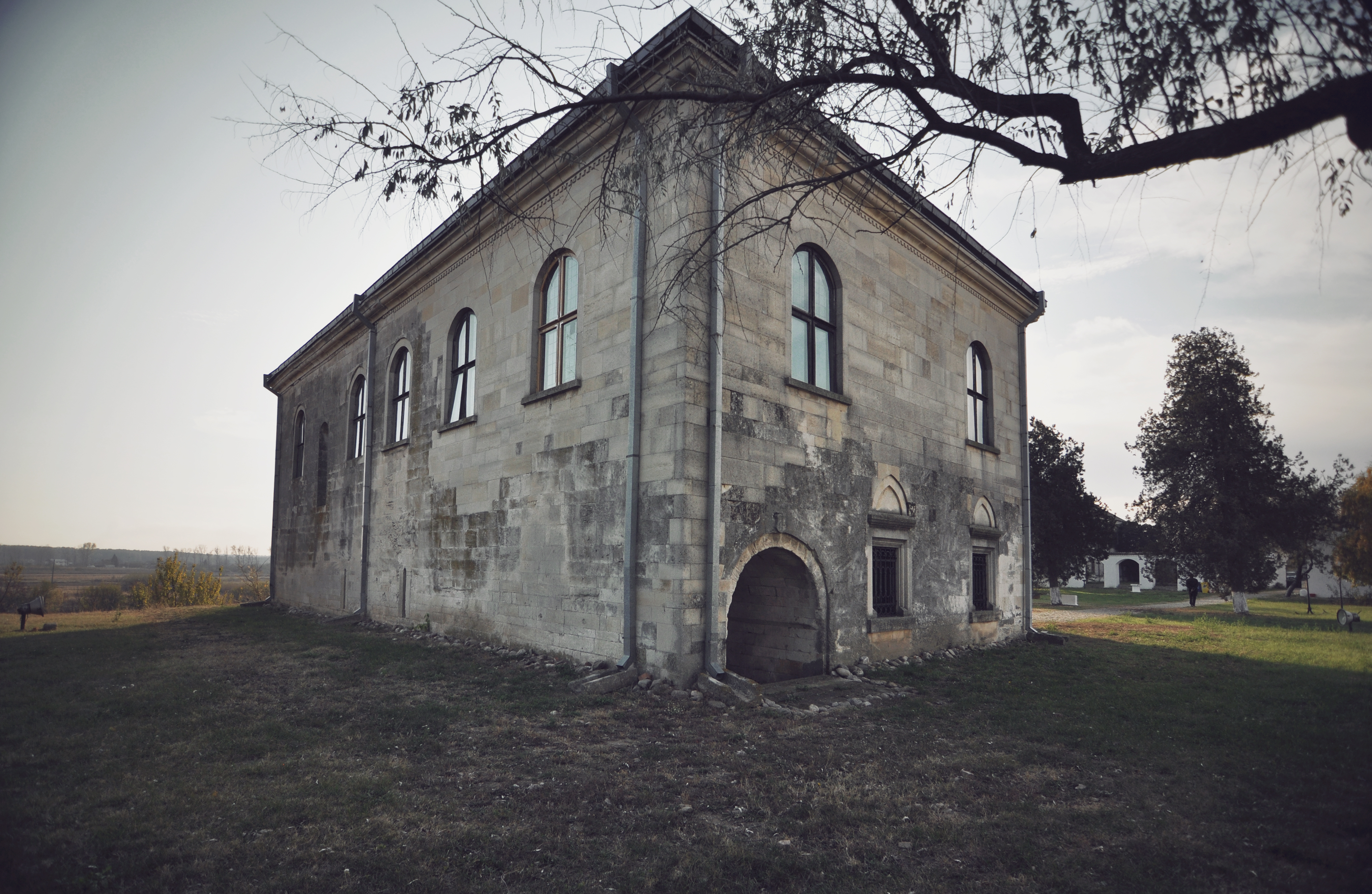
Năsturel manor in Herăști, 2011 photograph

Panaitescu sees Năsturel as potentially responsible for the effort to collect fragmentary historiographic texts and arrange them into an ideologically coherent whole. This effort, Panaitescu argues, eventually produced part of the compilation known as Letopisețul Cantacuzinesc. Năsturel's blason poem was also republished in the Romanian in 1643, then republished in 1644. He may have written various other poems in the vernacular, but they appear lost. One scholarly theory proposes that the Logothete also contributed the first Romanian version of Neagoe's political manual, or Teachings, and a hagiography of Niphon of Kafsokalyvia. Philologist Sextil Pușcariu attributes him a second hagiographic translation, which tells the story of Great Martyr Catherine. Iorga and Boris Unbegaun also credit Năsturel as the translator of a Russian account of the fall of Constantinople.

=== Peak influence ===
His father and his brother Șerban were no probably no longer alive by the time of his ascendancy; Cazan, who was still active, never joined the Boyar Council, and only held the rank of Bucharest ispravnic. Năsturel and Maria's first son, Mateiaș, was born in 1635; some two weeks later, Maria died, leaving the child to be adopted by his godparents, Prince Matei and Princess Elena. He was groomed by the couple as Wallachia's heir-presumptive. Udriște later remarried, to a Despa, with whom he had another son, Radu Toma, and a daughter, Măricuța. He educated his second son at home, arranging him to be tutored in Latin by a scholar Teodor of Kiev. Radu Toma was also an early scribe for his manuscript of Barlaam and Josaphat.

Throughout most of his career, Năsturel probably resided in the old capital, Târgoviște, leaving on diplomatic missions to the Polish–Lithuanian Commonwealth and the Habsburg monarchy (1638), then more regularly to the Principality of Transylvania (1648/9, 1652, 1655). Târgoviște hosted his own lyceum, the Schola Graeca et Latina, staffed by Kievan expatriates; in parallel, Năsturel himself taught at the Slavonic School, which existed in the same city. This educational effort combined his focus on upholding the Latin origin of the Romanians, but also their commitment to Orthodoxy.

By 1645, the Logothete's summer home in Herăști had been rebuilt as a three-story palatial residence. According to Gane, the process was already complete during Radu Năsturel, but other sources suggest that the construction was by Udriște and Cazan. According to Theodorescu, it shows Udriște as an innovator in the field of architecture, going beyond the stylistic guidelines endorsed by Matei Basarab, and contrasting the conservative tastes of Moldavian boyars. He rates it as the "most interesting monument of its day", a late sample of Renaissance architecture with Oriental elements. Herăști was held by scholar Pavel Chihaia as evidence that Matei Basarab's Wallachia, as part of its "second Renaissance", had something resembling Baroque architecture. It had a "fairly large library", which reportedly contained the works of Plato and Aristotle, as well as Aristophanes, Homer, Diogenes Laërtius, Epicurus, Strabo, Suetonius, and Lucian.

The Herăști building impressed a foreign traveler, Paul of Aleppo, who claimed that no other such home existed in the Danubian Principalities, and nowhere in Europe except the Kingdom of France. Paul was also perplexed that the monument was built so close to the Danube, in an exposed location on the Wallachian Plain, which could allow it to be ransacked by Ottoman invaders. It is however known that Năsturel kept a second such home, in Transylvania, alongside his lesser residences in Târgoviște and Bucharest. He and Elena co-funded the church in Herăști, with Udriște alone being the ktitor of Târgului Church in Târgoviște. The former building was partly designed by a Mamant Barbulov, possibly a naturalized Bulgarian, who may have added the Oriental brickwork to the nearby palace. Năsturel is also listed as a ktitor of Sfânta Vineri Herasca in Bucharest, which was located close to his townhouse. In fact, he and Elena supported financially rather than built the latter.

=== Downfall and assassination ===
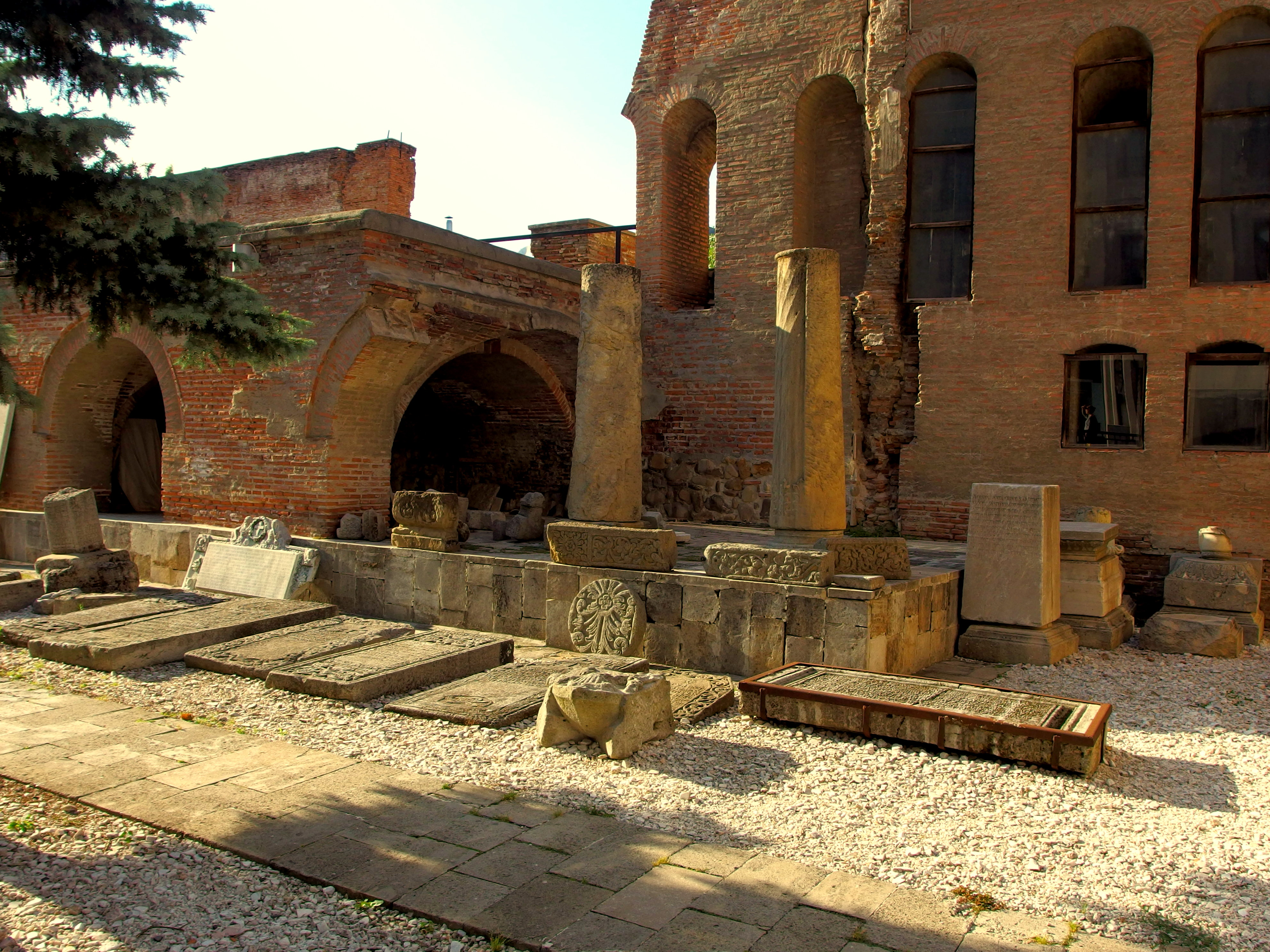
The remains of Curtea Veche, site of Năsturel's killing

Năsturel's last known published work was another preface for a sermon anthology, which came out in 1649. It is addressed to the monks of Mount Athos, containing Năsturel's ideas "on generosity". The text is rated by Nicolescu as a "small treatise", while Negrici argues that it is not at all worthy of that title, being "in fact a few pages long". He lost his first-born in 1652. Mateiaș died in the princely home, after having freed the peasants and slaves living on all his personal properties. A letter by Prince Matei records the princely couple's "great distress". However, when he began searching for a new heir, he omitted Radu Toma and focused on Mihai, orphaned son of the former Prince Nicolae Pătrașcu, then on Istratie Leurdeanu, and finally on Diicul Buicescul.

This period coincided with mounting political troubles, introduced after a war with Moldavia: victorious but wounded, Prince Matei faced a Seimeni rebellion stoked by the pretender Constantin Șerban. Princess Elena died in August 1653, shortly after having helped avert a more serious crisis. She left her personal estate to her surviving godson. Năsturel authored Mateiaș's rhyming epitaph. His last work in Romanian, it is seen by Theodorescu as "conventional and so very bland", largely an adaptation of Baroque dedications. Also according to Theodorescu, Năsturel brought into the country the sculptor Elias Nicolai, who carved the sarcophagus hosting Mateiaș's remains and the epitaph. The Logothete led a more obscure existence during the final stage of Matei Basarab's reign and beyond. The Prince died in early 1654, allowing Constantin Șerban to take the throne. Năsturel continued to serve as a diplomat and, in spring 1656, was sent on a state visit to Moldavia and the Cossack Hetmanate. As noted by historian Petronel Zahariuc, during his stay in Iași he may have helped draft the Slavonic writ whereby Gheorghe Ștefan reestablished the Vasilian College; its linguistic intricacies have long presented a challenge for Romanian translators.

There followed new uprisings against the perceived usurper Constantin Șerban. Among his opponents was Năsturel's cousin, Hrizea (or Hrizică) of Bogdănei, who proclaimed himself Prince and, after a series of battles, was captured and executed in September 1657. Dates proposed for Năsturel's own death range from 1657 to 1659. In his last years, he had been replaced as Logothete and was an acting Spatharios of the Wallachian military forces. Various chronicles note that Năsturel was murdered upon the advent of Mihnea III (1658–1659), after originally serving him. According to an 18th-century overview by Constantin Filipescu, Mihnea plotted an anti-Ottoman uprising, and for this purpose staged a "godless" purge of the unruly boyars. Udriște and various of his Council peers were kidnapped at Curtea Veche, strangled, and thrown out the window into the street below; their bodies were trampled upon by the princely infantry.

The Saxon notary Georg Krauss provides additional details "from reliable sources", namely that the murdered boyars had not approved of Mihnea's plans to align Wallachia with Transylvania in the anti-Ottoman alliance. Krauss claims that the male victims were only half-strangled, then left to wander the halls with no food, until they killed and ate each other; their boyaresses, meanwhile, were stripped down and tied together in sacks with feral cats, who mauled and ate them. A text included in Letopisețul Cantacuzinesc argues that the boyars were indeed strangled, but individually, as they left the staged feast to go out for walks (la primblare). Constantin Rezachevici, who proposes, against other historians, that the event took place in July 1659, notes that the victims of this massacre also included Buicescul; the latter is also argued by historian Alexandru Ciorănescu. A defaced tombstone kept at the National Museum of Romanian History, which shows the figure of a man dressed in 17th-century court attire, was identified by Iorga as belonging to Năsturel. It includes a fragmentary Slavonic dedication suggesting that the subject had died on a Wednesday, at two o'clock in the morning.

== Legacy ==
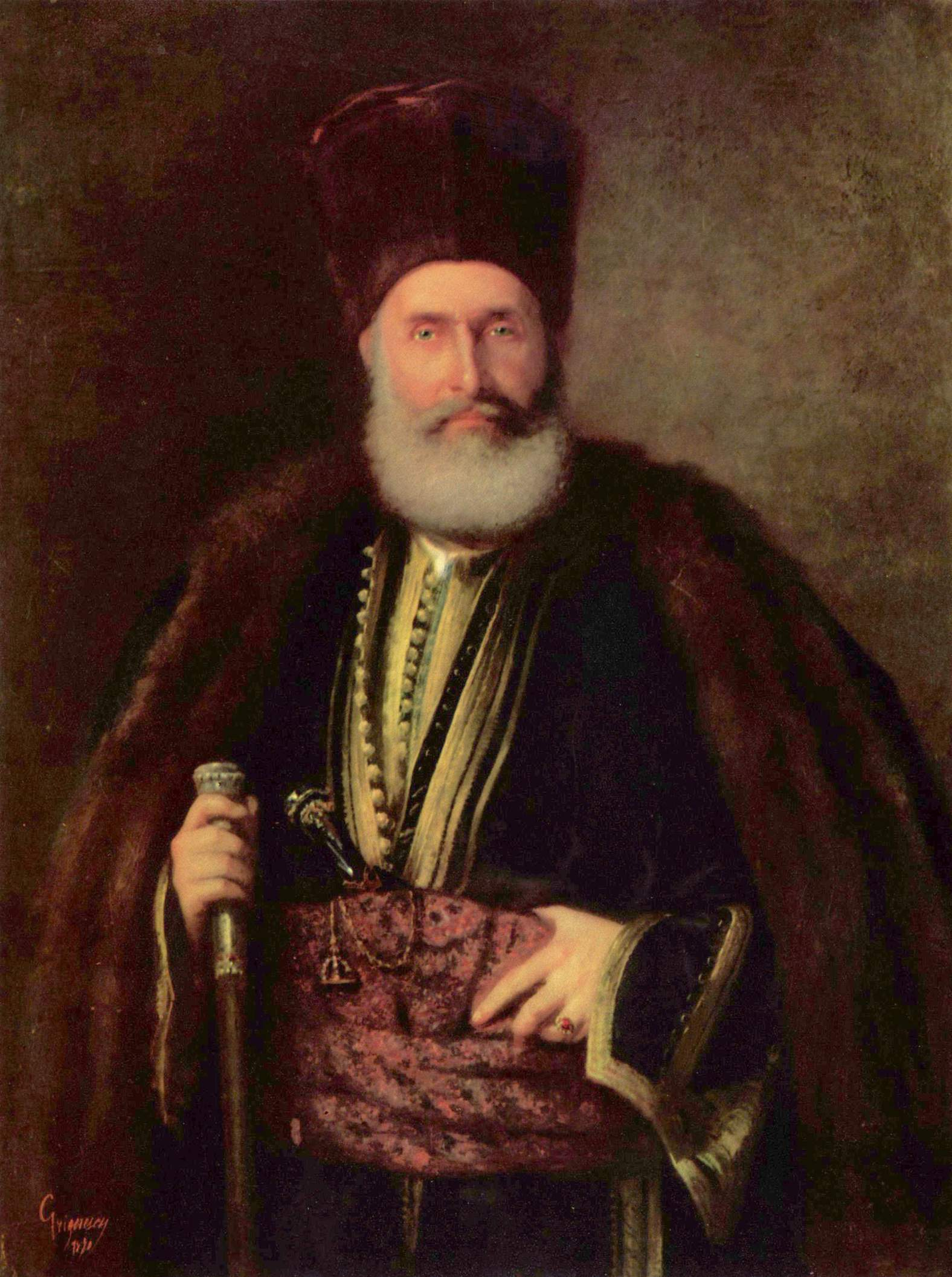
Constantin Năsturel-Herescu, Udriște's last direct heir. 1870 portrait by Nicolae Grigorescu

Later generations held Năsturel in more esteem. According to Papazoglu, the street and area around his Bucharest home, near present-day's Calea Victoriei, became known as Udricani, in his memory. The family's cultural mission was carried on by Radu Toma, who, in 1669, founded the first Wallachian school to offer courses in both Romanian and Slavonic, and offered tuition to disadvantaged children. He also pursued a career in politics, obtaining the title of Ban on two separate occasions: 1674/5–1677, under George Ducas, and 1679/80–1687/88, under Constantin Brâncoveanu. He was attested as a protector of the Catholic community, contributing to the reestablishment of the Bucharest Bărăția. His daughter Marica married Logothete Constantin III Cantacuzino, and then Prince Brâncoveanu's Sluger, Grigorașcu Băleanu.

Through his sister and the Popescu family, Udriște was an ancestor of Radu Popescu, who sided with the Băleanu family in their conflict with Brâncoveanu, and is credited as author of the Băleanu Chronicle. Brâncoveanu's age ended shortly after the Pruth River Campaign of 1711, which was the first of several Russo-Turkish Wars to involve Wallachia and Moldavia. In its wake, a number of Wallachian boyars chose emigration to Imperial Russia over the risk of facing Ottoman reprisals for their insubordination. They include one of Năsturel's descendants, Captain Udrea or Andrei Herescu. His grandson was the Russian poet and academic Mikhail Kheraskov.

Theodorescu argues that Năsturel's contribution as a palace commissioner is enduring, being a direct precursor of experiments in the 18th-century Brâncovenesc style. His literary adaptation, the blason, remained a standard and forme fixe in Romanian poetry into the 19th century, even after Slavonic had been dropped. As noted by Negrici, this pattern was exceedingly conservative, characterized by "stereotypes and repetition". The Năsturel family, which continued to be associated with Udricani and Dobroteasa down to the 1840s, also used Udriște's coat of arms, although this practice was tolerated, rather than endorsed, by a succession of Wallachian Princes. In 1831, it transferred Herăști to Miloš Obrenović, whose Serbian princely family later sold the domain to a Romanian politician, Anastase Stolojan. The Năsturels developed another property, Năsturelu in Teleorman County, which housed a model farm and lands providing for the upkeep of Sfânta Vineri Herasca.

Udriște's descendants in the United Principalities included General Constantin Năsturel-Herescu (1796–1874), noted for his sponsorship of a Romanian Academy award, which included a land donation in Năsturelu. According to Gane and Potra, he was the last of his family. In fact, this extinction refers to the family's male branch. In the Kingdom of Romania, other figures continued to claim descent from the scholar, including another general, Petre Vasiliu-Năsturel, who republished Udriște's Barlaam and Josaphat in Ioan Bianu's collection of early Romanian literature (1904). Vasiliu-Năsturel published works looking into the family's own genealogy and heraldry, which had also interested Bogdan Petriceicu Hasdeu, a pioneer in the field, in the 1860s. Also active in that period, N. I. Herescu was often assumed to be a relative of the Năsturels, but in fact had no known genealogical connection to them.

During the late 1940s, a communist regime in Romania confiscated, then collectivized, the family's land in Năsturelu, as well as the academy's plot there. The palace at Herăști, devastated by a fire in 1931, was also confiscated from the Stolojans. Eventually restored to its original state in the 1960s, it was later assigned to the Romanian Village Museum. In parallel, Udriște Năsturel's work was being reviewed by a new generation of scholars, including Dan Horia Mazilu, with his first-ever monograph, published in 1974. Of the landmarks associated with Udriște Năsturel, Sfânta Vineri Herasca did not survive the communist period: heavily damaged in the March 1977 earthquake, it was restored, but then swiftly demolished as part of the Ceaușima campaign. Images of Herăști were chosen for a stamp, issued by the Romanian Post on Năsturel's 352nd commemoration, marked in late 1983.

Following the Romanian Revolution of 1989, there was a revival of interest in Udriște Năsturel's work. A 2000 edition of his Barlaam and Josaphat, overseen by Cândea, contributed to this trend. According to Chivu, it revised a period when the book had fallen into obscurity, following the discovery of its "striking similarities" with the hagiography of the Gautama Buddha. Herăști became property of the Romanian Peasant Museum in 1990, but in 2013 was returned to the Stolojans. Later descendants of the Logothete include Petre Ș. Năsturel (1923–2012), also a heraldist and art historian who lived in exile following the communist takeover. His "last public intervention", in June 2009, was dedicated to Udriște and his ecumenism.
