= Io (princely title) =

Contracted title used by the royalty of former Moldavia and Wallachia

- Samples of Io in various hands, with dates of use
- Creation: c. 1370
- First holder: Vladislav I of Wallachia
- Extinction date: 18th century

Io (Church Slavonic: Ιω, Їѡ and Иѡ, also Iωан and Iωнь; Romanian Cyrillic: Iѡ; Greek: Ίω) is the contraction of a title used mainly by the royalty (hospodars or voivodes) in Moldavia and Wallachia, preceding their names and the complete list of titles. First used by the Asenid rulers of the Second Bulgarian Empire, the particle is the abbreviation of theophoric name Ioan (John), which comes from the original Hebrew Yohanan, meaning "God has favored". Io appeared in most documents (written or engraved), as issued by their respective chancelleries, since the countries' early history, but its frequency and relative importance among the princely attributes varied over time. Its usage probably dates back to the foundation of Wallachia, though it spread to Moldavia only in the 15th century. In more informal contexts, Romanians occasionally applied the title to benefactors or lieges from outiside the two countries, including John Hunyadi and George II Rákóczi.

Initially used with Slavonic and Latin versions of documents, the word increasingly appeared in Romanian-language ones after 1600. With time, the Wallachian Io also came to be used by some women of the princely household, including Elena Năsturel and Doamna Marica. The arrival of the Phanariotes as rulers in both countries also ended the practice of avoiding the name "John" for Princes, and created duplications of the original styling, as "Io John". As it entered more general use and its meaning was obscured, the title was gradually confounded with the first-person pronoun, Eu, and alternated with the royal we, Noi, until being finally replaced by it in the 19th century. With the rise of modern historiography, Io's meaning and origin became entangled in lasting scholarly disputes. A final attempt to revive it for Carol as Domnitor of the United Principalities was made by Alexandru Papiu Ilarian in 1866.

== History ==
=== Early usage ===
The ultimate origin of Io is with the Biblical Yohanan (Hebrew: יוֹחָנָן), a reference to the divine right, and, in the baptismal name "John", an implicit expression of thanks for the child's birth; the abbreviation is performed as with other nomina sacra, but appears as Ioan in Orthodox Church ectenia. The Slavonic Ιω very often features a tilde over the second letter, which is indicative of a silent "n". Io is therefore described by scholar Emil Vârtosu as "both name and title". Its connection to the name "John", and its vocalization as Ioan, are explicitly mentioned by Paul of Aleppo, who visited Wallachia in the 1650s. However, he provides no explanation for why this particular name was favored. Historian Radu G. Păun describes it specifically as a "theophoric name", which "served to highlight that princely power derives directly from God and not from an intermediary agency". Theologian Ion Croitoru argues that Io placed Wallachian and Moldavian Princes under the patronage of John the Evangelist, and that it doubles as a reference to their status as defenders of the Orthodox faith.

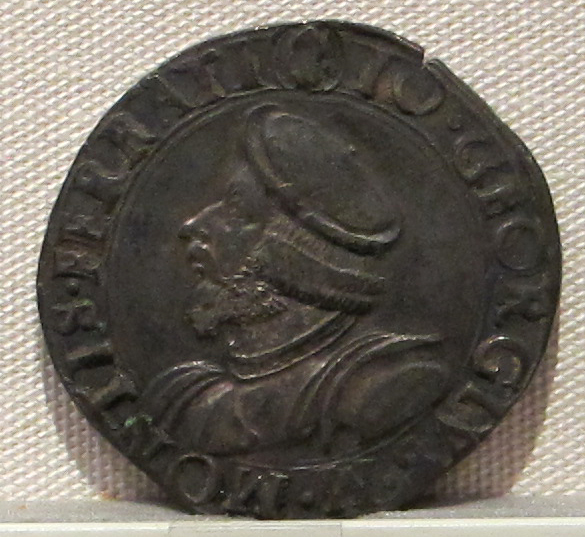
Coin issued in the 1530s by John George, a Palaiologos descendant through the Palaeologus-Montferrat branch; text introduces him as IO·GEORGIUS

The intermediate origin of Io is the Second Bulgarian Empire (1185–1396), located just south of early medieval territories which became Wallachia and Moldavia. As noted by historian A. D. Xenopol, it honors Ivan I Asen, in line with titles such as Caesar and Augustus. He also makes note of its standardized usage by later Asenids, as with the Gospels of Tsar Ivan Alexander (1355–1356). Xenopol sees the Asenid empire as partly Vlach, and therefore proto-Romanian, but rejects the claim that it ever ruled territories in either Moldavia or Wallachia. Slavist Ioan Bogdan similarly describes Io as borrowed from the Asenids "by diplomatic and paleographic means [...], first in documents, as an imitation of Bulgarian documents, then in other written monuments". The same Bogdan hypothesizes that the title was borrowed in a Moldo–Wallachian context as a posthumous homage to the first Asen rulers, while Nicolae Iorga sees it as a Vlach title which existed in both lands; archivist Damian P. Bogdan suggests a third option, namely that Io was originally a Medieval Greek title used in the Byzantine Empire—a contraction of Ἱωάννης, as used for instance by John II Komnenos and John V Palaiologos. This position is also taken by historian Ion Nistor, who believes that Ivan Asen left no document to attest his signature. Other scholars, beginning with Marin Tadin in 1977, argue that, though widely understood and vocalized as "John", Io was originally a misunderstanding replicated by Bulgarian and Wallachian scribes alike. They trace its origin to the Slavonic phrase въ I[мѧ] Ѡ[тъца]—"In the name of the Father".

During Moldavia and Wallachia's early history, the court language was Church Slavonic, using Early Cyrillic. Early adaptations of Io may date back to Wallachia's creation as an independent polity: as noted by Nistor, Basarab I was known in neighboring Serbia as Ivanko, and therefore "John". Numismatist Traian Bița endorsed this interpretation by noting that some period coinage, mysteriously minted by a Prince only known as IWAN, may be Basarab's own issue. Similarly, historian A. Stănilă argues that it was Basarab himself who adopted the title as an homage to the Asenids, which included his in-law Ivan Alexander. He also proposes that IO can be read as an acronym for the Renaissance Latin Iohannes Onores ("In honor of John").

The claim according to which Ivanko was the same as Basarab remains disputed by other scholars, who believe that it may refer to one of his descendants from the "House of Basarab"—either a poorly attested "John Basarab" (possibly Thocomerius) or Basarab's documented son and successor, Nicholas Alexander. Any explicit use of Io remains unattested until 1364, when it is included on Nicholas Alexander' epitaph, who (as Nistor notes) may have been directly inspired by the monogram of John Palaiologos. In the 1370s, Vladislav I began using Io in his signature—though never as an introductory formula on his edicts. He also minted coins with inscriptions in either Latin or Slavonic. Only the latter carry variants of Io—Ιω and Iωан; the Latin ones make no such provision. Under Vladislav's brother and successor Radu I, coins in Latin began featuring IONS as a translation of Ιω and contraction of Iohannes.

A trove of coins dating back to the rule of Mircea the Elder (1386–1394, 1397–1418) uses IWAN for IONS. Bița notes that these were found alongside coins only mentioning IWAN, and hypothesizes that they refer to Ivanko Dobrotitsa, the last man to ruler over the Dobrujan Despotate. The Despotate is generally assumed to have fallen to Mircea's invasion in 1411, with Ivanko being killed in the field of battle; Bița hypothesizes that this invasion ended with an understanding between Mircea and the Dobrujans, and that Ivanko may have survived as Mircea's co-ruler in the region. Mircea was also the first Wallachian to use Io in both his introductory formula and his signature, a practice also taken up by his son Michael I.

Mircea's enemy, Vlad I, who took the throne in 1396, was the first to use a Slavonic Io on Wallachia's Greater Seal version (featuring the Wallachian eagle or raven). Upon his return, Mircea added Slavonic Io on his Smaller Seal version—which, unusually, featured a lion rampant rather than the bird. The seal, used only once in 1411, reads †Iѡ Мирча Велики Воевода ("Io Mircea, Great Voivode"). With Latin still in high favor, a Slavonic Io was again added to the Greater Seal by Vladislav II in 1451. A version also appears in the Commentaries of Pope Pius II, which render Vlad the Impaler's 1462 letter to Mehmed the Conqueror in Latin translation. The Slavonic original, whereby Vlad places Wallachia under Ottoman vassalage, is presumed lost; in this surviving version, Vlad's name is omitted, possibly by mistake, and the text is left with "Io Voivode, Prince of Wallachia".

=== Spread ===
Io entered usage in Moldavia only after it became established in Wallachia. Moldavia's first coin series were all-Latin, and did not use any variant of Io, though it was attested by other documentary sources, including the full titles of Roman I. This historical record is also noted for including references to the Eastern Carpathians and the Black Sea, which various historians read as a clue that, by 1390, Moldavia had ended its expansion. Io also showed up in other texts of that era, as with the 1429 Gospels "from the time of our honorable and Christ-loving Prince Io Alexander Voivode". The same Alexander used the particle more rarely than his contemporaries, except on a stole which he donated to the monastery of Staraya Ladoga. Its embroidered text shows the Greek version of Io, additionally calling Alexander "Autokrator of Moldowallachia".

On various other documents, Io alternated with a Slavonic form of the royal we: Мꙑ. As noted by historian Ștefan S. Gorovei, Moldavia's Stephen the Great (reigned 1457–1504) introduced himself using both Ιω (or Iωан) and Мꙑ. The former is always present on stone-carved dedications made by Stephen, and on his version of the Greater Moldavian Seal, but much less so on the Smaller Seal. It also appears in the unusual reference to Stephen as Tsar (царъ) of Moldowallachia, as found on his illuminated Gospel at Humor Monastery (1473). Io on its own was present on Stephen's church bell at Bistrița Monastery; some reports suggest a similar Io-inscribed bell once existed at Neamț. On only three occasions, the two words were merged into Мꙑ Ιω or Мꙑ Iωан; one of these is a 1499 treaty which also carries the Latin translation, Nos Johannes Stephanus wayvoda. According to Gorovei, it is also technically possible that Stephen's Romanian name was vocalized by his boyars as Ioan Ștefan voievod, since the corresponding Slavonic formula appears in one document not issued by Stephen's own chancellery. A standalone Ιω was also used by Stephen's son and one-time co-ruler Alexandru "Sandrin", and appears as such on his princely villa in Bacău. It makes its first appearance on coins under Bogdan the Blind—who was Stephen's other son and his immediate successor.

The title Ιω could also appear in third-person references, as with church inscriptions and various documents. The 1507 Missal put out by Hieromonk Makarije, which is regarded as the first printed work in the history of Romania, features dedications to three Wallachian Princes, all of them introduced as Io: Vlad the Impaler, Radu the Great, and Mihnea the Evil. Another early example, also in Wallachia, is Neagoe Basarab's reference to himself and his alleged father, Basarab Țepeluș, named as Io Basarab cel Tânăr. This usage spread to his son and co-ruler Teodosie, who was otherwise not allowed to use a full regnal title. Neagoe would himself be referred to as Io Basarab in a 1633 document by his descendant, Matei Basarab, which unwittingly clarifies that Neagoe was not Țepeluș's son. In the 1530s, Io also appeared in ironic usage, in reference to Vlad Vintilă de la Slatina, who was known to his subjects as Io Braga voievod—referring to his penchant for drinking braga. Vlad Vintilă's reign is also noted for the attestation of Io in Modern Greek. This appears in a travel account by Antonios Karamalikis, an envoy of the Ecumenical Patriarchate, which honors κύρ βινδύλα Ίως ("Lord Vindyla Ios"); the latter word is a probable contraction of Ίωάννης, and as such an additional proof that Io was of Byzantine–Bulgarian origins.

While Io entered regular use, and was possibly a name implicitly used by all monarchs in Wallachia and Moldavia, derivatives of John only rarely made an appearance as an actual name. This means that the combination "Io John" was not present in early Romanian history. One exception was an unofficial reference to John Hunyadi, Regent-Governor of the neighboring Kingdom of Hungary in the 1450s. One of his Romanian subjects, the scribe Simeon of Hălmagiu, called him Io Iancu voievod. Only three reigning Princes, all of them Moldavian, took or kept derivatives of John as their primary names before the 17th century. The first two were Jacob "John" Heraclides, a foreign-born usurper; and John the Terrible, who was likely an illegitimate child, or an impostor. Both of them dropped the Io in front of their given name. A third, Iancu Sasul (identified in some sources as "Prince Iovan" or "Ioannis Iancula"), reigned in 1579–1582 without having any attested blood links to his predecessors. He did use the variant Io Iancul—probably because Iancu had not been fully identified as a derivative of "John". An illegitimate pretender, known as "Iohannes Iancula", was last attested living in exile in Västergötland in 1601.

Gorovei proposes the existence of a naming taboo for "Ioan" as a baptismal name, rather than as a title: "I came to the conclusion that princes avoided giving their sons, if born 'in the purple', the name of Ion (Ioan)." The usage of Io declined under Stephen the Great's other successors, down to Peter the Lame (reigned 1574–1574). These legitimate Stephanids only used it on their seals. The titles of Io and Tsar appear together in chronicler Macarie's reference to Prince Alexandru Lăpușneanu, penned in 1556. According to scholar Dimitrie Nastase, this is a direct borrowing from the Humor manuscript. However, as Nistor notes, by the time when boyar Ieremia Movilă took the Moldavian throne (1595–1600, 1600–1606), Io had declined into a mere "diplomatic formula", and was no longer read as the "attribute of legitimacy and sovereignty".

=== Transition ===
The 17th century witnessed a progressive adoption of Romanian as a court vernacular, using the localized Cyrillic alphabet. Early adaptations of Io in this new cultural context appear in the titles of Michael the Brave, who briefly accomplished his project to unite under one rule Wallachia, Moldavia, and the Principality of Transylvania. In one document of May 1600, he declared himself "Io Mihail [sic] Voivode, by the Grace of God Prince of Wallachia and of Transylvania and of Moldavia". In letters he addressed to his nominal liege Emperor Rudolf, he maintains the titles Io and Voivode (also preserved in German-language copies), but omits the other claims, and styles himself "humble servant of Your Highness". His feats of arms were locally celebrated in Muscel County, on Wallachia's border with Transylvania, with various local figures erecting wayside crosses that refer to their service under Michael. The text is in Slavonic rather than Romanian, and his name appears with a Slavonic iota on Io, as Їѡ Михаил and similar variants.

After Michael, another attempt to connect Io with rule over several countries was made by Vasile Lupu of Moldavia. In 1639, he used a seal which reunited the Wallachian and Moldavian arms, calling himself: "Io Vasilie Voievod, by the Grace of God Prince of the Moldavian and Wallachian Lands". Lupu's attempts at invading Wallachia inaugurated a period of unrest in the latter country, leading up to the uprisings led by Seimeni mercenaries. In 1655, these groups installed Hrizea of Bogdănei on the throne in Bucharest, causing the distressed boyars to demand support from Transylvania. Their letter of supplication uniquely addressed Transylvanian Prince George II Rákóczi with the Voivodal Io, also adapting his name into Racolțea. Mihnea III, who emerged as Prince in 1658, during the latter stages of this conflict, used Neo-Latin on his shillings, introducing him as IO MICHAEL RAD D CVL TR PR.

Neo-Latin variants continued to be featured on coins, as with 1660s Moldavian shillings issued by Eustratie Dabija, or IOHAN ISTRATDORVV; some also had the all-Latin rendition of Ιω as IO. At around the same time, Wallachia's Antonie Vodă was using Їѡ in his Slavonic title and Iѡ in his multilingual, autographed signature. Io was also found in during the reign of Constantin Cantemir (1685–1693), who stood out among Moldavian princes for being illiterate. In this version, the signature was a woodblock stamp. Slavonic versions were sometimes resumed and extended, with the Slavonic Io increasingly appearing with female members of the princely families. Possibly the earliest such examples, dated 1597–1600, are associated with Doamna Stanca, wife of Michael the Brave and mother of Nicolae Pătrașcu. Later examples include donations made by Elena Năsturel in 1645–1652. She signs her name as Ιω гспджа Елина зємли Влашкоє ("Io Princess Elina of Wallachia"). In the frescoes of Horezu Monastery, completed under Wallachia's Constantin Brâncoveanu, Io is used to describe not just the reigning Prince, but also his wife, Doamna Marica, his mother Stanca, and his late father, Papa Brâncoveanu, who never rose above regular boyardom. The latest appearance of the title alongside a princess is with Doamna Marica, who was also a niece of Antonie Vodă. Ιω is featured on her Slavonic seal of 1689, which she continued to use in 1717—that is, after Prince Constantin had been executed.

Brâncoveanu's downfall inaugurated Phanariote rules, with Princes who spoke Modern Greek, and in some cases Romanian, as their native language. One of the first Phanariotes, John I Mavrocordatos, apparently honored some aspects of tradition. According to Bița, this prince did not use Io in front of his title, although Їѡ Їѡaн and Иѡ Їѡaн appear on his 1717 deed to Plumbuita Monastery. In this new cultural context, Io (usually rendered as Їѡ) preceded statements or signatures in both Romanian and Slavonic, and became confounded with the Romanian first-person singular Eu—which can also be rendered as Io. In 1882, writer Alexandru Macedonski compared the Hurezu murals with the self-styling used by commoners, as in: Eu Gheorghĭe al Petriĭ ("I Gheorghe son of Petru"). On such bases, Macedonski denied that Io was ever a derivative of "John". Historian Petre Ș. Năsturel argues instead that there was a corruption, whereby Io came to be vocalized as a Romanian pronoun, and that this may explain why it was used by princesses. Năsturel points to this transition by invoking a 1631 signature by Lupul Coci (the future Vasile Lupu), "in plain Romanian but with Greek characters": Ιω Λουπουλ Μάρελε Βóρνιχ ("I Lupul the Great Vornic").

=== Later stages ===
Styles of Nicholas Mavrocordatos (with transliteration and modern equivalents) in a Slavonic writ issued at Iași on 20 May 1713

Nicholas Mavrocordatos, a Phanariote intellectual who held the throne of both countries at various intervals, also used Latin, in which he was known as Iohannes Nicolaus Alexandri Mavrocordato de Skarlati (1722) and Io Nicolai Maurocordati de Scarleti (1728). Romanian-language documents issued by this Prince, as well as by his competitor Mihai Racoviță, have Slavonic introductions, which include Ιω; to his Wallachian apologist Radu Popescu, Nicholas is known as Io Nicolae Alexandru voevod. All-Romanian titles were normalized under various other Phanariotes, as with Grigore II Ghica (Io Grigoriu Ghica) and Alexander Mourouzis (Io Alexandrul Costandin Muruz). Some noted variations were made by other Phanariotes. During his first reign in Wallachia, Alexander Ypsilantis modified the Wallachian arms to include his abbreviated title in Greek letters. Io appeared as IΩ, and twice—as the introductory particle, and as a rendition of Ypsilantis' middle name, Ιωάννης. In 1806, Moldavia's Scarlat Callimachi adopted the Romanian IѡанȢ as his introductory particle. As read by historian Sorin Iftimi, this should mean Io anume ("Io, that is", or "I namely"), rather than the name Ioanŭ.

The Phanariote era witnessed reigns by hospodars who were actually named "John", and for whom the Io particle could prove redundant. The first such case is with John II Mavrocordatos, who called himself Io Ioan in the 1740s, at a time when, as historian Petre P. Panaitescu writes, the memory of Io's origin had faded in Moldavia. Another early case was an anonymous manuscript in 1780s Moldavia, which retrospectively refers to a Io Ioan Grigore voievod. Wallachia's John Caradja (reigned 1812–1818) was known in his Romanian and Slavonic title as Io Ioan Gheorghe Caragea. In the 1820s, Ioan Sturdza, whose name also translates to "John", did not duplicate it with an introductory particle on various objects produced during his reign; a duplication can still be found on his 1825 frontispiece to Dimitrie Cantemir's Descriptio Moldaviae, which scholar Cătălina Opaschi reads as Ioanu Ioanu Sandul Sturza. Similarly, a handwritten Gospel by Hieromonk Ierinarh describes the Prince as Io Ioann Sandu Sturza.

The title became more obscure in the late 18th century. At that stage, a 1530s painting of Vlad Vintilă de la Slatina in the Great Lavra, at Mount Athos, was wrongly identified as, then retouched into, a portrait of John I Tzimiskes. The title Io, which survives from the original painting, was blended in with newer lettering for Tzimiskes' complete name. Iѡ as used by reigning hospodars was gradually replaced in the 18th and 19th centuries by Noi (or Нoi), a localized version of the royal we. The early Phanariote Constantine Mavrocordatos used both Io Costandin Nicolae in an all-Romanian text and Noi Costandin Nicolae in a part-Slavonic one. A 1783 writ by Alexander Mavrocordatos, regulating the governance of Moldavian Jews, uses both titles—Noi in its introduction, and Io in the princely signature. A variant with the exact spelling Noi appears on the Moldavian Seal used in 1849 by Grigore Alexandru Ghica. Alexandru Ioan Cuza, elected in 1859 as the first Domnitor to rule over both countries (the "United Principalities"), used a transitional mixture of Latin and Cyrillic (Нoi Alecsandru Joan 1.) on his Moldavian Seal. At that stage, some lexicographers viewed Io exclusively as a variant of eu—the pronoun appears as Io in an 1851 dictionary put out in Moldavia by Teodor Stamati. The title Io was also included on replicas of period objects. These include the churchbell at Trei Ierarhi, which was cast in 1832 as a copy, and referred to ktitor Vasile Lupu as Io Vasilie voievod.

During the 1860s and '70s, a period which resulted in the consolidation of union as the "Kingdom of Romania", the forgotten origins of Io became the object of scrutiny by historical linguists; this began in 1863 with an overview by Bogdan Petriceicu Hasdeu. Cuza was deposed by a "monstrous coalition" in early 1866, and Carol of Hohenzollern eventually took his place as Domnitor. In April of that year, Alexandru Papiu Ilarian, emphasizing the need to Romanianize this foreign arrival, proposed in Parliament that he be titled as Ioan Carol. In arguing for this, Papiu noted that Ioan was not a pronoun, and highlighted its origins with the Asenids—whom he called "Romanian kings over the Danube". While the proposal failed to garner support, the issue of etymology continued to attract attention. In 1934, Sextil Pușcariu's general dictionary listed Eu→Io as a popular etymology. The subtopic endures as "most debated and controversial". One fictionalized interpretation of the name and its origins was given in Valeriu Anania's 1973 play, Greul Pământului ("Weight of the Earth", or "Pregnancy with the Earth"), which links Io with the Caloian traditions, and both with a modern legend regarding Asenid founding-figure Ioannitsa Kaloyan.

== See also ==
- Stephen (honorific)
- Kings of Romania
