= Buicești =

Buiceşti may refer to several villages in Romania:

- Buiceşti, a village in Butoiești Commune, Mehedinţi County
- Buiceşti, a village in Priseaca Commune, Olt County
