= Rynda =

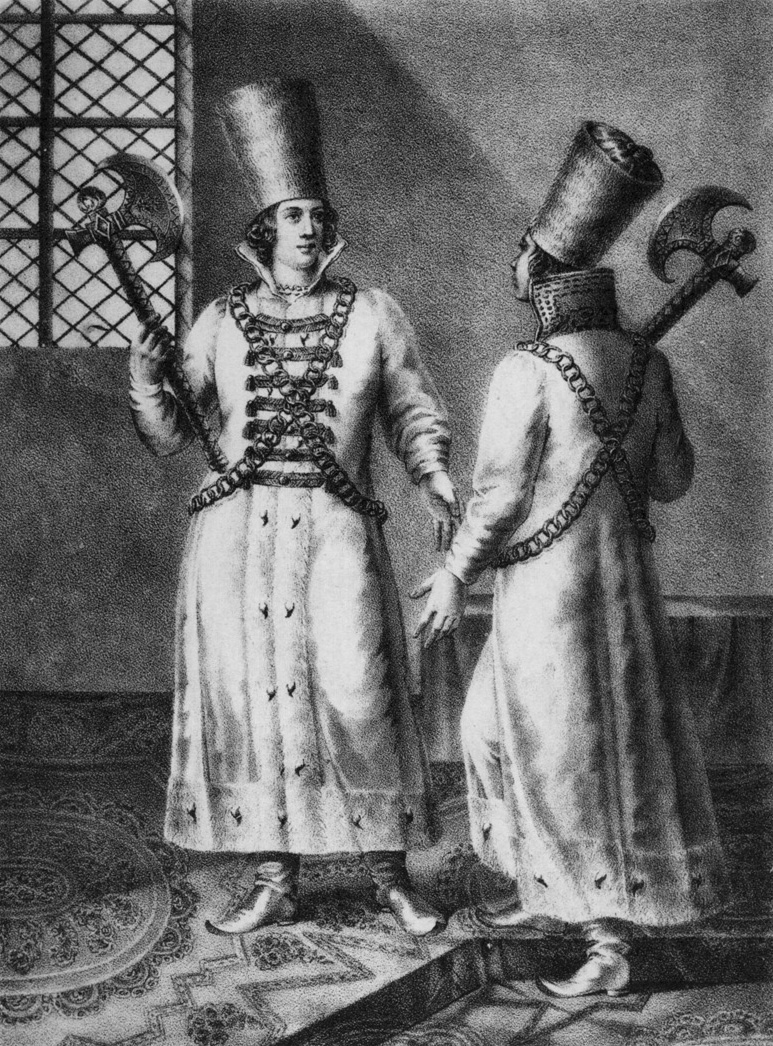
Depiction of two ryndy in the 16th and 17th centuries

A rynda (Russian: рында, pl. рынды, ryndy) was a bodyguard or squire of the Russian grand princes and tsars in the 16th and 17th centuries; the position was abolished by Peter I in 1698.

== History and appearance ==
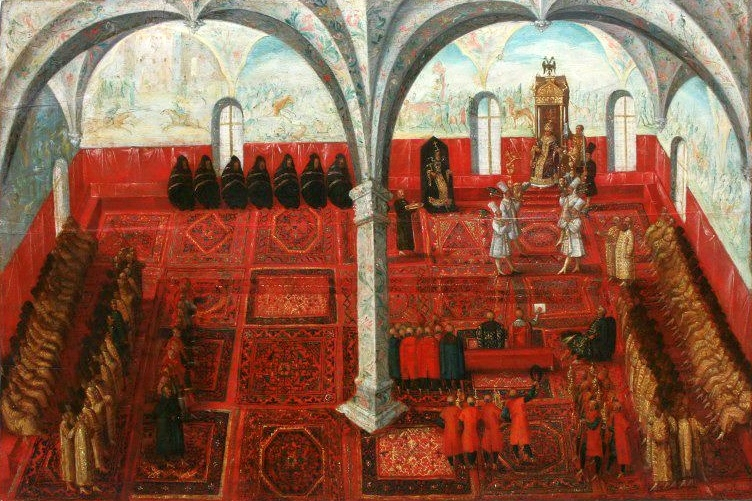
False Dmitry I holding court, surrounded by ryndy

The term rynda first appears in around 1380 and are mentioned to have been present at the Battle of Kulikovo, though did not exist as a unit it seems until the 16th century. Ryndy were selected from young men of noble origin. Ryndy acted as bodyguards to the Russian court and accompanied the tsar on journeys and diplomatic missions, and would carry his weapons and armour and accompany him into battle. They were not court officials and were not paid for their service, being accommodated in the royal household. The position was abolished by reforms of Peter the Great in 1698.

The ryndy wore white damask kaftans trimmed with ermine and embroidered with silver lacing, white boots and tall gorlatnayas made of white fox fur. Their status was indicated by silk and gold sashes worn around their waists and golden chains worn around the torso. Ryndy carried heavily decorated bardiches with gold and silver appliqués and bejewelled handles. Examples of these still exists in the Kremlin Armoury.

== In culture ==
A colloquial name of the ship's bell in Russian is "rynda". There are anecdotes about the origin of the term, including the following one. During the times of Peter the Great, Russian sailors were trained by foreign officers, and commands on a ship were uttered in English, in particular, the command "ring the bell!". As it happened with many foreign naval terms, to the Russian ear it transformed into "рынду бей!" (ryndu bey!), literally meaning "hit a rynda!".

== See also ==
- Spatharios
- Yeomen of the Guard
- Honourable Corps of Gentlemen at Arms

== Sources ==
- "Рынды" . Brockhaus and Efron Encyclopedic Dictionary (in Russian). 1906.
