= Herăști =

- Commune
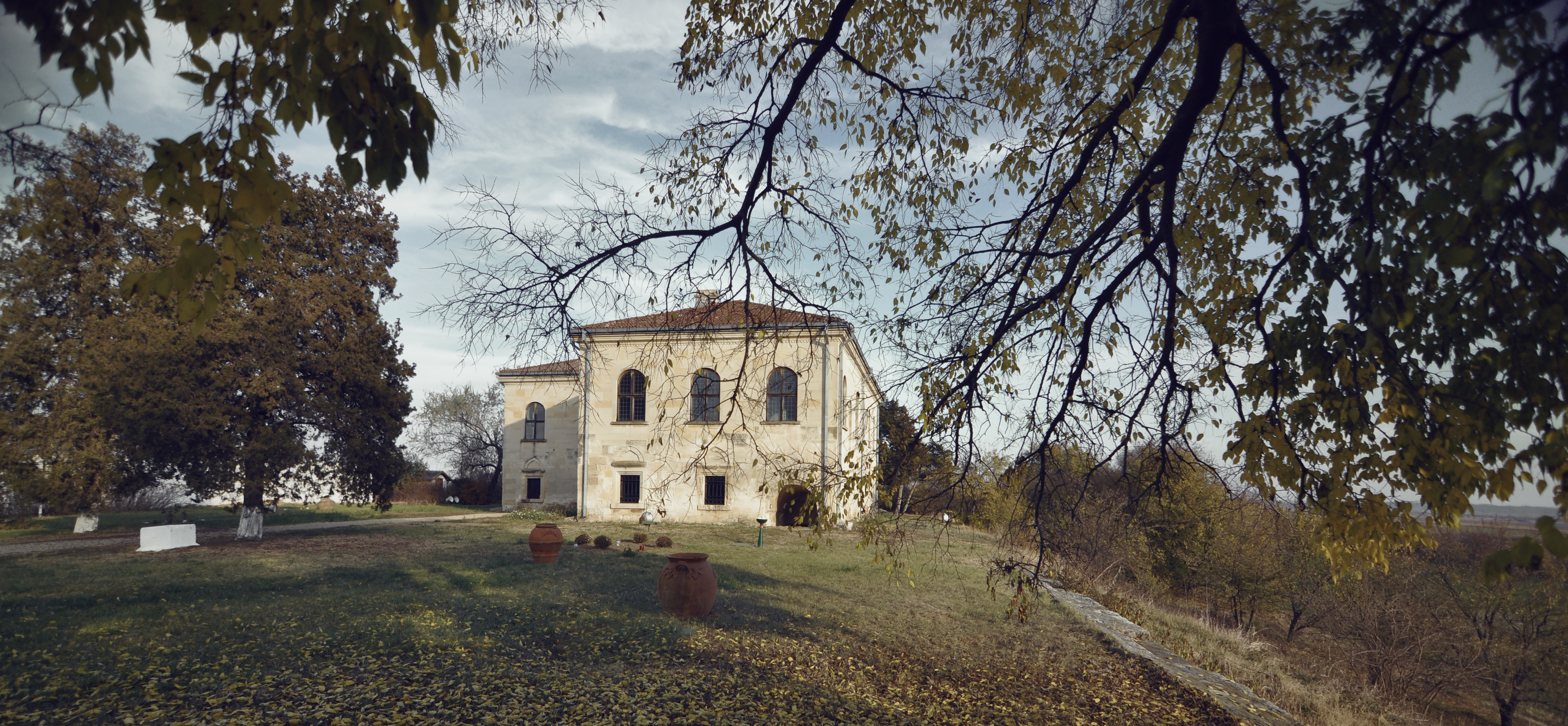
- Stone manor of Udriște Năsturel in Herăști village

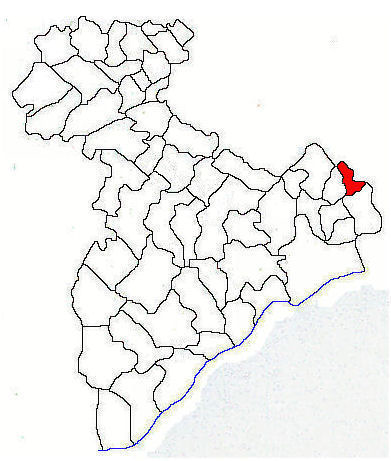
- Location in Giurgiu County

- Location in Romania
- Coordinates: 44.216°N 26.355°E
- Country: Romania
- County: Giurgiu

Government
  - Mayor (2020–2024): Ion Manolache (PNL)
- Area: 28.47 km^{2} (10.99 sq mi)
- Elevation: 44 m (144 ft)
- Population (2021-12-01): 2,223
  - Density: 78.08/km^{2} (202.2/sq mi)
- Time zone: UTC+02:00 (EET)
  - Summer (DST): UTC+03:00 (EEST)
- Postal code: 87126
- Area code: +(40) 246
- Vehicle reg.: GR
- Website: primariacomuneiherasti.ro

Herăști is a commune located in Giurgiu County, Muntenia, Romania. It is composed of two villages, Herăști and Miloșești. Until 2004, these were part of Hotarele Commune, when they were split off to form a separate commune.

The commune is located about 35 km (22 mi) southeast of downtown Bucharest via route DN4, at the border between Giurgiu County and Călărași County. On the southern border of the commune flows the Argeș River, from west to east.

According to the 2011 census, the commune had a population of 2,369; the majority of the inhabitants were Romanians (76.15%), with a minority of Roma (19.29%). At the 2021 census, Herăști had a population of 2,223; of those, 66.89% were Romanians and 24.47% Roma.

Historical population
Year	Pop.	±%
2002	2,398	—
2011	2,369	−1.2%
2021	2,223	−6.2%
Source: Census data

== Natives ==
- Paula Ivan (born 1963), middle-distance runner
- Udriște Năsturel (1596 or 1598–c. 1658), Wallachian scholar, poet, and statesman
