= Priseaca =

- Commune
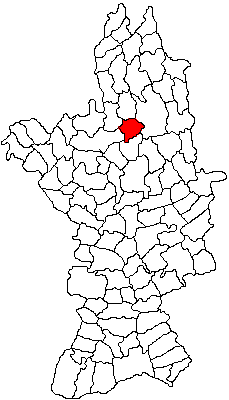
- Location in Olt County

- Location in Romania
- Coordinates: 44°30′N 24°26′E
- Country: Romania
- County: Olt
- Population (2021-12-01): 1,291
- Time zone: EET/EEST (UTC+2/+3)
- Vehicle reg.: OT

Priseaca is a commune in Olt County, Muntenia, Romania. It is composed of three villages: Buicești, Priseaca, and Săltănești.

== Natives ==
- Diicul Buicescul
