= Verguleasa =

- Commune
- Seal

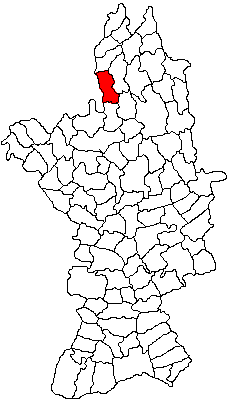
- Location in Olt County

- Location in Romania
- Coordinates: 44°39′N 24°19′E
- Country: Romania
- County: Olt
- Population (2021-12-01): 2,836
- Time zone: UTC+02:00 (EET)
  - Summer (DST): UTC+03:00 (EEST)
- Vehicle reg.: OT

Verguleasa is a commune in Olt County, Muntenia, Romania. It is composed of seven villages: Căzănești, Cucueți, Dumitrești, Poganu, Valea Fetei, Vânești and Verguleasa.
