= Elena Năsturel =

Romanian princess consort

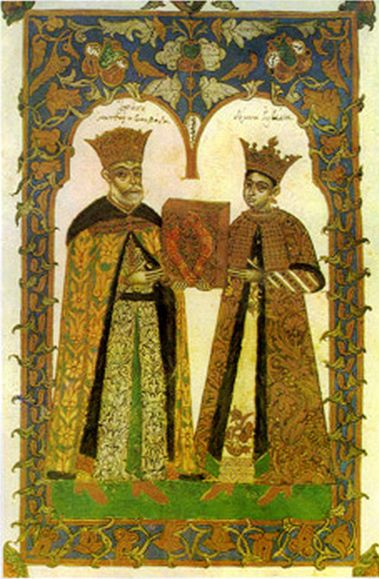
- Matei Basarab and his wife (right) depicted in the book printed during his rule

Princess Consort of Wallachia
- Reign: 1632–1653
- Predecessor: Stanca Brâncovean
- Born: 1598
- Died: 1653
- Burial: The Royal Church of Târgoviște
- Spouse: Matei Basarab
- Issue: Matei
- Father: Radu Năsturel
- Mother: Despina Calea Calomfirescu

Doamna Elena (1598–1653) was a princess consort of Wallachia by marriage to Prince Matei Basarab. The sister of scholar Udriște Năsturel, she was known for her cultural patronage and introduced the first printing press in Wallachia. She was born to the Seneschal Radu Năsturel from Herăști and Calea Calomfirescu, who herself, was descended from Michael the Brave.

She and her husband only had one son Matei, who died young. In his memory, she adopted her nephew, the son of Udriște, whose wife died shortly after giving birth to their son, who was named Mateiaș and raised him as her own. He was considered heir to the throne, but he died at the age of 17. When she died of a heart attack in 1653, she was buried next to Mateiaș in the Royal Church of Târgoviște. The following year when her husband died, he too was buried next to her. Per her husband's request, her tombstone was inscribed with the phrase "they lived together twice 20 years each".
