= Battle of Finta =

Battle in 1653 between Wallachia and Moldavia near Finta, Romania

- Part of the Moldavian campaign of Tymofiy Khmelnytsky
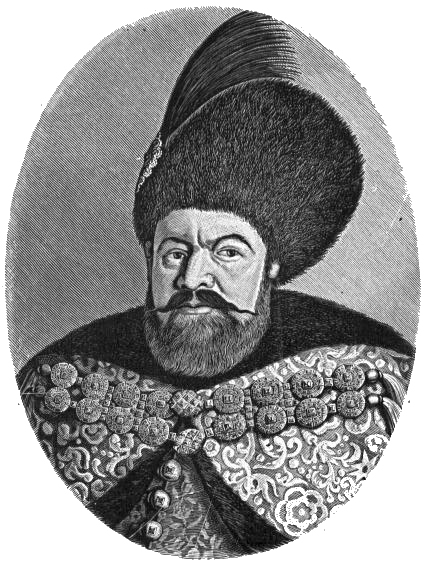
- Vasile Lupu (ruled 1634–1653).
Date	27 May 1653
Location	Finta 44°47′25″N 25°49′17″E
Result	Wallachian victory

Belligerents
Wallachia; Polish–Lithuanian Commonwealth; Seimeni Serb mercenaries Hungarian mercenaries	Moldavia; Cossack Hetmanate; Tatars; German and Austrian mercenaries

Commanders and leaders
(Wallachia) Matei Basarab; Gheorghe Ștefan; Diicul Buicescul	(Moldavia) Vasile Lupu; Tymofiy Khmelnytsky

Strength
20–30,000 Wallachians, 5,000 allies	4,000 Moldavians, 15,000 Cossacks, 2,000 Tatars, 100 Germans

Casualties and losses
1,000 Wallachians, 200 Poles and Lithuanians, 100 Serbs, 80 Hungarians	3,000 Moldavians, 7,000 Cossacks, 1,000 Tatars, all Germans and Austrians killed, the rest captured

The Battle of Finta (27 May 1653) was a confrontation between Prince Matei Basarab's Wallachian army and a combined Moldavian–Cossack–Tatar force under Prince Vasile Lupu and Tymofiy Khmelnytsky. It took place around Finta, now a commune in Dâmbovița County, Romania.

The battle began by an attack of Moldavian infantry and Tatar–Cossack cavalrymen. From the beginning, the Moldavians, Tatars and Cossacks were driven back by the Wallachian military forces and Lithuanian defenders. Subsequently, both armies advanced to meet in a marshland, where a great melee began. Wallachians, Polish-Lithuanians, Seimeni Serb and Hungarian mercenaries destroyed the entire force of Cossacks and Tatars, with their swords and bayonets; the Moldavians, alongside the German and Austrian mercenaries, retreated a kilometer to prepare for the attacks. They resisted a series of attacks by the Wallachian-led combined troops, until finally the Wallachians bombarded their positions. The German and Austrian mercenaries were all killed during the bombardment. 1,000 Moldavians, 4,000 Cossacks and 1,000 Tatars were taken as prisoners, and mistreated by Wallachians. Almost half of them perished in captivity or were sold as slaves, including Ecaterina Cercheza, the wife of Vasile Lupu.

The battle was a Wallachian decisive victory, resulting in the ousting of the Moldavian Prince and his replacement with Gheorghe Ștefan. There was a brief Wallachian occupation of Iași, and a siege of Suceava (where Tymofiy was killed).
