= Clucer =

Historical rank held by boyars in Moldavia and Wallachia

Clucer (Romanian pronunciation: [kluˈt͡ʃer]; plural cluceri) was a historical rank traditionally held by boyars in Moldavia and Wallachia, roughly corresponding to that of Masters of the Royal Court. It originated in the Slavic kliučiari (from the word for "key"), being equivalent to the Russian title of klyuchnik.

Cluceri were in charge of supplying the courts of Moldavian or Wallachian Princes with food and other objects of necessity; the clucer de arie oversaw the supply in cereals and fodder, while the clucer de pivniță and clucer de jigniță organized, respectively, the supply in beverages and food for the military forces. In time, the title became purely symbolic, and faded out of use during the 19th century.
