= Constantin Șerban =

Prince of Wallachia from 1654 to 1658

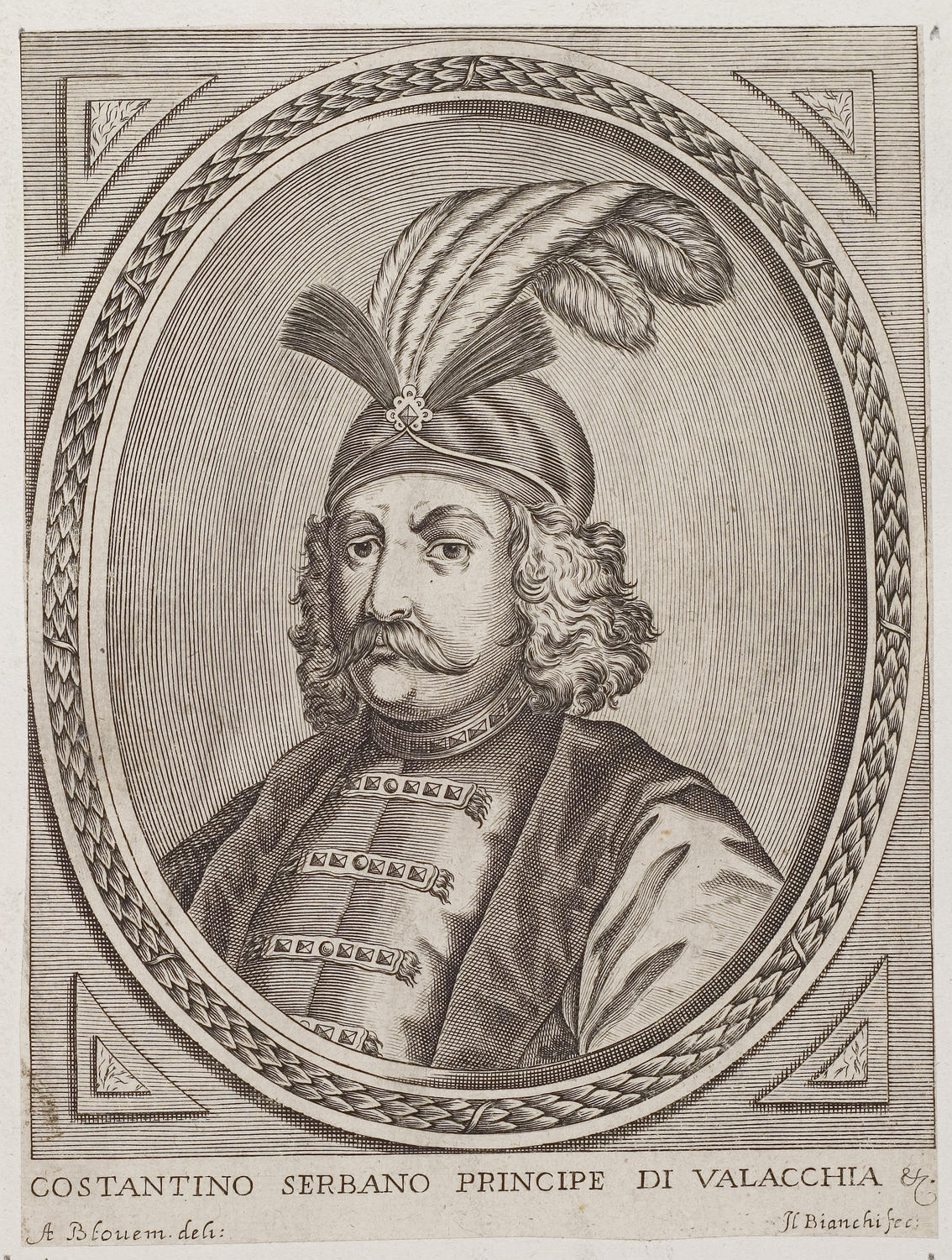
- 17th-century portrait

Prince of Wallachia
- Reign: 19 April 1654 – 26 January 1658
- Predecessor: Matei Basarab
- Successor: Mihnea III

Prince of Moldavia (1st reign)
- Reign: November 1659
- Predecessor: George Ghica
- Successor: Ștefăniță Lupu

Prince of Moldavia (2nd reign)
- Reign: 31 January – February 1661
- Predecessor: Ștefăniță Lupu
- Successor: Ștefăniță Lupu
- Died: 1682
- House: Basarab
- Father: Radu Șerban
- Religion: Orthodox

Constantin II Șerban (died 1682) was the prince of Wallachia from 1654 to 1658. He was an illegitimate son of Radu Şerban. According to custom, being born out of wedlock did not disqualify Constantin from becoming prince.

== Reign ==
He was an illegitimate son of Radu Şerban. His rule saw the rebellion of the seimeni mercenaries (1655). In order to deal with the issue, Constantin Şerban allied himself with the Transylvanian Prince George II Rákóczi, including himself in the latter's plans for emancipation from Ottoman rule.

In 1657, the Porte deposed him; Constantin Şerban went on to fight alongside Rákóczi, managing to upset Ottoman presence in Moldavia and briefly occupying the throne in Iaşi, at two different moments (in 1659 and 1661). Paul of Aleppo documents the derelict state of Wallachia during the Ottoman intervention, including an account of the rural population fleeing for the Transylvanian Alps ("where the Wallachians were accustomed to take refuge in time of need").

In 1656, the Prince ordered the building of the Bucharest Metropolitan Cathedral (today: Patriarchal), partly modeled on the Curtea de Argeş Monastery – but larger and more austere. In his honour, the church was given the patronage of Eastern Orthodox Saints Constantine (his namesake) and Helena. In 1658, he set fire to the city, trying to prevent his adversary Mihnea III from making use of its facilities.

Preceded by Matei Basarab	Prince of Wallachia; 1654–1658	Succeeded by Mihnea III

Preceded by Gheorghe I Ghica	Prince/Voivode of Moldavia; 1659	Succeeded by Ştefăniţă Lupu
Preceded by Ştefăniţă Lupu	Prince/Voivode of Moldavia; 1661	Succeeded by Ştefăniţă Lupu
