= Mihnea III =

Prince of Wallachia from 1658 to 1659

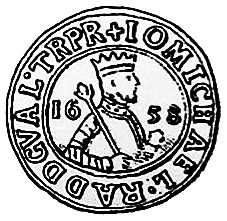

Prince of Wallachia
- Reign: 5 March 1658 – November 1659
- Predecessor: Constantin Șerban
- Successor: George Ghica
- Born: 1613; Iaşi
- Died: 5 April 1660 (aged 46–47); Sătmar
- Father: Radu Mihnea (alleged, see § Ancestry claims)
- Religion: Orthodox

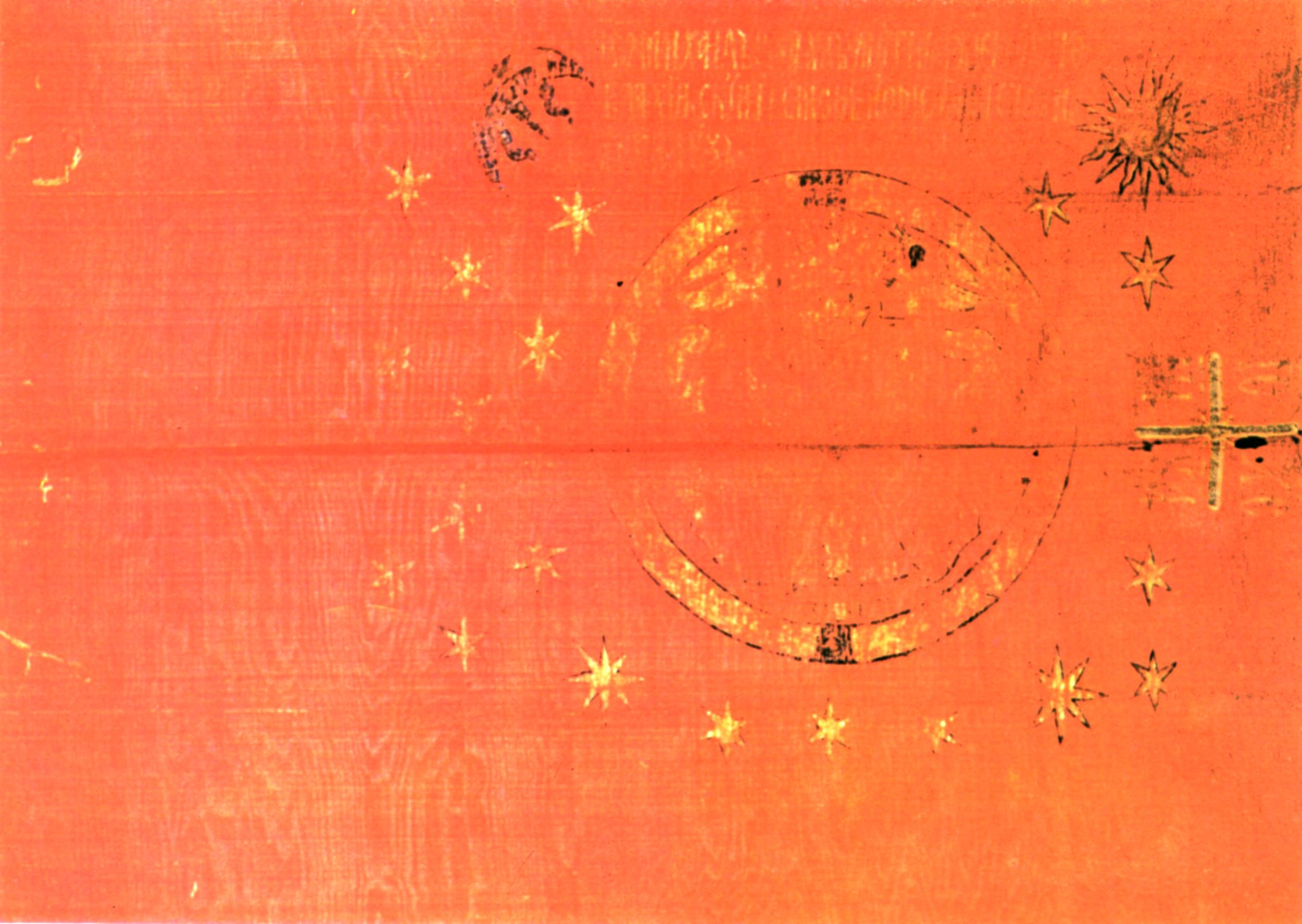
Mihnea III person flag used during his reign. Today the flag is found in the National Museum of Belgrade and albeit the cloth is well preserved, the golden painting has almost vanished.

Mihnea III Radu (Ottoman Turkish: Ğivan bey; 1613 – 5 April 1660) was the prince of Wallachia from March 1658 to November 1659. His father was alleged to have been the voivode Radu Mihnea.

== Family ==
=== Ancestry claims ===
Radu's ancestry is uncertain. During his life, Radu claimed to be the son of Radu Mihnea, but other versions of his history give different accounts of his ancestry, such as claiming his true father was Radu Șerban or Mircea Ciobanu. Pârvu Cantacuzino claims that "Mihnea was originally a Greek money-lender. His father was called Iane the Deaf (Rom. “Surdul”), and he himself was baptized Franți. Thus, showing from a young age a propensity to follow Ishmael, Hagar's son, he ran away from his parents, went to Țarigrad, and bowed in allegiance to Kinan-pașa, telling him that he was the son of Radu-voivode and the grandson of Mihnea-voivode. And thus he spent his life with the Turks, around 40 years".

== Biography ==
=== Early life ===
According to a Turkish traveller, Mihnea was raised in the Greek community of Istanbul. He was a good friend of Grand Vizier Kenan Pasha and his wife Atike Sultan, and his status was reportedly comparable to that of an adopted son.

=== Rise to power ===
In July 1653, Mihnea was probably behind an assassination attempt on Matei Basarab's life.

On 29 January 1658, Mihnea swore allegiance to Ottoman Sultan Mehmed IV.

A little over a month later, Ottoman troops invaded Wallachia and overthrew then-voivode Constantin Șerban, installing the more compliant Radu in his place on 5 March 1658.

== Anti-Ottoman struggle ==
Coordinating his actions with those of the Prince of Transylvania, George II Rákóczi, Mihnea launched military operations against the Turks in 1659. After securing a few victories south of the Danube and in Dobrudja, alongside winning a battle at Frăteşti on 23 November, he was ultimately forced to retreat to Transylvania by the end of the year, having been attacked from the rear by the Tatars and facing opposition from the entire boyar class.

=== Death ===
Mihnea most likely died on April 5, 1660, the day after attending a banquet in Sătmar hosted by Constantin Șerban.

== Bibliography ==
- Börekçi, Günhan (2009). Ágoston, Gábor; Bruce Masters (eds.). Encyclopedia of the Ottoman Empire.
- Diaconovich, Corneliu (1904) [1896]. Enciclopedia română (in Romanian). Vol. 3. W. Krafft.
- Feodorov, Ioana (January 2014). Mihnea III Radu, Prince of Wallachia, as Seen by Paul of Aleppo and His Father Makāriyūs Ibn al-Zaʻīm, Patriarch of Antioch.
- Secuiu, Micu (14 September 2016). Studii de istorie - ed. a II-a (in Romanian and German). Zekely Wilhelm. ISBN 9786068796031.
- Xenopol, Alexandru Dimitrie (1896). Istoria romãinilor din Dacia traiana (in Romanian).
- Popescu, Marin Matei; Beldeanu, Adrian N. (1982). Mihnea al III-lea: 1658-1659 (in Romanian). Editura Militară, 1982. https://dn721802.ca.archive.org/0/items/popescu-marin-matei-beldeanu-adrian-n.-mihnea-al-iii-lea-ctrl_202512/Popescu%2C%20Marin%20Matei%20%26%20Beldeanu%2C%20Adrian%20N.%20-%20Mihnea%20al%20III-lea%20-%20ctrl.pdf
- Pop, Ioan-Aurel; Bolovan, Ioan (2021). Marea Istorie Ilustrată a Românilor. Ediție revizuită și actualizată (in Romanian). Editura Litera.
