= Paul of Aleppo =

Ottoman clergyman and chronicler (1627–1669)

Paul Za'im of Aleppo
- Born: 1627; Aleppo, Ottoman Syria
- Died: January 30, 1669 (aged 41–42); Tiflis, Georgia
- Church: Greek Orthodox Patriarchate of Antioch
- Writings: The Travels of Macarius, Patriarch of Antioch
- Title: Archdeacon

Paul Za'im, known sometime also as Paul of Aleppo (1627 – 30 January 1669), was an Ottoman Syrian Orthodox clergyman, chronicler, and Archdeacon of Aleppo. Son of Patriarch Macarius III Ibn al-Za'im, Paul accompanied his father in his travels throughout Constantinople, Wallachia, Moldavia, Ukraine, and Russia, as an attempt to raise funds and support for their Church (from 1652 to 1659, and from 1666 to 1669).

== Life and works ==
He was born in 1627 in Aleppo, the same year his mother died. He was appointed a reader on May 8, 1642. On February 17, 1644, he married, and on November 21, 1647, he was ordained archdeacon. He died in Tiflis, Georgia on January 30, 1669.

Paul wrote down an account of his visits, The Travels of Macarius, Patriarch of Antioch (edited in Arabic). It is important as a source on Wallachia, documenting the main events of Constantin Şerban's rule and the Ottoman expedition of 1657. In that work Paul also talks about the Cossack Country under the "reign of the Khatman Zenobius Akhmil" (Hetman Bohdan-Zynoviy Khmelnytsky).

He wrote also a History of the Patriarchs of Antioch.

== Sources ==
- "Павел Алеппский" . Brockhaus and Efron Encyclopedic Dictionary (in Russian). 1906.
