= Seimeni =

Seimeni (plural of Seimen) designates the group of flintlock-armed infantry mercenaries charged with guarding the hospodar (ruler) and his court in 17th and 18th century Wallachia and Moldavia. They were mostly of Serb and other Balkan origin. The term is of Turkish origin: seğmen means "young armed man", it itself derives from Persian سگبان (sagbān). In modern transcriptions of Slavonic, it may also appear as simén (plural: siméni) or siimén (siiméni).

Menaced by the growing privileges of boyars and threatened to lose land grants or be turned into serfs, the Wallachian seimeni rebelled in 1655, being crushed after Prince Constantin Șerban enlisted the help of George II Rákóczi, Prince of Transylvania, as well as that of Moldavia's Voivode Gheorghe Ștefan. After exercising a rule of terror in Bucharest, capturing and executing several boyars, they were decisively defeated by Rákóczi on June 26, 1655, in a battle on the Teleajen River.

== See also ==
- Serbs in Romania
- Sejmeni (Seimeni), a song from the album Bolero by the Croatian ex-Yu band Haustor

== Literature ==
- Gheorghe I. Brătianu, Sfatul domnesc și Adunarea Stărilor in Principatele Române, Bucharest, 1995
- Constantin C. Giurescu, Istoria Bucureștilor. Din cele mai vechi timpuri pînă în zilele noastre, Bucharest, 1966, p. 73
