= Pârvu Cantacuzino =

Wallachian statesman and rebel (d. 1769)

Pârvu III Cantacuzino
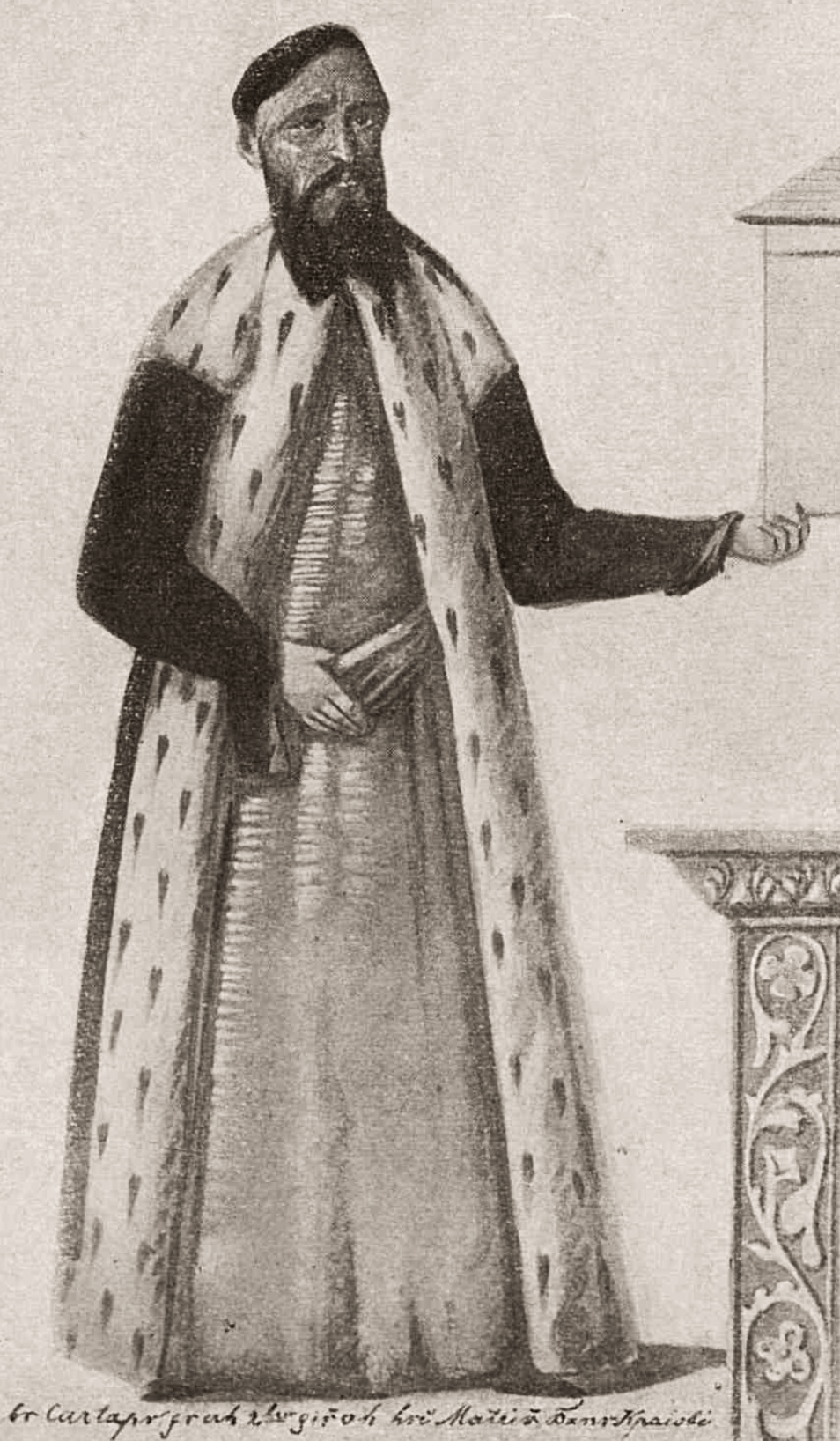
- Pârvu Cantacuzino in a copy of a votive mural from an unspecified church (original dated to c. 1741)

Civilian Governor of Wallachia
- In office c. November 17 – c. December 11, 1769

Personal details
- Born: c. 1710
- Died: December 1769 (aged 54–59) Comana, Wallachia
- Resting place: Comana Monastery
- Spouse(s): Maria Palade (to 1741); Elena (Eleni) Hrisoscoleu; Smaranda (Esmeralda) Palade
- Relations: Drăghici Cantacuzino (great-grandfather); Mareș Băjescu (great-grandfather); Răducanu Cantacuzino (brother); Ioan Cantacuzino (nephew)
- Parents: Matei Cantacuzino (father); Păuna (Pagona) Rustea (mother)

Military service
- Allegiance: Wallachia; Russian Empire
- Years of service: c. 1737–December 1769
- Rank: Ban or Spatharios
- Commands: Wallachian military forces
- Battles/wars: Russo-Turkish War (1735–1739); Russo-Turkish War (1768–1774)

Pârvu III Cantacuzino, also known as Pârvul, Părvul, Purvul or Pîrvu Cantacuzino (Romanian Cyrillic: Първȣ Кантакȣзинȣ or Кантакȣзинo; Russian: Пырву Матвеевич Кантакузино, Pyrvu Matveyevich Kantakuzino; c. 1710 – December 1769), was a high-ranking Wallachian statesman who served intermittently as Spatharios and Ban of Oltenia, primarily known as the leader of an anti-Ottoman rebellion. Holding sway over a Russophile faction within the Wallachian boyardom, he briefly served as an officer in Russia's Imperial Army during the Russo-Turkish War of 1768-1774. Pârvu was a member of the Cantacuzino family, which made him a descendant of several Wallachian Princes, and was joined in all of his political and military actions by his younger brothers, the Vistier Mihai and Clucer Răducanu Cantacuzino.

Exiled by Prince Matei Ghica in the early 1750s, Pârvu and Mihai became known for their protests against the abuses of Phanariote rulers and their retinue. They experienced success, then imprisonment, under Constantin Racoviță, and became highly popular for resisting the tax policies of Ștefan Racoviță. Helping Pyotr Rumyantsev and Nazary Alexandrovych Karazin in their occupation of Bucharest, the Cantacuzinos also arrested Grigore III Ghica; in the aftermath, Pârvu served as civilian governor of Wallachia. He commanded a part of the Wallachian military forces, which he reorganized around voluntary units, whose officers included Sofronie of Cioara; at least one contemporary source mentions that these were ragtag units, with a level of unpreparedness that astonished Karazin.

Assisting against the Ottoman army on the road to Giurgiu, Pârvu and his Jäger infantry were ambushed and killed on the way to Comana Monastery, which became their burial place. Remembered as a tragic hero and passionate nationalist in contemporary chronicles, he may also have contributed to the Cantacuzinos' role in Romanian culture as the uncredited author of a historical chronicle that was plagiarized by Naum Râmniceanu. His family branch, headed by Mihai, survived mostly in exile, joining the ranks of Russian nobility and calling for Wallachia's annexation to Russia. It included Pârvu's nephew Ioan Cantacuzino, the poet and politician, who returned for a while to take over as leader of the Russophile faction. The Russophiles maintained a presence in Wallachian politics to c. 1800, but frictions between the Empire and the boyars pushed the party a steady decline.

== Biography ==
=== Origins and rise ===
The Cantacuzinos were a family of Greek refugees, though probably related, through their patriarch Andronikos Kantakouzenos, with the local late-16th-century Prince, Michael the Brave. Their exact relationship with the original Kantakouzenos, from whom they claimed descent, remains disputed. Pârvu and Mihai descended directly from Drăghici Cantacuzino, brother of Șerban Cantacuzino, who was Prince in the 1680s, and of the scholar-politician Constantin II. Drăghici, his brother Șerban, and their father, Constantin I Cantacuzino had been involved in various schemes during the 1650s and '60s, culminating in open conflict with Prince Grigore I Ghica. The latter ordered Constantin I hanged at Snagov Monastery, and mutilated Șerban. This prompted Drăghici to take refuge in Istanbul. He died there in 1667, either from the plague outbreak or (as it was rumored) from poison administered by the boyar Nicula Sofialiul. Through this connection, Pârvu was also a maternal descendant of Prince Radu Șerban and of the high-ranking courtier Diicul Buicescul.

Pârvu hailed from the "Măgureanu" Cantacuzinos, whose origin is traced to one of Drăghici's sons, also named Pârvu (or Pârvu II). This prominent boyar and diplomat under several Princes married Ilinca, daughter of Mareș Băjescu, the Ban of Oltenia. The couple's youngest son, Matei, also served as Ban from 1735. He fell ill in 1740, while overseeing works on the border with the Habsburg monarchy at the Cerna, and died before the year's end. From his marriage to the boyaress Păuna (Pagona) Rustea, he had a daughter, Maria, and four sons, of whom Pârvu III was second. Constantin, the eldest, left for Moldavia in 1733, establishing a Cantacuzino branch there before his death in 1761. Remaining in Wallachia, Pârvu, Mihai and their youngest brother, Răducanu, went on to occupy high offices of the court.

The Cantacuzino brothers' political ascendancy came at the height of a Phanariote regime, when Princes were directly appointed by, and subservient to, the Sublime Porte—deepening the Ottoman vassalage that Wallachia and Moldavia had accepted in the previous centuries. According to historian Neagu Djuvara, the Cantacuzinos were technically Phanariotes, but emphasized their matrilineal connection to the House of Basarab. As such, they "would soon come to lead a 'national party', one hostile to the growing influence of the Greeks". Architect and genealogist Dan D. Ionescu suggests that Pârvu III's birth year was anywhere between 1710 and 1715, which also coincides with the debut of Phanariote rules. His first contribution to the Wallachian military forces came during Constantine Mavrocordatos' third reign (1735–1741). He was ordered to take up arms during the 1737 campaign against Russia; in fact, the army's role was to intervene between the Bucharest populace and the Ottoman army, policing against pillage and rape.

This period inaugurated Pârvu's participation in Russophile politics and intrigues. Appointed Serdar in April 1737, he signed his name to Vornic Preda Drăgănescu's memorandum which requested from Anna Ioannovna, Empress of All Russia, pleading with her to "liberate us [...] by any means". From June, the Habsburg monarchy joined the war as a Russian ally, and invaded Wallachia, prompting the Prince and boyars into exile; several of those still present in Bucharest were arrested by Habsburg General Barkóczy, and deported into Transylvania. Pârvu and his father were among those who signed a letter of protest to the Russians, asking them to curb their allies' abuses. The document was successfully delivered by Dimitrie Scutari at Kiev—along with another memorandum which asked for Wallachia to be made a Russian protectorate.

=== Fluctuating Phanariote alliances ===
At the height of the war, in July 1737, Pârvu donated pastures on his estate at Zamura to be used perpetually by Sinaia Monastery. He soon after married for a first time—to Maria, daughter of a Moldavian boyar, Andronic Palade. The wedding took place on October 28, 1739, in the church outside Curtea Veche, with Prince Mavrocordatos appearing as Pârvu's godfather. Maria died shortly after, in or before 1741. The widower was favored during Mavrocordatos' fourth reign, in 1744–1748, when, alongside the Phanariote Ștefanachi Cremidi and a number of local boyars, he began a lucrative activity in collecting the tax on sheep. All of them were persecuted for this activity after 1748, when Grigore II Ghica was sent in as the new Prince; Pârvu was reportedly preparing a letter of protest to be read by Sultan Mahmud I, just as Ghica suddenly died in August 1752. Matei Ghica took the throne before the end of the year, forcing Pârvu and Mihai into exile to Moldavia for almost a year. By 1759, Pârvu had married Elena (or Eleni) Hrisoscoleu, making him in-laws with Serdar Canache.

Moving from Moldavia to Wallachia in 1753, Prince Constantin Racoviță took the Cantacuzino brothers with him to Bucharest. He reinstated Pârvu as a Paharnic in 1753, also advancing Mihai (married into the Văcărescu family) as his trusted treasurer, or Vistier. By 1761, with Mavrocordatos again on the throne, Pârvu was serving as the highest-ranking Logothete. In October of that year, he and his relative, the Medelnicer Toma Cantacuzino, exchanged property in Bucharest, making Pârvu owner of the "parental homes" in Șerban-Vodă mahala—located outside Lipscani, and named after their shared ancestor, the Prince Șerban. This acquisition included Șerban's wooden chapel, which Pârvu rebuilt out of brick, and which went as dowry to his daughter Maria. Mihai Cantacuzino was also an amateur historian, and there is indication that Pârvu also authored at least one work in the field. Scholars have deduced the existence of Istoria Țării Românești ("History of Wallachia") as a manuscript dating back to 1763, and have attributed it to Pârvu.

Racoviță returned on the throne in 1763, by which time the brothers had a running feud with Iordachi Stavrachi, who was Constantin Racoviță's representative to the Sublime Porte. As a result of his intrigues, both Mihai and Pârvu were imprisoned in Bucharest, but simply released by the Bucharest populace upon the Prince's death in January 1764. The throne went to Constantin's brother Ștefan Racoviță. As a show of his munificence, he welcomed both Pârvu and Mihai in Istanbul, where the two assured him that they would help him increase fiscal revenues; in exchange for this pledge, they obtained that Stavrachi be hanged. Mihai could return as Vistier under this reign, which covered 1764–1765, but only after proving himself capable of increasing the fiscal revenue by some 7,200 bags of gold. He was again imprisoned, alongside nine other boyars, when he refused to apply the dreaded tax on chimneys. This abuse caused another burghers' revolt in Bucharest, prompting Sultan Mustafa III to intervene; Prince Ștefan hurried to release Mihai and the others, but was still garrotted for his insubordination.

Even before he could take his throne as Racoviță's replacement, Scarlat Ghica made Pârvu his Logothete, reconfirming Mihai as Vistier. Under his successor Alexandru Ghica, Pârvu went on to serve command offices in the military, as Oltenian Ban, and was also curator of Pantelimon Hospital, alongside Badea Știrbei. In 1767, he married a third and final time to another Palade boyaress, Smaranda (or Esmeralda), who was also the granddaughter of Moldavian Prince Antioh Cantemir. Răducanu, meanwhile, served as a Clucer, marrying Caterina, daughter of John Mavrocordatos.

=== Revolt ===
The Cantacuzinos' role in fomenting insurrection was more evident once Grigore III Ghica took the throne in 1768. In that context, they protected monk Sofronie of Cioara, who had led the peasants of neighboring Transylvania in their revolt against serfdom and Greek Catholicism. With Pârvu's support, Sofronie began recruiting Transylvanians, Wallachians and Moldavians, preparing his return into the Apuseni Mountains. Shortly before the Russo-Turkish War began in October 1768, Pârvu and his brother formed a group of pro-Russian boyars in Bucharest. Their connection with the Russians was a Polkovnik Nazary Alexandrovych Karazin (father of Vasyl Karazin). Karazin, who feigned illness and was hospitalized at Argeș Monastery, handed manifestos to the brothers, which they were to distribute in Wallachia and the Sanjak of Smederevo. Another immediate task was to channel a constant flow of Wallachian volunteers to enforce the Russian flank from incursions by the Budjak Horde and Silistra Eyalet. In January 1769, Bucharest was raided by rogue Ottoman troops, which pillaged through several neighborhoods. In May, this unlawful action was the object of a formal inquiry by Prince Ghica and Judge Esseid Elias of Giurgiu.

While engaged in the Karazin conspiracy, Pârvu still enjoyed Ghica's trust, and, early in the war, was confirmed as Ban and Spatharios of the Wallachian army. Karazin presented the Cantacuzinos with a manifesto by Empress Catherine the Great, promising to free the Danubian Principalities and the Balkans from the "barbarians' domination". As a sign of favor, the Russians presented Pârvu with a medal bearing her likeness. By then, the "Russian" party was also supported by burghers and commoners, who resented the Phanariote and Ottoman fiscal policies. These, alongside boyars who embraced the cause of "Holy Rus", numbered in the thousands—according to Djuvara, some 12,000 men from Wallachia and Moldavia migrated to Russia and joined the imperial army. In January 1769, with the Russians having taken Moldavia, the Orthodox Church of Wallachia sent a letter to the Empress, asking for their country to be occupied as well. At around that same date, Catherine wrote to Cantacuzino personally. Her reply referred to the Wallachians as a "Slavic people"—according to historian Nicolae Iorga and political scientist Dumitru Th. Pârvu, hers is the earliest record of Pan-Slavism being tested on the locals.

For several months, Karazin's mixed force did not venture out of Moldavia, and remained based at Focșani. Bucharest was pacified by the Ottomans during spring 1769, when the Ottoman army again set up a direct presence. Following its acts of violence against Bucharest civilians, and aware that the Turkish garrison was undermanned, Pârvu created his own volunteer army of Romanians and Arnavutlar (Albanians), joined by some of Karazin's Zaporozhian Cossacks; in the early hours of November 16, these troops ambushed the Ottomans and arrested Prince Grigore. According to various records, including his brother's Genealogia Cantacuzinilor, this victory was in fact obtained by a Moldavian Polkovnik, Ilie Lăpușneanu. A competing account appears in the anonymous rhyming chronicle Răzmerița la intrarea rușilor, which, according to scholar Dan Simonescu, was very likely written by someone from Răducanu's entourage. This poem credits the initiative to a Greek man, Major Zgurali, whose actions were only countersigned by Pârvu. In contrast, Mihai Cantacuzino emphasizes Prince Ghica's own tacit cooperation with the Russians. Records kept by chronicler Necolai Piteșteanul also note Sofronie's participation in the events, as one who escorted Karazin's men on their way in from Focșani. Răzmerița further suggests that Lăpușneanu and Sofronie presented themselves as judges on behalf of the people, proceeding to persecute Bucharest's Jews and Armenians.

Some 5,000 Ottoman soldiers were chased out of the capital, but only as far as Giurgiu, where they recuperated. Following this power vacuum, a group of Wallachian boyars addressed Catherine a letter in which they asked for Wallachia to be annexed as a guberniya. Genealogist Eugène Rizo-Rangabé further notes that Pârvu was made the civilian "Governor of Wallachia" by General Pyotr Rumyantsev; according to Genealogia, he was using the title of Ban, extended to Wallachia as a whole—Ștefan Topliceanu took over as Spatharios. Pârvu then appealed to his in-law, Ienăchiță Văcărescu, who was to obtain for him the submission of the Boyar Council. Văcărescu, the alleged author of a patriotic hymn used by Russia to recruit among the Wallachians, was subsequently dispatched to Buzău County, but used the opportunity to cross the border into neutral Transylvania. As he recalled in his memoirs, he felt pressured by Karazin, and would not commit himself to the Cantacuzinos' unreserved Russophilia. Reportedly, the Cantacuzinos hoped that Pârvu would take over Ghica's throne. This created additional frictions between the boyars, since Văcărescu wanted the throne for himself.

=== Defeat and death ===
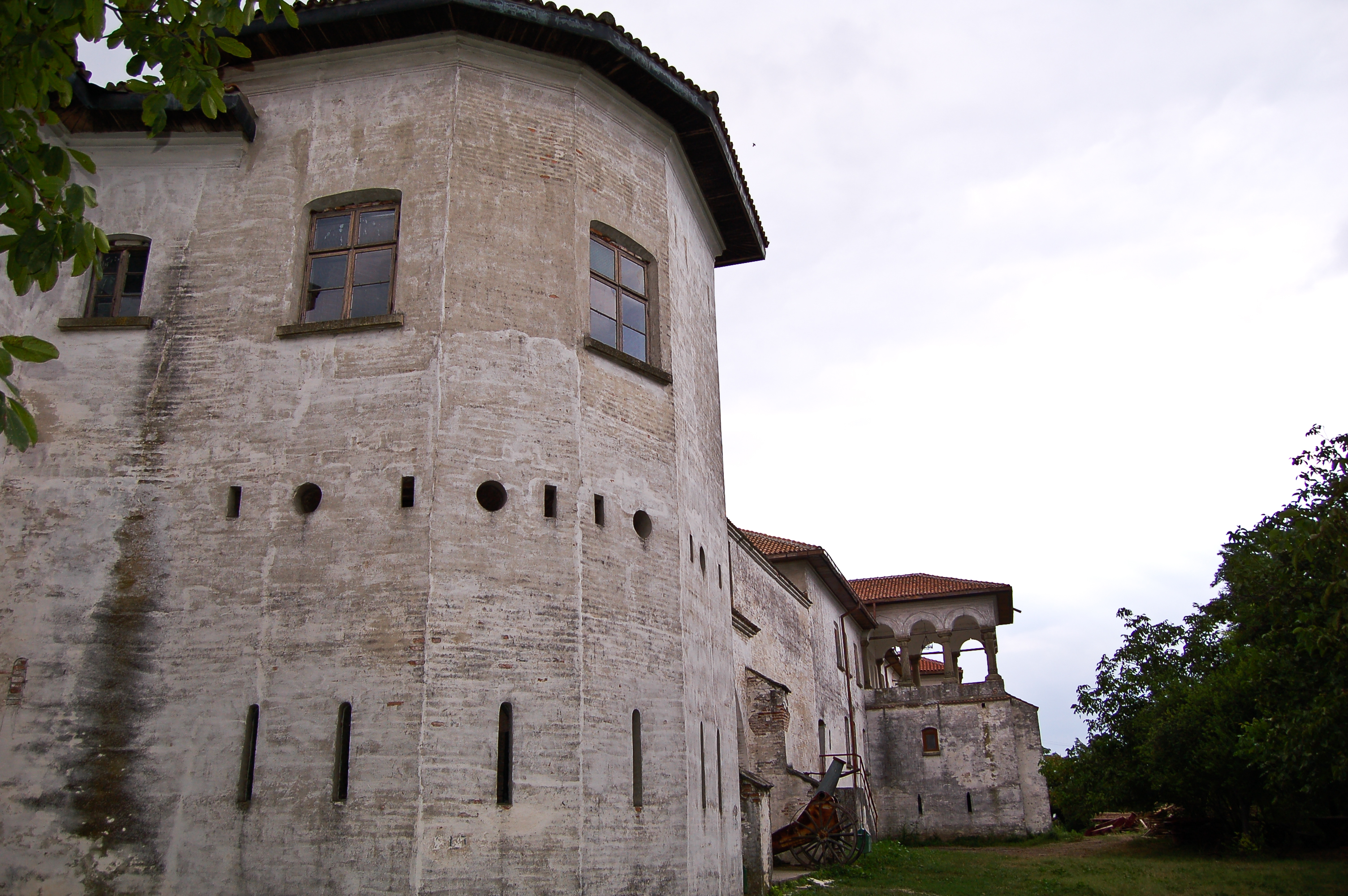
Fortifications of Comana Monastery

A number of setbacks followed the early Russian victory. According to the hostile and disparaging account in Răzmerița, Karazin was disappointed upon entering Bucharest, noting that the Cantacuzinos' army was unprepared for war. One version of the text claims that the troops' actual commandant was a Captain Marco, described as a simpleton (mojic), his army composed of oieri și plugari, țigani și mămăligari ("shepherds and sharecroppers, Gypsies and cretins [literally: men fed on mămăligă]"). The same text suggests that, upon contemplating this vulnerable army, civilians onlookers grew alarmed, and began protesting against the Cantacuzinos. The episode (seen by Simonescu as entirely fabricated) ends with Pârvu's alleviating speech, which reminds them that the revolt was justified by the Romanians' national humiliation under the Phanariote ascendancy, when they had come to "serve" the Greeks. His apocryphal, genocidal, conclusion is:

Moara mai bine să arză
Ca șoarecii să se piarză.

Translation:

Let's then burn down the whole mill,
If it's mice we need kill.

Simonescu notes that such verse is written as an indirect justification for Răducanu: critical of his brothers' lack of military acumen, as much he endorsed their anti-Greek agenda, he did not yet join the revolt in these earliest stages. The Ottomans camped at Giurgiu were simultaneously reinforced by troops from Ruschuk and other garrisons, and placed under a senior commander, Çelebi Agha. This force began marching on Bucharest; Karazin's volunteers, sent to meet them, were defeated and had to barricade themselves in Comana Monastery. Placed in command of a small Russian detachment and a unit of Verzișori or Egheri (Wallachian Jäger), Pârvu Cantacuzino promised to relieve them. He was ambushed by Ottoman troops in Vlăsiei forest, outside Comana. He was killed in the battle of December 10, December 11, or December 15. The same happened to most of his men, including a Russian Major by the name of Andreh and the Verzișori Captain Șerban Lăcusteanu. Some 1,000 soldiers are believed to have been killed on the anti-Ottoman side. Contemporary accounts suggest that only three of Pârvu's Egheri survived the massacre, all of them ending up as Ottoman slaves.

The Comana ambush became a Russian tactical victory. Historian Gheorghe G. Bezviconi proposes that Cantacuzino's sacrifice ensured Karazin's survival. The Ottoman soldiers, believing that they would not be able to contain a stream of Russian new arrivals, backed out of the confrontation and returned to Giurgiu. As reported by Necolai Piteșteanul, they were in fact justified to retreat, since 1,800 Russian grenadiers had been brought in to deal with them. Pârvu's body was recovered by his followers and taken to the nearby monastery. Although the latter had been damaged during the fighting, it was incidentally a traditional Cantacuzino burial site. Pârvu's remains were placed in the tomb of his maternal ancestor, Radu Șerban.

== Legacy ==
Răducanu Cantacuzino took over as Wallachian military commander shortly after his brother's death, having been recognized as such by Nikolai Vasilyeich Repnin. A new Ottoman-appointed Prince, Emanuel Giani Ruset, tried to occupy Bucharest at various intervals from January 1770, ultimately succeeding in June, when the Russians operated a strategic retreat; in August, a large-scale Ottoman defeat at Kagul led to a Russian return, and to the peace of Küçük Kaynarca. Mihai Cantacuzino was appointed Ban by Russian general Ivan Gudovich in November 1770. He was consequently involved in the treaty negotiations, addressing a memorandum in which he outlined the Wallachian grievances and demanded the preservation of autonomy from Ottoman rule, claiming that it had been codified by medieval Capitulations.

The resulting treaty gave Russia sweeping powers of intervention in Wallachian public life, and also offered a general amnesty to Russian favorites, who were allowed to preserve their mobile wealth but had to leave the country. The latter clause was used by Mihai, who settled in Russia, becoming a Major General. He also remained an avid campaigner for the Russian annexation of Wallachia and Moldavia. By 1775, he had donated his immobile estate for charity, establishing a Romanian-language school on the grounds of Livedea Văcărescului (Filaret) Church, Bucharest. He still corresponded with his sister-in-law Smaranda, who may also have intended to settle in Russia by 1776, but ultimately renounced due to her failing health. She died childless and impoverished in Moldavia, at some point between 1791 and 1794. Pârvu's daughter from another marriage, Maria, married in 1770 or 1774 the Moldavian Vornic Teodor Balș Bozianul (1743–1810). In May 1776, she transferred ownership of her father's Bucharest house and the eponymous chapel to the Wallachian Church; local Metropolitans probably used the former building as a private residence, into the 1790s. Bozianul was a widower from around 1783, when he honored the late Maria with a silver chest, granted as a gift to Chiajna Monastery. He also confirmed his wife's donation to the Wallachian Church, and then made his way to Russia.

Mihai died in his Russian exile in 1790, having been recognized as an imperial prince. He had four daughters, one of whom had married Alexey Petrovich, son of Pyotr Melissino. In some records, Răducanu appears as having died serving in the war; other sources note his fleeing to the Russian side, and then with his brother to Russia, where he became a Polkovnik. Their two sons, Nicolae and Ioan Cantacuzino, also took flight and were educated at Russian military schools. Their Cantacuzino branch founded the village of Kantakuzinka (now Prybuzhany, in Ukraine). The cause of "Holy Rus" was still represented in Wallachia by a former 1769 volunteer of Aromanian descent, Dimitrie Varlam, and by Pârvu's returning nephews, Ioan and Nicolae. Nevertheless, Djuvara notes, Russophile enthusiasm in Wallachia declined steadily, especially following the renewed occupation of 1787, making the Russian party "weakest" among all boyar factions by 1800. Of Pârvu's nephews, Ioan endorsed the Austrian occupation of 1789; he also flirted with republicanism, circulating a reform project giving executive powers to the Boyar Council. Withdrawn to Kantakuzinka following disappointment in the war, he started his second career, as a Romanian-language poet and translator of Western literature.

According to scholar Constantin Rezachevici, Pârvu's killing and burial custom can be used as clues in tracing the tomb of a 15th-century Prince, Vlad the Impaler, which may also have been located at Comana. The Cantacuzino revolt was remembered with hostility in records of the 1770s, often known as vremea răsmiriței ("time of troubles") or răsmirița cu muscalii ("troubles with the Moskals"). The rhyming chronicle, which openly mocked the Cantacuzinos, enjoyed great popularity, with numerous handwritten copies surviving into the 20th century. Some variants shed a sympathetic light on the Ban, who is depicted as having died "so as to render us free of the Turkish slavery" (să ne izbăvească din robia cea turcească). The uprising was by then recorded as răzbelul de la Comana ("war of Comana"); the section of the forest were Cantacuzino fell was baptized la bătaia mare a verzișorilor ("Great Battleground of the Verzișori"). Some of the first-hand documents from Pârvu Cantacuzino's chancellery were discovered and published in the 1860s by Cezar Bolliac. Pârvu's attributed work of historiography survives only in a manuscript copy by Naum Râmniceanu, which belonged to Transylvanian intellectual Timotei Cipariu. Râmniceanu plagiarized the text by failing to credit its author, but without noticing that Cantacuzino was still identified in an acrostic and chronogram, which were only described in 1992. Cantacuzino was properly credited as the author of a chronology, which was first sampled in the 1840s in Nicolae Bălcescu's journal, Magasin Istoric pentru Dacia.
