= Battle of Comana Monastery =

1769 Russo-Turkish War battle

- Part of the Russo-Turkish War (1768–1774)
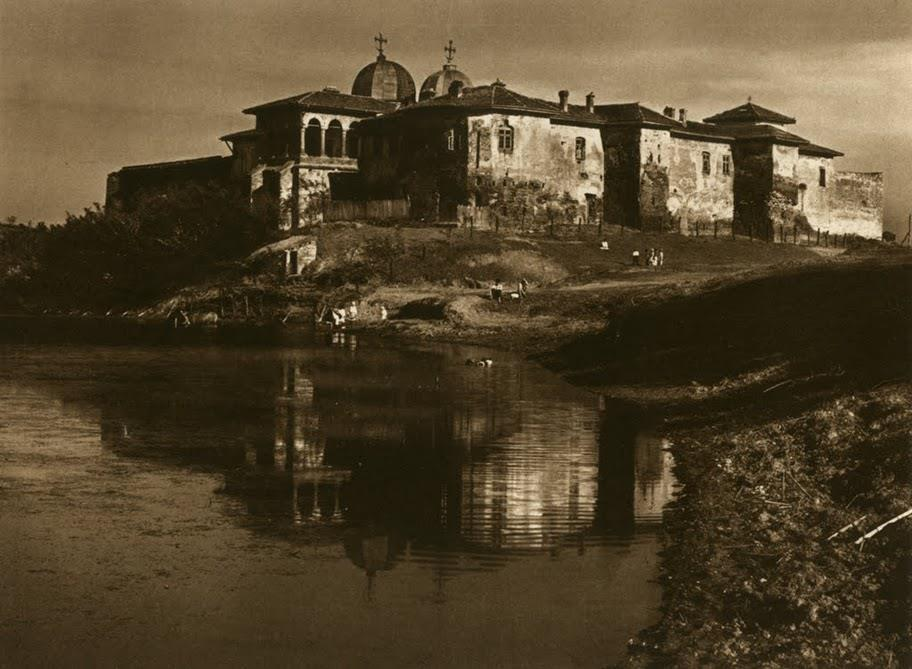
- Comana Monastery, c. 1933
Date	12–14 December 1769
Location	Comana Monastery, Ottoman Empire
Result	Inconclusive

Belligerents
Ottoman Empire	Russian Empire

Commanders and leaders
Süleyman Ağa	Nazar Aleksandrovich Karazin; Major Anrep †

Strength
2,800	800 (Karazin's detachment 350 (Anrep's detachment)

Casualties and losses
2,000	200

The battle of Comana Monastery was a phase of the Russo-Turkish War of 1768–1774, and took place on 12–14 December 1769 during the Transnistria, Moldavia and Wallachia campaigns of the Russian Empire.

== Battle ==
In October 1769, the main forces of the Russian 1st Army was deployed between the Bug and the Dniester for winter quarters, but the campaign did not end despite their intent of wintering. On 31 October, the corps of Lieutenant General Christopher Stofeln containing 5 regiments was sent to Moldavia, and in November they captured the main part of Moldavia up till Galați, where the Turkish-appointed Moldavian prince Constantine Mavrocordatos was taken prisoner.

In the battle of Galați, the detachment of Lieutenant Colonel Fyodor Fabritzian distinguished itself, with its commander being the first to be awarded the order of St. George, 3rd degree. On 21 November, the Russians occupied Bucharest, capturing the Wallachian prince Grigory III Ghica.

Shtofeln was then ordered with most of his detachment to seize Brailov. While he was preparing to march towards this fortress, the Turks launched an invasion to recapture Wallachia from two fronts in early December. From Ruse, Süleyman Ağa with 10,000 men moved towards Bucharest, and from Brailov towards Focșani came Serasker Abdi Pasha with 2,800 men. Stofeln canceled his march to Brailov and sent to meet the Turks the detachments of Lieutenant Colonel N. A. Karazin, Major Anrep and Major-General Alexander Zamiatin; Zamiatian set out from Iași.

Lieutenant Colonel N. A. Karazin's detachment (800 men), which left Bucharest in the direction of Giurgiu, passing the Comana Monastery in the forest near the river Klinesti, encountered the main forces of Süleyman Ağa (8,000 men) and was forced to retreat, hiding behind its stone walls. Süleyman Ağa, who had no cannons, besieged the monastery and waited for the delivery of guns. Major Anrep, who arrived on 11 December with his detachment of 350 huntsmen and two guns to Bucharest, moved from there to the rescue of Karazin.

At dawn on 14 December, in a long gorge near Comana, his detachment was surrounded by a 2,800-strong Ottoman force and repelled their attacks for six hours. The remnants of the detachment, having used up all the ammunition and having lost 135 men killed, including their commander, and both cannons, made their way to Major General Zamyatin's detachment, which approached Bucharest on 14 December.

Despite his success against the detachment of Anrep, Süleyman Ağa, who could not achieve the surrender of the Russian garrison of the monastery of Comana, moved quickly to Focșani to join with the detachment of Abdi Pasha so as to cut off the Russian Bucharest detachment from Iași and defeat it.
