= Rodion Cantacuzino =

Wallachian colonel

Prince Rodion (Radukan) Matveyevich Cantacuzino (Romanian: Radu or Răducanu Cantacuzino; 1725 – 1774) was a Wallachian colonel, a participant of the Russo-Turkish War of 1768–1774. The founder of the Russian branch of the Wallachian Cantacuzino family.

The brother of the Wallachian Spatharios Pârvu Cantacuzino, who was killed in a skirmish with the Turks in 1769, Radukan Cantacuzino joined the volunteers' detachment of Count Rumyantsev's army, acting against the Turks, and participated in the Battle of Kagul. Later he was admitted to the Russian service together with the regiment, which he formed from the natives of Wallachia.

From the marriage with Catherine Mavrocordatos (died in 1811) he had sons Ivan (1756–1828) and Nicholas (1761–1841). His niece Roxana Mikhailovna was the wife of the military general Aleksey Melissino.

== Sources ==
- Novitsky, Vasily (1911–1915). Military Encyclopedia of Sytin. Printing house of Ivan Sytin.
- Polovtsov, Alexander (1896–1918). Russian Biographical Dictionary.
- Brockhaus and Efron Encyclopedic Dictionary. 1890–1907.
