= Andrej Dudrovich =

Russian philosopher and educator

- Born: 1782; Transcarpathia, Kingdom of Hungary
- Died: 6 June 1830 (aged 47–48); Kharkiv, Russian Empire

Academic background
- Education: University of Pest
- Thesis: De philosophiae genuino conceptu nec non necessitate ejus absoluta (1814)
- Academic advisor: Johann Baptist Schad

Academic work
- Institutions: Kharkov University

Andrej Dudrovich (Russian: Андрей Иванович Дудрович; 1782–1830) was a Hungarian-born Russian philosopher, professor and president of Kharkov University during the Age of Enlightenment.

== Biography ==
Andrej Dudrovich was born in Transcarpathia, Kingdom of Hungary before emigrating to Imperial Russia. Like many intellectuals of his generation who received an education abroad, he became influenced by Immanuel Kant's moral teachings. His chief work was a doctoral dissertation dealing with Kant while in the class of Johann Baptist Schad, a Benedictine monk who converted to Protestanism and became one of Kant's disciples in Imperial Russia. Dudrovich was a teacher at the Kharkiv gymnasium, and from 1813 he was invited at Kharkiv University, first as a lecturer in the department of logic, ethics or moral philosophy and natural law.

The following year (1814) he published his doctoral dissertation, De philosophiae genuino conceptu nec non necessitate ejus absoluta (The philosophy is not a true concept and its absolute necessity), under Johann Baptist Schad, his mentor. Dudrovich held that our empirical representations are inconsistent. Since things in themselves cannot be so, "in all probability" these contradictions must lie in our representations. Since reason, which is one and the same, albeit with theoretical and practical function, rejects the very possibility of knowing things in themselves, it, in its practical function, cannot convince us of their reality. Thus, all knowledge is a mere mental game, a fantasy, and in fact, we truly know nothing. We do not want to know things simply appear to us; what we want to know is how things are in themselves.

Timofei Fedorovic Osipovsky and other scientists at Kharkov found themselves at odds with their Kantian philosophers, particularly Atanasije Stojković and Schad. Commenting on a physics textbook by his colleague Stojkovich in 1814, Osipovsky objected to the way it was arranged corresponding to the order of Kant's categories.

Stojkovich was not the first to leave Kharkiv, though it had little or nothing to do with Kantian convictions. Later, with Johann Schad's forced departure, the chair in philosophy remained unoccupied for three years until August 1819 when Dudrovich was named extraordinary professor and invited to the chair of philosophy by the trustees of the university. There, for the next 14 years he lectured on logic, psychology, metaphysics, natural law, and the history of philosophy.

Dudrovich succeeded Schad in teaching philosophy at Kharkiv, even though president Timofei Osipovsky of Kharkiv University opposed Dudrovich who was the dean of the departments and later rector just as intensely as he had Schad. Osipovsky was the principal opponent of German idealism in all its form but especially of Kant, and of Stojkovich and Schad for that matter. In 1830, Osipovsky came into conflict with the Minister of Religious Affairs and Education (Alexander Nikolayevich Golitsyn of the House of Golitsyn) and was eventually dismissed. Dudrovich was named president of Kharkiv University. He died in Kharkiv in 1830.

From the printed works of Dudrovich, except for his book, only one of his speeches remain, originally delivered at a solemn university meeting on August 30, 1815: "De studii academiae natur" in Latin or "The nature of university study".

== See also ==
- Teodor Filipović
- Vasily Karazin, founder of Kharkov University
- Atanasije Stojković
- Gligorije Trlajic

== Sources ==
- Abaschnik Volodymyr. Kant und der Deutsche Idealismus in der kritischen Darstellung von Andrej Dudrovič (1782–1830) // Studia Philosophica Kantiana. 1/2021. p. 5–25.
