= Gligorije Trlajić =

Serbian writer

Gligorije Trlajić (Serbian Cyrillic: Глигорије Трлајић; Mol, Bačka, Hapsburg Monarchy, 25 January 1766 – Harkov, then part of Imperial Russia, 28 September 1811) was a Serbian writer, poet, polyglot and professor of law at the universities of St. Petersburg and Kharkiv (Harkov). He is also known as Gregor Terlaic in German encyclopedias.

== Biography ==
Gligorije Trlajić was educated in Segedin, Buda, and Pesth, and studied law at the University of Vienna before he entered the bureaucracy in the department of justice in which he rose rapidly to be assistant to the solicitor-general in Vienna. His brilliant intellectual qualities attracted the attention of the Imperial Russian ambassador to Vienna; and he became private secretary to Prince Dmitry Mikhaylovich Galitzine (1721–1793). He soon became known as the most competent of the imperial officials. After Galitzine died, he was a private tutor to a Russian archpriest living in Vienna. Trlajić made numerous journeys abroad, but the most important being his 1796 trip to Russia to aid Emperor Paul I of Russia in the reconstruction of Russia's law on western lines. From 1801, Emperor Alexander I of Russia also began to lay the ground work for major law reforms. Alexander introduced ministerial reforms to supplant the collegial model of Peter the Great, accompanied by an expansion of the educational system, founding of new universities, and introduction of civil service examinations and becoming the first foreign, modern law professor in Russia at the same time. There Trlajić taught the history of law and statistics at the Emperor's Pedagogical Institute (later Herzen University) in St. Petersburg. When the institute became a Law School he was made dean. In early 1811 he was invited by Vasily Karazin, founder of the University of Kharkiv, and appointed professor of the university's Law Faculty. Trlajić was fluent in Hungarian, Romanian, German, Old Slavonic, Latin, Greek, Russian, and French.

Trlajić was not like some other Serbs who went to Russia, settled there and completely forgot about their roots. He would return on several occasions and maintained a lively national consciousness of his own. Here is a quote from a book:

"Ja sam, veli on u jednom pismu, svagda ljubio slavno ime Srbin više nego zivot svoj, i starao sam se vazda, u koliko od mene zavisi, činiti mu čast."

(I have, he said in a letter, always loved the famed name of Serb more than my own life, and I always took care, as far it concerned me, to do justice to it).

Writing didactic works was an early and seemingly natural choice of occupation for Trlajić, though never an easy one.

Trlajić died at Kharkiv on 28 September 1811 while still holding tenure at the university. He may be termed the Serbian Xenophon, as Dositej Obradović called him. In style and method his work somewhat resembles that of the ancient Greek author.

== Works ==
Trlajić is a forerunner of Realism and also an early figure in the migration in reverse which, once Serbian literature had achieved a certain maturity, expatriated many intellectuals and scholars over a period of half a century.

In 1810, he published a textbook on Civil Law with a comprehensive introduction on the encyclopedia and the history of law, which according to Odessa Professor Viktor Ivanovich Grigorovich, laid the foundations of Russian civil law doctrine. Up until that point Russian experts in civil law were mainly educated at specialized professional seminars for private law in Berlin, as well as other foreign universities. That same year, he published Mon opinion sur la méthode de traiter l'histoire générale dans cet établissement général. He translated the works of Ludwig Heinrich von Nicolai, Christoph Martin Wieland, Mikhail Kheraskov, Jean-Jacques Rousseau, Marcus Aurelius, and François Fénelon's The Adventures of Telemachus. He also taught at University of Kharkiv where several of his Serbian compatriots were on the teaching staff of the same academic institution at about the same time such as Teodor Filipović (also known as Božidar Grujović), Sava Petrović, Đorđe Koritar, and Atanasije Stojković.

Trlajić also wrote a drama entitled Vseljač, ili retki suprug (A Merry Man, or A Unique Spouse); and the beginnings of a modern, reformed Serbian grammar propagated by Vuk Karadžić.

== See also ==
- Atanasije Stojković
- Teodor Filipović
- Vasily Karazin
- Andrej Dudrovich
