= Nikolay Karazin =

Russian painter

Nikolay Nikolaevich Karazin
- Николай Николаевич Каразин
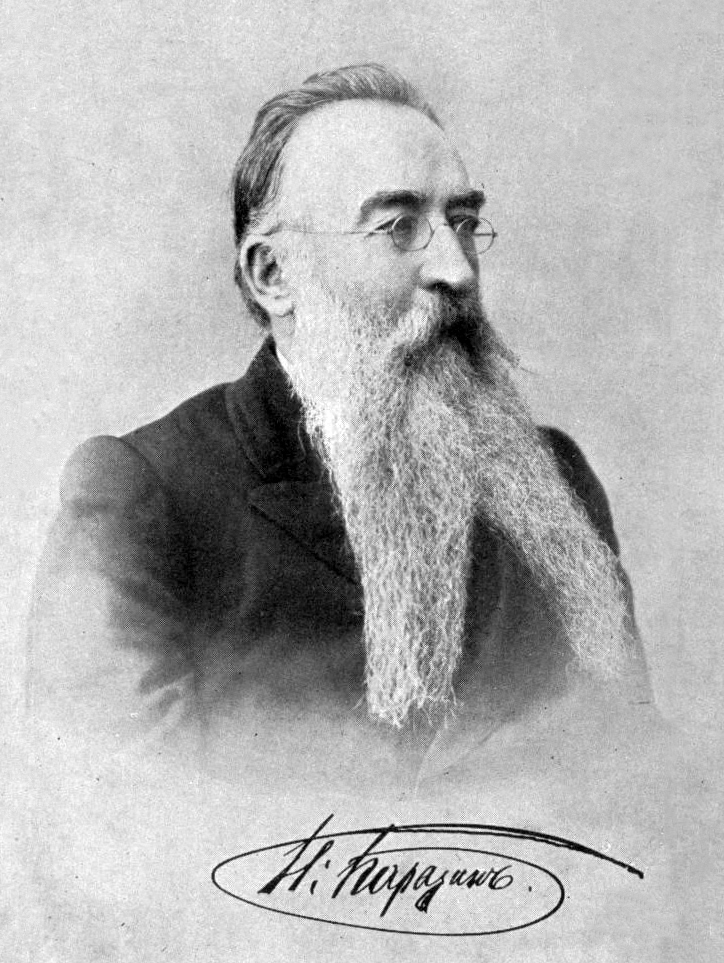
- Nikolay Karazin in 1904
- Born: 1842; Kharkov, Russian Empire
- Died: 1908 (aged 65–66); Gatchina, Russian Empire
- Resting place: Nikolskoe Cemetery, Saint Petersburg
- Occupations: Military officer, painter and writer

Nikolay Nikolaevich Karazin (Russian: Никола́й Никола́евич Кара́зин; born 1842, Kharkov, Russian Empire (today Ukraine) — died 1908, Gatchina, Russian Empire) was a Russian military officer, painter and writer. He is mostly known for his paintings depicting wars and exotic places.

== Biography ==
Nikolay Karazin was born to a family of enlightenment scientists. His grand father Vasily Karazin was a Serbian-born Russian enlightenment intellectual, inventor, and the founder of Kharkiv University. His father Nikolay Vasilivech Karazin was an inventor trying to market a liquid smoke for the "instant smoking" of meats.

Nikolay Karazin graduated from the Moscow cadet school in 1862. In 1865–1867 he studied at the Imperial Academy of Arts in Saint Petersburg.

As a military officer he participated in the campaign against the January Uprising in Poland (1864), and the military campaigns in Turkestan (1864–1870). In 1871 he retired from the military service but as a military correspondent and illustrator he took part in the Russo-Turkish War, 1877–1878 with Serbian and Russian armies. For his military service he was awarded the Order of St. Vladimir and a gold sword. From 1874-1879 he worked on a scientific expedition exploring the Central Asia. In 1885-1886 Karazin travelled to India together with Ivan Minaev. He also travelled to Egypt, Italy, Switzerland and many other exotic places.

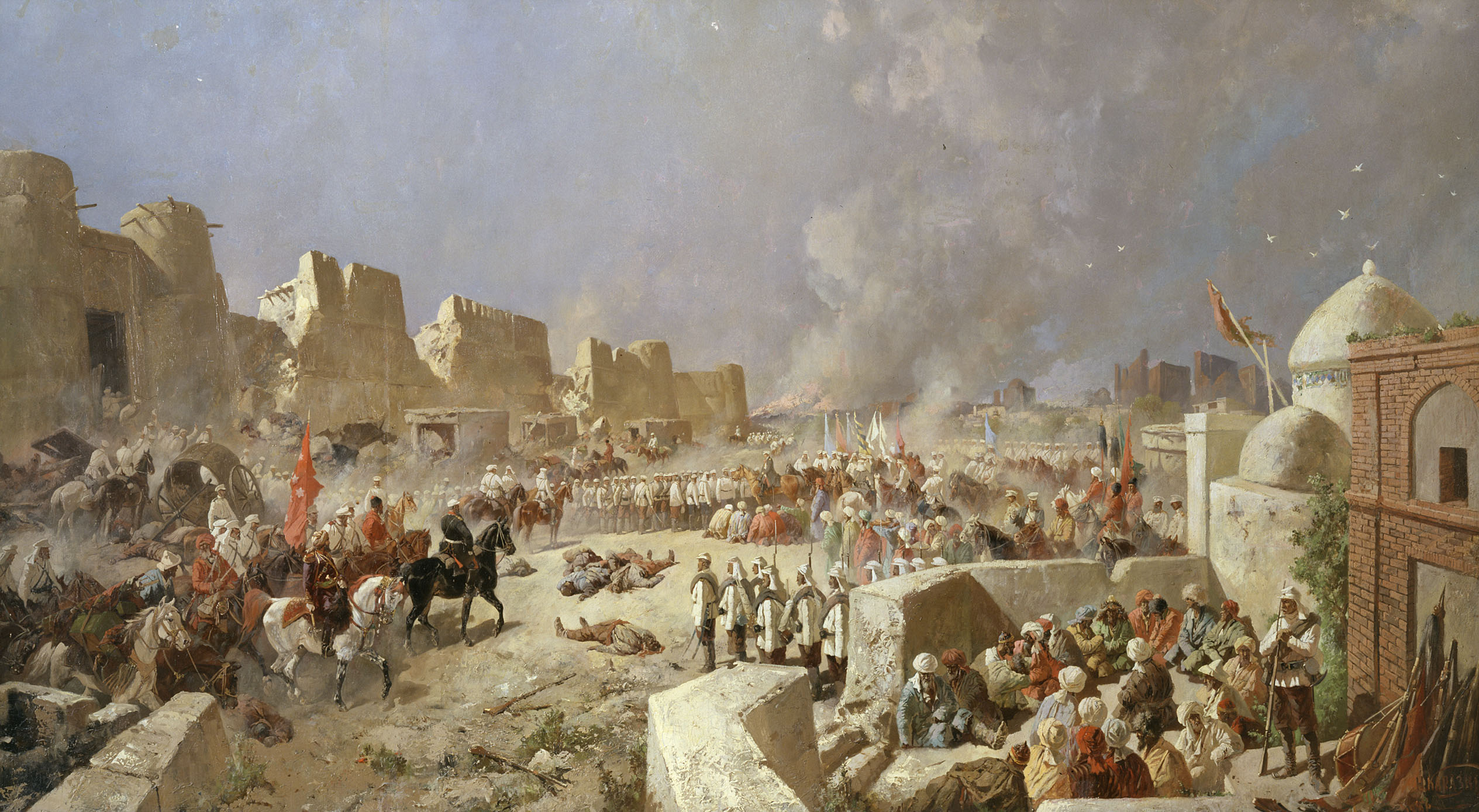
Nikolay Karazin, Russian troops taking Samarkand in 1868

After his retirement from military service, Karazin wrote many adventure and ethnographic stories and novels:

- "На далеких окрайнахъ" (1875; "In the Distant Confines," tr. Anthony W. Sariti, AuthorHouse, 2007)
- "В пороховом дыму" (In the gunpowder smoke, 1878)
- "В камышах" (In the reeds, 1879)
- "Varvara Lepko and her family" (1879);
- "Тигрица" (Tigress);
- "From Orenburg to Tashkent" (1886);
- "Khiva Expedition" (1882); etc.
- The Two-Legged Wolf, English translation, 1894, from Archive.org

The most popular was his children's book, Cranes Flying South, telling the story of a crane migrating from the Ostashkov swamps to the Upper Nile. The book combined an interesting story, geographic descriptions of the places the crane flew and illustrations by the author.

Later Karazin became known mostly as a painter and illustrator. He painted many large canvases devoted to battles and especially military actions in Turkestan. He was a prolific book illustrator and one of the most notable authors of the postcards. In 1902 he participated in the first (rejected by the government) project of the Moscow Metro and produced many paintings showing his vision of the project. In 1904 Karazin became an academician of the Imperial Academy of Arts.

He died in 1908 in Gatchina.

== Works ==
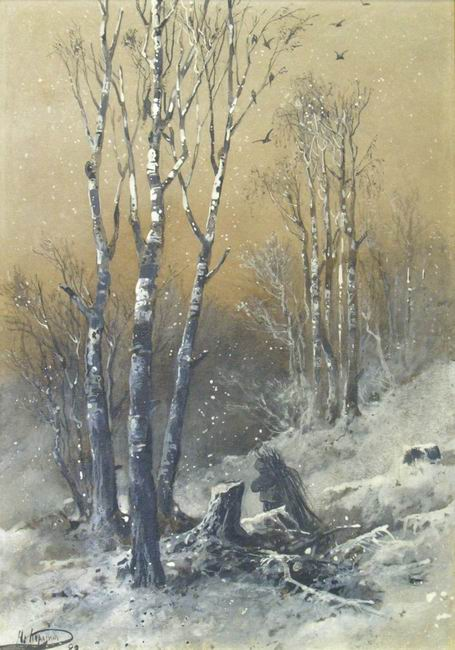
Collecting brushwood in winter, 1888

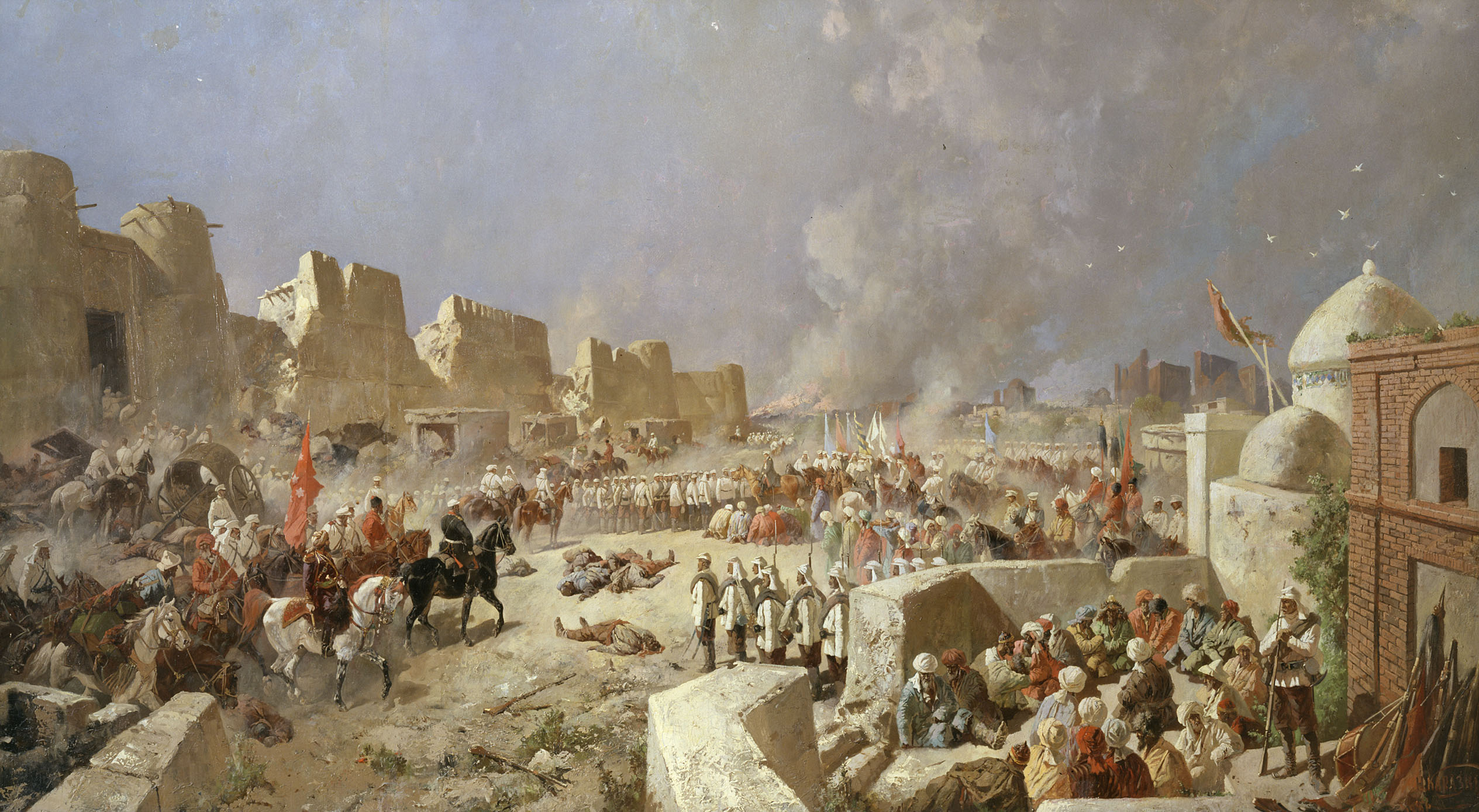
Russian troops taking Samarkand

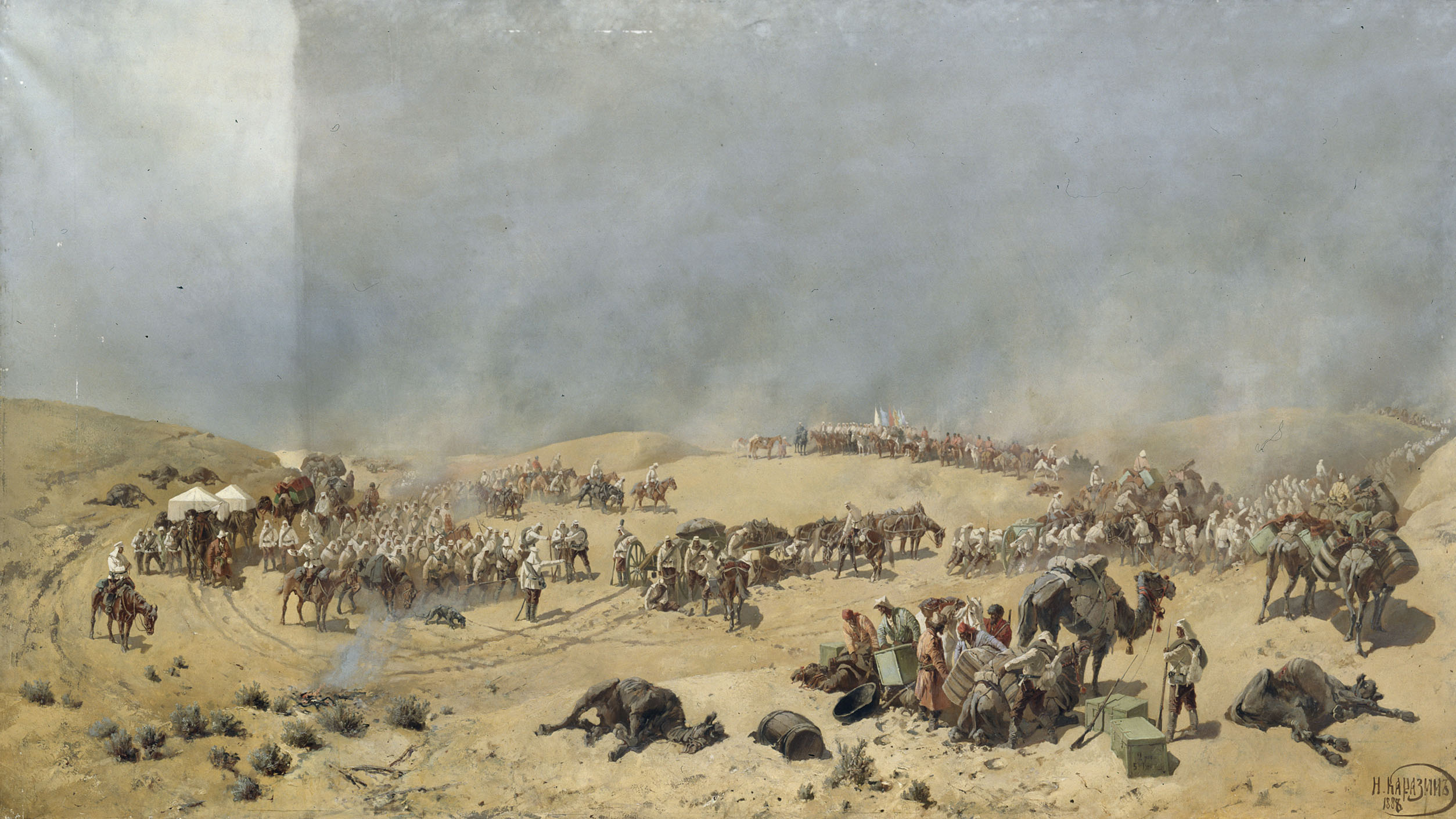
Khiva expedition of 1873. Russian troops crossing the death sands to the wells of Adam-Krylgan, 1888

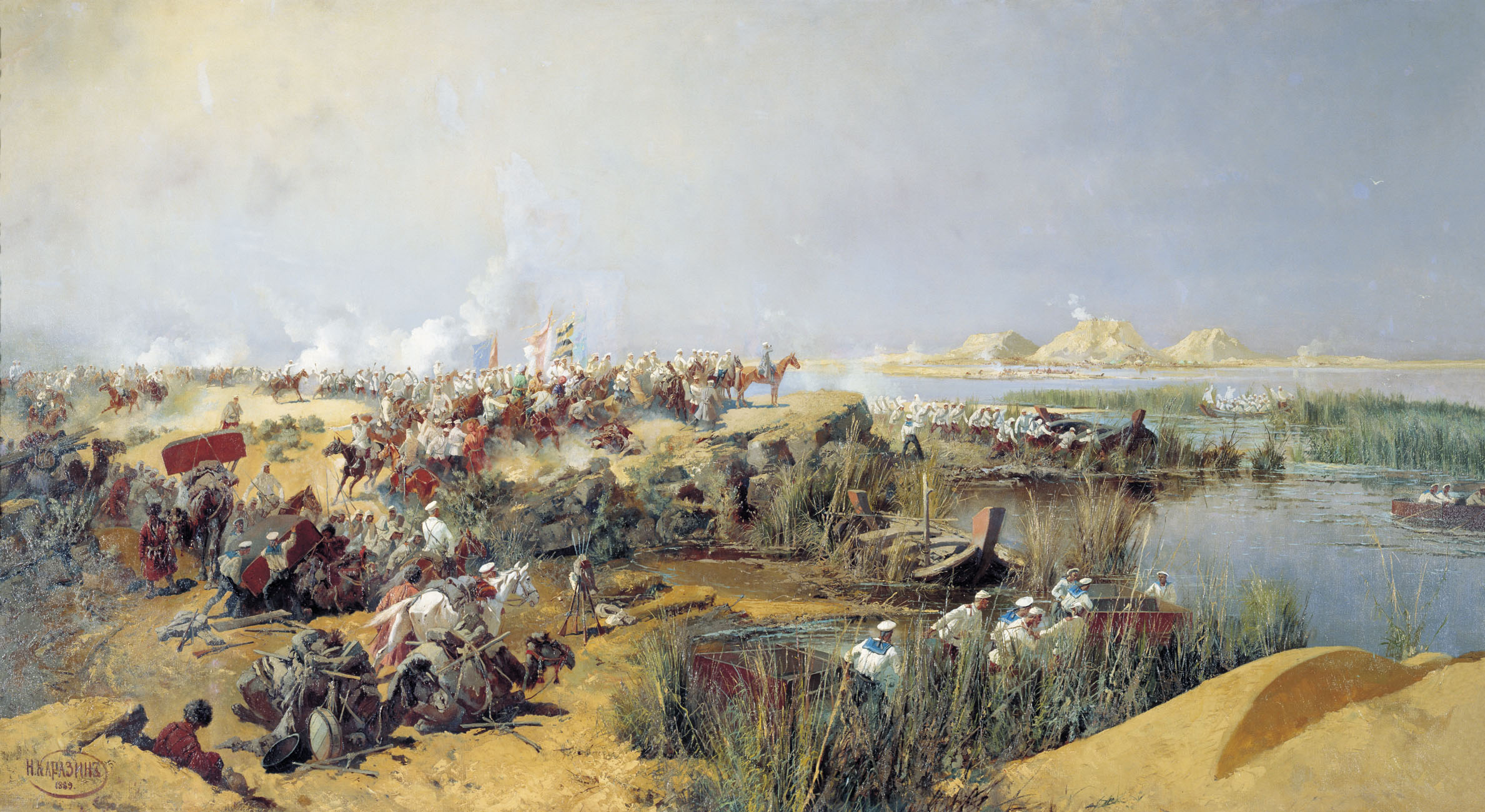
Russian troops crossing Amu Darya in 1873, 1889,

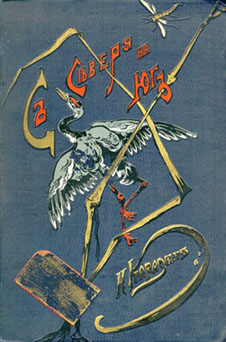
Cover of Karazin's book From North to South: memoirs of an old crane, 1899

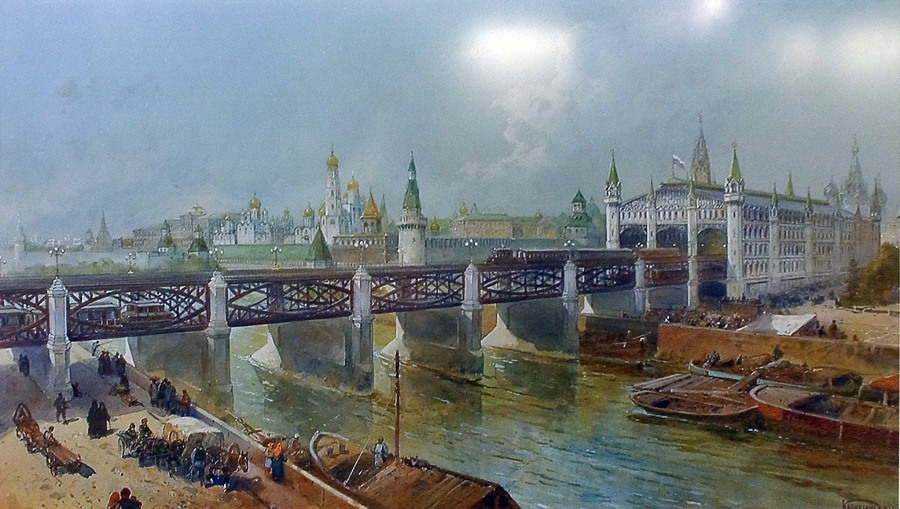
Project of Moscow Metro, 1902

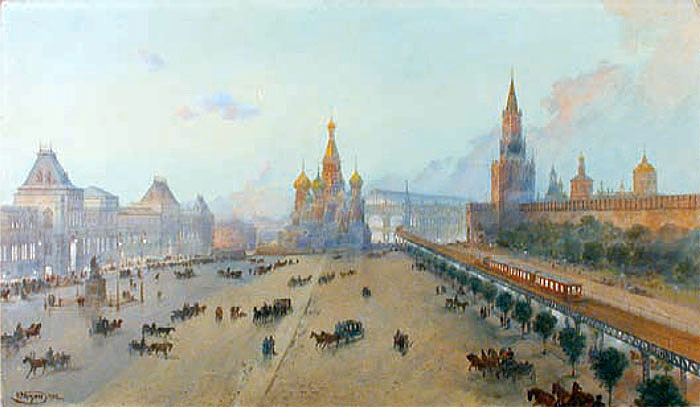
Project of Moscow Metro, 1902

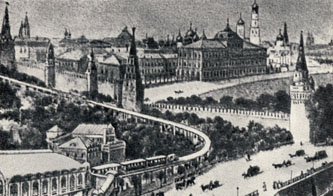
Project of Moscow Metro, 1902

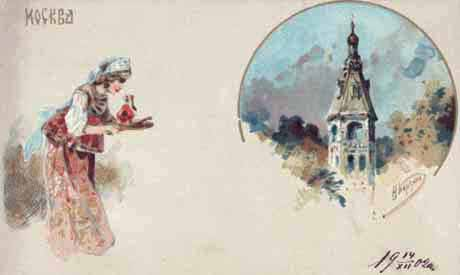
Moscow, postcard

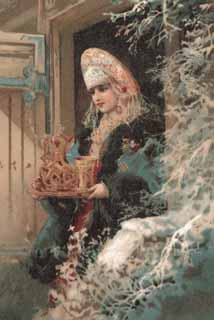
Postcard
