= Teodor Filipović =

Serbian writer and philosopher

- Born: Teodor Filipović; 6 April 1778; Ruma, Habsburg monarchy
- Died: 25 April 1807 (aged 29); Deutschbrod, Habsburg monarchy
- Other names: Teodor Janković-Mirijevski; Teodor von Filipowicz; Božidar "Boža, Božo" Grujović
- Occupations: Writer, philosopher, educator, jurist

Education
- Education: University of Vienna

Philosophical work
- Era: Age of Enlightenment
- Region: Western philosophy
- School: Liberal thought
- Main interests: Political philosophy, pedagogy, law
- Notable works: Sovjeti zdravago razuma (Advice of Common Sense)

Teodor Filipović (Serbian Cyrillic: Теодор Филиповић; 1778–1807), known by the pseudonym Božidar Grujović (Божидар Грујовић), and Boža or Božo (Божа/Божо Грујовић) was a Serbian writer, jurist, philosopher and educator.

Teodor Filipović was born in the town of Ruma in Syrmia, then part of the Kingdom of Slavonia in the Habsburg monarchy, in 1778. He attended schools in Sopron, Segedin, Pozun and studied law at the University of Pest. After graduation, he was appointed professor of law history at the University of Kharkov in Imperial Russia in 1803. In 1805 he took the nom de guerre of Božidar Grujović before leaving his post as a university professor to go to Karađorđe's Serbia to fight the Turks. He was the first secretary of Serbia's Governing Council, and Karađorđe's legal counsellor, who helped establish a centralized constitutional civil government (which lasted until 1813). Other educators, Mihajlo Grujović (brother of Teodor Filipović) and Ivan Jugović, came to take the post of secretaries of Karađorđe's Governing State Council after Filipović died in 1807.

After the First Serbian Uprising in 1804, this lawyer from Ruma (then ruled by Austrian Empire), who received his doctor of law degree from the University of Budapest and for a while taught History of Law with his fellow Serbs, law professor Gligorije Trlajić and physicist Atanasije Stojković at the new Imperial Kharkov University (founded by Vasily Karazin and established in 1804 by Emperor Alexander I of Russia), joined his compatriots in Serbia in their fight for independence. The shock of that seizure had salutary results in Serbia, for it called into existence a widespread spirit of patriotism, especially among the youth. Education was fostered, and an enlightened parliament began to prepare a new constitution that should rid the obstructive Turkish ways. Religious toleration and the equality of all citizens before the law were proposed. In Belgrade in 1805 Grujović (Filipović) wrote the Decree of the Governing Council (Praviteljstvujušči sovjet as it was called in Serbian) and Slovo (Speech), a Serbian version of the French Declaration of the Rights of Man and Citizen of 1793. He also went by the name Stevan Filipović during the post of first secretary of the Governing Council. It addressed the many unresolved questions plaguing Serbia and its people (who had enough of Turkish rule), such as issues concerning liberty, property, and human dignity. Grujović stood passionately for legality, rule of law, and social justice. The foundation of his decree (and its laws) was based on democratic and liberal ideas of rationalism and justice. Grujović may also be credited for setting the bed stones of constitutionality during the resurrection of the Serbian state. He is, therefore, justifiably referred to as the first Serbian constitution maker. Grujević's principal stand was that there could be no freedom without economic independence while stressing the importance of education for everyone. He was Dositej Obradović's most ardent supporter when Dositej advocated agricultural development based on the use of modern technology. Filipović was part of a group of Serbian economic thinkers (such as Dositej Obradović, Zaharije Orfelin, Jovan Muškatirović, Ivan Jugović, Pavle Solarić, Emanuilo Janković, Atanasije Stojković, Vićentije Rakić and others) who supported the cameralist principles of rational economic conduct and the development of new sciences and methodologies.

Grujović wrote: Gdi nema slobode, tu nema života (Where there is no freedom; there is no life).

Grujović died of tuberculosis at Belgrade in 1807.

His younger brother, Mihailo Filipović, also taught at the University of Kharkov.

== See also ==
- Gligorije Trlajić
- Atanasije Stojković
- Vasily Karazin
- Andrej Dudrovich
- List of Serbian Revolutionaries
