= Pyotr Melissino =

18th-century Russian artilleryman

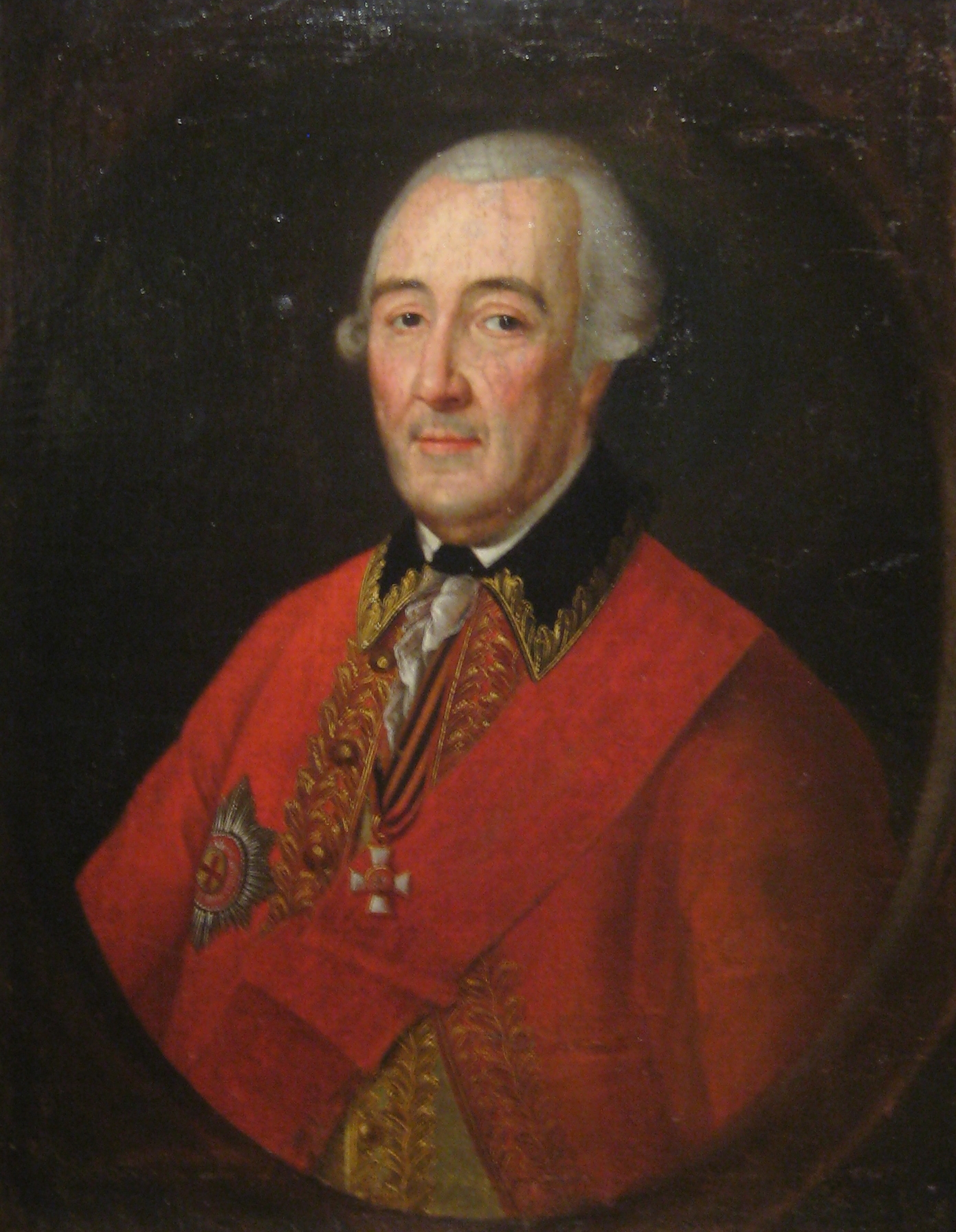
- A portrait of General of the Artillery Pyotr Melissino in the Kursk gallery, Russia.
- Born: c. 1726; Cephalonia, Venetian Republic
- Military career
- Allegiance: Russia
- Service years: 1740 — 1797
- Rank: General of the Artillery

Pyotr Ivanovich Melissino (Greek: Πέτρος Μελισσηνός, romanized: Petros Melissinos, Russian: Пётр Мелиссино, French: Pierre De Mellisino); c. 1726 – c. 1797) was a General of the Artillery of the Russian Empire and was widely considered the best Russian artilleryman of the 18th century.

== Early life ==
He was born as Petros Melissinos Greek: Πέτρος Μελισσηνός in 1726, into a Greek family, in the island of Cephalonia, which was then under Venetian rule. His father was a physician who descended from a branch of the noble Eastern Roman family of Melissenos that had left Crete in the 15th century and settled on Cephalonia. Throughout his life, he prided himself on his origin. He received a thorough education in his youth and was fluent in many languages, including Russian, German, Italian, French, and Turkish, as well as his native Greek; he also knew some Latin and English.

== Career ==
Melissinos arrived in Russia during the reign of Peter the Great and ended his career as Vice-President of the Commerce Collegium in 1740-45.

During the Russo-Turkish War, 1768-1774, Pyotr Melissino was in charge of the Russian artillery. His efficient command helped Russian forces prevail against a fourfold numerical superiority of the Ottomans at Khotin, Larga, and Kagula. In 1783, he was appointed Director of the Artillery and Engineering Corps in St. Petersburg. He is remembered as an organizer of the artillery education in the Russian Empire. After the ascension of Emperor Paul, Melissino was put in charge of the entire Russian artillery but died the following year.

Melissino was instrumental in promoting the career of one of Paul's favourites, Aleksey Arakcheyev. His son Aleksey Melissino, a Major General, was killed in the Battle of Dresden (1813). His brother, Ivan Melissino, was Dean of the Moscow University under Catherine the Great.

Jenkins (pp. 35–36) says:

Melissino himself was intelligent and ambitious and was doing much to promote the cause of the artillery. He could certainly have enjoyed an even more illustrious career were it not for certain defects of character which made him appear less serious about his profession than was in fact the case. He had a reputation of being vain, weak, and a spendthrift. He was a prominent figure in Saint Petersburg society; he spoke several languages, fenced and danced well, and was an authority on the theater. But it was difficult to take him seriously, and society had nicknamed him "le grand seigneur manqué." Nonetheless, the school rapidly acquired a name under him, and in very little time the number of cadets more than doubled. The sensible changes in the studies which he introduced with the help of his abler pupils bore fruit; and the major reform in the artillery which subsequently took place was largely the work of his former pupils.

== Sources ==
- Michael Jenkins, Arakcheev: Grand Vizier of the Russian Empire (Dial Press, 1969)
