= Vasily Karazin =

Russian scientist (1773–1842)

- Василий Каразин
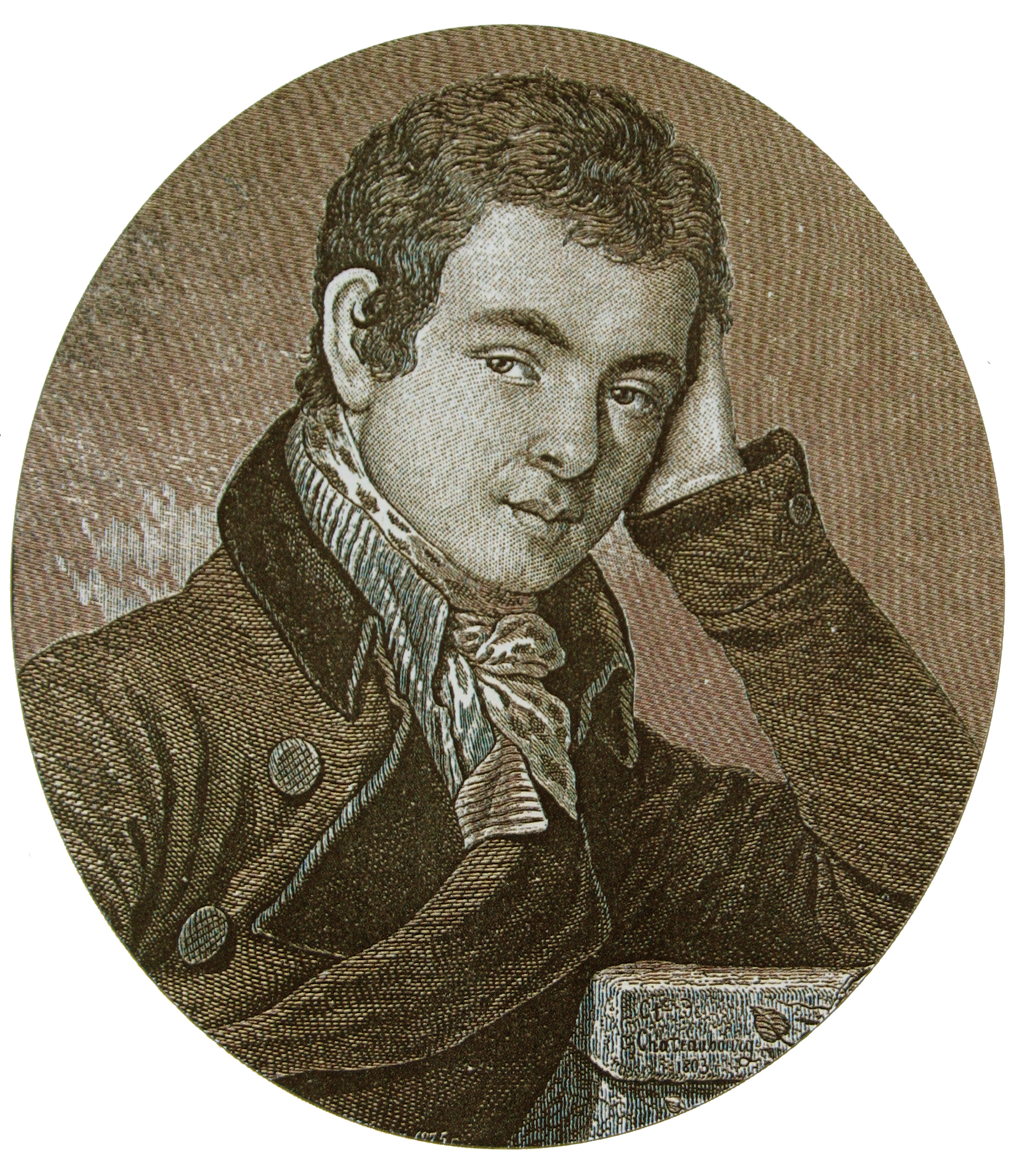
- Portrait of V. N. Karazin
- Born: 30 January 1773; Kruchik, Sloboda Ukraine Governorate, Russian Empire (now Kruchyk, Kharkiv Oblast, Ukraine)
- Died: 4 November 1842 (aged 69); Nikolayev, Kherson Governorate, Russian Empire (now Mykolaiv, Ukraine)
- Resting place: Necropolis of Mykolaiv
- Known for: Founder of the Imperial Kharkov University

Vasily Nazarovich Karazin (Russian: Василий Назарович Каразин; Ukrainian: Василь Назарович Каразін (Каразин), romanized: Vasyl Nazarovych Karazin (Karazyn); 30 January 1773 – 4 November 1842) was a Russian Enlightenment figure, intellectual, inventor, scientific publisher, founder of the Ministry of National Education in the Russian Empire, and of the Imperial Kharkov University (now the V. N. Karazin Kharkiv National University in Ukraine). He was active in such areas as: political activism, social engagement, education, educational policy, agricultural research, meteorology. Made countless discoveries in organic and inorganic chemistry, was the first one to propose to make a network of weather station spanning the whole country.

== Biography ==
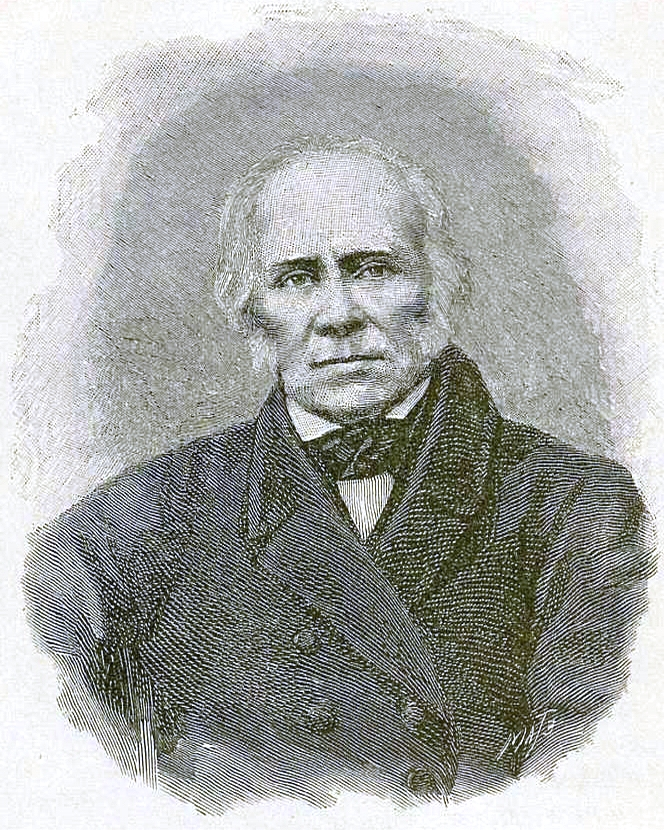
Vasily Karazin

Karazin was born in Kruchik village, Kharkov Governorate in the Russian Empire (now Ukraine). The Karazins originated from the noble family of Karadzhi or Karadžić, whose representatives migrated to Russia during the reign of Peter the Great. His father was Nazary Aleksandrovich Karazin, a Russian Imperial Army officer noted for his involvement in Pârvu Cantacuzino's 1769 rebellion in Wallachia. Karazin's mother Varvara belonged to Russian nobility and was of partial Cossack starshyna ancestry. Vasily Karazin considered himself to be ethnic Serbian while his paternal family were originally known as Karadžić, which has Serb Montenegrin origins. He was married to Alexandra Mukhina from Moscow, who was well known as a translator of French literature into Russian; her stepfather was the Russian Imperial General major Egor von Blankennagel.

Karazin was educated in schools for the nobility in Kharkov and then in Kremenchug. At the age of eighteen, he left for Saint Petersburg, and underwent military training in the 1st Semyonovsky Independent Rifle Regiment. He also studied at the School of Mines, one of the top educational institutions in the Russian Empire at that time. Karazin was unhappy in this environment, and often reacted against the manners and customs condoned by the nobility of the times. Unsatisfied with his military service, he moved back to his village and married a fourteen-year-old serf girl.

In 1798 Karazin attempted to leave Russia given his opposition to the policies of Emperor Paul I, but was denied a passport. After he attempted to cross the border illegally, he was swiftly arrested.

When Alexander I took power, Karazin began petitioning him with his views on government development, pointing out the state's need to invest in education. In 1802 he obtained the tsar's permission to open a university in Kharkov. On 1 September of that year, during a meeting of the Kharkov nobility, he gave a famous speech on the benefits of having a university, asking for voluntary donations. Lacking sufficient funding and academic supplies, Karazin struggled to achieve his educational priorities. The local elite preferred to have a military college in the city.

On 17 January 1805, the Imperial Kharkov University was inaugurated, but Karazin did not take part in the opening ceremony, as by that time he had lost his position with the Ministry of Education. According to Alexander Herzen, "the colossal ideas of Karazin were downscaled to a provincial German Hochschule". Forced to return to his village, Karazin established a school for local children. In November 1808, he wrote a letter to the emperor titled On non-intervention in European affairs for which he was arrested for a second time.

Karazin carried out a wide range of academic work. He was a member of seven academies and published more than 60 articles in different fields of science, primarily agriculture, pharmacology, chemistry, and physics. As an example of his innovative spirit, in 1810 in his village he opened the first weather station in the territory of present-day Ukraine. In 1811-1818 Karazin served as head of the Lharkiv Philotechnical Society.

Karazin repeatedly voiced criticism of what he viewed as Alexander's resistance to self-government and national education in the Russian Empire. Karazin was the founding father of the Ministry of National Education. His direct confrontation with Emperor Alexander I was so public, that in 1820–21 Karazin was even imprisoned in Shlisselburg Fortress. After that he lived in his family estate. Karazin died in Nikolaev.

The Russian painter and writer Nikolay Karazin was his grandson.

== Views and legacy ==
Karazin was a political liberal, who promoted the abolition of serfdom and adoption of constitutional monarchy. In the sphere of economy he sympathized to the ideas of physiocracy and mercantilism. He supported the replacement of three-field system, adoption of new grain varieties cultivation of potatoes and oil plants. Karazin opposed regional specialization in certain branches of industry and promoted the introduction of metallurgy, textile and food industry in Ukraine. He was a promoter of international trade, and criticized the predominant role of Ukrainian lands as a source of raw materials for the Russian Empire, which was typical for colonial practices.

In 1910 a collection of Karazin's works was published by Kharkiv University in the edition of Dmytro Bahalii.

== See also ==
- Kharkiv University (V. N. Karazin Kharkiv National University), University in Kharkiv named in his honour
- Andrej Dudrovich
- Atanasije Stojković
- Teodor Filipović
- Gligorije Trlajić
- Sava Petrović
- Đorđe Koritar
