= Pavel Đurković =

Serbian artist (1772–1830)

Pavle or Pavel Đurković (1772 – 1830) was a Serbian painter, portraitist and iconographer who distinguished himself in the iconography of monasteries and portraits of great personalities (mostly Serbs).

His greatest work was the iconostasis of the church in Vršac and Bela Crkva from around 1792. Đurković "icon painter from Buda", because from 1793. he painted icons on the iconostasis of the White Church of Saint Peter and Paul.

== Biography ==
Đurković was born in Baja, Kingdom of Hungary.

He traveled to large cities and towns and portrayed wealthier citizens. Thus, in 1811, he made a portrait of Archimandrite Pavle Hadžić. In 1812, he worked in Zemun for the Karamata family, and in 1816 he portrayed Vuk Karadžić and Lukijan Musicki in Šišatovac. In 1820, he painted Metropolitan Stratimirović in Sremski Karlovci.

After 1820, he traveled to Wallachia and Russia, painting along the way, and settled in Odessa, where his work went very well, where he progressed as an artist and made an extraordinary portrait of Professor Atanasij Stojković, who may have invited him to Russia, as one of his last works and as proof of his art of portraiture.

At the invitation of Prince Miloš on April 23, 1823, he arrived in Serbia to portray him and his family - Princess Ljubica and daughters Savka and Stanko. The artist worked in Kragujevac and Belgrade, where he worked at the prince's request. On March 21, 1824, Đurković finished the portrait of Prince Miloš. It was the second known painting in a row in liberated Serbia, after the Second Serbian Uprising.

He died in 1830. in city of Odessa (modern day Ukraine, then part of Russian Empire), he was 57/58 years old when he died.

== Gallery ==
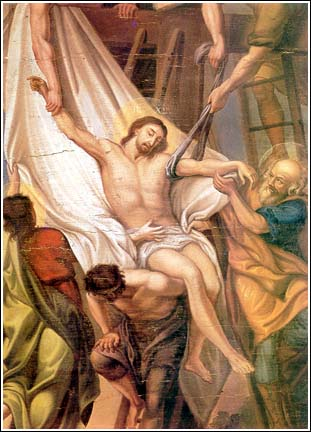
Pavel Đurković - Christ Being Removed from the Cross

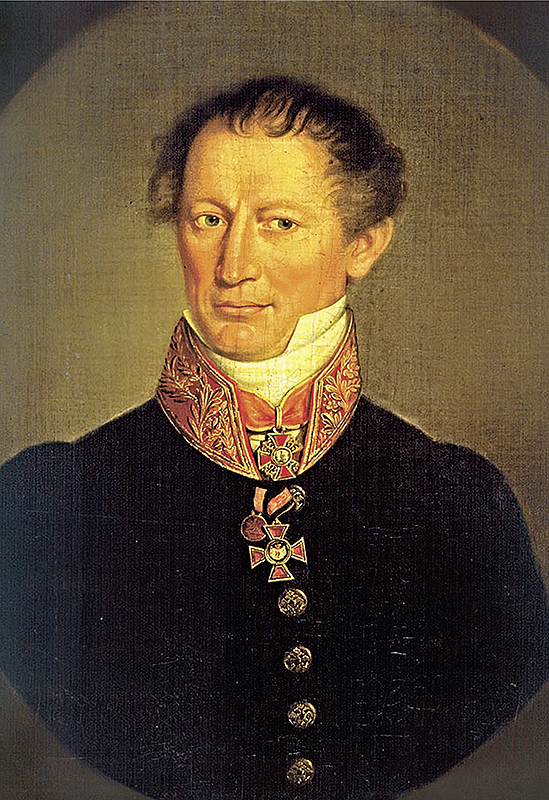
Pavel Đurković - Atanasije Stojković

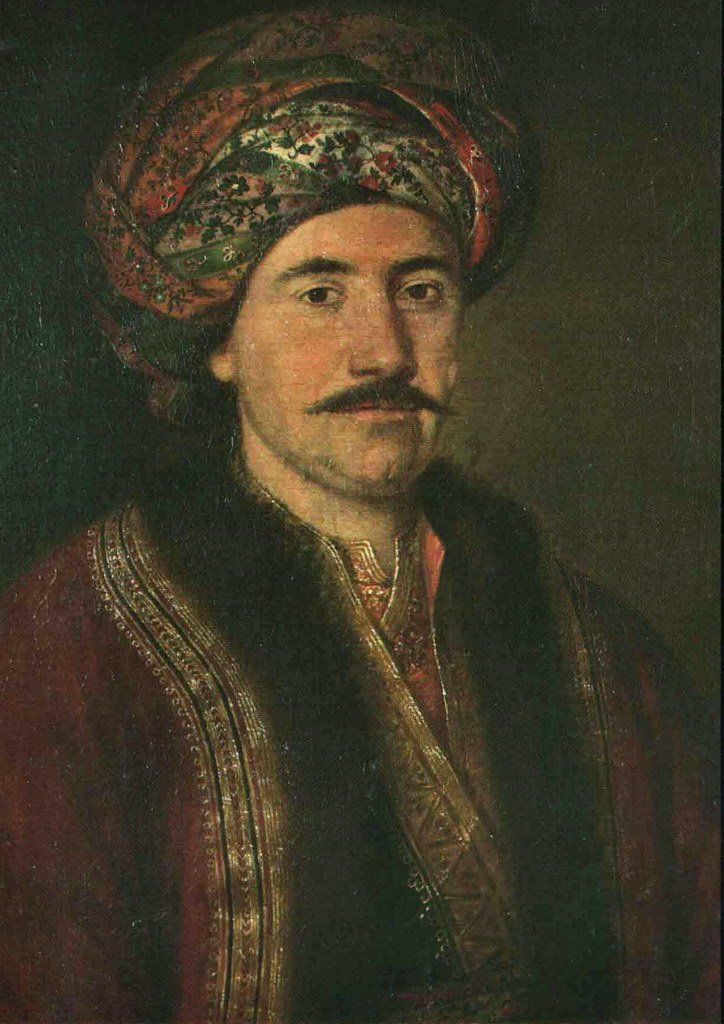
Pavel Đurković - Miloš Obrenović

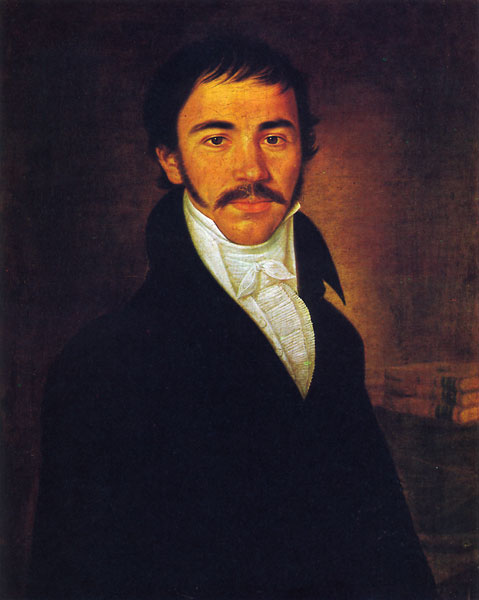
Pavel Đurković - Vuk Karadžić (1816)

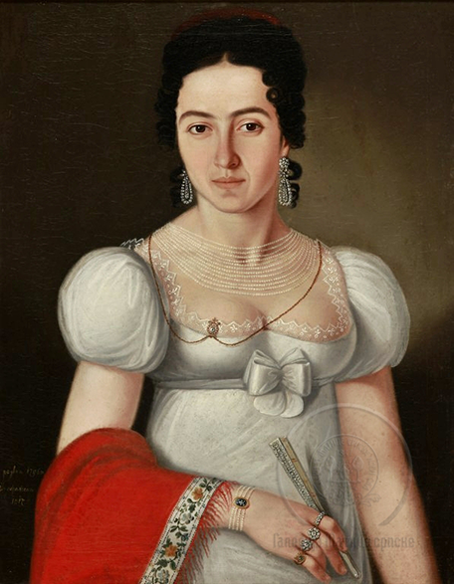
Pavel Đurković - A woman with a red scarf, (1817)

== See also ==
- List of painters from Serbia
- Serbian art
- Paja Jovanović
- Obrenović
