= Atanasije Stojković =

Serbian-Russian physicist (1773–1832)

Atanasije Stojković Атанасије Стојковић
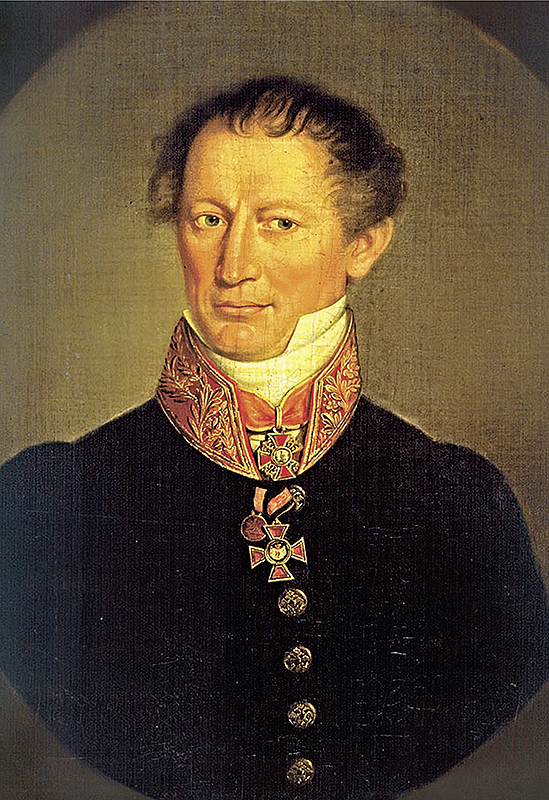
- Painting of Anastasije Stojković, work of Pavel Đurković
- Born: Атанасије Стојковић; 20 September 1773; Ruma, Habsburg monarchy
- Died: 2 June 1832 (aged 58); Kharkov, Russian Empire
- Occupations: Scientist, writer

Atanasije Stojković (Serbian Cyrillic: Атанасије Стојковић, Serbo-Croatian pronunciation: [atanǎsije stǒːjkoʋit͡ɕ]; 20 September 1773 – 25 September 1832) was a Serbian, Austrian and Russian writer, pedagogue, scholar, physicist, mathematician and astronomer. He is considered the founder of Russian meteoritics. Stojković was the Rector of the Imperial University of Kharkov from 1807 to 1809 and from 1811 to 1813.

== Early life and education ==
Stojković was born in Ruma, then part of the Austrian Empire (now modern-day Serbia) on 20 September 1773. He finished grammar school in his native village of Ruma in Srem. From 1789 to 1794 he attended the École polytechnique at Buda and later the University of Göttingen until 1798. His education (at Buda and Göttingen) was funded by the Metropolitan of the Serbian Orthodox Church at Sremski Karlovci, Stevan Stratimirović, and subsequently in Sremski Karlovci itself, where Stojković proposed to take orders. Upon graduation and on returning home, however, he abandoned the idea in favor of his academic and scientific careers. It was during his studies at the University of Budapest, where he was inspired by lectures and it was there that he determined to devote himself to natural science, mathematics, physics and astronomy.

Stojković took his undergraduate degree in philosophy in 1796, and for a time pursued the study of philosophy and natural science at the University of Göttingen. He graduated in 1798 with a doctorate in Philosophy and Natural Science. He became a member of the Mineralogical Society in Jena. Mainly through the influence of Dositej Obradović he turned his attention to literature and science, and during the years 1801 and 1804 made a special study of astronomy.

It was during his university days that he began his researches in physics which led to his extensive treatise on that subject. This work — Fisika — was published in 1801–1803 in three volumes.

== From Professor to Rector ==
Severyn Osipović Potocki secured him in 1799 as professor of physics—its first—at the Imperial University of Kharkov (1805–1813) and within a short period he became a member of the Russian Academy of Sciences and served as the university's rector (1807–1808 and 1811–1813). He was already acquainted with Pierre Charles Le Monnier and his son-in-law, Joseph-Louis Lagrange, a member of the French Academy of Sciences, which had become part of the Institut de France (1795) and through their work in astronomy Stojković decided to make Meteor Science his life's work. As a member of the newly instituted commission of education at the new university, he rendered invaluable service to his adopted country (Imperial Russia) for the next several years.

From 1821 until 1829 he was a professor of geology at St. Petersburg and he corresponded with members of the Geological Society of France (1830) and influenced the work of the next generation of geologists, Ami Boué (1794–1881), Gerard Paul Deshayes (1795–1875) and Jules Desnoyers (1800–1887). Before Charles Lyell (1797–1875), Stojković advocated a study of the causes or forces now in action in order to illustrate the past.

In 1824 his translation of the New Testament was published by the Russian Bible Society at St. Petersburg. Initially Stojković only planned to rework the spelling and language of Vuk Karadžić's unpublished Shtokavian translation, to bring it in line with the then-preferred conservative Slaveno-Serbian idiom, but eventually turned to creating his own translation. The first edition was not approved by the Serbian metropolitan Stefan Stratimirović, and had to be destroyed. The text became available to the general public only with the second and third editions (1830, 1834). Due to Stojković's choice of the archaic idiom, the translation was viciously criticised by Đuro Daničić, a follower of Vuk Karadžić and proponent of using the folk Shtokavian idiom in literature. Daničić also accused Stojković of plagiarising Vuk's translation, although later research has shown that the two translations are independent of each other.

Stojković was known in Imperial Russia, Austrian and Ottoman empires as one of the most enlightened and zealous teachers of the time. As professor of physics, and regent of schools, Stojković was the ornament of the University of Kharkov during the time he was there. He published improved editions of several scholastical and philological works. He wrote books in Russian on the foundation of physics and physical astronomy.

In Krasnoyarsk Krai, Russia, where the Tunguska event took place on 30 June 1908, a hill is named after Atanasije Stojković. Teodor Pavlović (1804–1854) wrote and published a detailed biography of Atanasije Stojković titled Russian Emperor's Governmental Counselor.

== Published works ==
Stojković's work on physics, Fisika, was published in 1801–1803 in three volumes. It was the first extensive treatise on the topic in Serbia, and was positively received by the Serbian audience. However, because of the archaic language it did not remain influential for long.

His 1800 book Kandor or Revelation of Egyptian mysteries is often described as the first original Serbian novel. However, its status as a novel has been disputed, as its narrative content is underdeveloped: the majority of the text is occupied by a monologue, interspersed with poems, and expressing concepts heavily influenced by Immanuel Kant's philosophy. Thus, it has also been classified as a primarily philosophical text, rather than a proper novel. Freemasonic and possible esotericist symbolism has also been detected in the text; the novel would thus present an initiationary process of the titular character.

Stojković's following novel, Aristid and Natalija (1801), was more conventional, and is regarded as one of the central texts of Serbian literary sentimentalism. Its subtitle, Part One, suggests that the author intended to publish a continuation.

He was a member of the Göttingen Academy of Sciences and Humanities. The first book presented to the library of Matica srpska was presented by Stojković.

In his literary works he used the Slavonic-Serbian language and belongs to a group of authors who brought the German version of the Enlightenment to Serbs. After completing his education Stojković moved to Kharkov, Russia. He died in Kharkov on 2 June 1832. While in Imperial Russia, he held the position of Russian-Emperor's Governmental Counselor. Stojković was awarded the Order of Saint Vladimir.

== Selected works ==
- Кандоръ или Откровеніе егѵпетскихъ таинъ (Kandor, or a Revelation of Egyptian Mysteries, 1800)
- Stojković, Atanasije (1801). Фѵсіка: простымъ языкомъ списана за родъ Славенно-Сербскїй: Первая часть. Писмены Кралевскаго Унїверсїтета.
  - Вторая часть, 1802
  - Трета часть, 1803
- Stojković, Atanasije (1801). Арістідъ и Наталіа: Перва Частица. Писмены Кралевскаго Унїверсїтета.
- Сербскїй секретаръ или Руководство како сочинявати различнѣйша писма, Квїте, Облїгацїе, Контракте, Тестаменте, Реверсе, Конте и пр. Печатано писмены Кралевскаго Унїверсїтета. 1802.
- Стойковичъ, Аѳанасій (1807). О воздушныхъ камняхъ и ихъ произхожденіи. Харьковъ: Въ Университетской Типографіи.
- Stojković, Atanasije (1834). Новый завѣтъ Господа нашего Іисуса Христа. Въ Типографіи Карла Тахуница.

== See also ==
- Gligorije Trlajić
- Teodor Filipović
- Vasily Karazin
- Andrej Dudrovich
