= Comana, Giurgiu =

Comana
- Commune
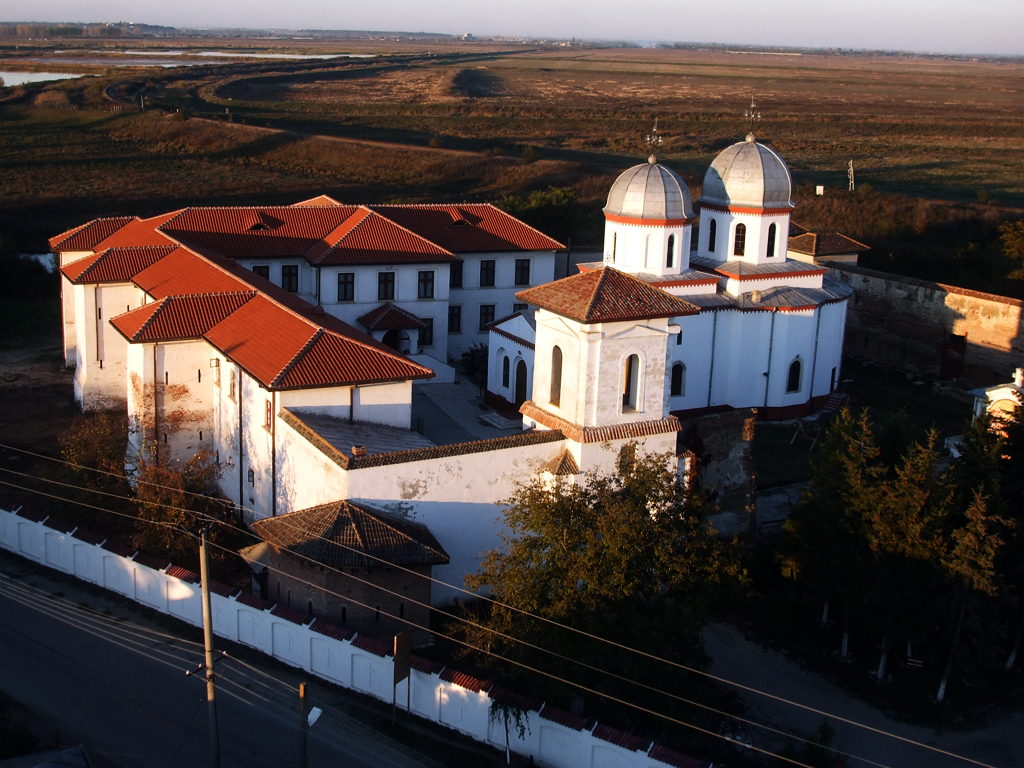
- Comana Monastery and surroundings

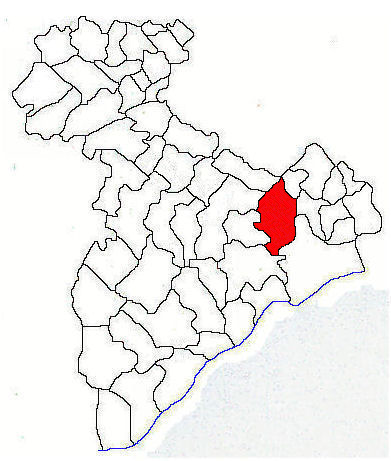
- Location in Giurgiu County

- Location in Romania
- Coordinates: 44°10′N 26°9′E
- Country: Romania
- County: Giurgiu

Government
  - Mayor (2024–2028): Aurel Florian Enache (PSD)
- Area: 102.97 km^{2} (39.76 sq mi)
- Elevation: 52 m (171 ft)
- Population (2021-12-01): 6,531
  - Density: 63.43/km^{2} (164.3/sq mi)
- Time zone: UTC+02:00 (EET)
  - Summer (DST): UTC+03:00 (EEST)
- Postal code: 87055
- Area code: +(40) 246
- Vehicle reg.: GR
- Website: primariecomana.ro

Comana is a commune in Giurgiu County, Muntenia, Romania. It is composed of five villages: Comana, Vlad Țepeș, Budeni, Falaștoaca, and Grădiștea. The commune is approximately 32 km (20 mi) south of Bucharest.

Comana Monastery is located in the commune, as is the Comana Nature Park, the largest protected area in southern Romania.

On the night of 6 to 7 of May 1944 a British bomber crash-landed at Comana. The aircrew were killed.

Historical population
Year	Pop.	±%
2002	7,832	—
2011	7,222	−7.8%
2021	6,531	−9.6%
Source: Census data

== Notable people ==
- Marian Munteanu (born 1962 in Grădiștea), leader of anti-government protests in 1990
- Eugen Nicolăescu (born 1955 in Grădiștea), economist and politician
- Gellu Naum (1915–2001), poet, writer, and translator, had a retreat at Comana
