= Aleksey Melissino =

Russian military commander

Aleksey Petrovich Melissino
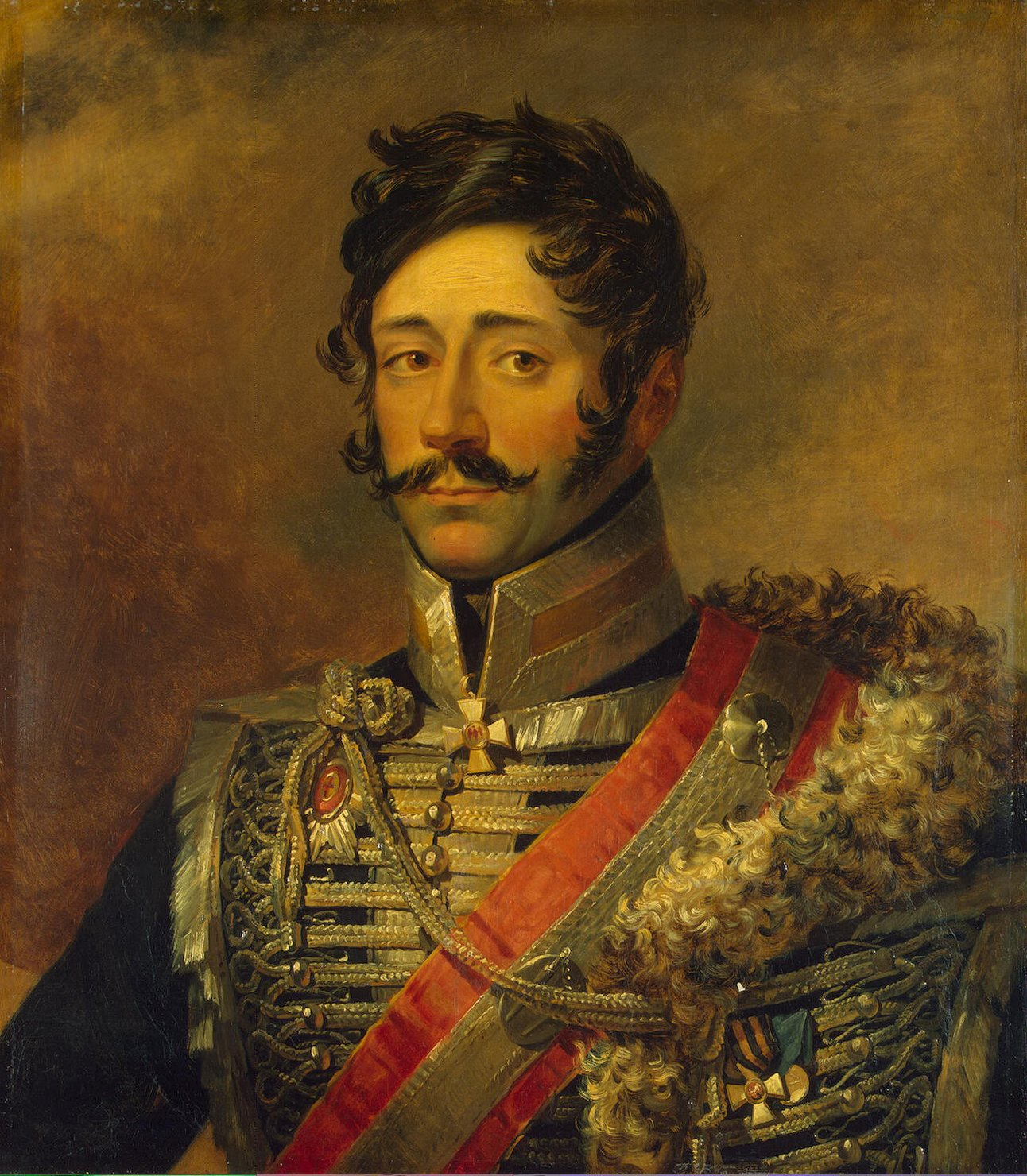
- Portrait of Melissino by George Dawe
- Native name: Алексей Петрович Мелиссино
- Born: 1759
- Died: August 15, 1813 (aged 54)
- Allegiance: Russian Empire
- Branch: Cavalry
- Service years: 1783–1813
- Rank: Major general
- Commands: 4th Hussar Mariupol Regiment, 8th Hussar Lubny Regiment
- Conflicts: Russo-Turkish War (1787–1792); French invasion of Russia
- Awards: Order of Saint Anna; Order of St. George; Order of the Red Eagle; Golden Weapon "For Bravery"

Aleksey Petrovich Melissino (Russian: Алексей Петрович Мелиссино; c. 1759–1813) was a Russian military commander during the Patriotic War of 1812, advancing to the rank of major general. He was the last of the Melissino family in Russia.

== Early life ==
He was the only son of artilleryman Pyotr Melissino (Greek: Πέτρος Μελισσηνός, translit. Petros Melissinos) and his wife Maria Dmitrievna, born Kotsareva (died in 1801). Immediately after birth, he enrolled in the Guards.

== Career ==
At age 16 (July 21, 1777) he began serving as a sergeant. In 1783, Melissino was promoted to captain of the artillery. In 1789 he was transferred to 1st Hussar Sumy Regiment with the rank of lieutenant colonel and took part in the Turkish War with the regiment. For distinction in the Siege of Izmail, on the proposal of Alexander Suvorov, he was awarded the Order of St. George 4th degree. When he was with the regiment in Novorossiya, Melissino laid the foundation for the horse plants in this region and oversaw the improvement of horse breeds, ordering horses from England, Turkey and Arabia.

In 1797, Colonel Melissino was dismissed from service, but in 1800 again enrolled in the Elisavetgrad Hussar Regiment. In 1801 he was promoted to major general with the appointment from the chief of the Mariupol Hussar Regiment. In 1807, Melissino was entrusted with the formation of the Lubny Hussar Regiment. After he was appointed chief of this regiment, he took part in the French invasion of Russia. On July 10, 1812, while commanding a separate detachment, he defeated Saxon General Reynier near the town of Yanov, for which he was awarded the Order of St. Anne of the 1st degree. On July 15, he captured an Austrian detachment of 2 thousand, with 8 guns and 4 banners in Kobryn. Then, in the forefront of Lieutenant General Baron Saken, Melissino participated in the battles of the Gornostaevichi and Vawkavysk. In 1813, he was in the rear of Miloradovich, covering the retreat of the Russian army from Lutzen to Dresden. During the Battle of Bautzen, Melissino was on the left flank and during the retreat of Russian army, he led the attack on French cuirassiers twice. On August 14, 1813 at Dresden, Melissino attacked the French Guards infantry and was killed at the head of his regiment, while bursting into the enemy's square.

== Personal life ==
His widow Roxanne Mikhailovna, nee Princess Cantacuzino (niece of Rodion Cantacuzino), undertook a search for her husband's body, but could not managed to find the body. She recovered his blood-soaked uniform, along with a saddle and bridle. In her stay in Puglyai (Goretsky Uyezd, Mogilev Governorate), she erected a monument to Melissino, under which the aforementioned uniform, trousers, saddle and bridle were kept inside a box. In the church of the village of Puglyai, before the revolution, orders by Melissino were kept in the tabernacle.

== Sources ==
- (in Russian) Alexander Podmazo - Dictionary of Russian generals, participants in military operations against the army of Napoleon Bonaparte in 1812-1815., TriTe studio, 1996, ISNN 0869-20011
