= Battle of Larga =

Part of the Russo-Turkish War (1768–1774)

Coordinates: 46.654016°N 29.245777°E

- Part of the Russo-Turkish War of 1768–1774
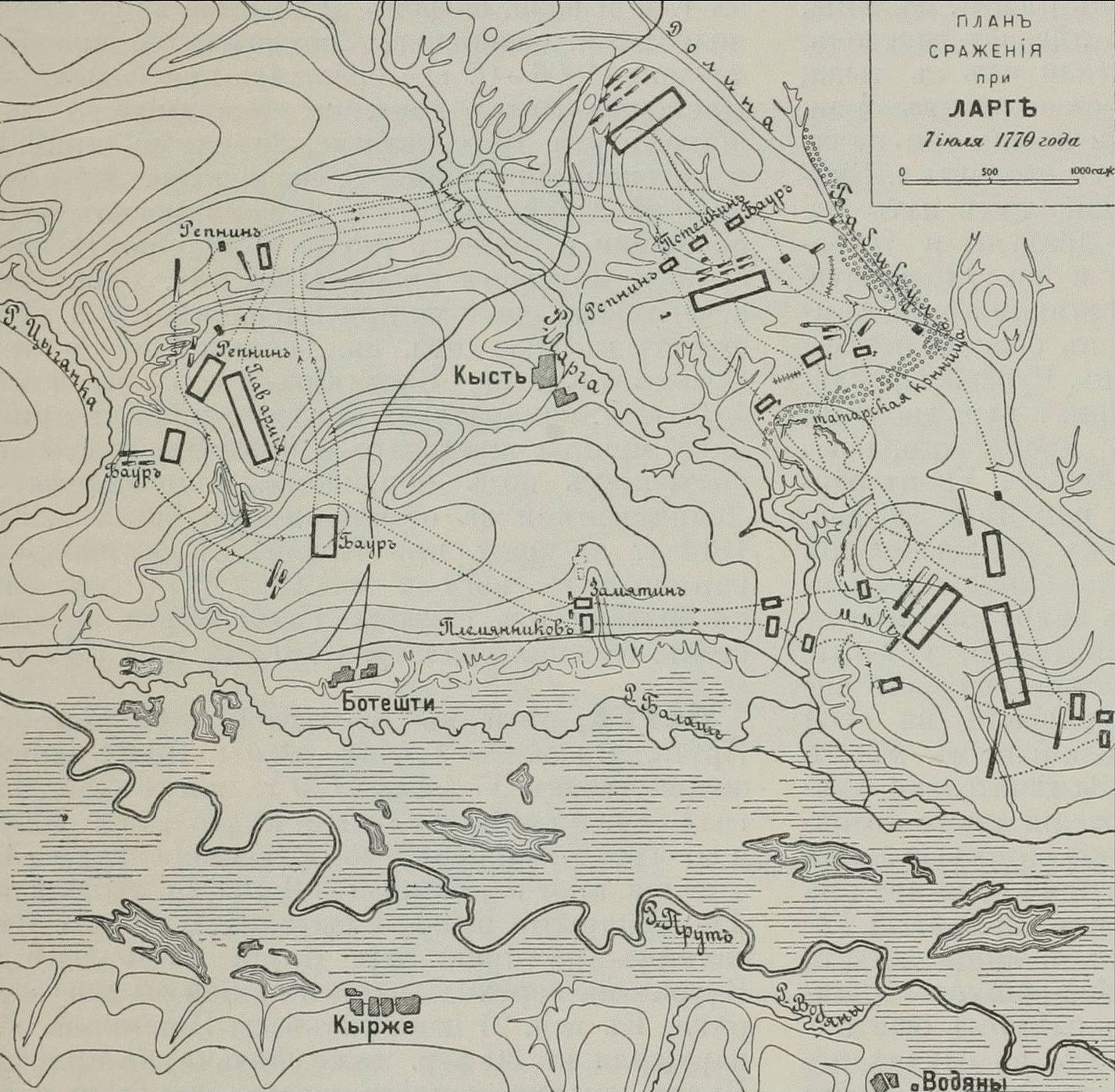
- Plan of the Battle of Larga
| Date | 18 July 1770 (Julian Calendar 7 July 1770) |
| Location | Near Larga River, eastern Moldavia (now Moldova) |
| Result | Russian victory |

Belligerents
| Russian Empire: • Zaporozhian Sich | Ottoman Empire: • Crimean Khanate |

Commanders and leaders
| (Russian Empire) Field-Marshal Rumyantsev | (Crimean Khanate) Qaplan II Giray |

Strength
| 38,000, 115 guns | 65,000 Tatars, 15,000 Ottomans, 33 guns |

Casualties and losses
| 29 dead, 61 wounded | 1,000 killed, 2,000 captured, 33 guns captured |

The Battle of (the) Larga was fought by a combined force of 65,000 Crimean Tatars and 15,000 Ottomans under Qaplan II Giray, against 38,000 Russians under Field-Marshal Rumyantsev on the banks of the Larga River, a tributary of the Prut River, in Moldavia (now in Moldova), for eight hours on 18 July 1770 (O.S. 7 July).

The battle was a decisive victory for the Russians who captured 33 Turkish cannons and the vast enemy camp. For this victory, Rumyantsev was awarded the Order of Saint George of the 1st degree. Two weeks later, the Russians scored an even greater victory in the Battle of Kagul.
