= Battle of Kagul =

1770 battle of the Russo-Turkish War (1768–1774)

Coordinates: 45°55′N 28°11′E

- Part of the Russo-Turkish War of 1768–1774
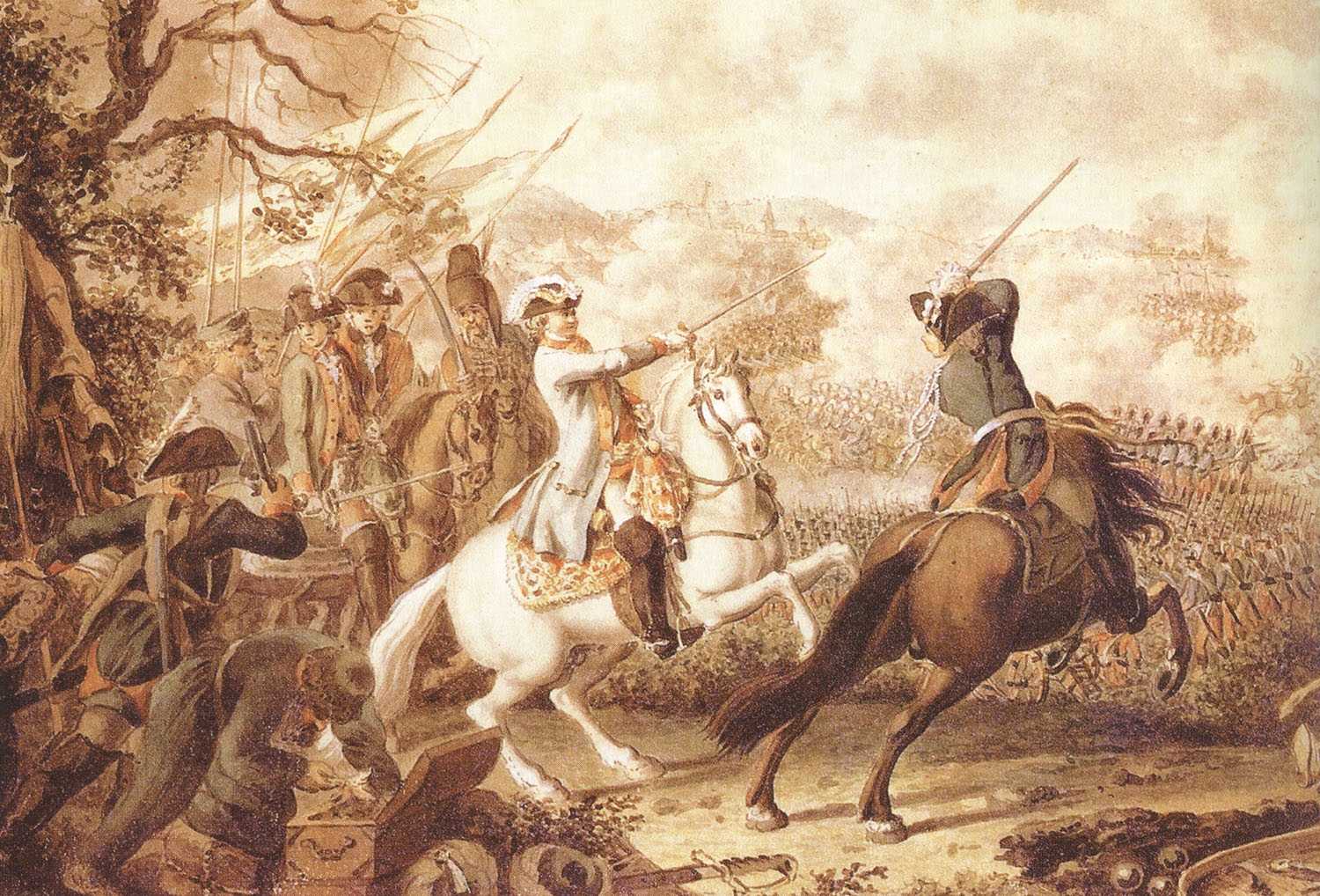
- Battle of Kagul, by Daniel Chodowiecki
Date	1 August 1770 (21 July at Julian Calendar)
Location	Kagul River near Vulcănești, Moldavia (present-day Moldova)
Result	Russian victory
Territorial changes	Russians temporarily take the Danube Delta from the Ottomans and occupy it until 1774.

Belligerents
Russian Empire; Zaporozhian Sich	Ottoman Empire; Crimean Khanate

Commanders and leaders
Pyotr Rumyantsev	(Ottoman Empire) Ivazzade Halil Pasha; Qaplan II Giray

Strength
Total: 35,000–42,000 men (Note: Estimates: • 35,000 • 42,000) and 255 cannons; 106 battalion guns; 149 field guns; Engaged; 17,000 infantrymen; "Several thousand" regular and irregular cavalry; Up to 118 guns; Covering force (against the Tatars): 11,000	Total: 130,000–230,000 men and 130–180 cannons (Note: Estimates vary from 130 to 180 guns.); Ottoman: 80,000–150,000 (Note: Estimates: • 80,000 • 100,000 • 150,000); 100,000 cavalry; 50,000 infantry; 130–180 cannons (Note: Estimates vary from 130 to 180 guns.); Crimean Tatar: 50,000–80,000 cavalry (Note: Estimates: • 50,000 • 80,000)

Casualties and losses
approx. 1,000–1,500 killed and wounded	20,000 killed and wounded 2,000 captured 140 guns

The Battle of Kagul or Cahul (Russian: Сражение при Кагуле, lit. 'Battle of the Kagul', Turkish: Kartal Ovası Muharebesi, lit. 'Battle of the Eagle Plain') occurred on 1 August 1770 (21 July 1770 in Julian Calendar) during the Russo-Turkish War of 1768–1774. It was the decisive and most important land battle of the war and one of the largest battles of the 18th century. It was fought in Moldavia, near the village of Frumoasa (now Cahul, Moldova), nearly a month after the Russian victory at Larga.

While the army of the Ottomans and its Crimean Tatar vassals greatly outnumbered the Russian force opposite them, the Russian commander, Field Marshal Pyotr Rumyantsev, deftly arranged his far smaller army in solid infantry squares and surprisingly chose to go on the offensive against the allied forces. Assisting it was the superb coordination and firing rapidity of the Russian artillery, which effectively neutralized the Ottoman artillery and largely negated the numerical superiority of the Ottoman army. The result was a decisive Russian victory.

== Background ==
The Russian empress Catherine II ordered the invasion of Moldavia and Wallachia, both of which were under Ottoman suzerainty, in September 1769 as a response to the Ottoman sultan Mustafa III's declaration of war against Russia the previous year. Leading the invasion endeavor was Field Marshal Pyotr Rumyantsev. Although the Ottoman forces, joined by Crimean Tatars' forces from the east, had greater numerical superiority over the Russian forces, it was evident that they were buckling under the speed and shock of the Russian invasion, retreating after suffering losses from battles and sieges while their fortresses were falling one by one. The Ottoman sultan did not expect such a calamity to happen, but this shocked the Grand Vizier Ivazzade Halil Pasha even more that he had lost oversight of the overall situation in the theater and thus let the initiative pass to the enemy for the time being. To make matters worse, after the battle at Larga, the Ottomans and Crimean Tatars retreated in two different and distant directions which made assistance to each other for the next battle nearly impossible: the Tatars retreated in the direction of Izmail and Kilia, while the Ottomans retreated towards the village of Frumoasa, now called Cahul, near the Kagul River. The Turkish troops, positioned on the heights of the Cahul River's left bank in a fortified camp east of the village of Vulcănești, were preparing to launch a frontal attack on the Russian army.

Despite losing the engagement at Larga and the fact that nearly all of Wallachia and Bessarabia was now in Russian hands, Ivazzade Halil Pasha believed that retaking the initiative from the Russians was still possible. It only helped convince him such when the Crimean khan Qaplan II Giray sent him Russian prisoners whom the Ottomans thoroughly interrogated. The Grand Vizier found out that the smaller Russian army was nearing the end of its campaign capability, with its food supplies and ammunition stocks nearing depletion. It was then he decided that he had to order a grand counterattack against the Russian force forcing its way across the riverine region of southeastern Moldavia. At that end, the Grand Vizier rushed back to the Ottoman capital Constantinople to discuss matters with the Sultan and other Ottoman commanders involved, thus starting an emergency council of war which lasted several days. After some time in preparation and deliberation, the Grand Vizier returned to the theater and managed to reinforce his army, which had been gravely depleted after several crushing battlefield defeats. He gathered a sizeable army, estimated at between 100,000 to 150,000 men gathered from all parts of the empire at his disposal by mid-July, gathering them in an area between Braila and Isaccea.

== Prelude ==
The Ottoman army, consisting of 100,000 cavalry and 50,000 infantry men sporting different units and ethnicities gathered from all parts of the empire including the elite Janissary corps, began crossing the Danube northward once more by 31 July. A wide pontoon bridge some 1,750 cubits (800 meters) long consisting of 62 wooden vessels was built across the Danube to expedite the river crossing, despite the fact that the river was swollen by heavy floods and rains, the heaviest in 80 years, making the bridgeheads unstable and partially submerged in some places. This led to the protests of Suleiman Agha, the commander of the Janissary corps, that such a move, especially a crossing made haphazard by the hastiness of the operation and hampered by adverse weather conditions, would prove disastrous at the event of withdrawal; however, this was disregarded by Ottoman Grand Vizier Ivazzade Halil Pasha who purposed that their army was three to four times larger than the exhausted Russian force facing them to the north and that victory was assured. Suleiman Agha was then subsequently dismissed for cowardice and replaced with Zargarcı Mehmed Agha as the commander of the Janissary corps.

The crossing of the Danube was completed in late afternoon and the Ottoman army set up its encampment and fortifications east of Vulcănești. After assigning the subordinates to their respective positions, Halil Pasha promised to the army that there would be no defeat by the Russians this time, and likewise the army and their commanders responded that there would be no backing down on the effort at winning the battle no matter the cost. He tasked the Crimean Tatar army of 80,000 cavalry under the command of Qaplan Giray only 20 kilometres (12 mi) from his position in the vicinity of Lake Yalpuh to the southeast, to raid the fragile and outstretched Russian supply lines then strike at the rear of the main Russian army. The Ottoman army then assumed their positions in the anticipation that they will march north to meet the Russian army.

The smaller Russian force of about 40,000 led by Field Marshal Rumyantsev was marching through the town of Cahul, with the recently established Ottoman camp and fortifications only 7 miles (11 km) away due south near Vulcănești. The Russian force arrived on a location on the right bank of the river and thus encamped by 31 July (20 July on Russian calendar), the same day the Ottomans just completed their river crossing of the Danube. Despite numerous victories in the field, Rumyantsev became cautious as he found through scouts and reconnaissance that the Ottoman army built up its numbers, dangerously outnumbering his own force. Moreover, the terrain was advantageous to the Ottomans since apart from the battlefield marked by the river to the west and numerous small lakes and marshes to the east which limited the mobility of the Russian army, it also contained two valleys which allowed the numerous Ottoman and Tatar cavalry to attack the Russian rear. Therefore, he decided that he had to march rapidly towards the main Ottoman army to prevent them from uniting with the Crimean Tatar force nearby and force a battle with the former immediately lest the situation for him and the Russian army worsens. Although the Ottoman army was undoubtedly the far larger and better equipped one compared to the medieval-style Crimean Tatar force, it was also the nearest for the Russians within the nearest marching distance to engage as to not aggravate the already worsening supply situation which he tried so hard to resolve by issuing 10-days worth of thriftily chosen rations to each soldier after resupplying shortly after the Larga battle. He therefore had to neglect his own supply lines which would be vulnerable to Tatar raids anyway, assigning part of his force to protect it, but at the same time he already provided provisions and supplies to his men up into the coming battle. Therefore, he divided his already outnumbered force to maximize his resources and supplies; to this end, he handpicked 17,000 men that he can personally lead against the Ottoman army, while 6,000 men were redeployed to protect the fragile Russian supply lines to the north, and 11,000 men assigned as a covering force to protect the Russian rear against a potential attack by the Crimean Tatar cavalry.

== Battle ==
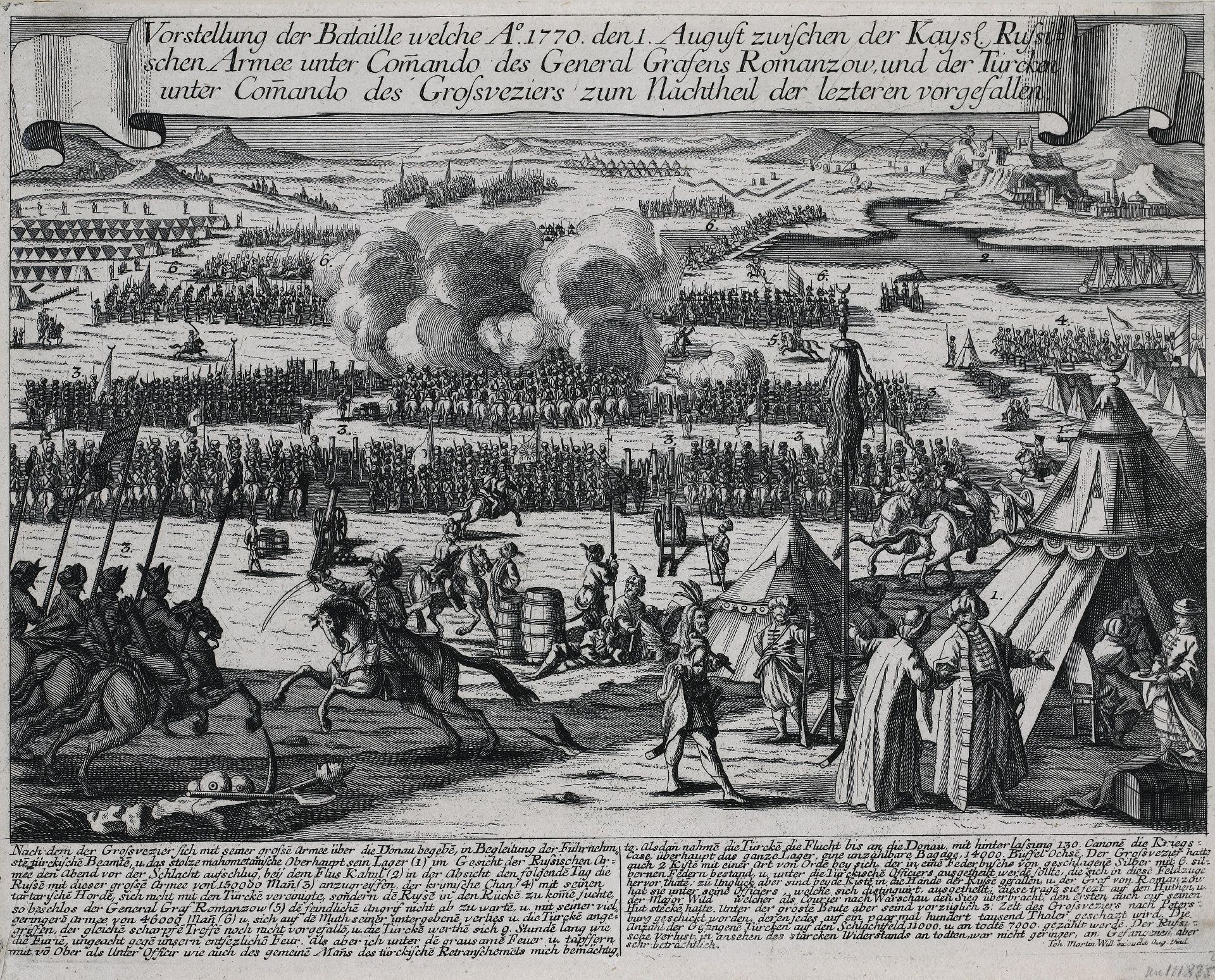
Johann Martin Will. Battle of Kagul

Ivazzade Pasha and his staff witnessed the march of the Russian force, and after doing a reconnaissance on the Russian positions, decided that he would launch his attack the next day at precisely 10 a.m., two hours before noon. However, this plan was already hours late compared to Rumyantsev's plan: the Russian force planned to launch its offensive at the Kagul River by 1 a.m. — only an hour after midnight, with 17,000 infantrymen deployed in squares with sharpshooters defending their flanks as they would have to fight their way against superior numbers of the enemy especially their cavalry, while the rest have to be put in reserve in case things went against the plan. With this chronological discrepancy in the plans of commanders of both sides, the Russians were sure to achieve the element of surprise against the enemy the moment they launched their attack.

The attacks on the Ottoman left flank were inflicted by infantry squares of Quartermaster General F. W. Bauer and General-Lieutenant P. G. Plemyannikov; from the front — the square of General-in-Chief P. I. Olits, and on the Turkish right flank — squares of General-Lieutenant J. Bruce and General-Lieutenant N. V. Repnin. P. A. Rumyantsev himself was attached to Olits' division. The reserve consisted of: heavy cavalry of General-Lieutenant I. P. Saltykov and General-Major V. V. Dolgorukov (a total of 3,500 sabres), as well as artillery in the brigade of General-Major P. I. Melissino.

When the Ottomans, still on the midst of their preparation on their albeit-late offensive that is not to take place, saw the Russian force on infantry squares marching towards them in 6 columns, which left the Greceni camp and formed up for battle in 5 separate squares, with a small reserve. Early in the morning, they commenced a grand yet disorganized cavalry charge all across the entire length of the battle line. But the Russians backed their infantry squares with light artillery inside the squares which only fired when the soldiers opened lanes to make way for its line of fire. The cavalry was placed at intervals between and behind the squares. The said cannons fired grapeshots to the Ottoman cavalry, inflicting seriously crippling losses to the attackers and were thus driven back with only relatively few remaining to report to their commanders, and thus the Russians continued their fighting march. The Ottomans then tried to flank the Russian force to the rear, but Rumyantsev hurried his reserves to go towards the entrenchments situated between the marching Russian soldiers and the Ottoman camp thus redirecting the attention of the enemy flanking force on his rear. Fearing to lose his line of retreat, Ivazzade Pasha rushed all available Ottoman units to the entrenchments, only to be torn apart and driven out by constant, devastating and accurate fire of the Russian artillery.

The Crimean Tatar light cavalry led by Qaplan Giray himself galloped from their camp from Lake Yalpuh, resuming their raids on Russian supply lines north of the battlefield, but were prevented from striking the Russian rear by the presence of the 11,000 strong task force Rumyantsev assigned earlier to cover their rear. Owing to the crudeness and weakness of their weaponry and armor, they were unable to attack the Russian task force and were thus prevented from joining and coordinating their attacks with the Ottomans, proving their presence or their greater numbers inconsequential during the entire battle and allowing the main Russian army under Rumyantsev himself to continue advancing southward against the main Ottoman army in Kagul.

As the Russian forces finally arrived and stormed its way to the Ottoman camp by 8 a.m., they finally felt the sheer weight of the massive Ottoman numbers, with huge throngs of elite Janissaries, roughly 10,000 men in all, as well as other infantry trying to inch its way to the gaps in the Russian infantry squares thereby seriously jeopardizing Rumyantsev's attack. They broke into the square battle order of Generals Plemyannikov and Olits and disrupted it. Rumyantsev brought reserves into battle and pushed the Janissaries back to their original position. General Bauer's troops captured enemy positions and 93 guns on the left flank, and General Bruce's division captured the right flank Turkish fortifications. At this time General Repnin's troops reached the heights south of the enemy camp and opened a rifle and artillery fire on it from the rear. When the massed battery line commanded by Pyotr Melissino, the future General of the Artillery, opened fire in a massive barrage, the Ottoman forces began taking even more casualties and thus were forced back while demoralized.

The Ottoman army finally began its disorganized retreat under pressure from continuous Russian assault. Ivazzade Pasha could not manage to stop the retreat despite even going as far as evoking the names of Muhammad and the present Sultan to implore his troops, failing to do so as the retreating Ottomans complained of the devastating Russian firepower as if it was striking like lightning. A detachment composed of Albanian and Lazi contingents in the right flank of the Ottoman army counterattacked in disorder only to flee similarly disordered by Russian musketry and bayonets. The Ottoman rear led by the beylerbey Mustafa Pasha was hesitant to engage the Russians, and when the commanders began punishing deserters and stragglers through mutilation, they became even more hesitant and unwilling to join the fight. The routing Ottomans went through a detachment of Anatolian Kurdish cavalrymen supposedly on its way to assist Ivazzade Pasha, but the detachment instead looted whatever belongings the soldiers on flight carried with them, therefore adding to the chaos the Ottoman army was already in. He had no choice but to join along with whatever was left of his staff in the disorganized retreat. Seeing the Ottomans already fleeing from the battle scene and already exhausted from several hours of non-stop battle, the Russian infantry halted and took a respite on the former Ottoman camp in the deserted tents, while Rumyantsev instead ordered the Russian army's 1,000-strong cavalry detachment to chase the retreating Ottoman force, which they did as far away as 5 kilometres (3.1 mi) and killing many along the way before stopping in the afternoon the same day.

== Conclusion ==
The tragedy of the unfortunate Ottoman force did not end at the disaster at Kagul. The next day in 2 August, Rumyantsev sent a corps to chase the retreating Ottoman army on its way to board the 300 ships at the Danube River ready to take the army home. The Russian corps eventually caught up with the already broken enemy force, initiating yet another engagement in which the Russians yet again inflicted heavy losses on the Ottomans and effectively dispersed and scattered what was left of their army which were now fleeing in all directions except north, with many trying to swim across the Danube to escape the Russian onslaught only to die drowning. The Russians managed to capture the entire 300-ship Ottoman convoy and 30 cannons, therefore completing the defeat of the Ottomans and their triumph at Kagul.

The Ottoman army suffered around 3,000 killed during the battle itself, while many more drowned in the chaotic retreat toward the Danube. In total, the Ottoman army suffered more than 20,000 killed, wounded, and missing or taken prisoner strewn along the battlefield of Kagul and along a 10-kilometre (6.2 mi)-trail from the battlefield to the Danube. The Russian army suffered far fewer losses, at about 1,000 killed and wounded. The Russians also managed to capture all off the Ottoman army's artillery pieces, 130 guns in total including the 30 guns captured near the northern Danube riverbank.

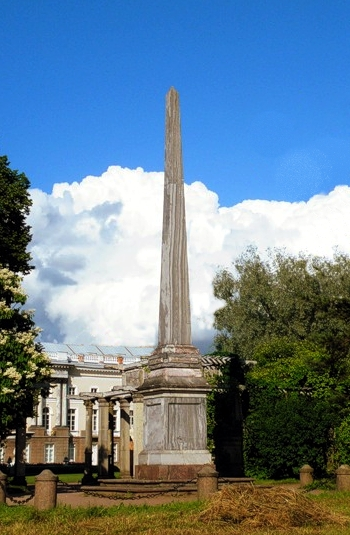
The Kagul Obelisk in Tsarskoye Selo

By 5 August, the shattered remnants of the Ottoman army was thrown back to the southern back of the Danube.

Hearing of the disaster at the Kagul River, the Crimean khan Qaplan II Giray joined by thousands of other Ottoman stragglers withdrew back to the city of Izmail out of fear of facing the smaller yet seemingly unstoppable Russian force, but the locals of the city were wary of the Tatars' presence in the city, owing to their fear that the invading Russians would give them reprisals for allowing the Tatars to enter their city. The huge yet disheartened Tatar army along with the Crimean Khan instead retreated all the way back to Ackerman (Akkerman; now Bilhorod-Dnistrovskyi) located on the Crimean homeland by ships.

== Aftermath ==
In the wake of the victory at Kagul, with the Ottoman military presence in the Danube Delta region rendered null, the Russians overran all major fortresses in the region — Izmail, Kilia, Ackerman, İbrail (now Brăila), İsakça (now Isaccea), and Bender, all taken with minor difficulties.

In commemoration of the victory, the empress Catherine II ordered the Cahul Obelisk to be erected in Tsarskoe Selo, while Frederick II of Prussia sent to Rumyantsev a congratulatory letter in which he compared the Russian victory to the deeds of the Ancient Romans. Meanwhile, the Ottoman sultan Mustafa III removed Ivazzade Halil Pasha from his post as the Grand Vizier as a result of this defeat and was replaced by Silahdar Mehmed Pasha.

On the same day four years later, the Russian and Ottoman empires signed the Treaty of Küçük Kaynarca, ending the war.

Russia's victory in the Battle of Kagul opened the way to the Danube for its troops and was a testament to the commanding skills of P. A. Rumyantsev, who applied his main principle of breaking the enemy by offensive actions.

A monument dedicated to the battle was erected in Vulcănești in around 1849, designed by the Italian architect Francesco Boffo.

== See also ==
- Battle of Vaslui
- Battle of Zenta
- Battle of Rymnik

== Sources ==
- Bodart, Gaston (1908). Militär-historisches Kriegs-Lexikon (1618-1905) (in German).
- Bogdanovich, Modest Ivanovich (1852). Походы Румянцева, Потемкина и Суворова в Турции. Saint Petersburg: Типография Эдуарда Веймара.
- Koryshko, V. I. (2016). "КАГУЛЬСКОЕ СРАЖЕНИЕ 1770". Great Russian Encyclopedia. Electronic version.
- Aktepe, Munir (1980). Şem'dânî-zâde Fındıklılı Süleyman Efendi Târihi Mür'i't-Tevârîh. Vol. II/B.
- Zisserman, A. L. (1877). Военно-исторические очерки. Гл. IX. Vol. 130. ISBN 9780803244238.
- Petrov, Andrey (1866). Война России с Турцией и польскими конфедератами, с 1769-1774 год. Vol. I.
