= Comana Monastery =

Heritage site in Giurgiu County, Romania

- Mănăstirea Comana
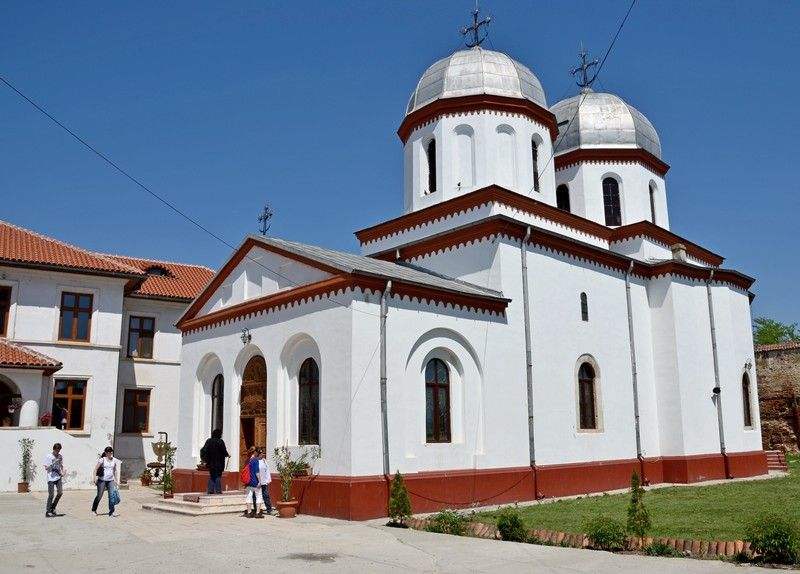
- Comana Monastery church

- Location within Romania
- Interactive map of Comana Monastery

Monastery information
- Denomination: Romanian Orthodox
- Established: 1461

People
- Founder: Vlad Țepeș

Architecture
- Completion date: 1608

Site
- Location: 392 Radu Șerban Street, Comana, Giurgiu
- Country: Romania
- Coordinates: 44.176824°N 26.143042°E
- Public access: yes
- Website: episcopiagiurgiului.ro/manastiri/manastirea-comana/

Comana Monastery (Romanian: Mănăstirea Comana) is a Romanian Orthodox monastery in Comana, Giurgiu County, Romania.

The original Comana Monastery was founded in 1461. It was built by Vlad Țepeș (Vlad the Impaler) as a monastery-fortress. Having fallen into disrepair, the original monastery was completely demolished and rebuilt in 1589 by Radu Șerban, future prince of Wallachia. Measuring 61 m × 56 m (200 ft × 184 ft), the new monastery was fortified with defensive walls and five towers. It was restored between 1699 and 1703 by Șerban Cantacuzino and again during the 18th and 19th centuries.

In 1861, the foundation of the original monastery built by Vlad Țepeș was rediscovered by Ioan Brezoianu.

During archeological work performed in the 1970s, a headless body, which may be that of Vlad Țepeș was discovered on the grounds of the current monastery. Historian Constantin Rezachevici and others believe that he may have been buried here, near the battlefield where he was killed.
