= Albanians in Romania =

Ethnic group in Romania

Shqiptarët e Rumanisë

Total population
- 645 (2021 census); 10,000 (estimate)

Languages
- Albanian, Romanian

Religion
- Islam, Albanian Orthodox, Catholic

Related ethnic groups
- Albanians

Albanians in Romania (Albanian: Shqiptarët e Rumanisë; Romanian: Albanezii din România) are an officially recognized ethnic minority, with one seat reserved in the Romanian Chamber of Deputies to the League of Albanians of Romania (Liga Albanezilor din România).

== Name ==
Albanians are called by Romanians today Albanezi, but in the past they were known as Arbănași, the old ethnonym dating back to the Middle Ages.

== History ==
=== Early settlement ===
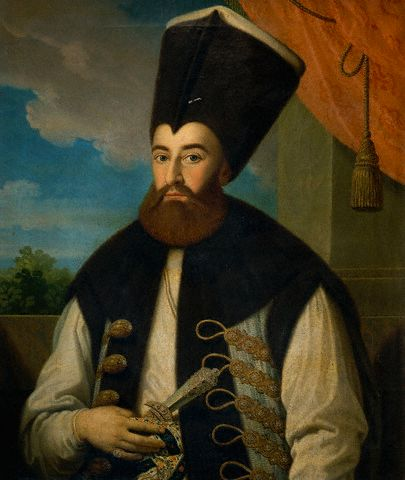
Grigore IV Ghica, Prince of Wallachia (1822–1828)

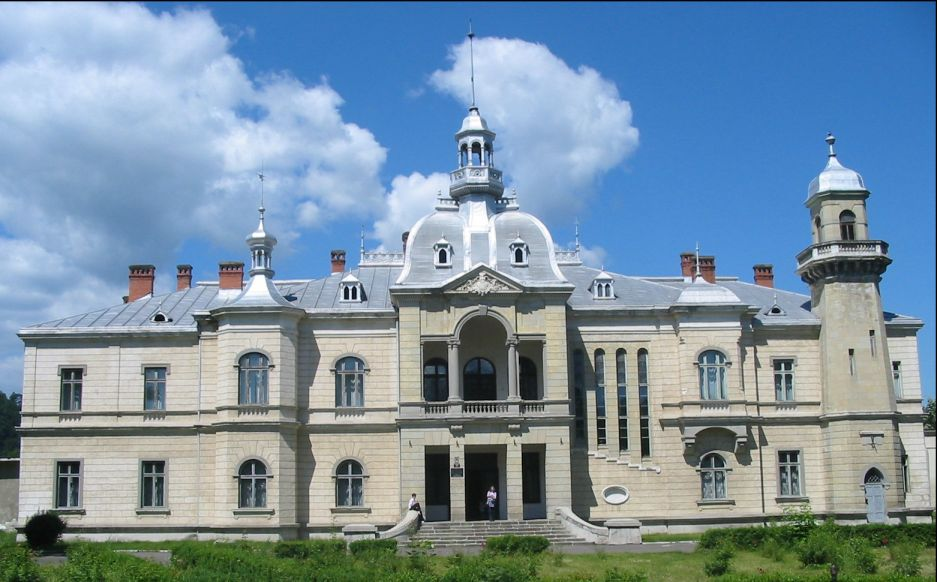
The Ghica Palace in Comăneşti

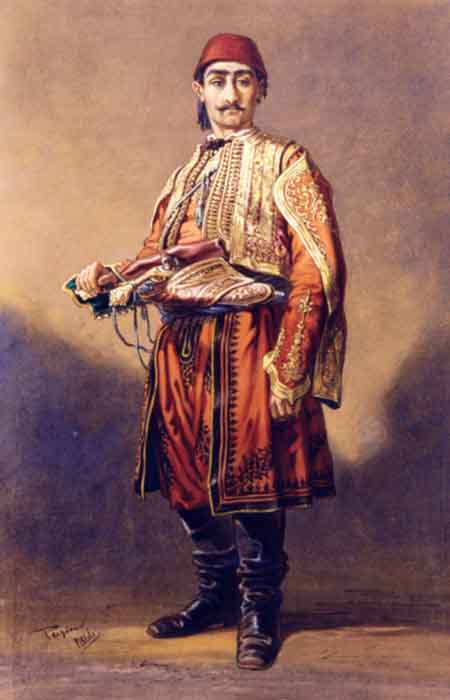
An Albanian in Wallachia (1866 watercolor by Amadeo Preziosi)

An Albanian community inside the Danubian Principalities was first attested in Wallachia under Prince Michael the Brave: a report drafted by Habsburg authorities in Transylvania specified that 15,000 Albanians had been allowed to cross north of the Danube in 1595; Călinești (a village in present-day Florești, Prahova County) was one of their places of settlement, as evidenced in a document issued by Michael's rival and successor, Simion Movilă, who confirmed their right to reside in the locality. The community's presence was first recorded in Bucharest around 1628. Early Albanian settlers in Romania supported Mihai the Brave and saw Wallachia as a place of refuge from Ottoman control. In his return after raids in Ottoman Bulgaria, Mihai's forces were followed by Albanians who lived on the shores of the Danube, particularly in Ruse. One the early Albanian figures in the Wallachian court was Leca of Cătun, postelnic of Wallachia and military commander the armies of several Wallachian princes.

These Albanians came directly from Albania and the western Balkans or more frequently from older Albanian settlements in Bulgaria. In the late 16th and 17th century, representatives of these groups in Romania were figures like Leca of Cătun and later Vasile Lupu. The most prominent family of Albanian emigres in Romania were the Ghica (Albanian: Gjika) The first recorded Ghica in historical records is Gheorghe Ghica. His family originally came from Albania and the wider region of Epirus and was possibly born in North Macedonia, south of the city of Skopje, in Köprülü (present-day Veles). Köprülü as his birthplace may be a later mistake based on Ion Neculce's literary narrative about his ties to Köprülü Mehmed Pasha. Mihai Cantacuzino in the 18th century place his geographical origin from the Albanians of Zagora, in the region of Ianina. In all available historical sources, despite the discrepancies about his exact birthplace, he is always referred to as an Albanian, an indication of his origin's role in the patronage networks which supported his political career. His father's name is unknown but Alexandru Ghica, a descendant of Gheorghe Ghica, suggested that his name was Matei (c. 1565–1620). This figure hasn't been recorded in archival material and his existence is disputed. Gheorghe Ghica was engaged in commerce in Constantinople and traveled as a merchant to Iași in the Romanian principalities. Ghica quickly moved upwards in the Romanian principalities mainly because he supported and was supported by other Albanians in the central and regional Ottoman administration. Ghica joined Vasile Lupu, an Albanian emigre who was Voivode of Moldavia and became his most trusted officer and representative in the Ottoman court. Miron Costin (1633-1691), a contemporary Romanian historian wrote about the clientelist relations in Ottoman hierarchy between figures of the same origin and noted that being of the same origin as him [Ghica] – that is Albanian – voievode Vasile brought him to the court and entrusted him some minor offices, and later [Ghica] reached the position of the Chief Judge of Lower Moldavia. Lupu's fall brought Ghica to an alliance with another Albanian, the Grand Vizier of the Ottoman Empire, Köprülü Mehmed Pasha. In the Romanian principalities, Mehmed Pasha promoted an 'ethnicity-based patronage system' and chose to appoint Albanians as a means to strengthen his apparatus in the region. Gheorghe Ghica (voivode of Moldavia (1658–59), voivode of Wallachia (1859-1860)), his son Grigore (voivode of Wallachia, 1660–64), and Vasile Lupu's son, Ștefăniță Lupu (voivode of Moldavia, 1659–61) all were appointed by Köprülü Mehmed Pasha. Ion Neculce (1672-1745), another contemporary Romanian historian who continued the tradition of Constin recorded a tale about George Ghica and Mehmed Pasha. According to the tale, they came from poor families and had met when they were children in Constantinople. The future Mehmed Pasha promised that he would help Ghica when he became powerful. Years later when they met again Mehmed Pasha supposedly remembered their meeting and made Ghica, voivode of Moldavia. The tale is definitely a literary construction, but it has historical value because its narration highlights the existing patronage ties of its era. Ghica married Smaragda (Smada) Lână, daughter of Stamate Lână, the Stolnic (Seneschal) of Broşteni. Ghica rooted his family in the feudal class of Romania via the marriage of his son Grigore I to the niece of Gheorghe Ștefan.

Grigore I Ghica's rule was also not free from disturbances due to the conflict with the Sublime Porte and especially because of the disputes between the Boyar parties. Through his political maneuvers and the assassination of his former mentor Constantine Cantacuzino, he instigated the hatred of nobility against him and his entourage. Taking advantage of the defeat of the Ottomans at the Battle of Levice (1664), Grigore fled to Poland and then to Vienna, in search of Habsburg military aid. His hopes having not been materialized, he returned to Constantinople and acquired the Moldavian throne once again in 1672. During his short second reign, the animosity of the Cantacuzinos exploded violently, and after the defeat of the Turks at Khotyn in 1673, Grigore was forced to flee to Constantinople; the hostility of his opponents lost his throne and he will die in Constantinople in 1674. Grigore I Ghica's children, most notably Matei (Grigore) Ghica, assured the continuation of the lineage. Matei Ghica lived exclusively in Greek Phanar neighborhood of Constantinople. The marriage with Ruxandra Mavrocordatos, daughter of Alexander Mavrocordatos, the Dragoman of the Sublime Porte, introduced Matei to the Phanariote nucleus — now the religious, cultural and political hegemons of the Christian Ottoman subjects and vassals — and ensured a path of political ascendancy for his descendants. He became Dragoman of the Fleet, and in 1739 he negotiated an agreement with the Sultan whereby the key position of Grand Dragoman of the Sublime Porte would remain within the fold — i.e. among the descendants of a family pact involving the Ghicas, Mavrocordatos and Racoviţăs. His son Grigore II Ghica, well versed in the intricacies of the Ottoman politics due to his rank as Dragoman, succeeded in acquiring the Moldavian throne on 26 September 1726.

=== 19th century ===
The Albanian community was strengthened during the Phanariote epoch, when numerous immigrants opened businesses in a large number of cities and towns, and were employed as bodyguards of Wallachian princes and boyars (being usually recorded as Arbănași, akin to Arvanites, and its variant Arnăuți, borrowed from the Turkish Arnavut). In 1820, a survey indicated that there were 90 traders from the Rumelian town of Arnaut Kioy present in the Wallachian capital, most of whom were probably Albanians and Aromanians.

The Rilindja Kombëtare movement of Albanian nationalism inside the Ottoman Empire was present and prolific in Wallachia, the center of cultural initiatives taken by Dora d'Istria, Naim Frashëri, Jani Vreto, and Naum Veqilharxhi (the latter published the first ever Albanian primer in Bucharest, in 1844). Aleksandër Stavre Drenova, a resident of Bucharest, authored the lyrics of Albania's national anthem, Hymni i Flamurit, which is sung to the tune of "Pe-al nostru steag e scris Unire", composed by the Romanian Ciprian Porumbescu. At the time, Albanians were present, alongside other Balkan communities, in Bucharest's commercial life, where many worked as street vendors (specializing in the sale of soft drinks or confectionery items).

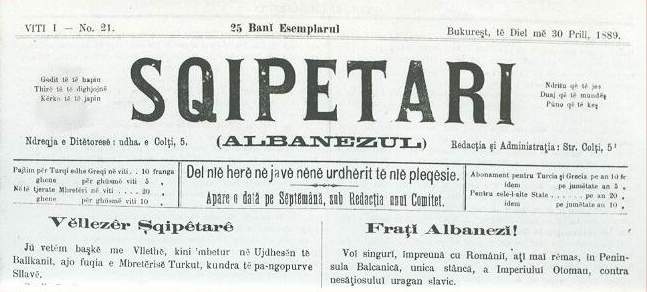
The newspaper Sqipetari/Albanezul, published by the Albanian community (1889)

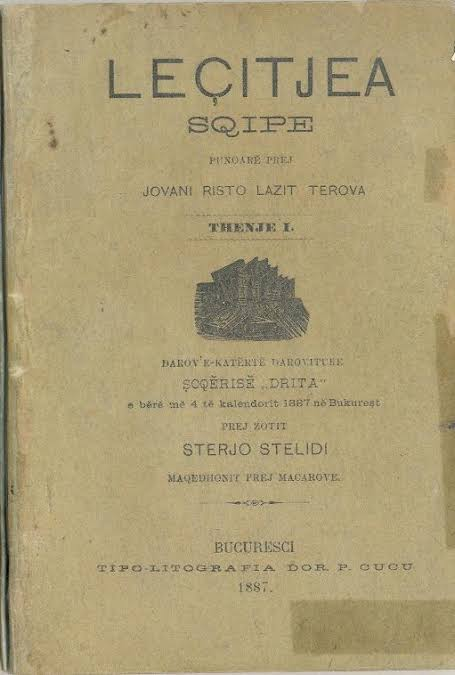
Albanian schoolbook printed in Bucharest in 1887

Among the new groups of immigrants from various Balkan regions to Romania were the families of poets Victor Eftimiu and Lasgush Poradeci. At the time, the independence movement gathered momentum, and, for a while after 1905, was focused on the activities of Albert Gjika. An Albanian school was opened in 1905 in the city of Constanța — among its pupils was poet Aleksandër Stavre Drenova. In 1912, at a Bucharest meeting headed by Ismail Qemali and attended by Drenova, the first resolution regarding Albania's independence was adopted.

In 1893, the Albanian community in Romania numbered around 30,000 persons. In 1920 almost 20,000 Albanians lived in Bucharest. A new wave of Albanian immigrants, many of them Muslims from Yugoslavia, followed in the wake of World War I. In 1921, the first translation of the Qur'an into Albanian was completed by Ilo Mitkë Qafëzezi and published in the city of Ploiești. Many Albanians settled in Transylvania, where they generally established confectionery enterprises.

The community was repressed under the communist regime, starting in 1953 (when the Albanian cultural association was closed down). Rights lost were regained after the Romanian Revolution of 1989, but the number of people declaring themselves Albanian has decreased dramatically between 1920 and 2002. Traditionally, members of the community have been included among a special "among others" category in the censuses.

The community gained a seat in the Chamber of Deputies in 1996 when the Cultural Union of Albanians of Romania entered Parliament. In 2000 the community's seat was taken by the League of Albanians of Romania, who have held it since.

== Demographics ==
In the 2002 census 520 Romanian citizens indicated their ethnicity was Albanian, and 484 stated that their native language was Albanian. The actual number of the Albanian population in Romania is unofficially estimated at 10,000 persons. Most members of the community live in Bucharest, while the rest mainly live in larger urban centers such as Timișoara, Iași, Constanța and Cluj-Napoca.

Most families are Orthodox and trace their origins to the area around Korçë. The other Romanian Albanians adhere to Islam.

== Notable people ==
The following is a list of notable individuals of Albanian ancestry in what is today Romania. Note that many of these may not be full ethnic Albanians, but only have partial Albanian descent.

=== Prime Ministers ===
- Dimitrie Ghica – He served as prime minister between 1868 and 1870, was a Romanian politician, and a prominent member of the Conservative Party.

=== Princes of Wallachia ===
- George Ghica – Founder of the Ghica family, was Prince of Moldavia in 1658–1659 and Prince of Wallachia in 1659–1660.
- Grigore I Ghica – Prince of Wallachia between September 1660 and December 1664 and again between March 1672 and November 1673.
- Grigore II Ghica – Voivode (Prince) of Moldavia at four different intervals.
- Matei Ghica – Prince of Wallachia between 11 September 1752 and 22 June 1753.
- Scarlat Ghica – Prince of Moldavia (2 March 1757 – 7 August 1758), and twice Prince of Wallachia (August 1758 – 5 June 1761; 18 August 1765 – 2 December 1766).
- Alexandru Ghica – Voivode (Prince) of Wallachia from December 1766 to October 1768.
- Grigore III Ghica – Prince of Moldavia between 29 March 1764 – 3 February 1767 and September 1774 – 10 October 1777 and of Wallachia: 28 October 1768 – November 1769.
- Grigore IV Ghica – Prince of Wallachia between 1822 and 1828.
- Alexandru II Ghica – Prince of Wallachia from April 1834 to 7 October 1842.

=== Princes of Moldavia ===
- Vasile Lupu – Voivode of Moldavia between 1634 and 1653.

=== Politics ===
- Bonifaciu Florescu – Romanian polygraph, the illegitimate son of writer-revolutionary Nicolae Bălcescu.
- Dimitrie Ghica-Comănești – Romanian nobleman, explorer, famous hunter, adventurer and politician.
- Pantazi Ghica – Wallachian, later Romanian politician and lawyer.
- Albert Ghica – Albanian-Romanian writer and socialite.
- Alexandrina Cantacuzino - Romanian political activist, philanthropist and diplomat, one of her country's leading feminists in the 1920s and '30s.
- Dimitrie Ghica – Romanian politician.
- Vladimir Ghika – Romanian diplomat
- Ioan Grigore Ghica – Romanian politician who served as the Minister of Foreign Affairs of Principality of Romania

=== Military ===
- Leca of Cătun, military commander and postelnic of Wallachia in the 17th century.
- Matila Ghyka – Romanian Naval officer, novelist, mathematician, historian, philosopher, diplomat and Plenipotentiary Minister in the United Kingdom during the late 1930s and until 1940.

=== Arts and entertainment ===
- Kristaq Antoniu – Romanian operetta tenor, baritone, and actor.
- Victor Eftimiu – Romanian poet and playwright.
- Aleksandër Stavre Drenova – poet
- Lasgush Poradeci – writer and poet

=== Media, writers, and journalists ===
- N. D. Cocea – Romanian journalist, novelist, critic and left-wing political activist.
- Dora d'Istria – Wallachian-born Romantic writer, feminist and figure of the Albanian National Awakening.
- George Magheru – Romanian poet and playwright.

== See also ==
- Albania–Romania relations
- Albanian diaspora
- Immigration to Romania
- Names of the Albanians and Albania
- Arbanasi
- Arbëreshë
- Albanians in Ukraine

== Sources ==
- Cernovodeanu, Paul (1982). "Ştiri privitoare la Gheorghe Ghica vodă al Moldovei ( 1658– 1659 ) şi la familia sa (I)". Anuarul Institutului de Istorie și Arheologie "A.D. Xenopol." (in Romanian). 19. Institutul de Istorie și Arheologie "A.D. Xenopol.".
- Wasiucionek, Michal (2012). "Ethnic solidary in the wider Ottoman Empire revisited: cins and local political elites in 17th century Moldavia and Wallachia". In Sariyannis, Marinos (ed.). New Trends in Ottoman Studies: Papers presented at the 20th CIÉPO Symposium Rethymno, 27 June – 1 July 2012. University of Crete – Department of History and Archaeology.
- Wasiucionek, Michal (2016). Politics and Watermelons: Cross-Border Political Networks in the Polish-Moldavian-Ottoman Context in the Seventeenth Century (PDF) (Thesis). European University Institute. Archived from the original (PDF) on 2021-08-15.
- Georgiţă, Mihai (2009). "Mihai The Brave and South Danube Christendom" (PDF). Crisia. XXXIX. Muzeul Țării Crișurilor.
- Zsuzsa, Plainer (2020). ALBANEZII DIN ROMÂNIA. ISPMN. ISBN 978-6068377650.
