= Ecaterina Cercheza =

17th-century prince consort of Moldavia

Doamna Ecaterina Cercheza (Romanian) Пщыпхъу Екатерина (Adyghe) Princess Catherine the Circassian (English)

Princess consort of Moldavia
- Tenure: 1640–1653
- Born: c. 1620; Circassia (present-day Russia)
- Died: after 1 March 1666
- Burial: Iaşi, Principality of Moldavia (present-day Romania)
- Spouse: Vasile Lupu
- Issue: Ștefăniță Lupu; Ioan; Alexandru
- Religion: Eastern Orthodoxy

Doamna Ecaterina Cercheza (c. 1620 – after 1 March 1666) was a Circassian noblewoman who became Princess consort of Moldavia by marriage to Vasile Lupu. As reported by Evliya Çelebi, her mother was the sister of Koca Dervish Mehmed Pasha who was the Grand Vizier of the Ottoman Empire from 1653 to 1654, and her sister was married to Islam III Giray, Khan of Crimea (1644–1654). She played a major role on personal and political decisions of her husband and son Ştefăniţă Lupu. Well known for her philanthropic activities, Doamna Ecaterina Cercheza became patron of the Moldavian monasteries and churches. She developed a strong reputation for her diplomatic and negotiating skills in time of crisis, in the absence of her husband and son.

In his work The Return 1639, the Italian traveller Niccolò Barsi da Lucca illustrates in details the journey of Doamna Ecaterina whom he describes as having "all the attributes of Aphroditic beauty that a woman can ever have". The historian and Prime Minister of Romania (1931–1932) Nicolae Iorga also states that "the Princess [Ecaterina], a Circassian by birth, was extraordinarily beautiful" and highly appreciated all over Moldavia.

== Marriage to Vasile Lupu ==
Originating from a wealthy Circassian family in the Caucasus, Ecaterina (born circa 1620) was brought to Moldavia in 1639 to marry Vasile Lupu who, upon the death of his first wife Doamna Tudosca (1600 – May 1639), immediately sent Ambassador Nicolae Catargie to look through the entire Circassian land for a new wife. Catargie paid 1500 ducats as dowry to Ecaterina's parents before taking her to Crimea. On 19 August 1639, they left Bakhchysarai to go to the fortress Ochakov. With the permission of Bahadır I Giray who received 1000 ducats, hundreds of Tatar and Moldavian guards accompanied the Circassian Princess to the Moldavian border. Although the journey was later interrupted by Nasuh Hussein Pasha, Beylerbey of Silistra (1638–1640), the conflict was resolved with Pasha receiving 2000 ducats. The delegation was met by a special escort even at the border crossing in Moldavia, which consisted of boyars and senior government military officials since the hospitality of foreign guests represented a particular ritual for them. On 28 September 1639, Ecaterina has finally arrived in the capital. On the entrance in Iaşi they were met by Vasile Lupu himself. For the arrival of the luxury-lover ruler's bride, money was not saved and Ecaterina has been honored with numerous pre-wedding gifts in addition to the most distinguished reception. Her brother and her maid were lodged in a separate residence, especially built for them.

The wedding was of major political importance.

== Official activities ==
Doamna Ecaterina Cercheza undertook official engagements in Moldavia. She participated alongside Vasile Lupu at all official celebrations, including the weddings of Princess Maria and Princess Ruxandra whose fates were determined by Ecaterina herself. Doamna Ecaterina also made cash donations to the Golia and Hlincea monasteries, among others. She equipped the Golia Monastery with pews brought from Constantinople.

Because of the battle for the throne between Gheorghe Ştefan and Vasile Lupu, Doamna Ecaterina left her family to Kamianets-Podilskyi. During the Ottoman deposition of her spouse in 1653, she was evacuated to the city of Suceava. The historian Georg Krauss states that although she initially refused to surrender, defending Suceava during the Ottoman siege, Doamna Ecaterina was forced to capitulate and compelled to give her jewels as well as five of her most beautiful horses. Then she was taken captive to Bistrița, where she was imprisoned until 1658. When her son ascended to the throne in November 1659, she accompanied him to Iaşi and supervised his activity. In 1661, after the death of her husband and son, Doamna Ecaterina Cercheza moved to Constantinople and spent four years in the family palace on the Bosphorus. In 1665, she returned to Moldavia. Her last attestation appears in a donation document issued on 1 March 1666.

== Issue ==
The couple had three children together: Ştefăniţă (d. 1661), Ioan (d. 1648), and Alexandru (d. 1648). In 1659, Ştefăniţă became Voivode of Moldavia under the name Ştefăniţă Lupu.

== See also ==
- Circassian beauties
