= Moldavian campaign of Bohdan Khmelnytsky (1650) =

Cossack Campaign

Moldavian campaign of 1650
- Part of Khmelnytsky Uprising
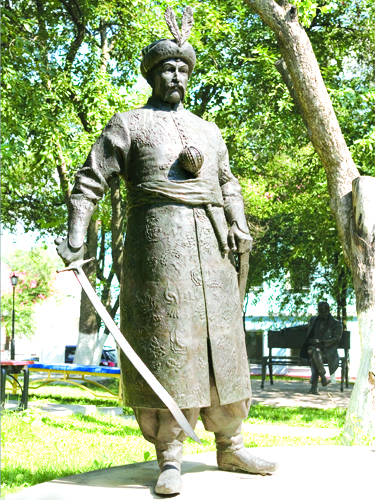
- Monument dedicated to Bohdan Khmelnytsky in Kyiv, Ukraine. The authors are Boris Krylov and Oles Sydoruk.
Date	August – 17 September 1650
Location	Moldavia
Result	Cossack–Tatar victory

Belligerents
Moldavia	Cossack Hetmanate; Crimean Khanate

Commanders and leaders
Vasile Lupu; Stephan Murhulets †	Bohdan Khmelnytsky; Tymofiy Khmelnytsky; Danylo Nechai; İslâm III Giray

Strength
Unknown	16,000–40,000 Cossacks; 20,000–30,000 Tatars

Casualties and losses
Heavy	Light

The Moldavian campaign of 1650 was a joint Cossack-Tatar invasion of Moldavia launched following the victory of the Cossacks in the revolt against the Commonwealth.

== Background ==
Vasile Lupu, the ruler of the Moldavian principality, maintained friendly relations with Bohdan Khmelnytsky from October 1648, but he also sent information about the state of the Zaporozhian Army to Warsaw and lent the royal government money to hire soldiers. The Hetman decided to wage a campaign to further tie Moldavia to the Hetmanate. Bohdan Khmelnytsky convinced his ally, the khan İslâm III Giray to accompany him on a campaign to Moldavia, mentioning the Moldavian attacks on Tatar detachments returning from the Polish—Lithuanian Commonwealth in 1648. This also helped Khmelnytsky avoid accompanying the Khan on a campaign against Russia. Some sources claim the Khan was the architect of the campaign, and the Cossacks played a supporting role.

== Campaign ==
Khmelnytsky left Chyhyryn and stopped at Uman to get reinforced by other Cossack regiments on 12 July. In August 1650, the Cossack force of 16 to 40,000 merged with a Tatar force of 20 to 30,000 near the town of Yampil. The town was located opposite the Moldavian fortress Soroca on the shores of the Dnester. Two Cossack regiments stayed on the Dnister left bank, and Khmelnytsky led the rest across the Moldavian border. After crossing the Dnester, the joint force was divided in two. One army marched on the capital Iasi, and other went north in the direction of Suceava and devastated that land. Vasile Lupu did not expect such an attack. After asking the Sultan for protection, he was advised to buy off the Tatars.

The Moldavian forces initially attempted to resist the Cossack-Tatar army, however they were unsuccessful, and stopped when Danylo Nechay's force reached Iași. Vasile Lupu fled with his family from the city. The Tatars looted and plundered Iași. In the north, the joint Cossack-Tatar forces devastated the land, leaving only churches and monasteries undamaged. The mayor of Chernivtsi, Stephan Murhulets, was killed. The population was subject to frantic looting, as well as slave raids.

== Outcome ==
Lupu paid the Khan 20-100 thousand thalers, and the Tatars left Moldavia. Vasile Lupu sent Khmelnytsky, who was staying in the north of Moldavia near Kamianets-Podilskyi in order to be ready for a potential Polish intervention, many gifts, among which was a sable coat covered with gold as well as a payment of 12-40 thousand thalers. In the end, an agreement between the Cossacks and Moldavia was reached. Moldavia agreed to a royal marriage of Khmelnytsky's son Tymofiy to the daughter of Lupu, Ruxandra, as well as the revocation of the Moldavian-Polish alliance. Cossack forces left Moldavia on 17 September 1650, after the agreement was concluded.

== Aftermath ==
In 1651 the Cossack-Polish war resumed; the Cossacks suffered a major defeat at the battle of Berestechko, following which Vasile Lupu refused to go through with his obligations. However, following the Battle of Batih, the Cossack army of Tymofiy Khmelnytsky once again invaded Moldavia, and Lupu was forced to go through with his obligations. Tymofiy married Ruxandra in late August 1652.
