= Wedding campaign of Tymofiy Khmelnytsky =

Cossack Campaign

- Part of Khmelnytsky Uprising
Date	July–September 1652
Location	Moldavia
Result	Cossack victory

Belligerents
Moldavia	Cossack Hetmanate

Commanders and leaders
Vasile Lupu	Tymofiy Khmelnytsky; Osip Glukh

Strength
Unknown	6,000

The Wedding campaign of Tymofiy Khmelnytsky in 1652 was a campaign in Moldavia by Bohdan Khmelnytsky's eldest son to force the Moldavian voivode to marry off his daughter Ruxandra Lupu to him, as had been arranged in 1650 after Khmelnytsky's first campaign into Moldavia.

== Background ==
Vasile Lupu, the ruler of the principality, maintained friendly relations with Bohdan Khmelnytsky from October 1648, but he also sent information about the state of the Zaporozhian Army to Warsaw and lent the royal government money to hire soldiers. The Hetman decided to wage a campaign to further tie Moldavia to the Hetmanate Khmelnytsky convinced his ally, the khan İslâm III Giray to accompany him on a campaign to Moldavia, mentioning the Moldavian attacks on Tatar detachments returning from the Polish-Lithuanian Commonwealth in 1648.

Having crossed the Dniester with the Tatars, the hetman occupied Iași in September 1650, and then demanded an alliance in an ultimatum, which was to be secured by the marriage of the voivode's daughter Ruxandra to Khmelnytsky's son Tymofiy. While tying Moldavia to Ukraine, this marriage would tie the Cossack leader to the various noble and royal families of eastern Europe.

In the aftermath of the Battle of Berestechko, Vasile Lupu refused to fulfil his obligations to the Cossacks. Following the Battle of Batih, the Cossacks were once again in a position to invade Moldavia.

== Invasion and marriage ==
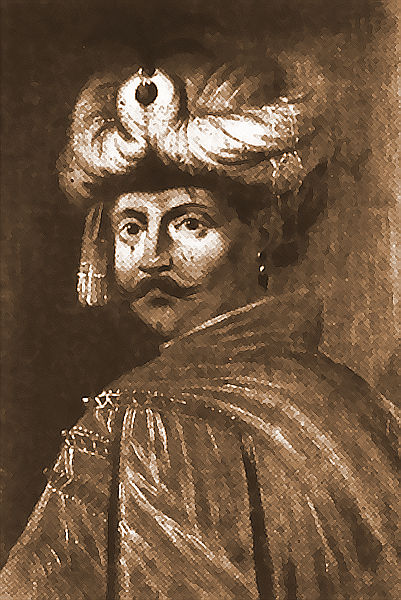
Tymofiy Khmelnytsky

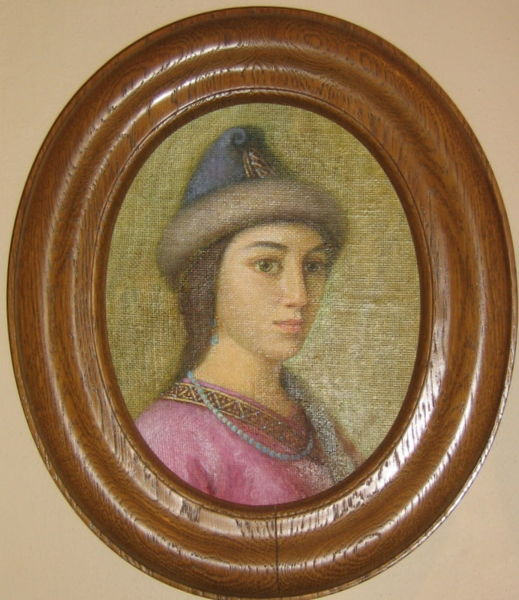
Ruxandra Lupu

In the aftermath of Batih, the Uman Regiment led by Tymofiy, which took part in the battle, headed towards Kamianets-Podilskyi and besieged it. After the failure of the siege, Tymofiy crossed the border into Moldavia and set off with the regiment to the Moldavian capital of Iași, forcing Vasile Lupu to go through with the 1650 arrangement. The Moldavian voivode was impressed with the regiment's performance and attempted to enlist the support of Colonel Osip Glukh in difficult circumstances for himself. The wedding took place in Iași on either the 21 or the 31 of August 1652, and in early September Tymofiy returned to Ukraine with his wife.

== Aftermath ==
The marriage did not bring the Hetman the expected benefits. In the spring of 1653, another dynastic rebellion broke out in Moldova, in which the pretender to the throne, Gheorghe Ștefan, was supported by Transylvania and Wallachia. The Zaporozhian army led by Tymofiy Khmelnytsky once again invaded Moldavia. This campaign would prove to be a failure, and fatal for Tymofiy.
