= Stephen X =

Stephen X may refer to:

- Pope Stephen IX (r. 1057–58)
- Ștefăniță Lupu, Voivode (Prince) of Moldavia between 1659 and 1661, and again in 1661
