= Ghica family =

Romanian-Albanian Noble family

Ghica Gjika
- Country: Wallachia; Moldavia; Kingdom of Romania
- Current region: Romania
- Origin: Albania
- Founder: Gjergj Gjika

The House of Ghica (or Ghika) (Romanian: Ghica; Albanian: Gjika; Greek: Γκίκας, Gikas) was a Romanian noble family of Albanian origin whose members held significant positions in Wallachia, Moldavia and later in the Kingdom of Romania, between the early 17th century and late 19th century. The Ghica family produced many voivodes of Wallachia and Moldavia and two Prime Ministers of Romania. Several branches of the family still exist today.

== History ==
=== Origins ===
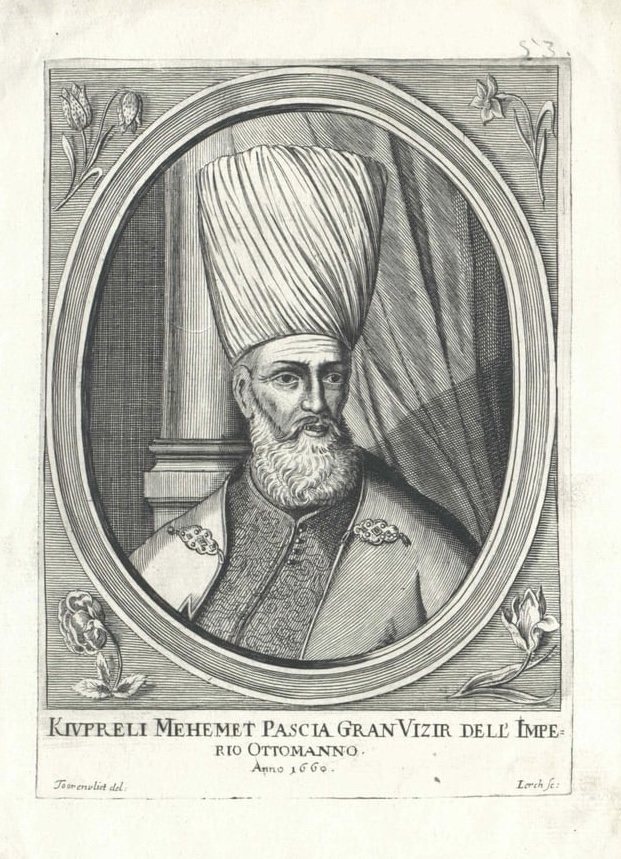
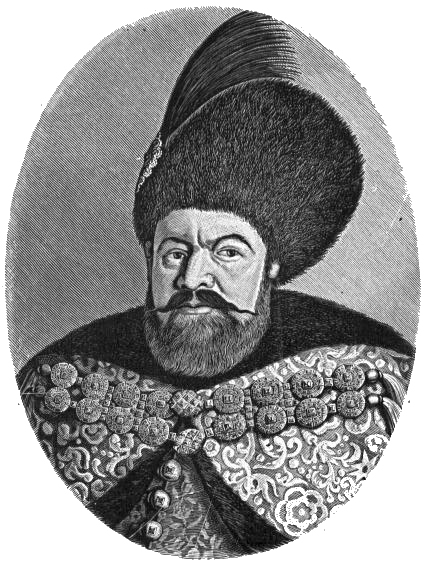
Right: Vasile Lupu (1595–1661), voivode of Moldavia
Left: Köprülü Mehmed Pasha (1575–1661), Grand Vizier of the Ottoman Empire.
These high-ranked Albanian figures in the Ottoman hierarchy promoted the rise of Gheorghe Ghica (another Albanian) in the Romanian principalities.

The Ghica family is of Albanian origin. The first recorded Ghica in historical records is Gheorghe Ghica. His family originally came from Albania and the wider region of Epirus and was possibly born in North Macedonia, south of the city of Skopje, in Köprülü (present-day Veles). Köprülü as his birthplace may be a later mistake based on Ion Neculce's literary narrative about his ties to Köprülü Mehmed Pasha. Mihai Cantacuzino in the 18th century place his geographical origin from the Albanians of Zagora, in the region of Ianina - modern Zagori, a World Heritage Site remotely situated in the Pindus mountains near Ioannina in Epirus (region) and famous for famous for the Zagorochoria, villages with traditional stone architecture in a stunning landscape. In all available historical sources, despite the discrepancies about his exact birthplace, he is always referred to as an Albanian, an indication of his origin's role in the patronage networks which supported his political career. His father's name is unknown but Alexandru Ghica, a descendant of Gheorghe Ghica, suggested that his name was Matei (ca. 1565–1620). This figure hasn't been recorded in archival material and his existence is disputed. Gheorghe Ghica was engaged in commerce in Constantinople and traveled as a merchant to Iași in the Romanian principalities. Ghica quickly moved upwards in the Romanian principalities mainly because he supported and was supported by other Albanians in the central and regional Ottoman administration. Ghica joined Vasile Lupu, an Albanian emigre who was Voivode of Moldavia and became his most trusted officer and representative in the Ottoman court. Miron Costin (1633–1691), a contemporary Romanian historian wrote about the clientelist relations in Ottoman hierarchy between figures of the same origin and noted that being of the same origin as him [Ghica] – that is Albanian – voievode Vasile brought him to the court and entrusted him some minor offices, and later [Ghica] reached the position of the Chief Judge of Lower Moldavia. Lupu's fall brought Ghica to an alliance with another Albanian, the Grand Vizier of the Ottoman Empire, Köprülü Mehmed Pasha. In the Romanian principalities, Mehmed Pasha promoted an 'ethnicity-based patronage system' and chose to appoint Albanians as a means to strengthen his apparatus in the region. Gheorghe Ghica (voivode of Moldavia (1658–59), voivode of Wallachia (1859–1860)), his son Grigore (voivode of Wallachia, 1660–64), and Vasile Lupu's son, Ștefăniță Lupu (voivode of Moldavia, 1659–61) all were appointed by Köprülü Mehmed Pasha. Ion Neculce (1672–1745), another contemporary Romanian historian who continued the tradition of Miron Costin, recorded a tale about Gheorge Gica and Mehmed Pasha. According to the tale, they came from poor families and had met when they were children in Constantinople. The future Mehmed Pasha promised that he would help Ghica when he became powerful. Years later when they met again Mehmed Pasha supposedly remembered their meeting and made Ghica, voivode of Moldavia. The tale is definitely a literary construction, but it has historical value because its narration highlights the existing patronage ties of its era. Ghica married Smaragda (Smada) Lână, daughter of Stamate Lână, the Stolnic (Seneschal) of Broşteni. Ghica rooted his family in the feudal class of Romania via the marriage of his son Grigore to the niece of Gheorghe Ștefan.

=== Rise ===
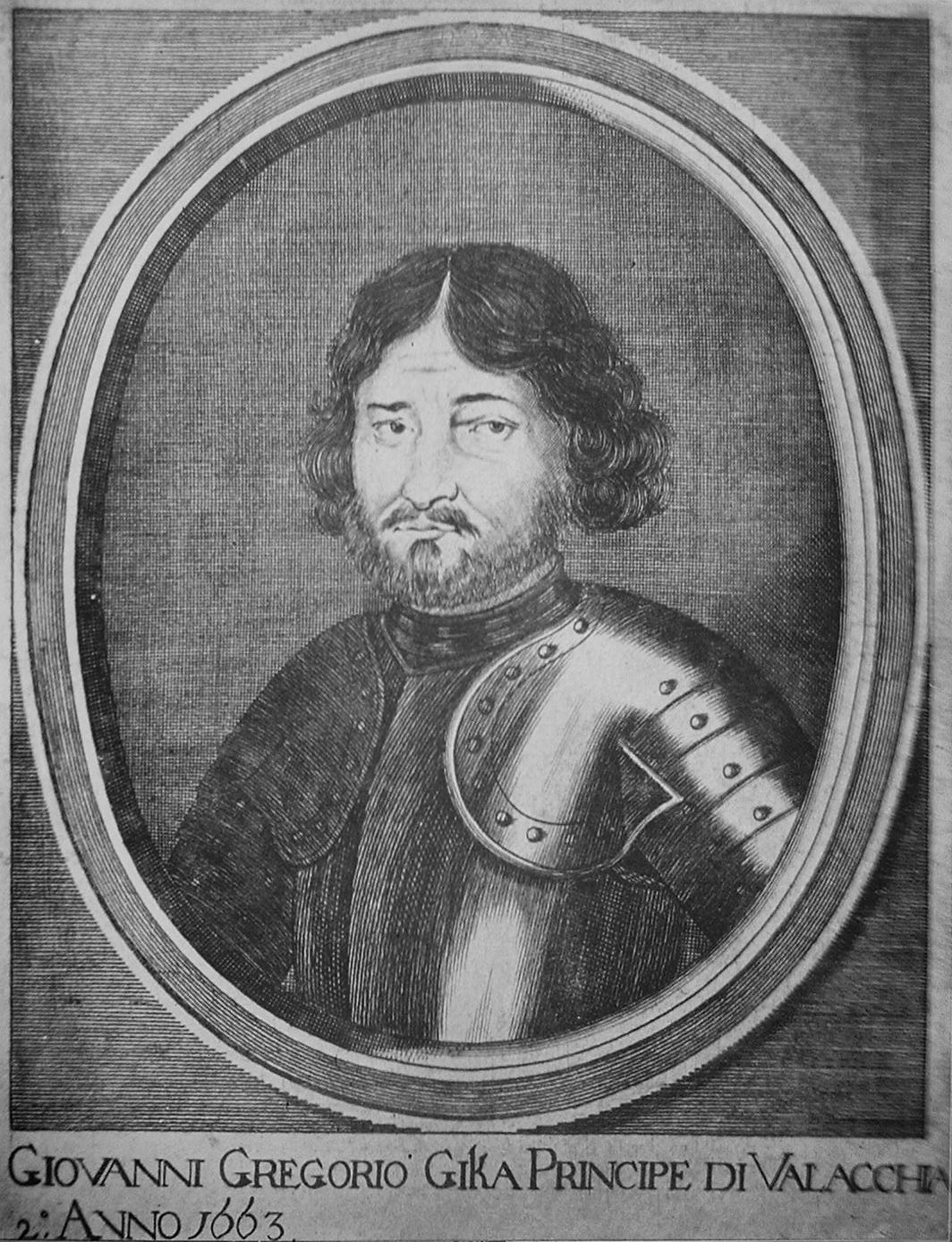
Grigore Ghica, the first Prince of Wallachia (1659–1660 and 1673–1678) from the Ghica family.

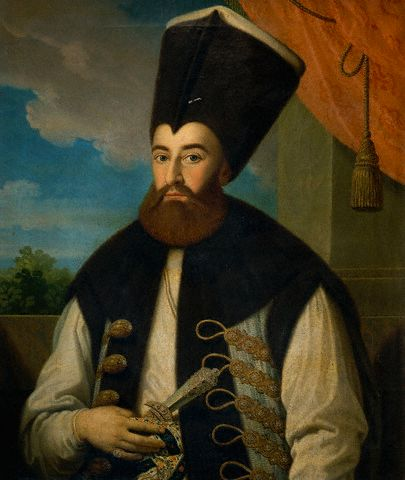
Grigore IV Ghica, Prince of Wallachia (1822–1828)

Following the power vacuum resulting from the failed Transylvanian-Wallachian-Moldavian anti-Ottoman uprising organized by Prince George II Rákóczi, Gheorghe Ghica managed to secure his position as Voivode of Moldavia, a position he held between 1658–1659 and 1659–1660. Unable to cope with the financial burdens imposed by the Porte, he was dismissed; nonetheless, following the intervention of Mehmed Pasha his son Grigore I Ghica became the new voivode. He was Gheorghe Ghica's oldest surviving son, born in Constantinople from a relationship he had with Ecaterina Vlasto, a Catholic from Pera. He had followed his father to Moldavia, where he further raised his family into the ranks of the indigenous Great Boyars, by marrying Maria Sturdza, daughter of Vistiern (Treasurer) Mateiaș Sturdza of the Sturdza family, and niece of the Moldavian Prince Gheorghe Ștefan. The Ghica formed a close alliance with the Sturdza and Cantacuzino families in the 17th century.

Grigore I Ghica's rule was also not free from disturbances due to the conflict with the Sublime Porte and especially because of the disputes between the Boyar parties. Through his political maneuvers and the assassination of his former mentor Constantine Cantacuzino, he instigated the hatred of nobility against him and his entourage. Taking advantage of the defeat of the Ottomans at the Battle of Levice (1664), Grigore fled to Poland and then to Vienna, in search of Habsburg military aid. His hopes having not been materialized, he returned to Constantinople and acquired the Moldavian throne once again in 1672. During his short second reign, the animosity of the Cantacuzinos exploded violently, and after the defeat of the Turks at Khotyn in 1673, Grigore was forced to flee to Constantinople; the hostility of his opponents lost his throne and he will die in Constantinople in 1674.

Grigore I Ghica's children, most notably Matei (Grigore) Ghica, assured the continuation of the lineage. Matei Ghica lived exclusively in Greek Phanar neighborhood of Constantinople. The marriage with Ruxandra Mavrocordat, daughter of Alexander Mavrocordatos, the Dragoman of the Sublime Porte, introduced Matei to the Phanariote nucleus – now the religious, cultural and political hegemons of the Christian Ottoman subjects and vassals – and ensured a path of political ascendancy for his descendants. He became Grand Drogoman of The Fleet, and in 1739 he negotiated an agreement with the Sultan whereby the key position of Grand Dragoman of the Sublime Porte would remain within the fold – i.e. among the descendants of a family pact involving the Ghicas, Mavrocordatos and Racoviţăs.

His son Grigore II Ghica, initiated in the intricacies of the Ottoman politics due to his rank as Dragoman, succeeded in acquiring the Moldavian throne on 26 September 1726. During his rule in Moldavia, Grigore II Ghica made proof of great diplomatic skills by leveling an unfortunate conflict with the Crimean Khanate who threatened to ravage the country. In 1733 a swap of thrones took place, with Grigore II going to Wallachia in place of his cousin Constantine Mavrocordatos. Grigore II Ghica's diplomatic skills proved even more remarkable during the Russo-Austrian-Turkish War, when the Prince of Moldavia, at the request of the Porte, acted as the intermediary and mediator between the Ottomans and Russians through correspondence and exchange of envoys with the Russian Field Marshal Burkhard Christoph von Münnich, with John Bell, the secretary of the British embassy in St. Petersburg, with the French ambassador to Constantinople, Louis Sauveur Villeneuve, as well as with the great Ottoman dignitaries.

== Notable members of the family ==
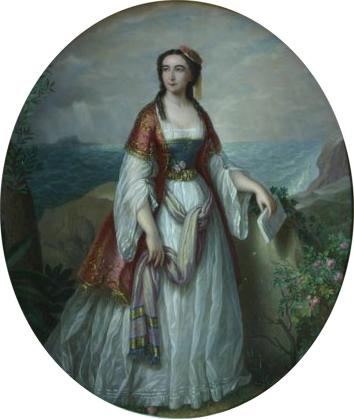
Portrait of Dora d'Istria by Petre Mateescu (1876).

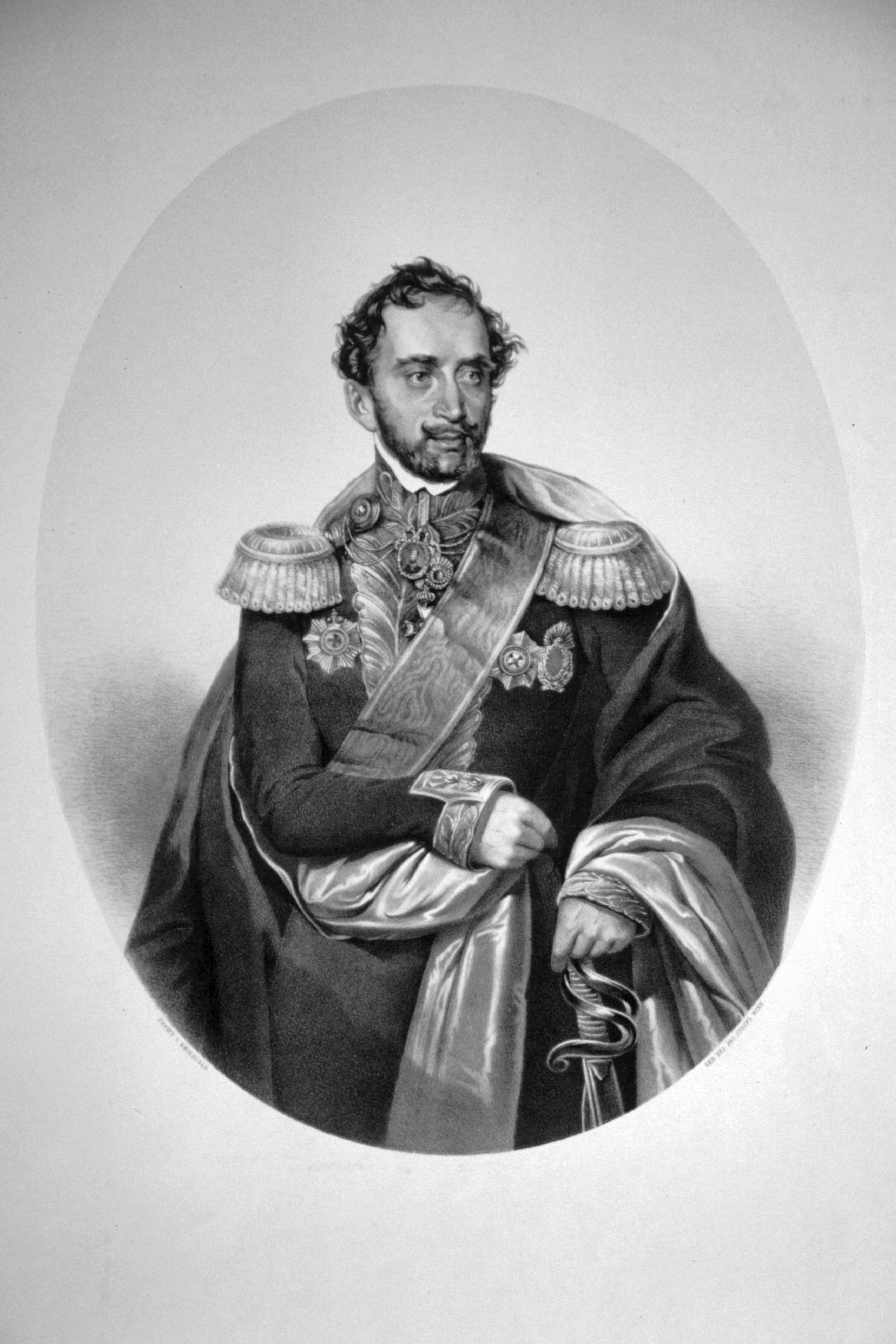
Alexandru II Ghica, Prince of Wallachia (1834–1842)

=== Princes of Wallachia ===
- Gheorghe Ghica: 1659–1660 and 1673–1678
- Grigore I Ghica: 1660–1664 and 1672–1673
- Grigore II Ghica: 1733–1735 and 1748–1752
- Matei Ghica: 1752–1753
- Scarlat Ghica: 1758–1761 and 1765–1766
- Alexandru Ghica: 1766–1768
- Grigore III Ghica: 1768–1769
- Grigore IV Ghica: 1822–1828
- Alexandru II Ghica: 1834–1842

=== Princes of Moldavia ===
- Gheorghe Ghica: 1658–1659
- Grigore II Ghica: 1735–1741 and 1747–1748
- Matei Ghica: 1753–1756
- Scarlat Ghica: 1757–1758
- Grigore III Ghica: 1764–1767 and 1774–1777
- Grigore V Ghica: 1849–1853 and 1854–1856, from Katherine's Moldavian branch

=== Prime Ministers of Romania ===
- Ion Ghica: 1866–1867 and 1870–1871
- Dimitrie Ghica: 1868–1870

=== Others ===
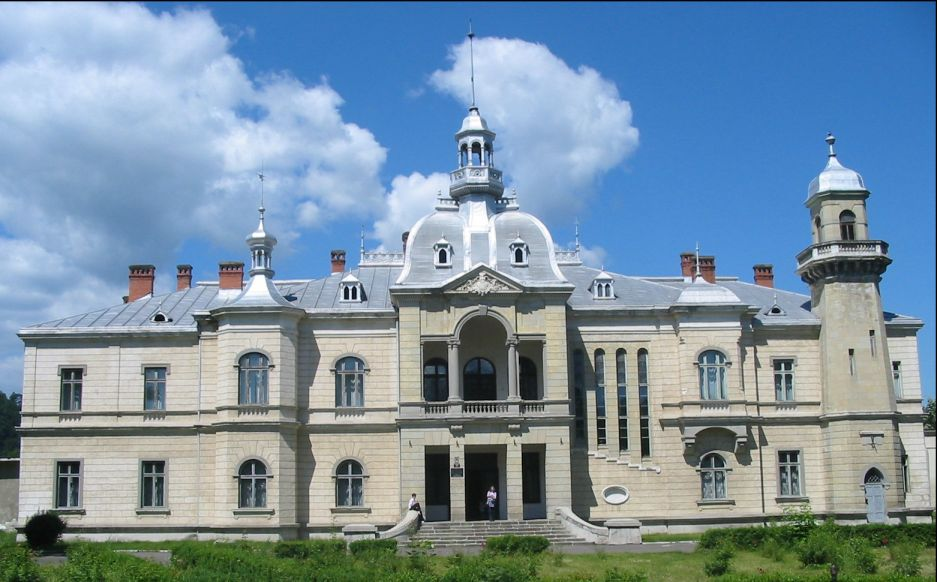
The Ghica Palace in Comăneşti

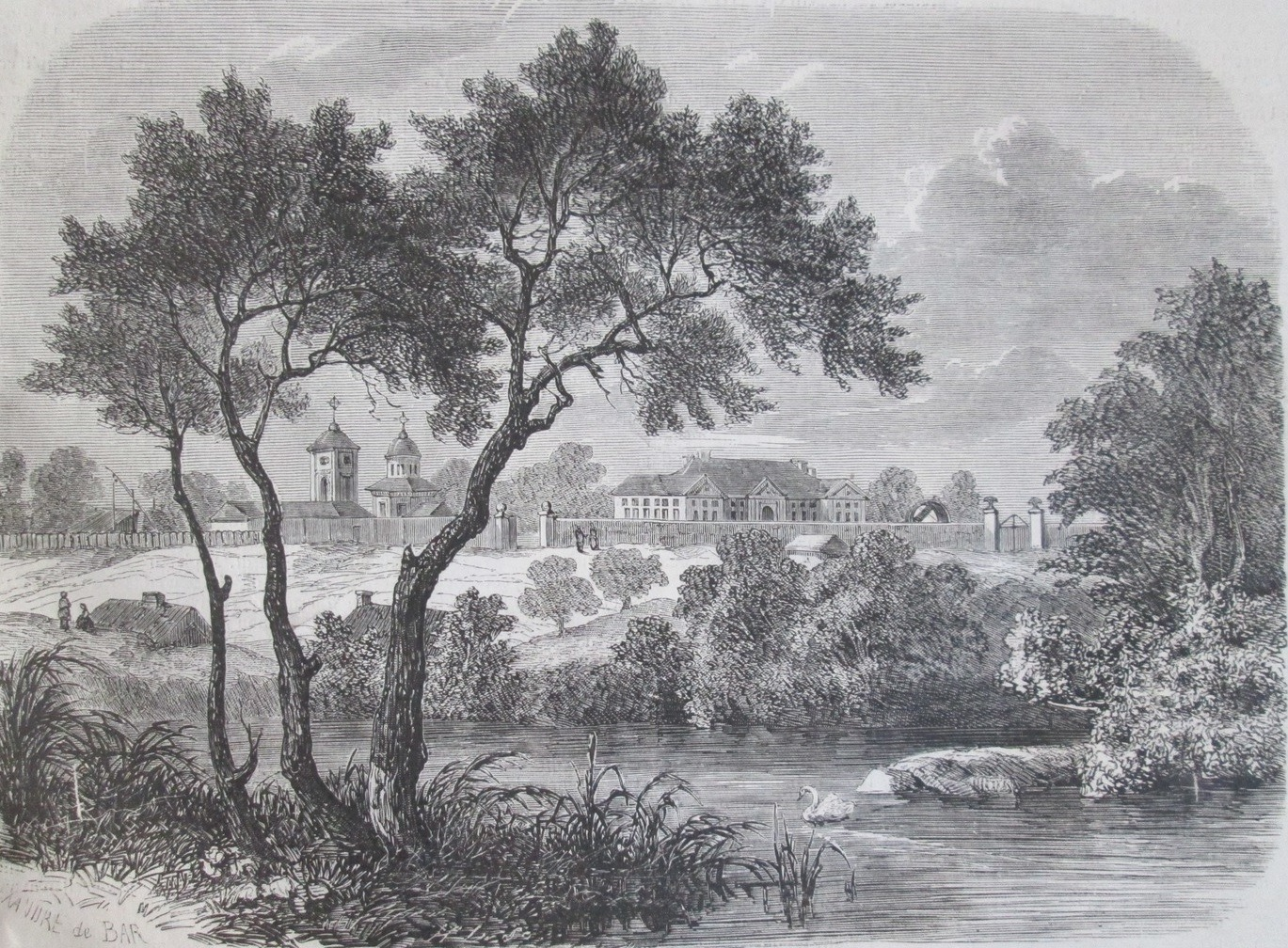
The Ghica Palace in Colentina, Bucharest, 1859.

- Albert Ghica (late 19th century), Romanian socialite and pretender to the Albanian throne
- Alexandrina Pallady (1876–1944), adopted Ghica and married Grigore Gheorghe Cantacuzino, Romanian feminist and fascist activist
- Alexandru Ghika (1902–1964), Romanian mathematician
- Aurélie Soubiran, Princess Ghika (1820–1904), French writer and wife of Grigore Ghika (1812–58), fourth son on Grigore IV
- Dimitrie Ghica (1816–1897), Romanian politician
- Dimitrie Ghica-Comănești (1839–1923), Romanian politician, explorer of Africa, hunter, member of the Romanian Parliament
- Eugen Ghica-Comănești (1839–1914), Romanian politician, Union Army officer
- Dimitrie I. Ghika (1875–1967), Romanian politician, Minister of Foreign Affairs of Romania
- Elena Ghica (1828–1888), Romanian writer
- György Ghika (1882–1966), Hungarian diplomat
- Ioan Grigore Ghica (1830–1881), Romanian politician, Minister of Foreign Affairs and Ministry of National Defense of Romania
- Matila Ghyka (1881–1965), Romanian writer, historian and diplomat
- Pantazi Ghica (1831–1882), Romanian writer, politician and financier
- Vladimir Ghika (1873–1954), Romanian diplomat and Roman Catholic Priest
- Major General Chris Ghika CBE, British Army General

== Bibliography ==
- Cernovodeanu, Paul (1982). "Ştiri privitoare la Gheorghe Ghica vodă al Moldovei ( 1658– 1659 ) şi la familia sa (I)". Anuarul Institutului de Istorie și Arheologie "A.D. Xenopol." (in Romanian). 19. Institutul de Istorie și Arheologie "A.D. Xenopol.".
- Wasiucionek, Michal (2012). "Ethnic solidary in the wider Ottoman Empire revisited: cins and local political elites in 17th century Moldavia and Wallachia". In Sariyannis, Marinos (ed.). New Trends in Ottoman Studies: Papers presented at the 20th CIÉPO Symposium Rethymno, 27 June – 1 July 2012. University of Crete – Department of History and Archaeology.
- Wasiucionek, Michal (2016). Politics and Watermelons: Cross-Border Political Networks in the Polish-Moldavian-Ottoman Context in the Seventeenth Century (PDF) (Thesis). European University Institute.
- Mănescu, Jean-Nicholas: Das Oswaldussymbol in der Wappenwelt Osteuropas. Tom C. Bergroth (edited): Genealogica & Heraldica. Report of The 16th International Congress of Genealogical and Heraldic Sciences in Helsinki 16-21 August 1984. Helsinki 1984, p. 415-424. ISBN 951-99640-4-5
