= Nativity of St. John the Baptist Church, Focșani =

Heritage site in Focșani, Vrancea County, Romania

Coordinates: 45°41′46″N 27°11′07″E

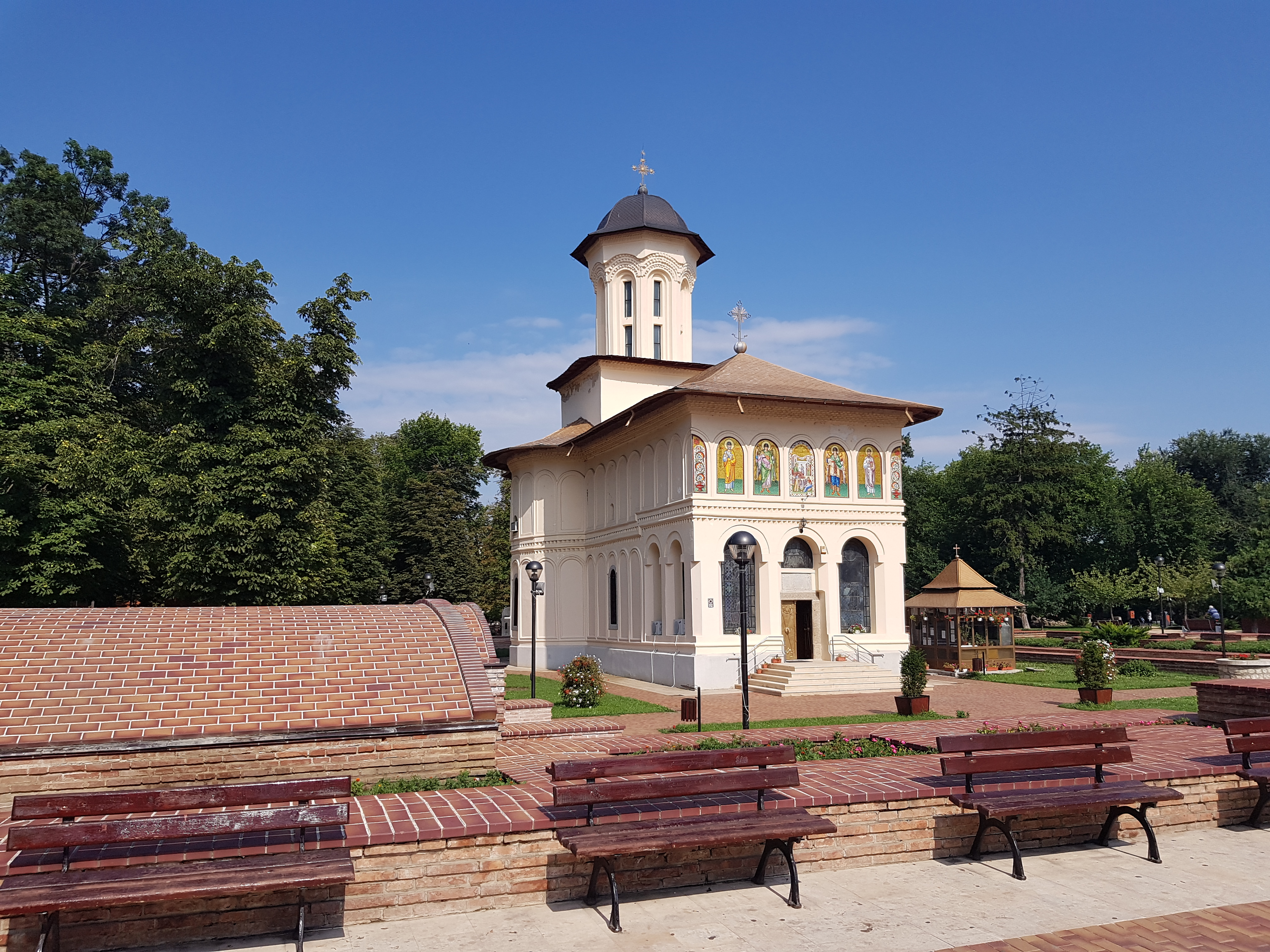
Nativity of St. John the Baptist Church

The Nativity of St. John the Baptist Church (Romanian: Biserica Nașterea Sfântului Ioan Botezătorul) is a Romanian Orthodox church located at 5 Piața Unirii in Focșani, Romania. It is dedicated to the Nativity of Saint John the Baptist.

The church was founded by Grigore I Ghica, Prince of Wallachia, in 1661; the Ghica family would continue to provide support. Originally a monastery church, it is cross-shaped, made of brick and limestone on a stone foundation, in Byzantine style. On the interior, it is 22.40 meters long, 6.50 meters wide, and 9.50 meters high. The floor is of stone blocks. The attached porch, of uncertain date, is around 4 meters long.

The monastery was a cultural and religious center, offering theological training and preparing a large number of monks, priests and deacons. In 1849, it possessed 22 books in Greek and 24 in Romanian Cyrillic. Until the 1863 secularization of monastic estates in Romania, it was a metochion of Agia Anastasia Monastery in Thessaloniki.

The monastery had the appearance of a fortress, surrounded by granite walls over 6 meters thick. On the inside, it had buildings with two stories that included 36 living apartments and 10 basements. It also had towers with embrasures, useful for positioning firearms. One of the wealthiest churches in the area, it owned several villages, estates, vineyards in Odobești, forests, stores and houses in Focșani. It acquired these both through donation and seizure without deed of state land. The wealth and power of the Greek monks stirred resentment among the town inhabitants and conflict with the local administration. Around 1850, following numerous petitions to the royal court, Princes Gheorghe Bibescu and Barbu Dimitrie Știrbei finally asserted control over the monks.

Over the years, the church suffered damage from earthquakes, the devastating 1854 fire, pillage by Ottoman troops during the reign of Constantine Mavrocordatos and by Filiki Eteria forces during the Wallachian uprising of 1821. After the 1854 fire, the monastery lost its majestic appearance. In 1871, the ruined walls were auctioned off to a Jewish merchant. Subsequently, of the old complex, the only remaining components are the church and bell tower, which sits in front. Located near a border post, the church witnessed important events surrounding the 1859 union of the Principalities, including the first Te Deum for national unity held on the square in front of the church, a "Hora Unirii" danced by domnitor Alexandru Ion Cuza, and military marches starting with Romanian independence in 1877.

The church is listed as a historic monument by Romania's Ministry of Culture and Religious Affairs, as is the 1839 tower.
