= Hlincea Monastery =

Heritage site in Iași County, Romania

Coordinates: 47.1114239°N 27.5821584°E

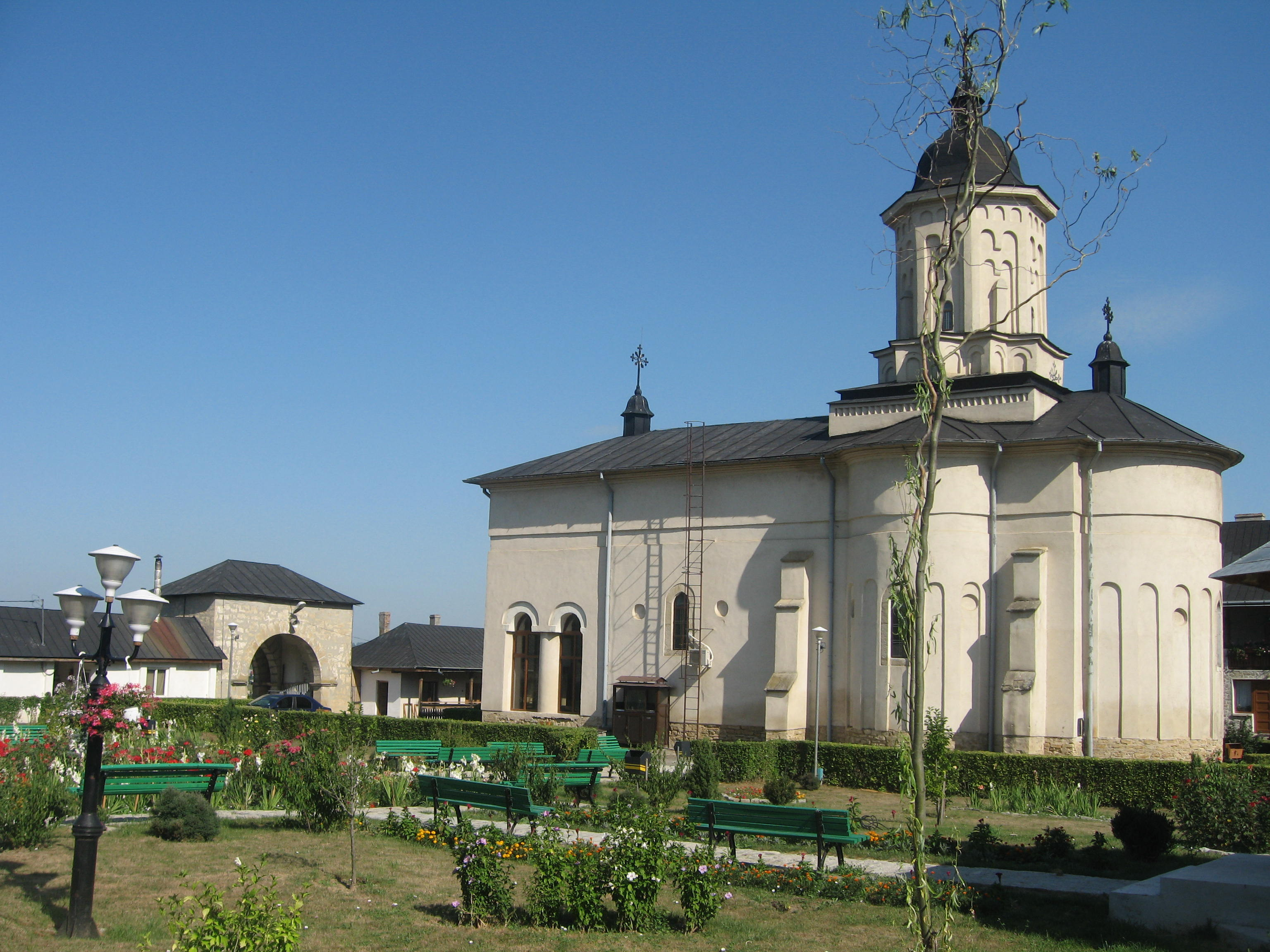

Religion
- Affiliation: Romanian Orthodox Church

Location
- Location: Ciurea, Romania
- Interactive map of Hlincea Monastery

Architecture
- Style: Moldavian
- Completed: 1574
- Materials: stone, brick

The Hlincea Monastery (Romanian: Mănăstirea Hlincea) is a Romanian Orthodox monastery in Ciurea, Iaşi metropolitan area, Romania.

Located at the base of Cetăţuia Hill, the monastery was built by Maria, the daughter of Moldavian Prince Petru Şchiopul and dedicated in 1574. At the middle of the next century, it was rebuilt by Prince Vasile Lupu and finished by his son Ştefăniţă, in November 1660.

The monastery is listed in the National Register of Historic Monuments.
