= Golia Monastery =

Heritage site in Iași, Romania

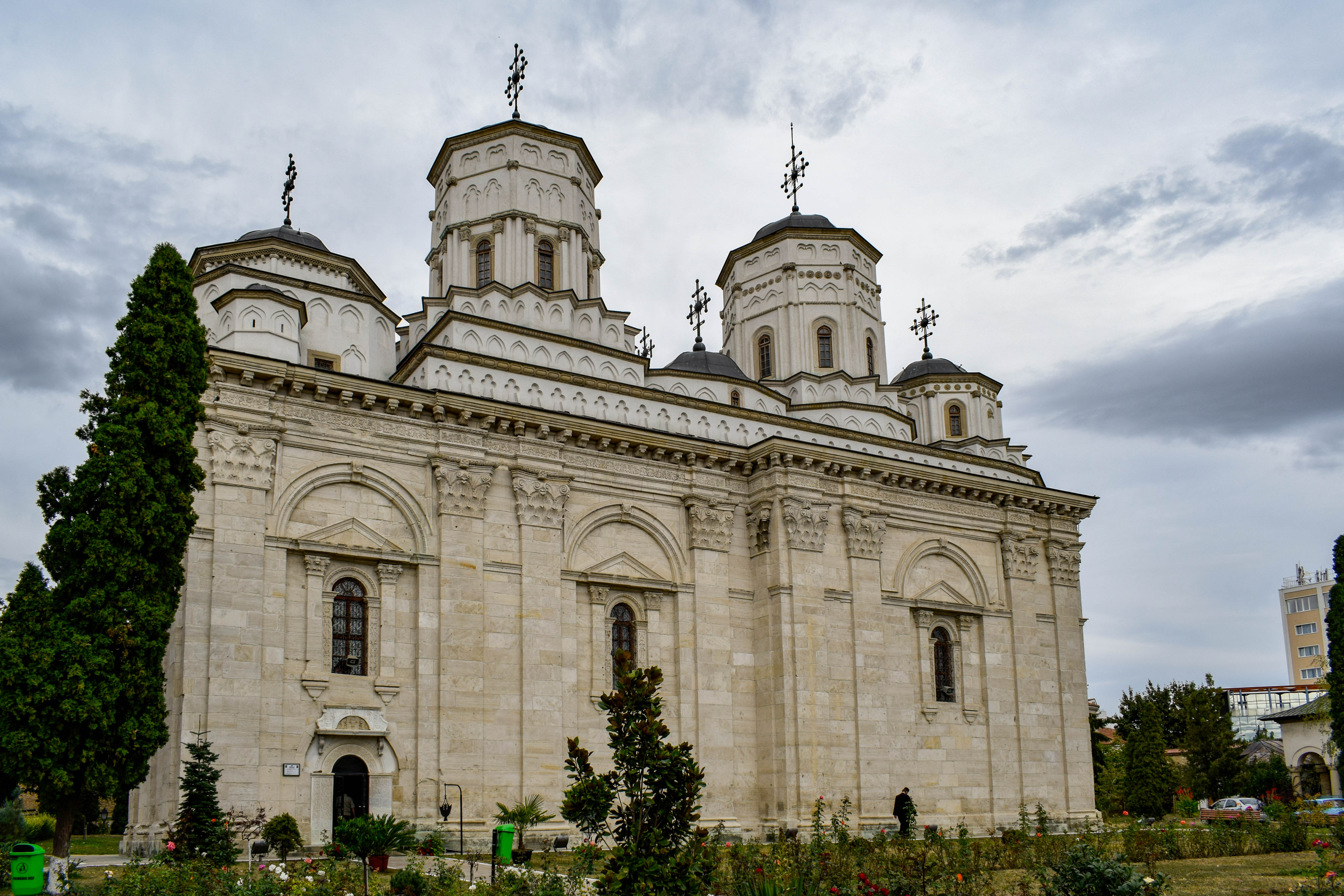
- The church of the Golia Monastery

Religion
- Affiliation: Eastern Orthodox

Location
- Location: Cuza Vodă Street 51, Iași, Romania
- Interactive map of Golia Monastery
- Coordinates: 47.164861°N 27.589389°E

Architecture
- Architects: Vasile and Ștefăniță Lupu
- Style: Renaissance and Byzantine
- Groundbreaking: 1650
- Completed: 1660

Specifications
- Spire height: 30 m
- Materials: Stone, brick

Website
- www.golia.ro

The Golia Monastery (Romanian: Mănăstirea Golia) is a Romanian Orthodox fortified monastery located in Iaşi, Romania. The monastery is listed in the National Register of Historic Monuments. In 2012, the conservation of the Monastery was awarded the European Union Prize for Cultural Heritage / Europa Nostra Award.

== History ==
Located in the middle of the old Moldavian capital and raised on the foundation of the church erected, in the 16th century, by the boyar Ioan Golia, the monastery was rebuilt on a greater scale by Prince Vasile Lupu, between 1650 and 1653, and completed by his son Ştefăniţă.

The monastery is surrounded by tall walls, with corner turrets and a 30 m (98.43 ft) height tower with 120 steps, one of city’s symbols, and houses the Ion Creangă Museum (the writer was curate of the church) and Doxologia Cultural Missionary Centre of the Metropolis of Moldavia and Bukovina.

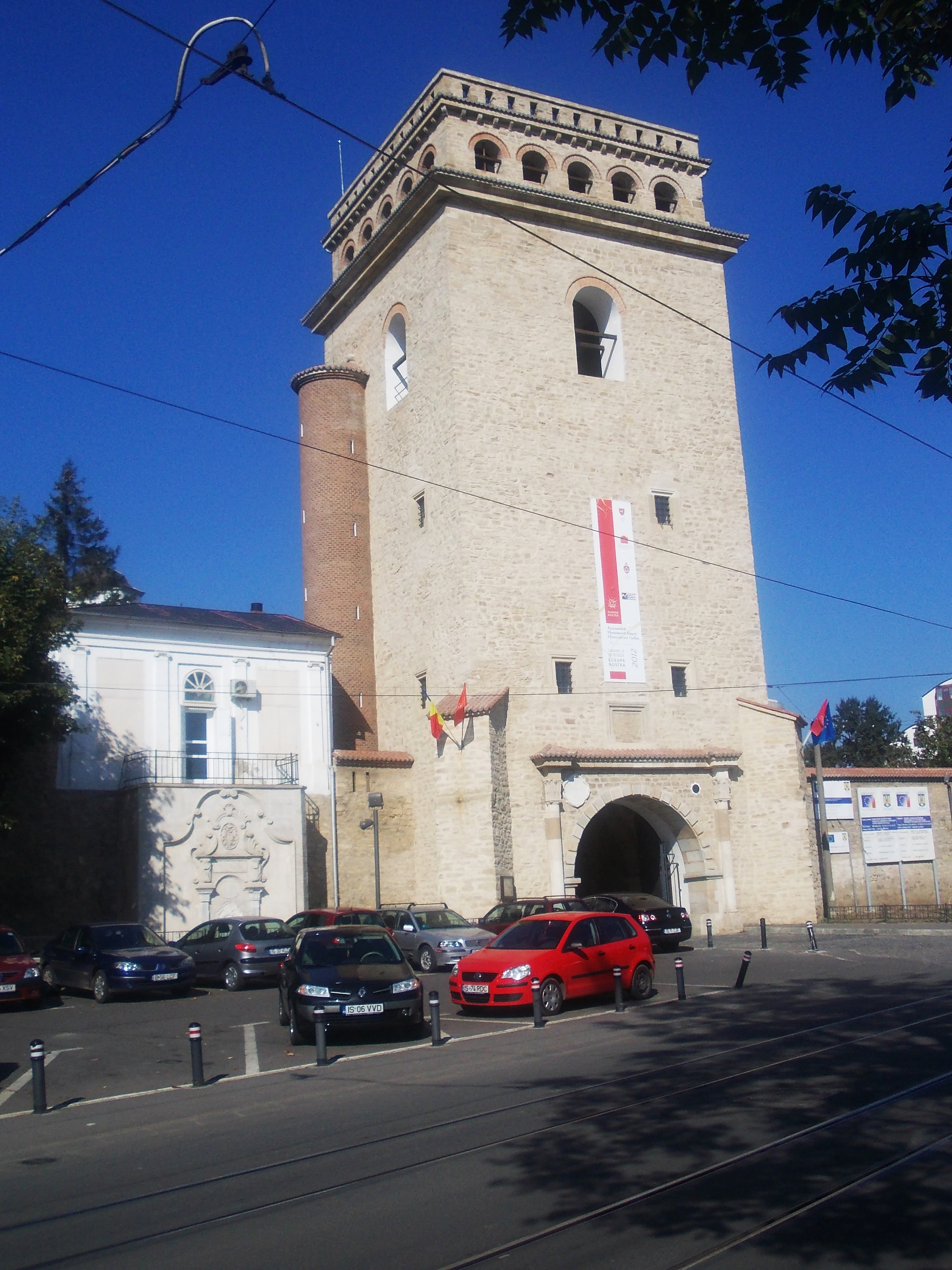
Golia Tower and House of Waters

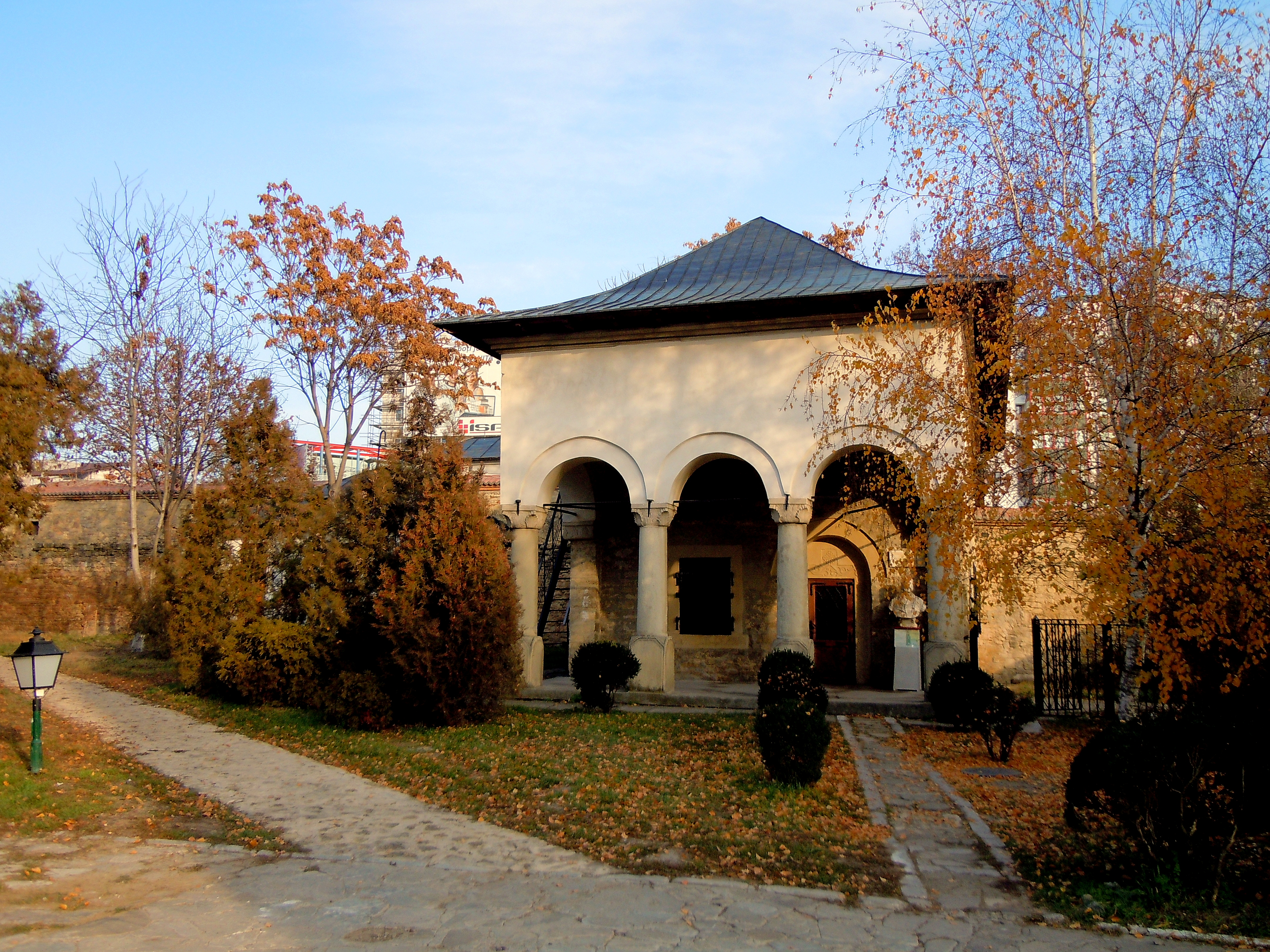
Ion Creangă House

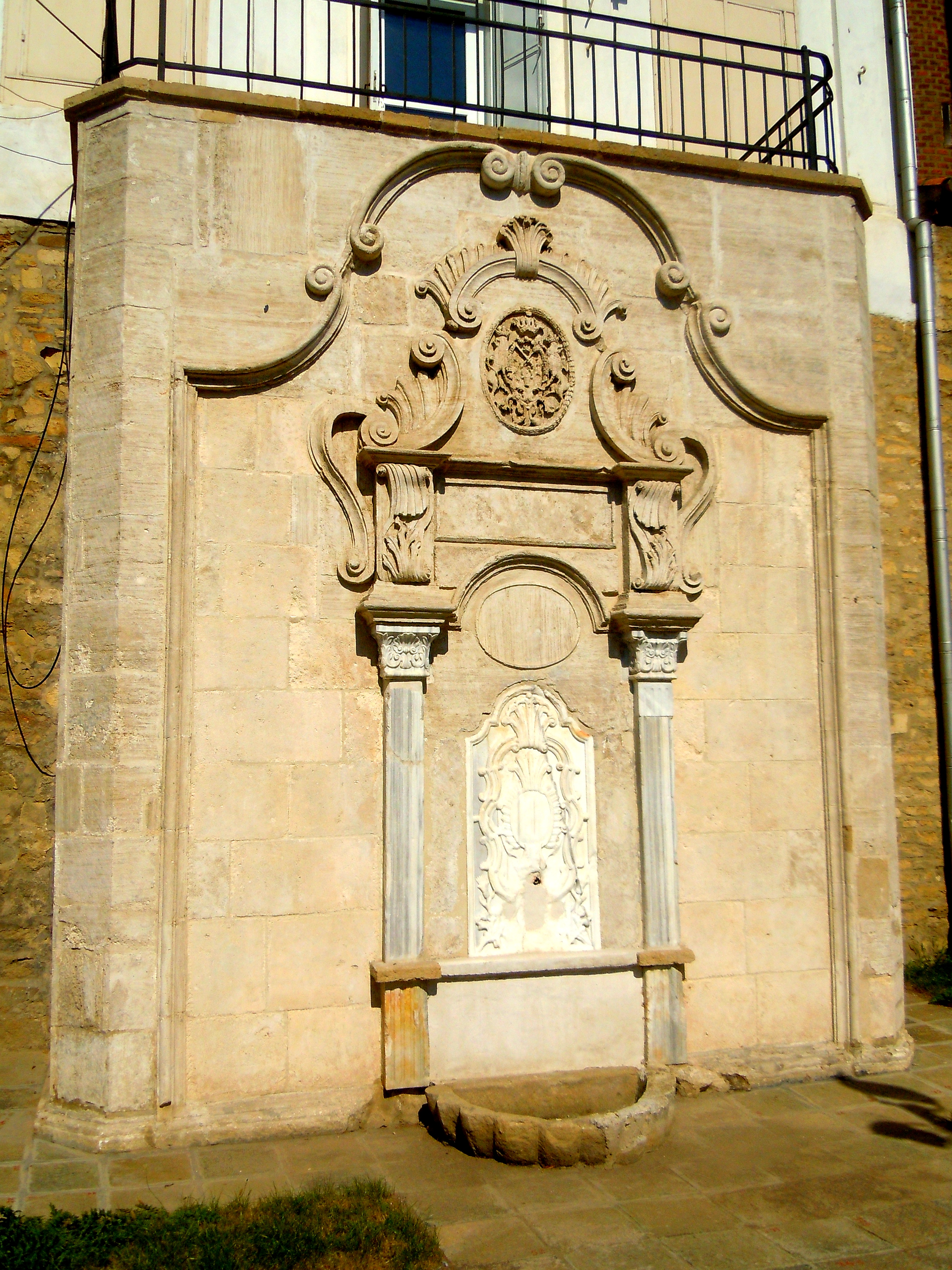
The drinking water fountain

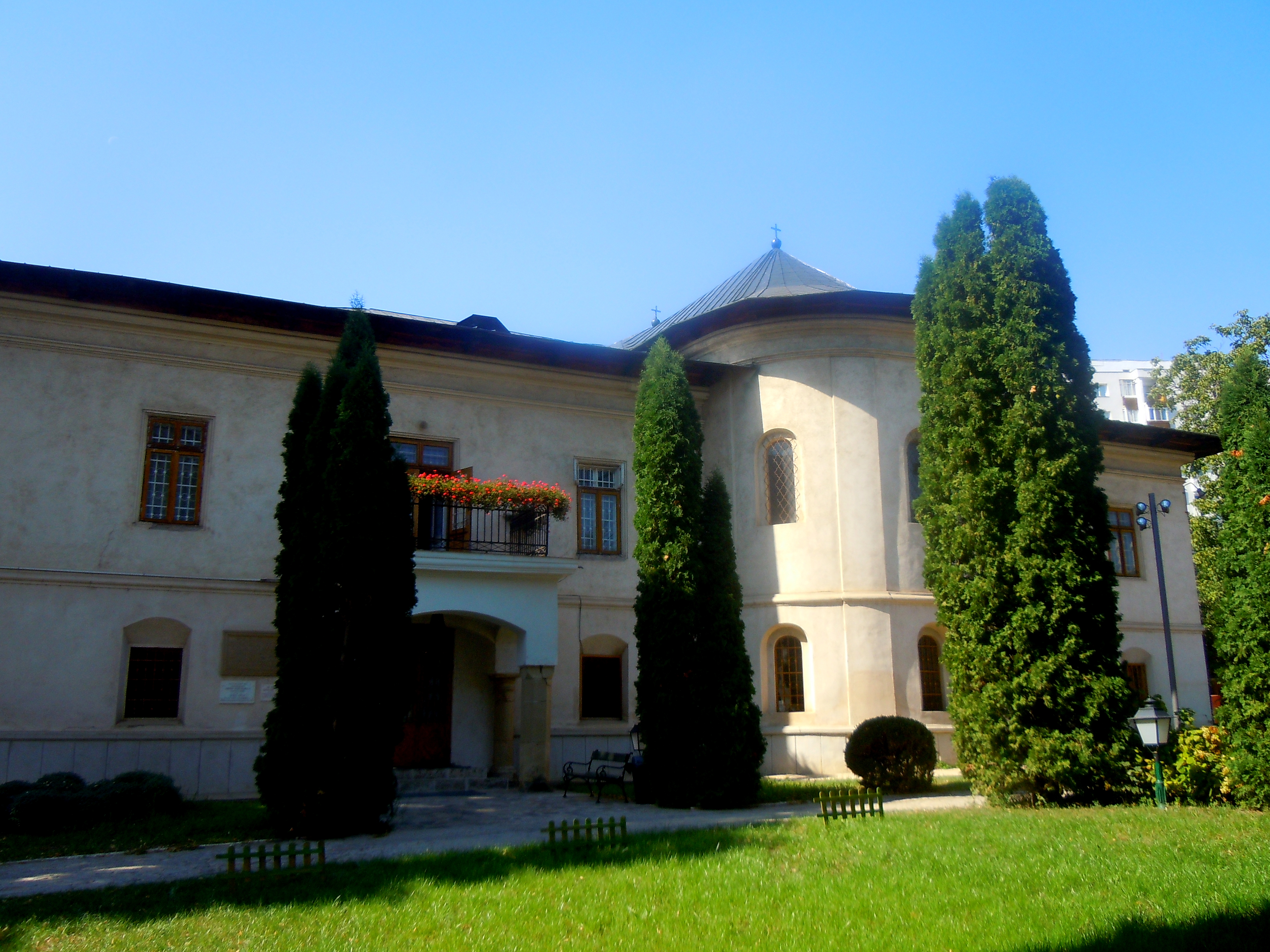
Golia Monastery Priory
