= St. Paraskeva Church, Lviv =

Church building in Lviv, Ukraine

Coordinates: 49°51′06.48″N 24°01′50.3″E

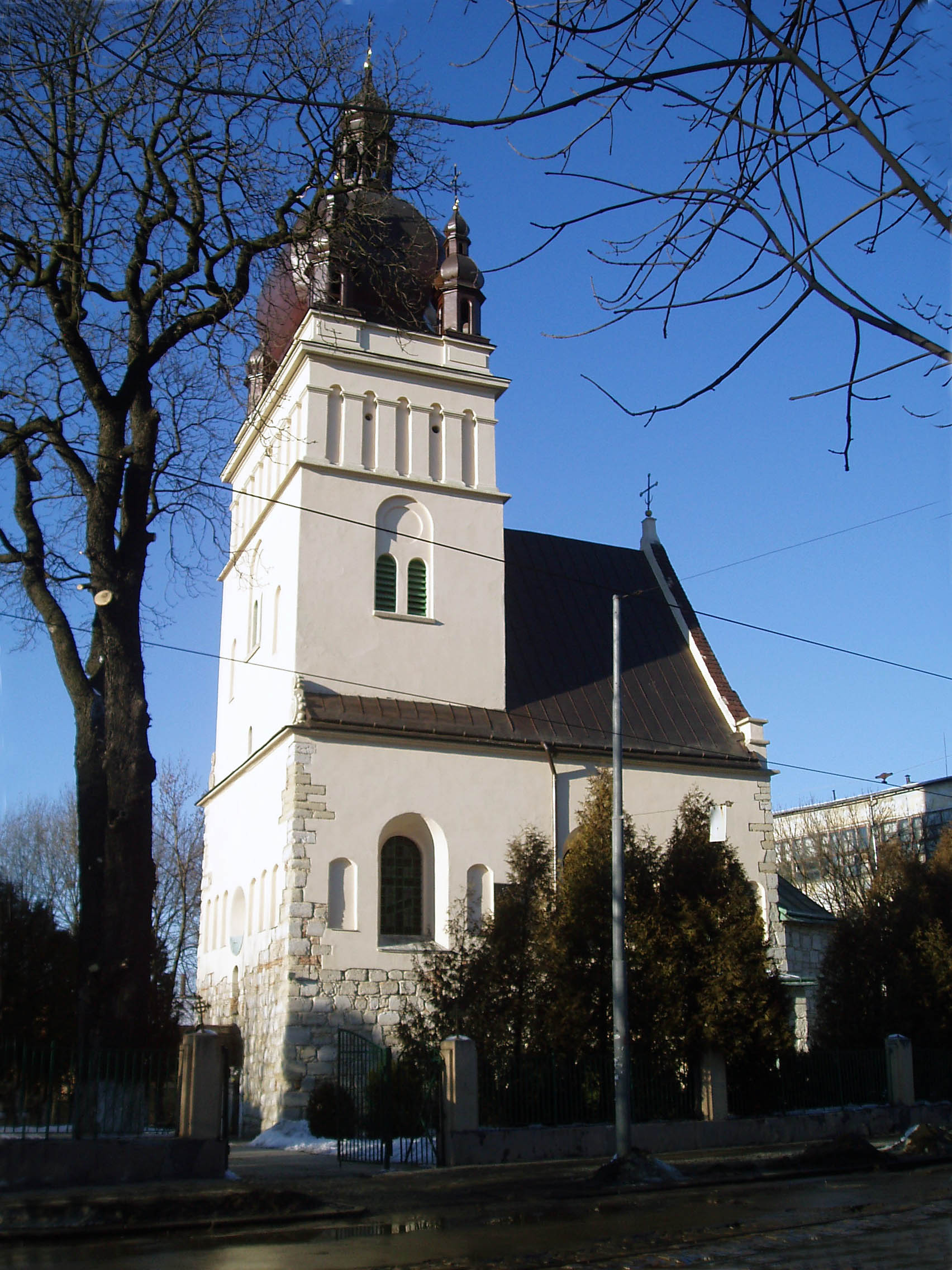
St Paraskevi Church in Lviv

The Church of St. Paraskevi in Lviv (Ukrainian Церква святої Параскеви П'ятниці) is located at Khmelnytsky 77 B (Ukr вул. Богдана Хмельницького, 77В, before 1945 – st. Żółkiewska) at the foot of the High Castle.

== History of the building ==
St.Paraskeva (or Paraskevy Piatnyci) church belongs to the oldest religious buildings of the city. Its construction dates back to the 13th-14th centuries. Was substantially rebuilt after a fire in 1623. Due to the persecution of the Orthodox Church in Polish–Lithuanian Commonwealth funds for reconstruction was provided by Moldavian Voevod Vasile Lupu, which was completed in 1644. Building blocks were hewn sandstone.

The single-nave church has a defensive character – its walls are thick and the windows small, also further demonstrated by the loopholes in the upper storeys of the tower. Enclosed is an octagonal apse. The wall bears the coat of arms of Moldova of the hospodar – the head of an aurochs with the sun, moon and star. In 1885, a fundamental overhaul of the entire building was made.

The high, square tower is linked organically with the competent body of the temple. In 1908, it was covered with a new, domed helmet, designed by architect Michal Łużecki and placed at the current helmet tent, then the smaller towers at the corners were added. A decorative element of the tower is an attic with a blind arcade of arches of Romanesque and Renaissance pilasters. In 1987–1990, a new bell tower was built in the courtyard in front of the façade, which was harmonized with architecture of the old church.

== Mentioned ==
- Ion Turcanu. Illustrated History of Romania, Ed. Litera, Bucuresti-Chisinau, 2007
