= Cultural Union of Albanians of Romania =

Ethnic minority political party in Romania

The Cultural Union of Albanians (Romanian: Uniunea Culturală a Albanezilor din România, UCAR) was an ethnic minority political party in Romania representing the Albanian community.

== History ==
The UCAR contested the 1996 general elections, receiving 8,722 votes (0.07%) and winning a single seat in the Chamber of Deputies under the electoral law allowing political parties representing ethnic minority groups to be exempt from the electoral threshold only applied as long as they received 10% of the vote required for a single seat in the Chamber of Deputies. It was beaten by the League of Albanians of Romania in the 2000 elections, losing its seat.

== Electoral history ==
Election	Chamber of Deputies			Senate		
Election	Votes	%	Seats	Votes	%	Seats
1996	8,722	0.07	1	–	–	–
2000	7,798	0.06	0	–	–	–
