= League of Albanians of Romania =

League of Albanians of Romania Liga Albanezilor din România Lidhja e shqiptarëve të Rumanisë
- Founded: 30 June 1999
- Ideology: Albanian minority interests
- National affiliation: National Minorities Parliamentary Group
- Chamber of Deputies: 1 / 330

Website
- alar.ro

The League of Albanians of Romania (Romanian: Liga Albanezilor din România, ALAR; Albanian: Lidhja e shqiptarëve të Rumanisë, LSR) is an ethnic minority political party in Romania representing the Albanian community.

== History ==
The ALAR was established on 30 June 1999. In the 2000 general elections it defeated the Cultural Union of Albanians of Romania to win the single seat reserved for the Albanian community in the Chamber of Deputies under the electoral law allowing political parties representing ethnic minority groups to be exempt from the electoral threshold only applied as long as they received 10% of the vote required for a single seat in the Chamber of Deputies. It has retained its seat in every election since.

== Election results ==
Election	Chamber of Deputies			Senate		
Election	Votes	%	Seats	Votes	%	Seats
2000	10,543	0.10	1	–	–	–
2004	5,011	0.05	1			
2008	8,792	0.13	1	–	–	–
2012	10,010	0.14	1	–	–	–
2016	4,640	0.07	1	–	–	–
2020	9,029	0.15	1	–	–	–
