= George Ghica =

Prince of Moldavia from 1658 to 1659

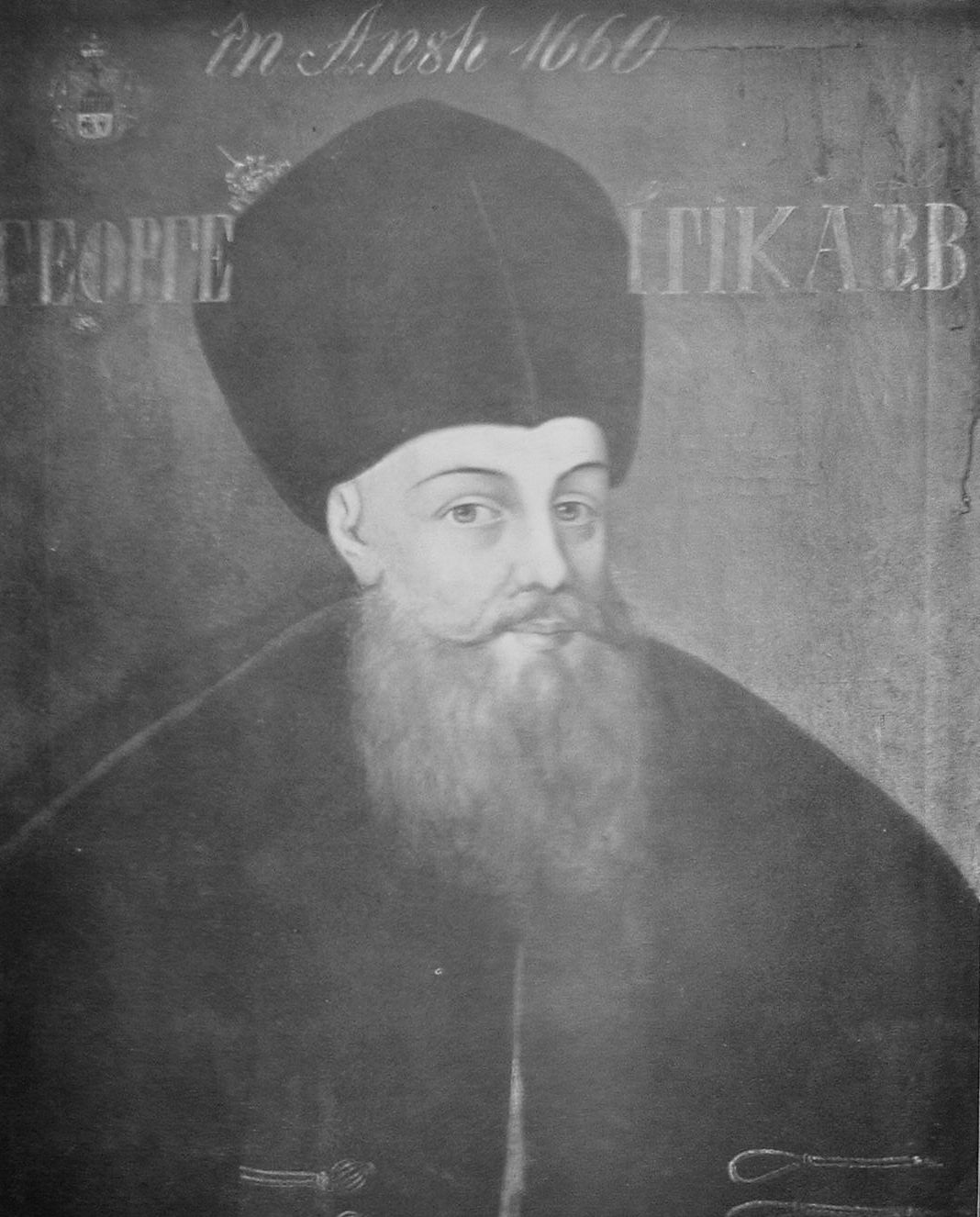

Prince of Moldavia
- Reign: 3 March 1658 – 2 November 1659
- Predecessor: Gheorghe Ștefan
- Successor: Constantin Șerban

Prince of Wallachia
- Reign: 20 November 1659 – 1 November 1660
- Predecessor: Mihnea III
- Successor: Grigore I Ghica
- Born: 3 March 1600; Köprülü, Rumelia Eyalet, Ottoman Empire
- Died: 2 November 1664 (aged 64); Constantinople, Ottoman Empire
- Spouse: Smaragda (Smada) Lâna
- Issue: Grigore I Ghica
- Dynasty: Ghica
- Father: Matei Ghica
- Religion: Eastern Orthodox

George Ghica (Albanian: Gjergj Gjika, Romanian: Gheorghe Ghica; 3 March 1600 – 2 November 1664) was prince of Moldavia from 1658 to 1659 and prince of Wallachia from 1659 to 1660. He founded the albanian Ghica family. He was born in the city of Koprulu, Rumelia, Ottoman Empire, in 1600 (Today part of the Republic of North Macedonia).

While in Istanbul, he became close friends with the Grand Vizier Köprülü Mehmed Pasha and helped him on to high positions. As Prince of Wallachia he moved the capital from Târgoviște to Bucharest.

From him are descended the numerous branches of the family which became notable in the history of Moldavia and Wallachia. His son was Grigore I Ghica.

Preceded by Gheorghe Stefan	Prince/Voivode of Moldavia; 1658–1659	Succeeded by Constantin Serban
Preceded by Mihnea III	Prince of Wallachia; 1659–1660	Succeeded by Grigore I Ghica

== Bibliography ==
- Cernovodeanu, Paul (1982). "Ştiri privitoare la Gheorghe Ghica vodă al Moldovei ( 1658– 1659 ) şi la familia sa (I)". Anuarul Institutului de Istorie și Arheologie "A.D. Xenopol." (in Romanian). 19. Institutul de Istorie și Arheologie "A.D. Xenopol.".
- Wasiucionek, Michal (2012). "Ethnic solidary in the wider Ottoman Empire revisited: cins and local political elites in 17th century Moldavia and Wallachia". In Sariyannis, Marinos (ed.). New Trends in Ottoman Studies: Papers presented at the 20th CIÉPO Symposium Rethymno, 27 June – 1 July 2012. University of Crete – Department of History and Archaeology.
- Wasiucionek, Michal (2016). Politics and Watermelons: Cross-Border Political Networks in the Polish-Moldavian-Ottoman Context in the Seventeenth Century (PDF) (Thesis). European University Institute.
