= Grigore I Ghica =

Prince of Wallachia (1628–1675)

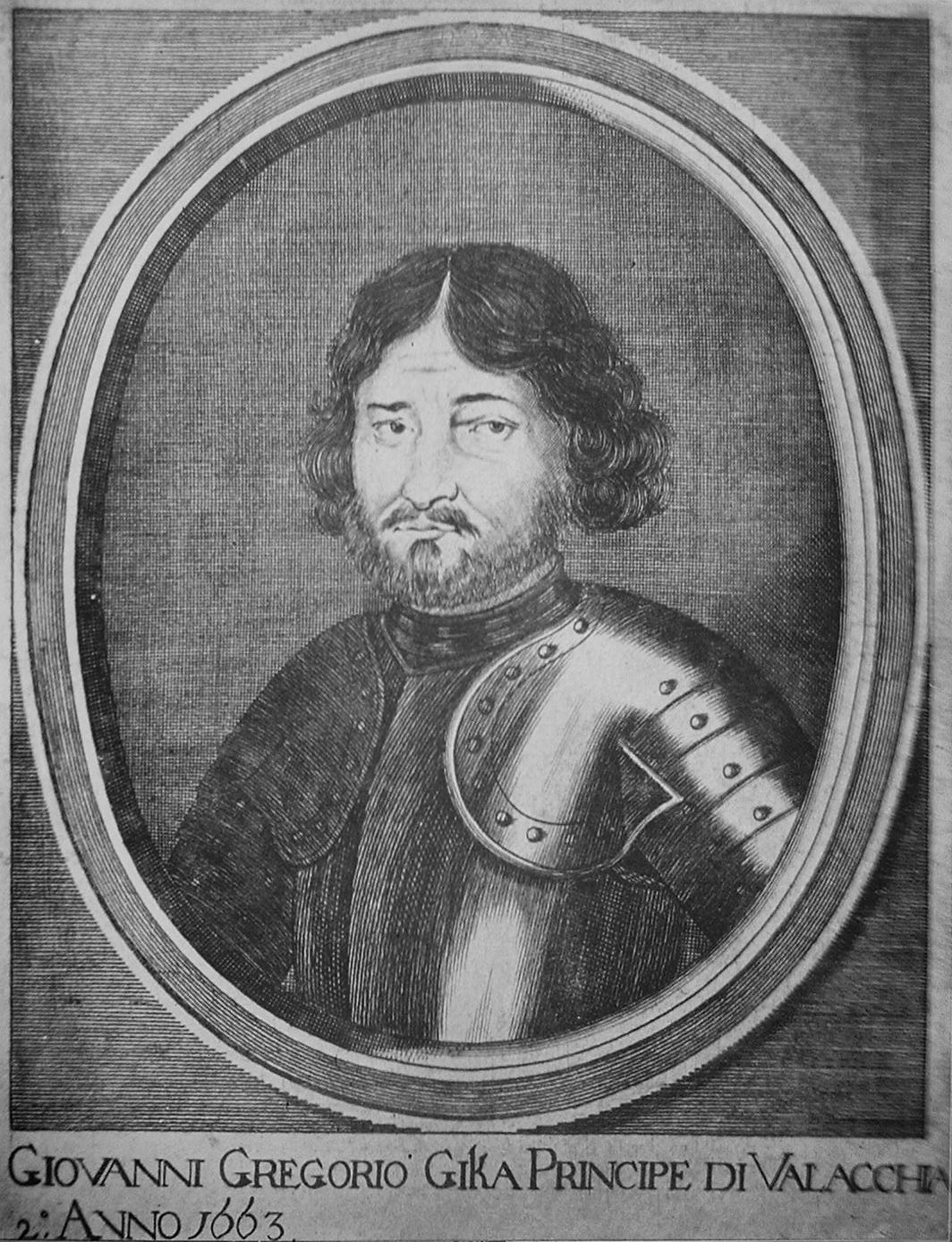

Prince of Wallachia (1st reign)
- Reign: 1 September 1660 – December 1664
- Predecessor: George Ghica
- Successor: Radu Leon

Prince of Wallachia (2nd reign)
- Reign: March 1672 – November 1673
- Predecessor: Antonie Vodă din Popești
- Successor: George Ducas
- Born: 1628
- Died: 1675 (aged 46–47); Istanbul
- Spouse: Maria
- Issue: Matei Ghica
- House: Ghica family
- Father: George Ghica
- Religion: Orthodox

Grigore I Ghica (1628 – 1675), a member of the Ghica family, was the prince of Wallachia between September 1660 and December 1664 and again between March 1672 and November 1673.

His father was George Ghica, ruler of Moldavia (1658–59) and ruler of Wallachia (1659–60).

In 1661 he established a monastery in Focșani.

== Family ==
He married Maria, daughter of Matei Sturdza.

His son was

- Matei Ghica, father of
  - Grigore II Ghica and
  - Alexandru Ghica, father of
    - Grigore III Ghica and
    - Ecaterina Ghica. Her great-grandson is Grigore Alexandru Ghica.

Preceded by Gheorghe Ghica	Prince of Wallachia; 1660–1664	Succeeded by Radu Leon
Preceded by Antonie Vodă din Popeşti	Prince of Wallachia; 1672–1673	Succeeded by George Ducas
