= Grigore II Ghica =

Romanian prince; Voivode of Moldavia and Wallachia (1695–1752)

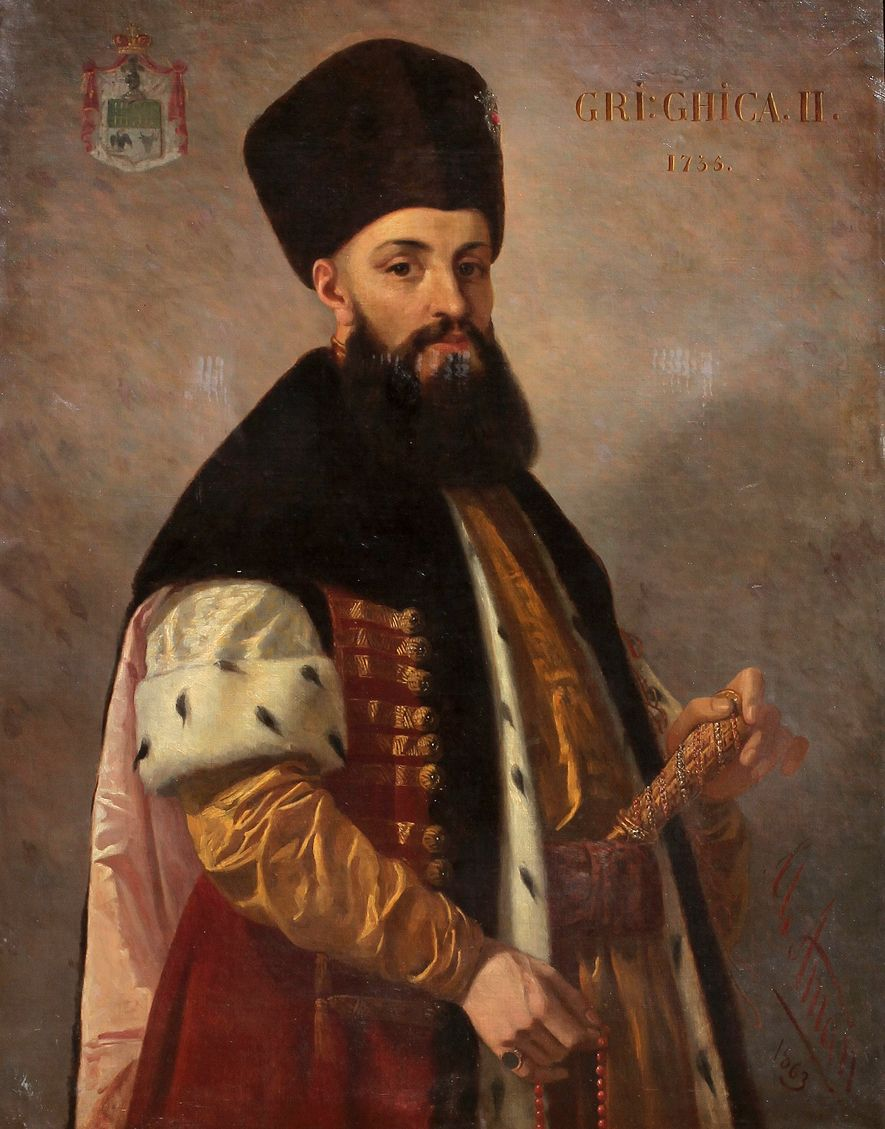
- Portrait by Theodor Aman, 1863

Prince of Moldavia (1st reign)
- Reign: 5 October 1726 – 16 April 1733
- Predecessor: Mihai Racoviță
- Successor: Constantine Mavrocordatos

Prince of Wallachia (1st reign)
- Reign: 16 April 1733 – 27 November 1735
- Predecessor: Constantine Mavrocordatos
- Successor: Constantine Mavrocordatos

Prince of Moldavia (2nd reign)
- Reign: 27 November 1735 – 14 September 1739
- Predecessor: Constantine Mavrocordatos
- Successor: Russian occupation

Prince of Moldavia (3rd reign)
- Reign: 24 October 1739 – 10 September 1741
- Predecessor: Russian occupation
- Successor: Constantine Mavrocordatos

Prince of Moldavia (4th reign)
- Reign: May 1747 – April 1748
- Predecessor: John Mavrocordatos
- Successor: Constantine Mavrocordatos

Prince of Wallachia (2nd reign)
- Reign: April 1748 – 3 September 1752
- Predecessor: Constantine Mavrocordatos
- Successor: Matei Ghica
- Born: 1695; Istanbul
- Died: 3 September 1752 (aged 56–57); Bucharest
- Issue: Scarlat Ghica, Matei Ghica
- House: Ghica family
- Father: Matei Ghica
- Religion: Orthodox

Grigore II Ghica (1695 – 3 September 1752) was Voivode (Prince) of Moldavia at four different intervals — from October 1726 to April 16, 1733, from November 27, 1735 to 14 September 1739, from October 1739 to September 1741 and from May 1747 to April 1748 — and twice Voivode (Prince) of Wallachia: April 16, 1733 – November 27, 1735 and April 1748 to September 3, 1752. He was son of Matei Ghica (son of Grigore I Ghica).

== Reigns ==
He was helped to gain the throne in Iași by previous Prince Nicolae Mavrocordat, upon Mihai Racoviță's deposition by the Ottoman overlord. He decreased taxes, but chose to continue the established policy of awarding offices to Greeks and Levantines instead of local boyars. Thus, he faced mounting opposition from Dimitrie Racoviță, who tried to remove Scarlat by enlisting Budjak Tatars' help – he was however rejected after clashing with Ghica and his Wallachian and Ottoman allies. With the outbreak of the Russo-Turkish War came Imperial Russian occupation, forcing Grigore II Ghica to leave Moldavia briefly, in September–October 1739.

Although he tried to counter Constantin Mavrocordat's intrigue at the Porte, Ghica was deposed and exiled in 1741, gaining the throne for a final, brief time in 1747–1748. He effectively purchased the throne in Bucharest — the exorbitant payment made him rely on further increased taxation.

== Legacy ==
He repaired several monasteries and built the Frumoasa one in Iași, and the one at Pantelimon – the church's patron saint, Panteleimon, is the eponym for both the commune Pantelimon, Ilfov, on the edge of Bucharest, and the Pantelimon Quarter of the capital. Ghica also built and furnished the area's hospital (staffed with Eastern Orthodox monks), the basis for the modern one.

He had two sons Scarlat Ghica and Matei Ghica.

Preceded by John Mavrocordatos	Grand Dragoman of the Porte; 1717–1726	Succeeded by Alexander Ghica
Preceded by Mihai Racoviţă	Prince of Moldavia; 1726–1733	Succeeded by Constantin Mavrocordat
Preceded by Constantin Mavrocordat	Prince of Moldavia; 1735–1739	Succeeded by Russian occupation
Preceded by Russian occupation	Prince of Moldavia; 1739–1741	Succeeded by Constantin Mavrocordat
Preceded by Ioan Mavrocordat	Prince of Moldavia; 1747–1748	Succeeded by Constantin Mavrocordat

Preceded by Constantin Mavrocordat	Prince/Voivode of Wallachia; 1733–1735	Succeeded by Constantin Mavrocordat
Preceded by Constantin Mavrocordat	Prince/Voivode of Wallachia; 1748–1752	Succeeded by Matei Ghica
