= Ruxandra Lupu =

Romanian princess

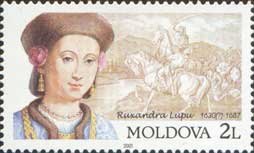
Ruxandra Lupu on a Moldovan stamp

Ruxandra Lupu (also Roksana, Rozanda, Roxanda) (1630–1686) was a Moldavian princess.

She was born to Lady Tudosca and Vasile Lupu, the voivode of Moldavia. In the midst of intense political - and military - manoeuvring, her father was forced to betrothe her to the son of the Cossack hetman Bohdan Khmelnytsky, after Bohdan had invaded Moldavia. Vasile Lupu tried to prevent the marriage from taking place, as it would damage his Polish alliances. He was appointed a part of the Polish nobility, and in return swore to not allow the marriage to occur.

Even the Polish army became involved, however, after the army suffered defeat to the Cossacks, no intervention was possible. In 1652, Ruxandra married Bohdan Khmelnytsky's son Tymofiy Khmelnytsky. The groom died a year later, from an infected battle-wound.

Ruxandra's eventual fate is unclear. Some tellings purport that, many years later, she was captured and beheaded by Polish forces.
