= Gheorghe Ștefan =

Prince of Moldavia from 1653 to 1658

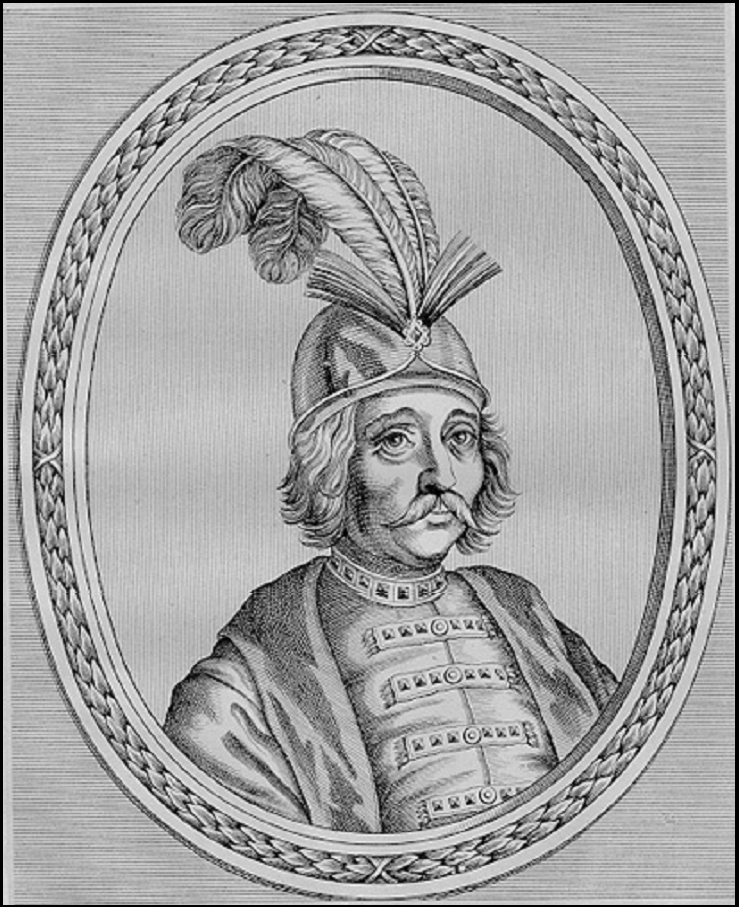

Prince of Moldavia (1st reign)
- Reign: 13 April – 8 May 1653
- Predecessor: Vasile Lupu
- Successor: Vasile Lupu

Prince of Moldavia (2nd reign)
- Reign: 16 July 1653 – 13 March 1658
- Predecessor: Vasile Lupu
- Successor: George Ghica
- Died: 1668; Szczecin
- Father: Dumitrașcu Ceaur
- Religion: Eastern Orthodox

Gheorghe Ștefan (István Görgicze, seldom referred to as Burduja; died 1668) was the voivode (prince) of Moldavia between 13 April and 8 May 1653, and again from 16 July 1653 to 13 March 1658; he was the son of boyar Dumitrașcu Ceaur; Gheorghe Ștefan was Chancellor (logofăt) during the reign of Vasile Lupu. His original name was István Görgicze and is mentioned by this name in many sources. However, due to the difficulty of pronouncing his surname and for certain sources to simplify it, they renamed him Georghe Stephan, referring to the origin of his ancestors from medieval Georgia (Imereti area) or Colchis (Kolkhis, land of the legendary Golden Fleece). Nevertheless, all name variations he is mentioned by (Gorgidze, Georgidze, Gergidze, Gergicze, Girgice, Georgicze) mean son of George, representing a historical connection to old Caucasian roots. See sources below.

== Biography ==
Citing Vasile's reliance on his Greek and Levantine retinue, as well as an alleged dishonoring of his wife by the Prince, he allied himself with Wallachian Prince Matei Basarab and Transylvanian ruler George II Rákóczi. He managed to expel Vasile Lupu, but the latter was helped to regain his position by Bohdan Khmelnytsky's force (under the command of the Hetman's son Tymofiy/Tymish), sent to Moldavia to depose him. Tymish and Lupu followed him to Wallachia, but their armies were crushed by Matei Basarab in the Battle of Finta. Gheorghe Ştefan regained Iași and remained on the throne, making sure that the Ottoman power was appeased - he bought his power in Constantinople, having to increase taxes in order to cover the expenses, and pay for the maintenance of his large mercenary force.

The Turks grew weary of Gheorghe Ștefan's natural alliance with Transylvania and Wallachia (cemented in 1655 by the help he offered to Constantin Șerban in crushing the rebellion of the seimeni in Bucharest), in which they saw the seeds of emancipation. The Sultan Mehmed Dördüncü was irritated further by the active part Moldavia played in Polish matters during The Deluge, in the same camp as Sweden, the Cossack Hetmanate, Brandenburg and Wallachia. Mehmed understood this to be a step towards the challenge of his own rule: in 1658, he deposed all three subject rulers (Rákóczi, Gheorghe Ștefan, Constantin Șerban), bringing Gheorghe I Ghica as replacement in Iași. All three decided to resist, but Gheorghe Ștefan was defeated at Strunga (Iași County), being discarded from the alliance in favor of Mihnea III of Wallachia.

After the unsuccessful war, he found friends and supporters in the Kingdom of Hungary, where he became a Hungarian noble by law according to the Act CXXXIII of 1659 (4. §).

The Prince wandered through Poland and Habsburg lands (1662), Brandenburg, Muscovy and Sweden (1665), seeking to find backing for his return. Severely ill and bankrupt, he ended his life in Pomerania. His remains were brought back by his wife, and are thought to be buried at Cașin Monastery.

== Bibliography ==
- Österreichische Geschichts-Quellen: Scriptores. Erste Abtheilung, p. 199, at Google Books
- Fontes Rerum Austriacarum, p. 199, at Google Books
- Gróf Mikó Imre, Szabó Károly: Erdély Történelmi Adatok, p. 156, at Google Books
- Kispál László: Erdély fejedelmi korszaka at Google Books
- Báró Jósika Miklós: II. Rákóczy Ferencz at Google Books

Regnal titles
Preceded by Vasile Lupu	Prince/Voivode of Moldavia; 1653	Succeeded by Vasile Lupu
Preceded by Vasile Lupu	Prince/Voivode of Moldavia; 1653–1658	Succeeded by Gheorghe I Ghica
