= Ștefăniță Lupu =

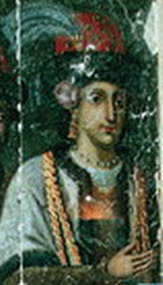

Prince of Moldavia (1st reign)
- Reign: 1 December 1659 – January 1661
- Predecessor: Constantin Șerban
- Successor: Constantin Șerban

Prince of Moldavia (2nd reign)
- Reign: 27 February – 29 September 1661
- Predecessor: Constantin Șerban
- Successor: Eustratie Dabija
- Born: 1641; Iași
- Died: 29 September 1661 (aged 19–20); Bender
- Father: Vasile Lupu
- Mother: Ecaterina Cercheza
- Religion: Orthodox

Ştefăniţă Lupu, nicknamed Papură-Vodă (1641 – 29 September 1661), son of Vasile Lupu, was Voivode (Prince) of Moldavia between 1659 and 1661, and again in 1661.

== Life ==
Appointed by the Porte as a result of his father's efforts (during their exile in Istanbul), Ştefăniţă took over the throne at the age of 16. His rule was twice overthrown by former Wallachian Prince Constantin Şerban, who occupied Iaşi and took over as Voivode. These harassments, coupled with Ottoman demands and Tatar raids, caused a deep crisis in Moldavia, worsened by an epidemic of what was thought to be the bubonic plague.

The ensuing famine accounts for Ştefăniţă's moniker: resources would have been so scarce that people resorted to grinding typha, and baking it as bread.

The Prince ended his life due to an illness, while assisting Turks and Tatars in fortifying Budjak against Cossacks.

== See also ==
Ancestors of Ștefăniță Lupu

4. Nicolai Coci
2. Vasile Lupu
1. Ştefăniţă Lupu
24. Bogdan II of Moldavia
12. Stephen III of Moldavia
25. Oltea
6. Peter IV Rareș
26. Răreș
13. (illegitimate) Maria Răreșoaia of Hârlău
3. ?

Preceded by Constantin Şerban	Prince/Voivode of Moldavia; 1659–1661	Succeeded by Constantin Şerban
Preceded by Constantin Şerban	Prince/Voivode of Moldavia; 1661	Succeeded by Eustratie Dabija
