= Vasile Lupu =

Prince of Moldavia from 1634 to 1653

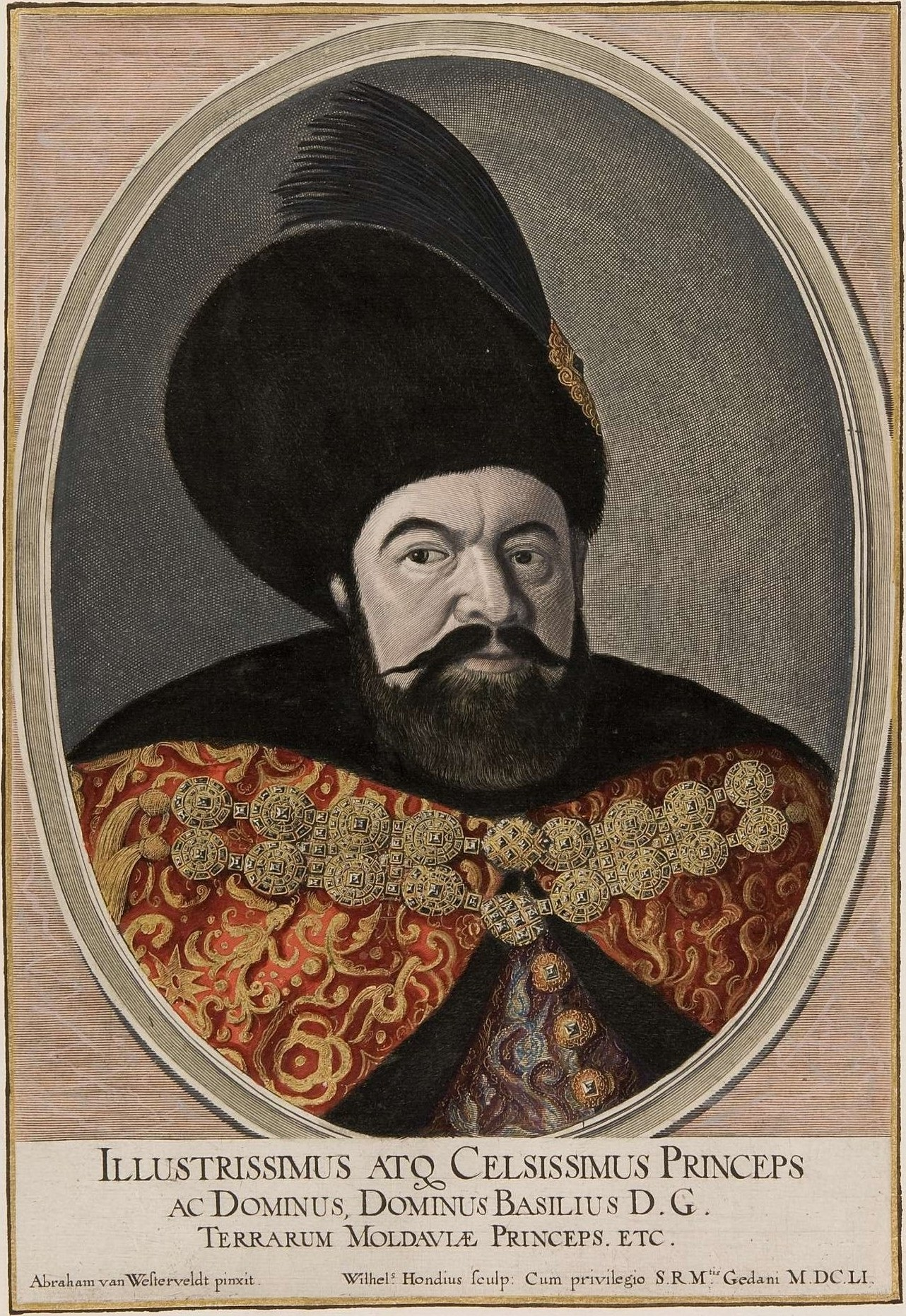

Prince of Moldavia (1st reign)
- Reign: April 1634 – 13 April 1653
- Predecessor: Moise Movilă
- Successor: Gheorghe Ștefan

Prince of Moldavia (2nd reign)
- Reign: 8 May – 16 July 1653
- Predecessor: Gheorghe Ștefan
- Successor: Gheorghe Ștefan
- Born: 1595; Arbanasi
- Died: 1661 (aged 65–66); Constantinople
- Issue: Ștefăniță Lupu; Ruxandra Lupu; Maria Lupu
- Father: Neculai
- Religion: Orthodox

The Coat of arms of Vasile Lupu.

Lupu Coci, known as Vasile Lupu (Romanian pronunciation: [vaˈsile ˈlupu]; 1595 – 1661), was the voivode of Moldavia between 1634 and 1653. He was of Albanian and Greek origin. Lupu had secured the Moldavian throne in 1634 after a series of complicated intrigues and managed to hold it for twenty years. Vasile was a capable administrator and a brilliant financier and was soon almost the richest man in the Christian East. His gifts to Ottoman leaders kept him on good terms with the Ottoman authorities.

== Early life ==
The Coci family settled in Wallachia (Țara Românească) in the first half of the 16th century. His father, Nicolae (Neculai) Coci was an Albanian shopkeeper, the son of Constantin (Coce) and Ecaterina, who originated from Macedonia or Epirus. His mother was Greek. Nicolae entered Moldavian nobility in 1593. Nikolae was born in Arbanasi. According to different researchers it was a village in modern-day Bulgaria (Arbanasi or Dolno Arbanasi - today a suburb of Razgrad), while some historians claim Arbănași (modern Romania). Vasile Lupu received Greek education.

== Reign ==
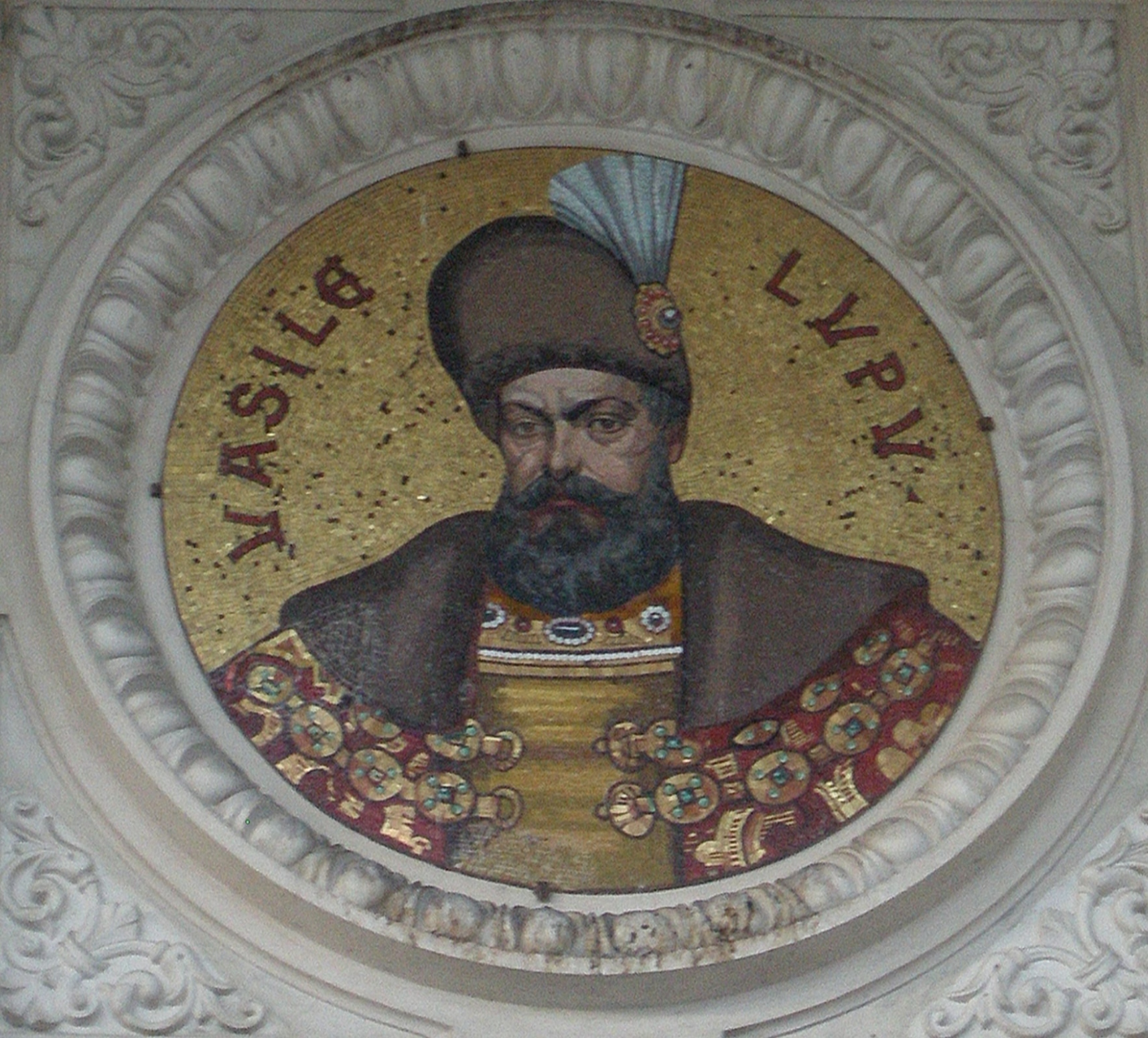
Portrait of Vasile Lupu on the Romanian Athaeneum wall.

Lupu had held a high office under Miron Barnovschi, and was subsequently selected Prince as a sign of indigenous boyars' reaction against Greek and Levantine competition. This was because Vasile Lupu had led a rebellion against Alexandru Iliaș and his foreign retinue, being led into exile by Moise Movilă (although he was backed by Prince Matei Basarab and the powerful Pasha of Silistra, Abaza Mehmed Pasha). Despite having led the rebellion against Greek influence, Lupu maintained strong ties to the Greeks and the Patriarchate of Constantinople. He pursued a Greek-Orthodox policy and sought to become the new Byzantine Emperor.

His rule was marked by splendor and pomp. He was a builder of notable monuments (the unique Trei Ierarhi Monastery in Iași and the St. Paraskeva Church, Lviv, among others), a patron of culture and arts founding the Academia Vasiliană). These acts also had negative effects, the tax burdens being increased to an intolerable level.

After relations between the two Princes soured, Vasile Lupu spent much of his reign fighting the Wallachian Matei Basarab, trying to impose his son Ioan to the throne in Bucharest. His army was defeated twice in 1639 at Ojogeni and Nenișori and a third time, at Finta, in 1653. After this last battle, the Moldavian boyars rebelled and replaced him with the Wallachian favorite, Gheorghe Ștefan. Vasile Lupu went into exile and died while being kept in Turkish custody at Yedikule prison in Constantinople.

Lupu built a strong alliance with hetman Bohdan Khmelnytsky, arranging the marriage of his own daughter Ruxandra Lupu to Khmelnytsky's son Tymofiy (Tymish), who went on to fight alongside Lupu at Finta.

Vasile Lupu made alliances with Ottoman officials, in particular with former Grand Vizier Tabanıyassı Mehmed Pasha. Lupu's association with the latter relied on their common Albanian origin.

=== Laws and reforms ===
Vasile Lupu introduced the first codified printed law in Moldavia, the Carte Românească de învățătură ("Romanian book of learning", 1646, published in Iași), known as the Pravila lui Vasile Lupu ("Vasile Lupu's code"). The document follows Byzantine tradition, being a translated review of customs and almost identical to its Wallachian contemporary equivalent.

=== Endowments ===
Lupu founded churches and monasteries throughout his lands. The liturgical language was described as "vulgar Greek" by Robert Bargrave who travelled the lands.

=== Education ===
Lupu founded the Princely High School of Trei lerarhi Church in 1640, which taught in Greek and Latin.

== Family ==
The Coci last name was carried on by Stefan Coci (son of Vasile Lupu) who married the daughter of Petru Rareș, a voivode of Moldavia, but also by the descendant of Gabriel Coci named Hatmanul. The descending line of Coci intersects with aristocratic families from Moldavia, old families such as the Bucioc, Boulesti, and Abazesti.

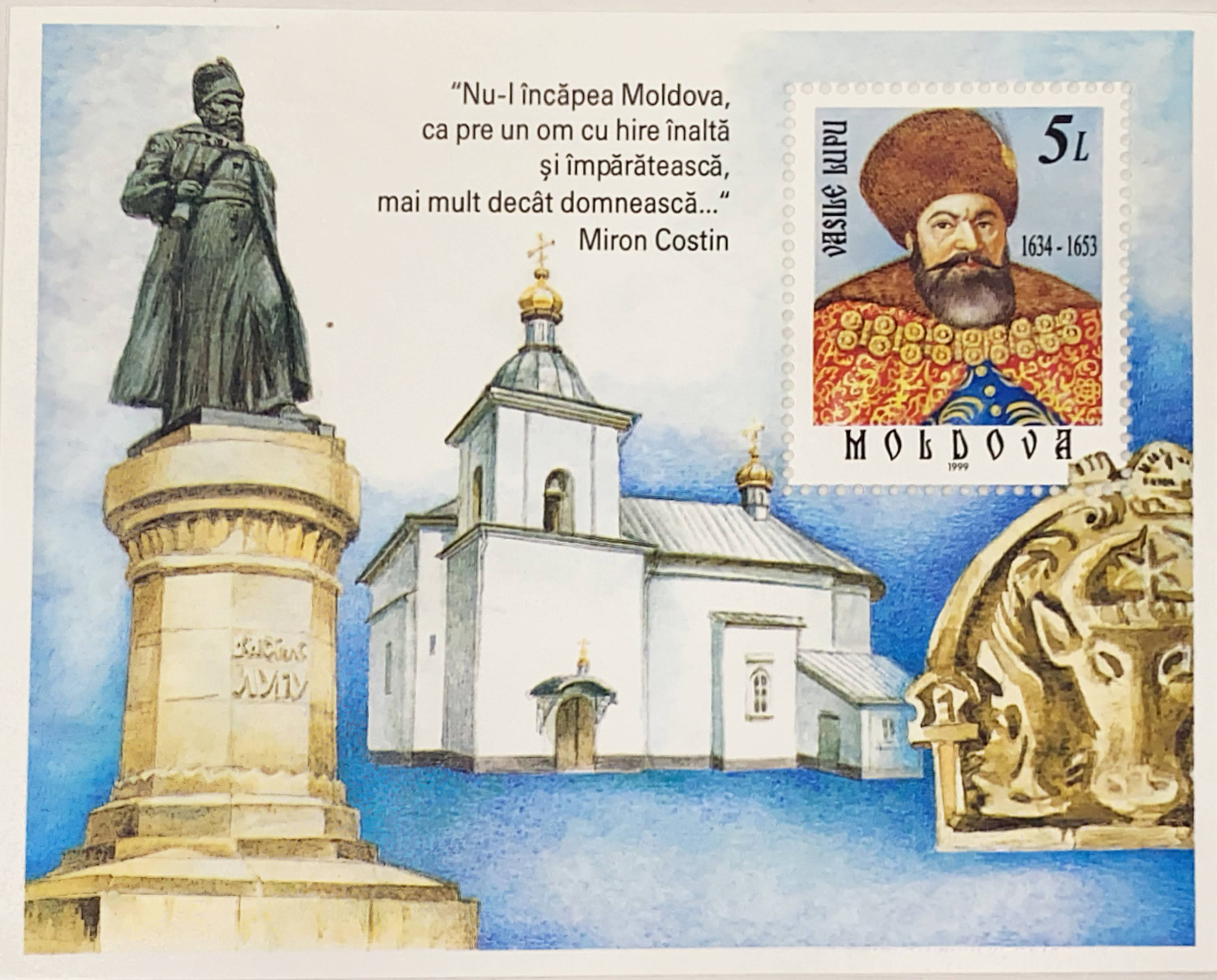
Vasile Lupu in a Moldovan stamp of 1999

== Representation in postal stamps ==
Vasile Lupu is depicted in a stamp issued by the Post of Moldova in 1999 and in a stamp of Romania issued in 2019.

== See also ==
- Synod of Iași
- Trei Ierarhi Monastery
- St. Paraskeva Church, Lviv

== Sources ==
- Runciman, Steven (1985). The Great Church in Captivity: A Study of the Patriarchate of Constantinople from the Eve of the Turkish Conquest to the Greek War of Independence. Cambridge University Press. pp. 286–7, 341–3, 370. ISBN 978-0-521-31310-0.
- George Ioan Brătianu (1995). Sfatul domnesc și adunarea stărilor în principatele române. Editura Enciclopedică. ISBN 978-973-45-0096-3.
- N.Jorga "Byzance apres Byzance, pp. 163–181

Preceded by Moise Movilă	Prince/Voivode of Moldavia; April 1634–April 1653	Succeeded by Gheorghe Ștefan
Preceded by Gheorghe Ștefan	Prince/Voivode of Moldavia; May–June 1653	Succeeded by Gheorghe Ștefan
