= List of ports in Romania =

The following is a list of major ports in Romania.

== On the Black Sea ==
- Port of Constanța
- Port of Mangalia
- Port of Midia
- Port of Sulina

== On the Danube–Black Sea Canal ==
- Port of Basarabi
- Port of Luminița
- Port of Medgidia
- Port of Ovidiu

== On the Danube River ==
- Port of Bechet
- Port of Brăila
- Port of Calafat
- Port of Călărași
- Port of Cernavodă
- Port of Corabia
- Port of Drencova
- Port of Drobeta Turnu Severin
- Port of Galați
- Port of Giurgiu
- Port of Isaccea
- Port of Moldova Veche
- Port of Oltenița
- Port of Orșova
- Port of Tulcea
- Port of Turnu Măgurele
- Port of Zimnicea
