= Wallachian military forces =

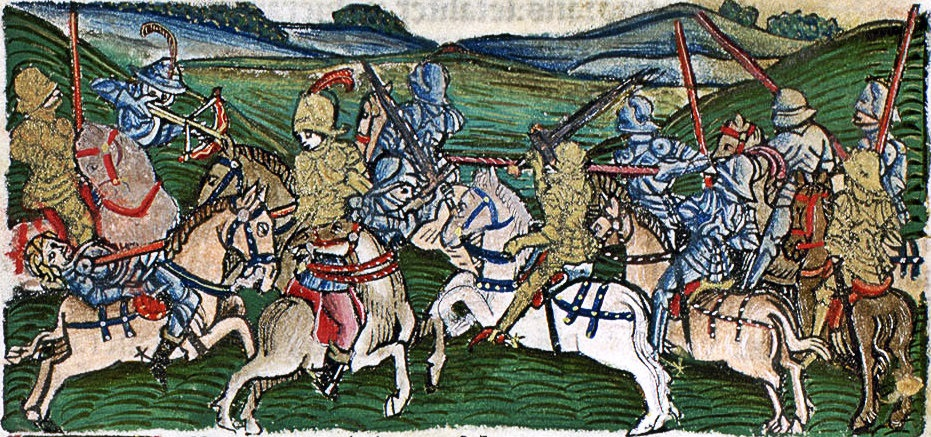
The Battle of Posada depicted in Chronica Hungarorum (1488)

The military of Wallachia existed throughout the history of the country. Starting from its founding to 1859, when it was united with the Moldavian army into what would become the Romanian Army.

The army mainly consisted of light cavalry which was used in hit-and-run tactics, though various other units existed as well. Between the 16th and 18th centuries, the army was mostly formed from mercenary units. In 1830, following the Organic Regulation, the standing army of Wallachia was created.

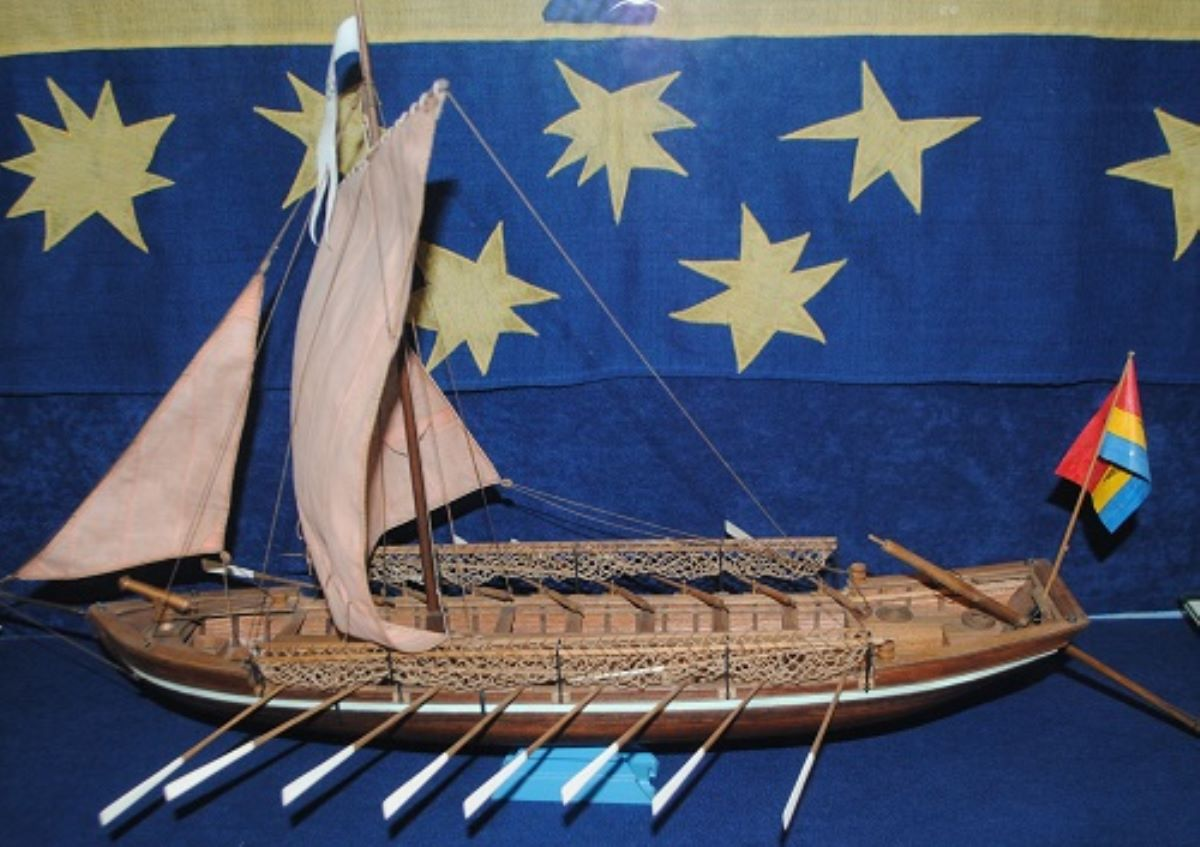
Scale model of an 1845 Quarter Șaică

The Wallachian fleet used riverboats of various sizes between the 15th and 17th centuries. In 1794, a small flotilla was created with the approval of The Porte. After the regulations of 1830, a military flotilla was created as well. The Wallachian flotilla was merged with the Moldavian one in 1860, forming the Danube Flotilla Corps, the precursor of the Romanian Naval Forces.

== Middle Ages ==
=== Before the establishment of Wallachia ===
Before the formation of a Wallachian state, some Romanian leaders controlled lands south of the Carpathians. During the Mongol invasion of Europe, two such leaders, Bezerenbam and Mișelav, fought against the invading Mongol armies. Bezerenbam's army was defeated in the Ilaut Country, while Mișelav's army was defeated by Budjek.

In 1277, the Wallachian voivode Litovoi, first mentioned in the Diploma of the Joannites, fought against the Hungarians over the lands claimed by the Hungarian crown. Litovoi was killed in the battle, and his brother, Bărbat, was captured and forced to pay a ransom and recognize Hungarian rule.

=== 14th–15th centuries ===
One of the first military actions after the founding of Wallachia was the Battle of Velbazhd in 1330. There, an army led by Basarab I fought alongside the Bulgarians. The battle ended in a defeat.

==== Wars against Hungary ====
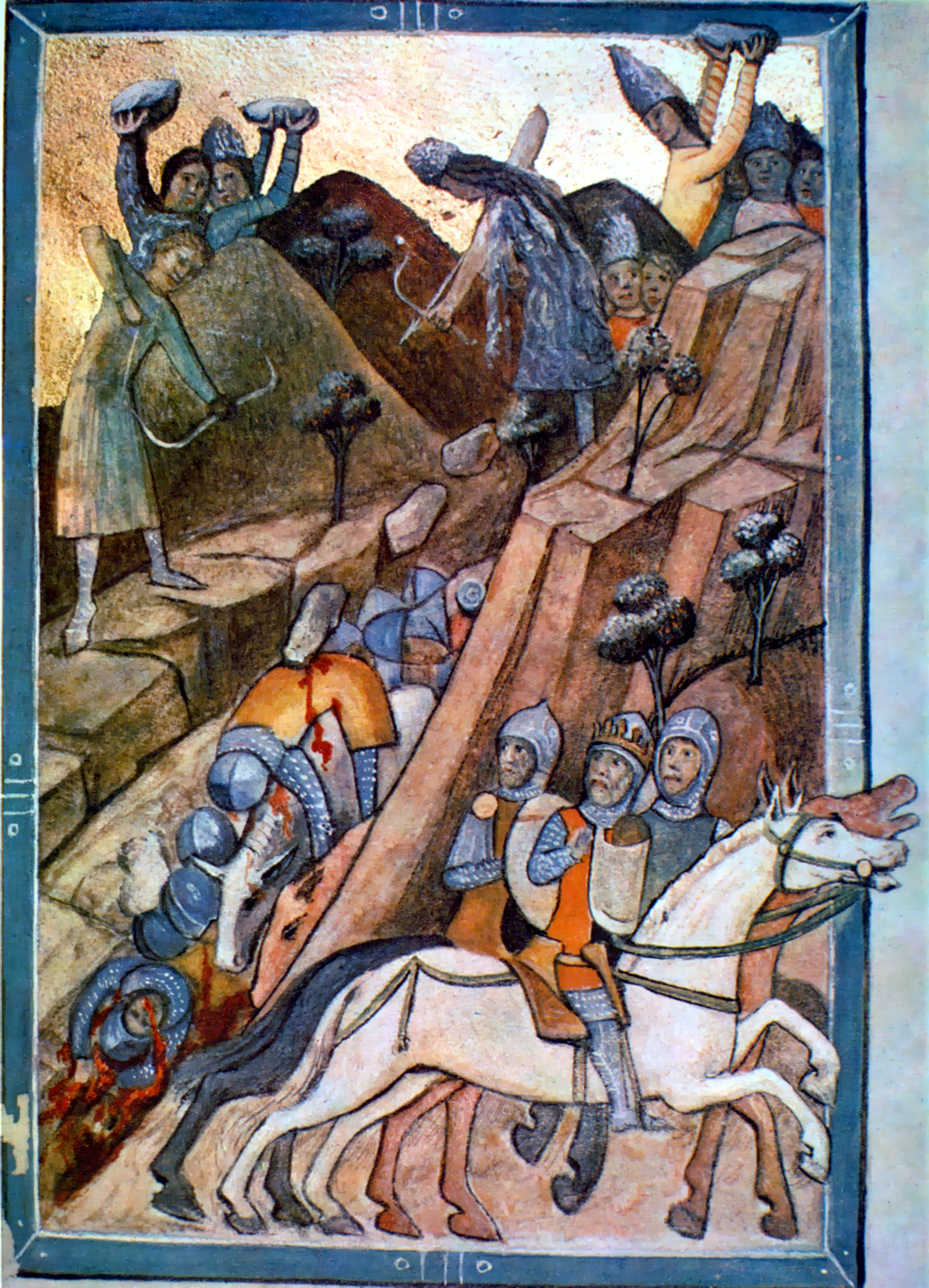
The Battle of Posada as depicted in Chronicon Pictum

In the same year, Wallachia was invaded by Charles I of Hungary who was seeking to recapture the "marginal lands" held by Basarab. The Hungarian royal army captured Severin in September, appointing Dionysius Széchy as Ban. Due to the poor supplies of Charles' army, he was compelled to sign an armistice and retreat from Wallachia. His army was ambushed by Basarab in a mountain valley on 9 November. According to historian Constantin Rezachevici, in the first phase of the battle, which lasted two days, the Hungarian army was stopped in the valley and attacked with ranged weapons. The last two days of battle were primarily fought in melee combat, which marked the character of the battle. While portrayed only as peasants armed with bows and rocks in the Illuminated Chronicle, the Wallachian army of Basarab was just as well equipped as the King's army, as noted by Stephen, the son of the Cuman Ispán Parabuh.

Wars with Hungary continued during the reign of Vladislav Vlaicu, with Vlaicu defeating an army led by Nicholas Lackfi on the Ialomița valley in the autumn of 1368. In 1369, the Voivode captured the Hungarian-occupied city of Vidin to restore its ruler, Ivan Sratsimir. However, following the successful campaign of Louis I in the summer of the same year, he had to submit to the Hungarian king.

Launching another offensive against Wallachia after escalating religious tensions, Louis managed to take the Banate of Severin in 1375 from Vladislav who in turn allied himself with Ivan Shishman of Bulgaria and Murad I. Still, the King failed to bring Vladislav under his rule and the Voivode took back Severin in 1377. For a battle against the Hungarians, Vladislav's successor, Radu I, equipped his army with armour from Venice as described in Cronaca Carrarese by Galeazzo and Bartolomeo Gatari. His army was defeated, however, in the clash according to the chronicle, although the Hungarian campaign of 1377 was unsuccessful in bringing Radu under the rule of the Hungarian crown.

==== Wars against the Ottomans ====
The first battles with the Ottomans took place during the reign of Vladislav Vlaicu. Shortly after reinstalling Ivan Sratsimir in Vidin, Vlaicu had to fight against Tsar Ivan Alexander of Bulgaria who was attempting to take control of the city with Ottoman support. During the successful campaign of Vladislav, the knight (Note: "strennuus miles" ("brave knight") as he was referred to in a 1372 charter by Vladislav Vlaicu) Ladislaus Dobokai distinguished himself in the fighting against the Turks. Voivode Vlaicu also joined Ivan Sratsimir and Louis I of Hungary in a crusade against the Ottomans and Bulgarians in February-March 1371, which resulted in the capture of Sofia.

During the reign of Mircea the Elder, Wallachia faced the Ottomans again. A victory was achieved at the Battle of Rovine, and Mircea also participated in the Battle of Nicopolis. In 1430, a document issued by King Sigismund of Luxembourg mentioned that Wallachia and Moldavia could raise an army of 10,000 pancerati, (Note: "Panceratus" meaning "armoured soldier".) and in 1448 a contingent of 4,000 archers led by the Voivode participated in the Battle of Kosovo.

In 1444, a contingent of 4,000 Wallachian cavalrymen, according to Jan Długosz, under the command of Mircea II aided King Vladislaus of Poland and Hungary in the Crusade of Varna. According to Michael Beheim, the Wallachians participated in the siege of Petricha fortress, with Mircea ordering his troops to bring up ladders and scale the walls. Failing the direct assault, the Wallachians intercepted the Turks who were attempting to flee through a secret tunnel after the Hungarian cannons had breached the walls. During the Battle of Varna, the Wallachian banner fought on the right flank of the crusader army, later breaking away, likely following an order from John Hunyadi, and engaging the Ottomans on the left to prevent a flanking maneuver. Breaking through the Ottoman flank, the Wallachians stopped for plunder and left the battlefield after being threatened with the killing of Mircea's two brothers.

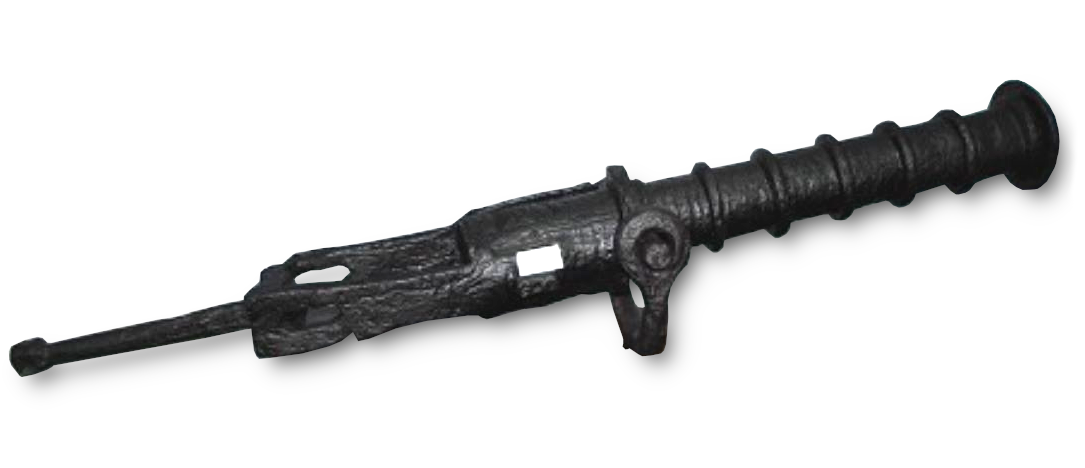
15th century culverin, like the ones used in Vlad's time (Note: The culverin was found near a shipwreck in Mangalia, however similar guns were found in Wallachia as well.)

Due to the constant internal and external conflicts, Vlad Dracula organized a small army of 6,000 to 8,000 soldiers composed of small land owners, boyars, courtiers, and a hired personal guard of trabants from Transylvania. Vlad also made use of artillery, which was likely operated by foreign mercenaries.

With this army, Vlad campaigned against the Transylvanian Saxons who supported his rivals. He also defeated an Ottoman army led by Hamza Bey in 1460. In 1462, Vlad launched a campaign south of the Danube. Dividing his army into six columns, he attacked strategic settlements near the river. Vlad led the army heading towards Nicopolis. During this offensive, he utilized culverins in his attack on Svishtov, and also destroyed a number of 50 Ottoman ships. During the night attack on Mehmet's camp near Târgoviște in 1462, the Voivode's army took heavy losses.

==== The large host ====
The large host (oastea cea mare) was an army that consisted of peasants and city dwellers. The number of soldiers in this army could reach 30 to 40,000. Once the Prince ordered the call to arms, special envoys were dispatched to the territory to deliver the message. Territorial governors (vornici de județ and vornici de târg) then passed the call to arms to villages and towns. In an Ottoman document from 1521, it is specified that this mobilization took at least 20 days.

The first documented mention of the large host comes from the reign of Mircea the Elder in 1408, when the Voivode granted a village to the abbot of the Snagov Monastery, who was exempt from all taxes but not from service in the large host. Vlad the Impaler tried to raise this army in the summer of 1462, during Mehmet's invasion. Due to the relatively short time, Vlad failed to form the army and only relied on his small host. From the first half of the 16th century, this army was no longer raised. The last mention of the large host comes from Vlad Înecatul, who mentioned that villagers were still required to serve in this army. After this mention, the large host never appeared in any documents or other sources.

== Early Modern Period ==
=== 16th–17th centuries ===
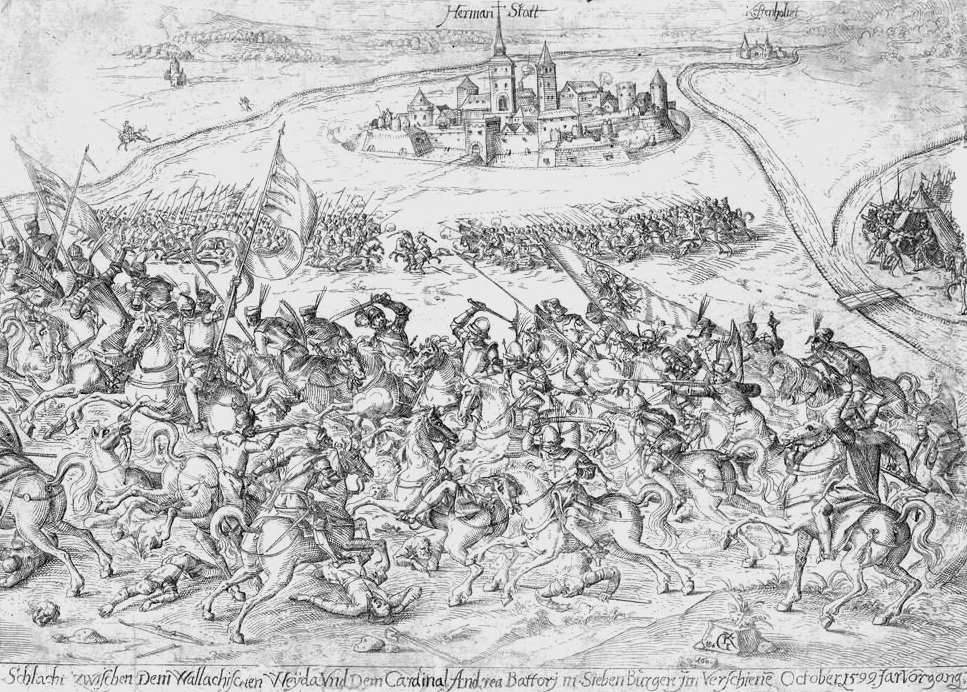
Battle of Șelimbăr in 1599, engraving by Georg Keller

During his four reigns as Voivode between 1522 and 1529, Radu of Afumați fought in 20 battles with Ottoman-supported pretenders to the throne such as Vladislav III and Mehmed Bey. He won an important victory against Mehmed Bey at Grumazi. Forced out of the country in a new campaign launched by Mehmed, Radu gained support from John Zápolya, the Voivode of Transylvania, and defeated the pretender in the autumn of 1522.

The army of Radu Paisie participated in the Ottoman expedition in Hungary under the command of Ban Șerban of Izvorani. In 1538, the Voivode himself led a 3,000-strong army in support of the invasion of Moldavia against Petru Rareș. To better equip his army with cannons for an upcoming anti-Ottoman offensive, Voivode Petru Cercel established a bronze cannon foundry in Târgoviște. The foundry, organized with the help of Venetian craftsmen, functioned until the end of his reign.

Voivode Michael the Brave carried out several successful campaigns. In 1594, he captured several Turkish forts along the Danube, defeating a Tatar army at Șerpătești, then burning Ruse in January 1595 and capturing Brăila in March. During the raids, his soldiers reached as far as Razgrad, which led to rumors that his army had reached Adrianopole. In the summer of 1595, he won at the Battle of Călugăreni, and, with new support from Transylvania, Michael secured another victory at Giurgiu. His anti-Ottoman campaigns lasted until 1599. After the peace with the Ottomans, Michael then attacked Transylvania and disposed of Andrew Báthory following the Battle of Șelimbăr. His last victory came in 1601, at the Battle of Guruslău against Sigismund Báthory.

Besides the local troops of roșii, călărași, and dorobanți, Michael's armies were composed of various mercenaries including cossacks, Székelys, Serbs, Moldavians, and Germans. Over the course of his reign their number increased, and by 1598 there were over 13,000 mercenaries.

During the time of Leon Tomșa, there were 10,000 horsemen and 2,000 footmen in the Wallachian army, as the Voivode recounted to Paul Strassburg, a secret counselor of King Gustav II Adolph. Prince Matei Basarab increased the number of soldiers in his army. The army, divided into roșii, servants (dorobanți and călărași), and mercenaries reached around 40,000 soldiers. In 1646, Matei Basarab hired additional mercenaries, the Serbian Seimeni. With this army and with his Polish allies, he defeated Vasile Lupu at the Battle of Finta.

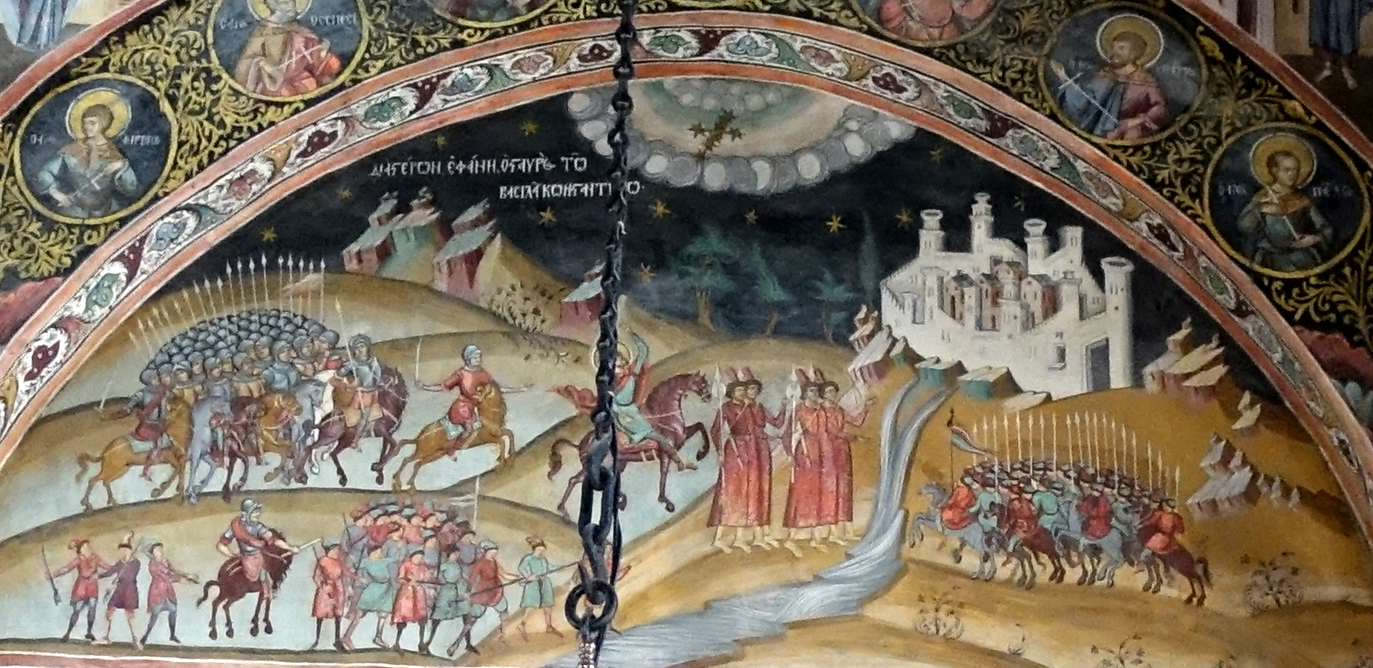
Fresco from the Horezu Monastery showing various Wallachian soldiers (Note: The fresco depicts the Battle of the Milvian Bridge, but the soldiers are shown in contemporary Wallachian equipment of the 17th century.)

As the Seimeni did not receive their pay after the battle, they began revolting against the Voivode. Initially, the revolt was stopped with the threat of invasion from George II Rákóczi. Due to the cost of maintaining the army, the new Prince, Constantin Șerban, disbanded the Seimeni in 1655. After this action, the uprising started again, this time the Seimeni being joined by the dorobanți and some roșii, and was aimed towards the boyars. The rebelling army reached a number of 20,000 soldiers and 30 cannons. They plundered churches, monasteries, and boyar estates, killing 32 boyars in the process. With help from Rákóczi, the rebel army led by Hrizea of Bogdănei was defeated in battle at Șoplea after the betrayal of some rebel commanders who joined forces with the Prince. The remnants of the Seimeni were further defeated at Târgul Bengăi. The uprising, although subsided, continued until 1657.

As an Ottoman vassal, Prince Șerban Cantacuzino was required to participate in the siege of Vienna in 1683. The 4,000-strong army raised by the Prince was given auxiliary tasks, such as building bridges, as the Ottomans did not have much faith in them. Since Cantacuzino had secretly allied himself with the Holy League, the troops under his command were ordered to sabotage the Ottoman siege works and left the battlefield soon after Sobieski's attack without taking part in the battle.

=== 18th century ===
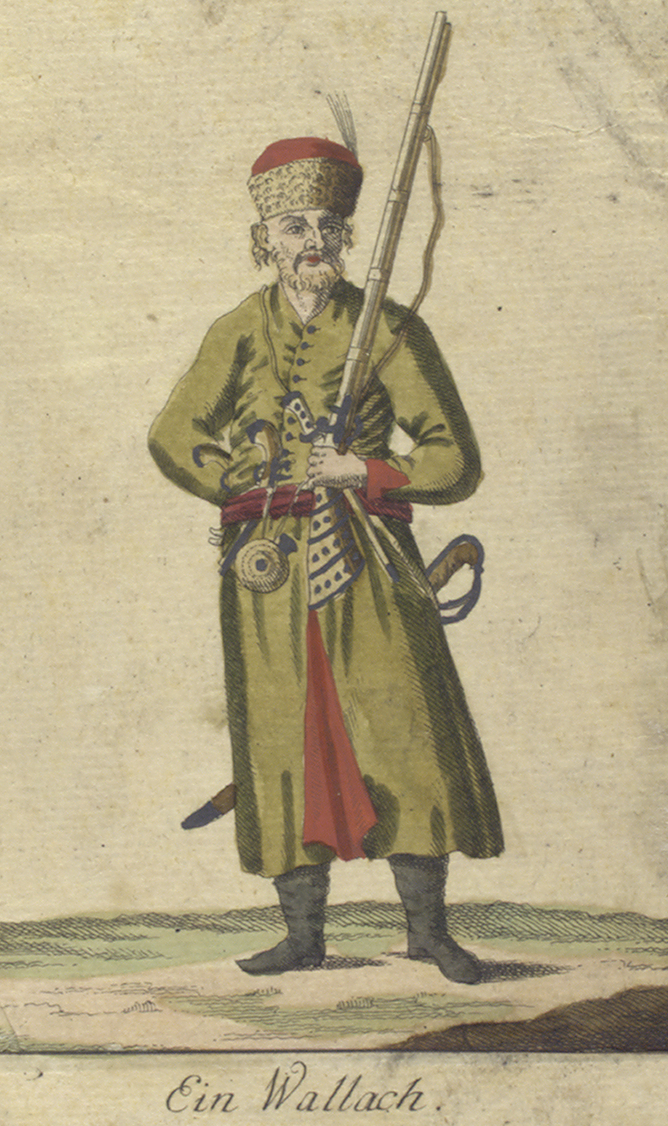
A Wallachian soldier, c. 1760

In 1711, Constantin Brâncoveanu deployed his army near the Moldavian border and waited for the Russian army. Due to the Voivode's hesitations, Spătar Toma Cantacuzino left with eight cavalry regiments to join with the Russians on 22 June. The Wallachian cavalry led by Toma took part in the siege of Brăila together with a Russian detachment led by General Carl Ewald von Rönne, an event which would lead to Brâncoveanu's arrest and execution.

After the establishment of the Phanariot rule, the armies of Wallachia and Moldavia continued their service. Like a century prior, the Wallachian army was mainly made up of mercenaries. A total number of 27 different types of troops existed throughout the century. Their equipment and uniforms varied between each troop type. Though the boyars who led them were not trained at military academies, they studied the military tactics of their time and instructed their troops accordingly. While the Phanariot armies carried out their tasks well during peacetime, such as guarding the Princely Courts, borders, and towns, and ensuring public order; during wartime, the efficiency of these armies was limited due to the poor training of the troops, lack of equipment, and the lack of a well-trained officer corps. Some victories were however achieved.

During the Austro-Turkish War of 1737–1739, an army led by Spătar Ioan Nicolae Mavrocordat, Constantin Mavrocordat's brother, together with an Ottoman detachment defeated the Austrian troops in the Argeș and Muscel counties in September 1737. On 18 October, the Austrian vanguard of 5,000 Hungarian Hussars and 300 Germans was attacked and destroyed at Pitești, forcing the main army corps to retreat towards Oltenia. The Wallachian army continued the offensive and further defeated a 10,000-strong Imperial army at Râmnicu Vâlcea in November. By December 1737, all of Austrian Oltenia was under Wallachian control. The next year, an Austrian attack was repelled at Cozia and the troops under Constantin Mavrocordat forced a Russian army to retreat to Transylvania. Other victories were registered against the Austrians along the Wallachian border by the army of Nicolae Mavrogheni in the Russo-Turkish War (1787–1792) before the allied victory at the Battle of Focșani.

The Wallachian soldiers mainly wore green and blue colored uniforms, with red being reserved for nobles, though eventually red was adopted by officers and certain troops as well. Yellow uniforms were sometimes worn by officers, while white ones were worn by the Princely Court guards. Other troops might have worn uniforms in multiple colors. Some irregular troops like the potecași wore peasant clothes.

== Modern Wallachian Army ==
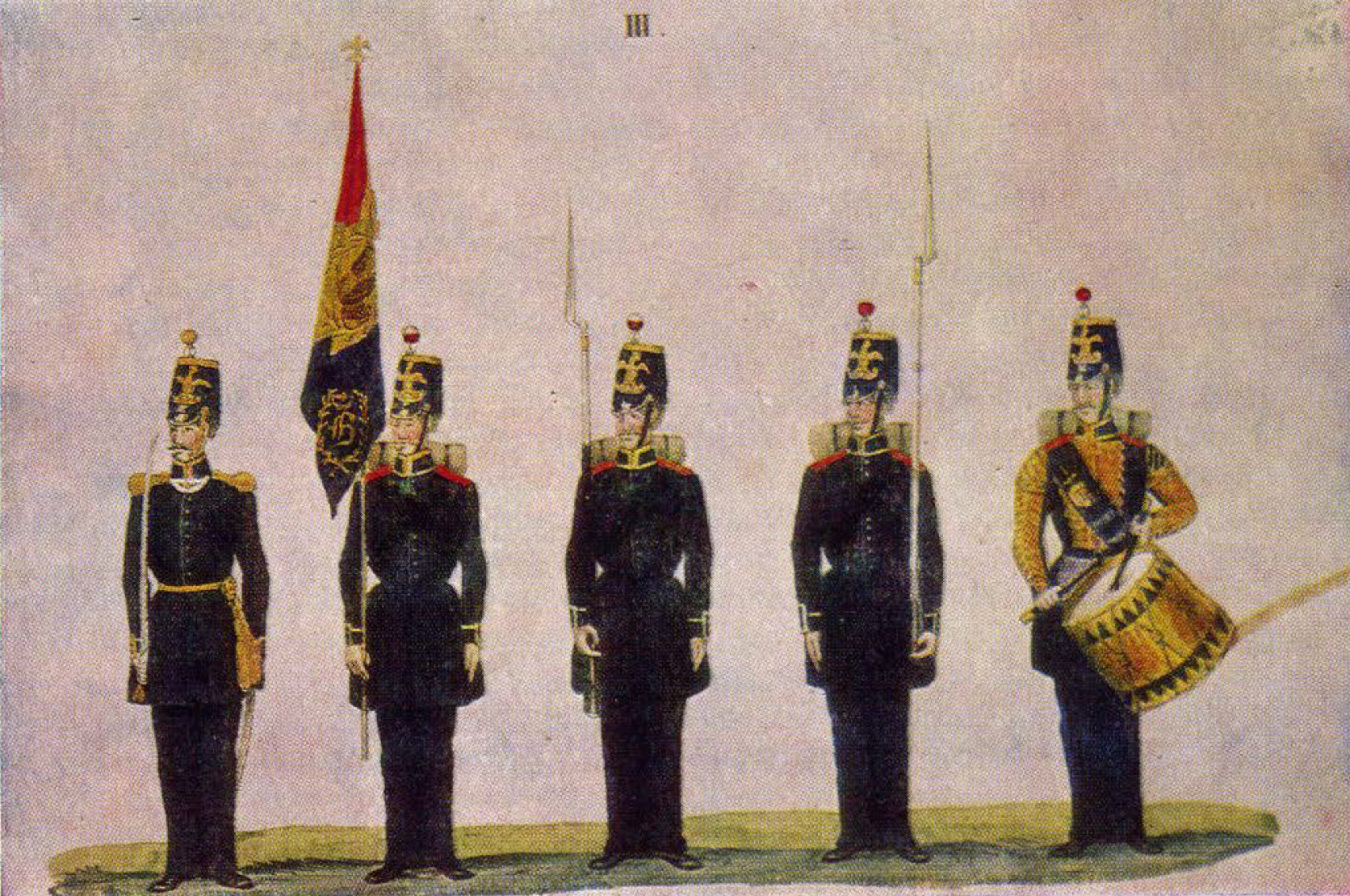
Wallachian model 1843 infantry uniforms

During the Russian occupation of the Danubian Principalities from 1829 to 1834, the Wallachian army was modernized. Under the supervision of Russian General Pavel Kiselyov, a Wallachian standing army was created. In April 1830, a committee composed of General Starov, Lieutenant Alexandru Ghica, Colonel Ment, and Lieutenant-colonel Ion Odobescu was formed.

According to the law issued by the drafting commission of the Organic Regulation on 30 April 1830, the Wallachian army was to be organized into 6 infantry battalions and 6 cavalry squadrons. The core of this army were the Pandurs, which formed six battalions. Around June 1830, it was announced that the new army would have 6 cavalry squadrons, and 3 regiments (the 1st, 2nd and 3rd line infantry regiments), each with 2 infantry battalions. The previous Wallachian units were disbanded and the soldiers were instead transferred to the Dorobanți units, which would ensure the internal guard of the country. In total, the regular Wallachian army numbered 3,516 infantrymen and 1,200 cavalrymen, while the irregular troops numbered 4,488 soldiers, both mounted and on foot.

The commander of the "militia" (army) was Spătar Alexandru Ghica, while the officer corps was made up of boyars and sons of boyars. The regimental commanders, appointed in July 1830, were Colonel Emanuel Băleanu and Major I. Solomon. Alexandru Ghica's brother, Costache, became the inspector of the cavalry. The reception of certain Pandur chiefs, like Christian Tell, as officers in the army caused some displeasure among the boyars.

Wallachian 4-pounder cannon, 1852 lithograph (Note: The hand-colored lithograph made by Andreas Bielz and Karl Danielis shows the Wallachian artillerymen wearing the recently acquired pickelhaube)

In 1843, with the occasion of a visit to Constantinople and advised by Lieutenant Ioan Emanoil Florescu, Prince Gheorghe Bibescu requested and received four cannons for equipping the Wallachian army. The 4-pounder cannons, similar to the Gribeauval system, entered service with the first modern artillery battery of Wallachia on 10 November 1843. Another eight artillery pieces (six 12-pounder cannons, and two 7-pounder howitzers) were received in 1849, and by 1850 these were organized into a foot artillery battery and a horse artillery battery of six guns each. The two batteries participated in the battles against the Ottomans during the Crimean War, such as the Siege of Silistria, being confiscated by the Russians to avoid capture after their retreat from the Principality. The artillery was returned after the unification with Moldavia.

=== 1848 and the battle of Dealul Spirii ===
During the 1848 revolution, as the Ottoman army led by Omar Pasha and Fuat Pasha crossed into Wallachia, an armed resistance began to be organized. Military units of the army were rallied at the Râureni camp by Gheorghe Magheru. Due to the poor economic conditions which did not allow the resistance to properly arm itself, and due to the hesitation of some revolution leaders, these troops never entered combat with the Ottomans.

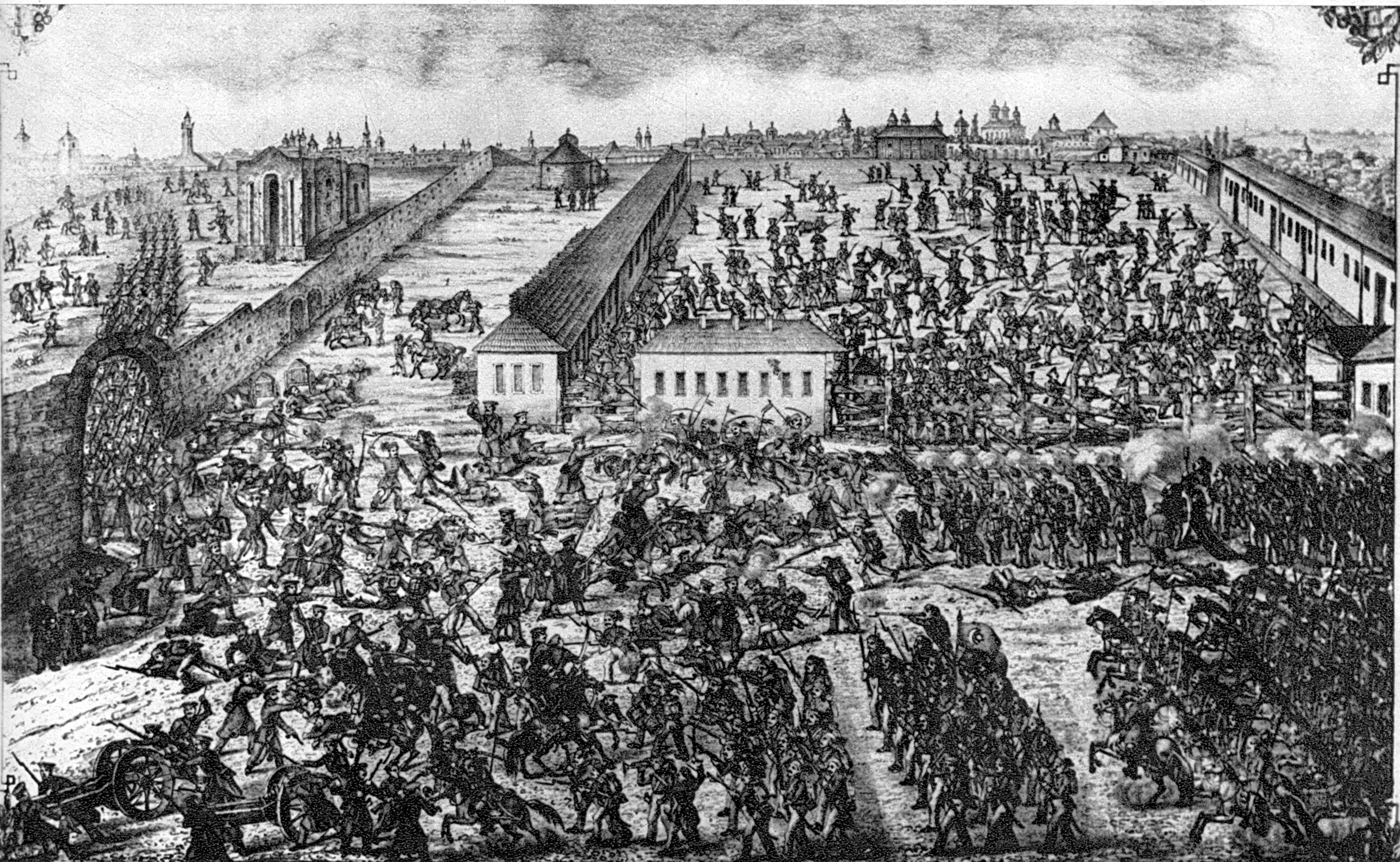
The battle of Dealul Spirii

On 24 September, the Ottomans set up their camp at Cotroceni, being faced by several thousand peasants who tried to defend Bucharest. After arresting the revolution leaders, the Ottoman army began marching towards the city on 25 September, dividing their forces into three columns. The first column, led by Mehmed Pasha, passed through Văcărești. The larger second column, led by Fuat and Omar Pasha, forced their entry through the barrier at Beilic Bridge (Calea Șerban Vodă). The peasants tried to stop the advance of the Ottoman column, but due to the lack of weapons they were defeated by the Turkish cavalry, with hundreds of peasants being killed in the fight.

The third Ottoman column, led by Kerim Pasha advanced along Calea Pandurilor, heading to the barracks on Dealul Spirii. Despite being ordered not to do so, Captain Pavel Zăgănescu prepared the fire company for armed resistance. At the same time, Colonel Radu Golescu with the 2nd Infantry Regiment and the 7th Company of the 1st Infantry Regiment, refused to hand over the barracks to the Ottomans. In the ensuing battle, the Wallachian soldiers managed to hold their lines. To try and break them, the Ottomans used their cannons, causing casualties among the defenders. The firemen rushed the two pieces of artillery and managed to turn them on the Ottomans. Due to the intervention of an Ottoman cavalry squadron, however, the Wallachians were pushed back. Seeing the determined defense of their opponents, the Ottomans went on to negotiate with them. In exchange for laying down their weapons, they were to be guaranteed safe exit from the barracks; however, once a group of unarmed soldiers left the barracks, the Turks opened fire. Eventually, the barracks were captured, and the rest of the city was pacified as well.

=== Crimean War ===
In June 1853, Russian troops crossed into the two Danubian Principalities and occupied them without declaring war on the Ottoman Empire. The Russian administration decided to incorporate the Wallachian and Moldavian troops into the Imperial Russian Army. At the same time, volunteer detachments were formed to fight against the Ottomans. Due to the entry of the United Kingdom and France into the war on the side of the Ottomans, the Russians were forced to retreat from the Principalities.

Following the Boiagi-Kioi agreement from 14 July 1854, the Principalities were to come under a joint Austrian-Ottoman occupation. An Ottoman and an Austrian brigade were to be stationed in Bucharest, and General Johann Baptist Coronini-Cronberg was named commander of the occupation troops. The occupation lasted until 1857.

== Equipment and tactics ==
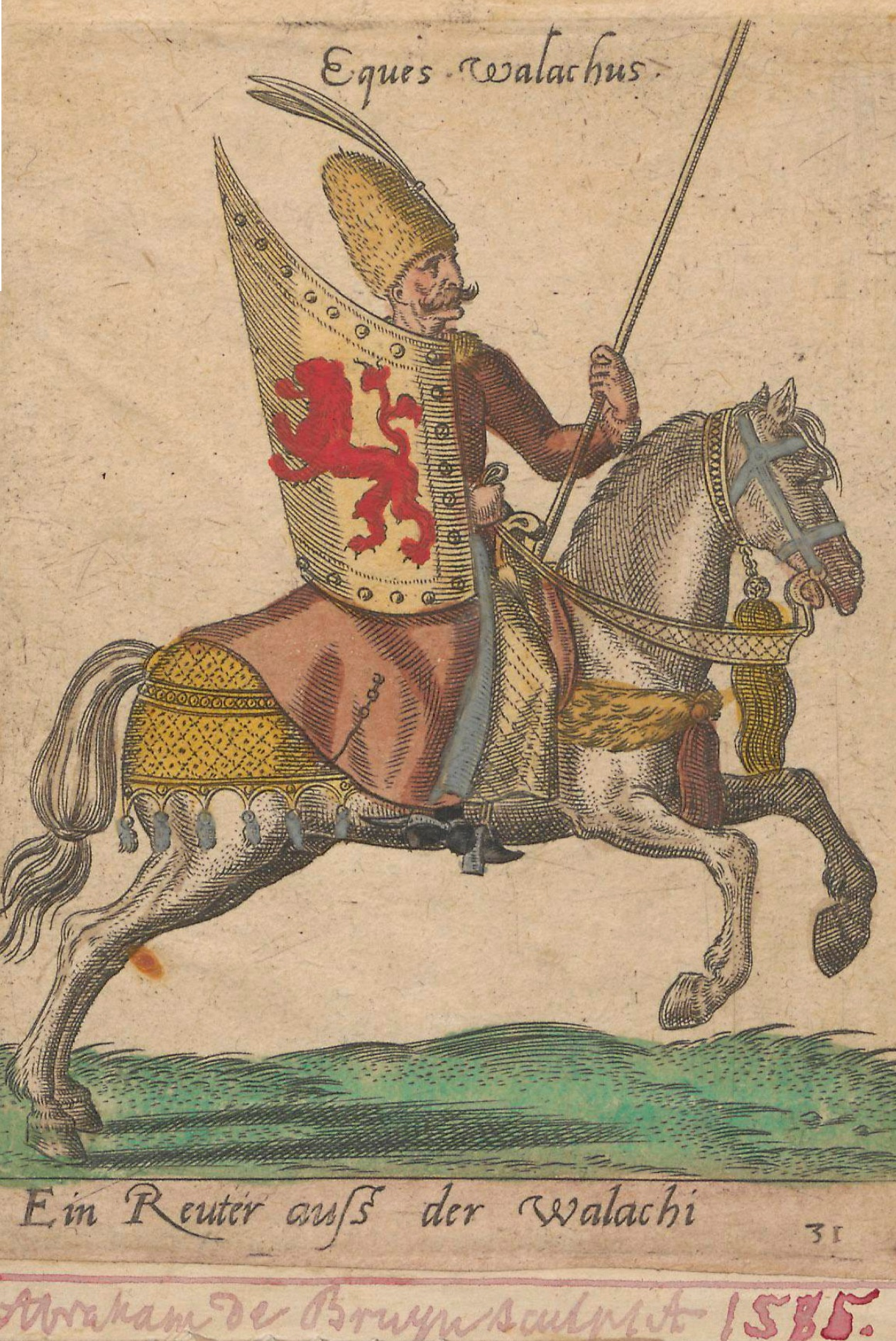
Wallachian cavalryman of the late 16th century

The strategies used by Wallachia, as in Moldavia, were mostly defensive in nature. In order to disrupt an enemy's advance in the country, the population was often required to retreat to the wooded or mountainous regions, while the army engaged in hit-and-run tactics and avoided direct confrontations. This was done to delay the advance of an army and to try and lure the enemy into more defensible places like marshes, wooded areas, or mountain passes.

Like Moldavia, Wallachia predominantly used light cavalry, therefore they were lightly equipped with their defensive equipment mainly consisting of a shield of different shapes (round, triangular, or winged). Gambesons and mail armour were also used. The viteji and the boyars could be equipped with heavier equipment, including brigandines and plate armour. For example, according to the Italian chronicle "Cronaca Carrarese", Radu I of Wallachia acquired some 10,000 suits of armour from the Republic of Venice around the year 1377. In a document issued by John Zápolya to the Saxons of Brașov regarding a ban imposed by the King on the arms trade with Wallachia in 1522, it is detailed that the Saxons were bringing many weapons and armour to Transylvania from Hungary, and then selling them to Wallachia.

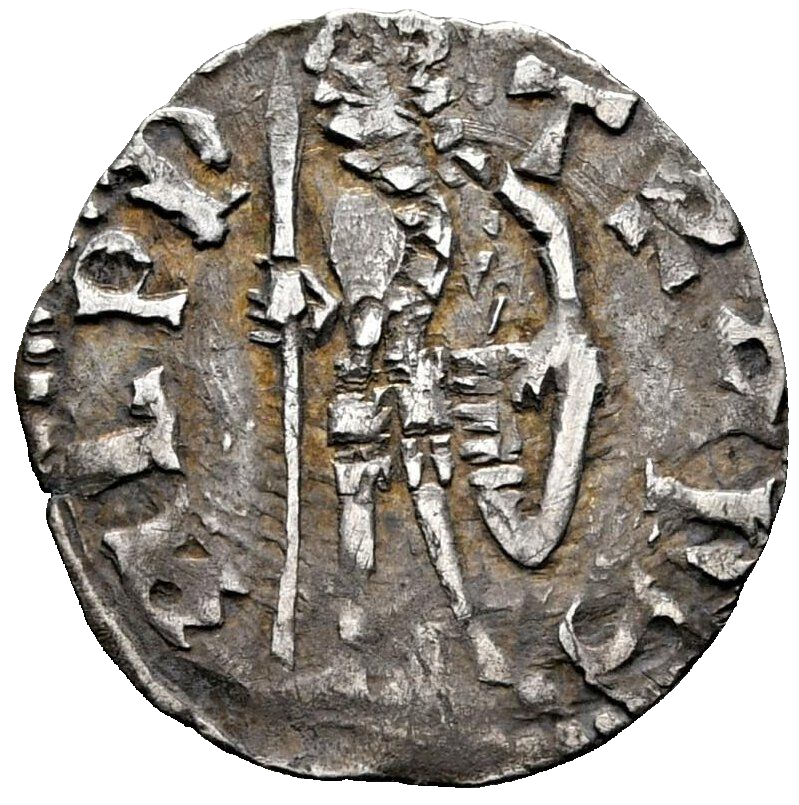
Coin portraying Radu I in armour

The equipment and weapons of the Wallachian soldiers during the Middle Ages were Western-like with melee weapons like lances, swords, and maces. Later, with the influence of the Ottoman Empire, eastern-style sabers were adopted. Ranged weapons used were bows and crossbows. The bows were made of hazel, hornbeam, ash or elm wood and their string was made of flax, hemp, or bowels. According to historian Radu Rosetti, the Wallachian archers could shoot about 10-12 arrows per minute, up to a distance of 220 m (720 ft). The use of guns in Wallachia was first mentioned in the mid-15th century when Vlad Dracul used two bombards during the siege of Giurgiu in 1445 as part of the Burgundian crusade led by Walerand de Wavrin. A prior mention from 1432 of the purchase of firearms from Brașov also exists, while archaeological evidence suggests that the first guns of Wallachia date to the rule of Mircea the Elder. The use of wagon forts by Wallachia was first noted during the battle of the Vodna stream in November 1473, when Radu the Handsome used one against the army of Stephen the Great of Moldavia. After the battle, the Moldavians captured this fort.

By the 17th century, almost all the infantry was armed with arquebuses while the cavalry also made use of pistols carried in saddle holsters. The gunpowder, as well as some of the firearms were provided by the state. The ammunition, however, often had to be acquired by the individual soldier due to varying calibers. The use of spears and bows continued throughout the century and into the early 1700s. Throughout the 18th century, the troops were armed with yatagans or sabers besides muskets.

After its establishment, the standing army of Wallachia was to be equipped in a similar way to the Russian military, with muzzleloading flintlock muskets and bayonets for the infantry; pistols, sabers, and lances for the cavalry; fascine knives (tesace) for the sub-officers and drummers. The initial armament consisted of old Austrian and Russian firearms. Due to the poor condition of these weapons, new guns were acquired from Saint Petersburg in 1833, after a previously agreed intervention of General Kiselyov. More muskets and sabers were purchased from Russia in 1844. After the revolution of 1848 and the end of the occupation, the army started to be reequipped.

The transition to percussion cap firearms began in 1851 with an order for 3,000 "standard French model" rifles placed in Liège. Carbines were also purchased for the cavalry. After the Crimean War and the confiscation of firearms by the retreating Russian forces, new rifles and bayonets were bought from Liège by order of Prince Barbu Știrbei in 1856. At the same time, 600 Früwirth model carbines were acquired from Vienna to equip the newly formed tirailleur units. The cavalry also received new Austrian rifles and pistols.

== Organization ==
From the Middle Ages through the early modern period, the soldiers (voinici) of the Wallachian army were organized in three types of military units:

- The steag ("banner"), consisting of between 50 and 100 men, roughly equivalent to a company;
- The ceată ("cohort"), made up of at least four steaguri, roughly equivalent to a battalion;
- The pâlc ("group"), consisting of several cete, roughly equivalent to a regiment.

From the late 16th century, the army began a reorganization process with the formation of the slujitori (lit. 'servants'). During the 17th century, the army relied heavily on the slujitori. These soldiers were recruited from the free peasants and the townsfolk and organized into military-fiscal guilds (bresle militare) grouped by village or town. For their duty, they received payment, exemption from certain taxes, and the right to work the land belonging to the Prince. The main categories (guilds) of slujitori were the Dorobanți and the Călărași.

Transitioning from the old system based on small armies of land owners, in the 17th century, the army was divided into three categories: the roșii (curteni), the slujitori, and the mercenaries (called lefegii). The guilds or cete were placed under the command of some court officials (dregători): the cavalry was commanded by the Spătar, who was also considered the commander of the army (căpetenia oștirii), while the infantry was led by the Aga. The soldiers were organized in steaguri and were further grouped into units led by captains (căpitani). Subordinated to these captains were the iuzbași or sutași (equivalent to lieutenants), the ceauși (equivalent to sergeants or corporals), and the stegari (standard-bearers).

== Units ==
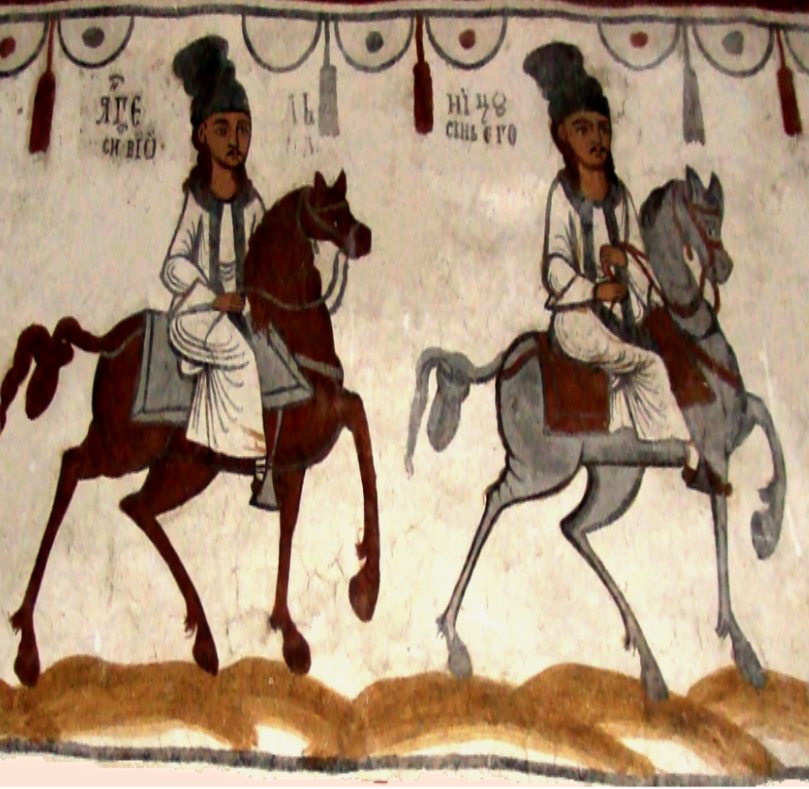
Oltenian potecași, c. 1805

The Wallachian Army used various units between the 14th and the 19th centuries:

- Arnăuți - initially Albanian mercenaries. By the end of the 18th century the Aranut troops included other ethnicities as well.
- Călărași - irregular cavalry recruited from the country.
- Ciohodari - servants of the Princely Court, acted as the personal bodyguards of the Voivode in the 18th century.
- Dorobanți - infantry and cavalry soldiers, the term is derived either from the German "Trabant" or Hungarian "Darabant".
- Fuștași - soldiers armed with the "fuște", a type of spear. They were assigned as personal guards of the Voivode.
- Mocani - Wallachian border guard corps formed in the first half of the 18th century and tasked with defending the border with Moldavia.
- Satârași - a guard corps armed with large axes called "satâre" which were also used for executions.
- Seimeni - Serb mercenaries first recruited by Matei Basarab.
- Panduri - irregular troops, appeared in Imperial Oltenia in the 18th century and acted as a police force.
- Panțâri - a type of cuirassiers, appeared in the 16th century. The term is derived from the German "panzer" meaning "armour".
- Plăieși - border guard troops from mountainous areas.
- Potecași - border guard cavalry troops that defended mountain passes.
- Poterași - irregular light cavalry, used as police troops.
- Roșii - also referred to as cervenii, a type of cavalry which appeared in the late 16th century. Formed during the reign of Mihnea II from the previous curteni, they were exempt from certain taxes. They wore red colored uniforms.
- Tălpași - infantry corps formed by Șerban Cantacuzino from the corps of the Dorobanți.
- Trabanți - appeared during the reign of Vlad the Impaler, they were mercenaries recruited from Transylvania and acted as a personal guard of the Voivode.
- Ulani - light cavalry armed with lances.
- Vânători - during peacetime they worked as hunters and defended the border regions, during wars they were called to the army. They were exempt from certain taxes.
- Viteji - synonymous with "curteni" (lit. 'courtiers') in Wallachia according to Nicolae Stoicescu, small land-owners with permanent military duties. They were the equivalent of the court knights from the Kingdom of Hungary (milites aulae).

== Fleet ==
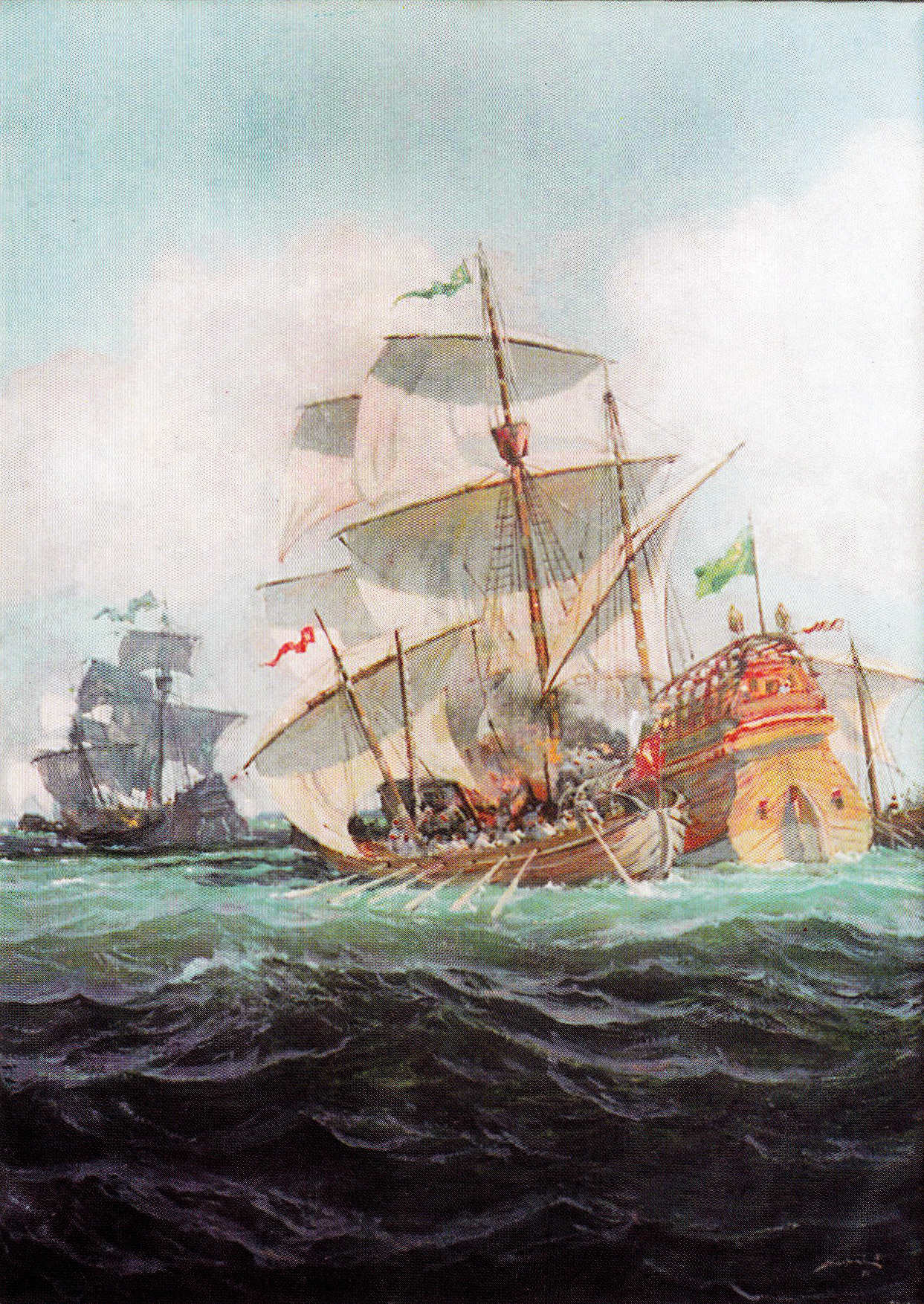
The șăici of Michael the Brave at the Battle of Giurgiu, oil painting by Dimitrie Știubei

The first mention of Wallachia's use of ships for military operations comes from Jean de Wavrin, who wrote about the 1445 Burgundian expedition in Wallachia. During this expedition led by Walerand de Wavrin, the Wallachian Voivode Vlad Dracul offered to guide the Burgundian fleet on the Danube. A number of 40 or 50 monoxyles with 500 soldiers were sent to aid the eight crusader galleys. These kinds of boats might have also been used by Vlad the Impaler during his 1462 campaign south of the Danube.

During the reign of Michael the Brave, the voivode constructed șăici of various sizes to arm his fleet. These were used to harass Ottoman commercial ships on the river. According to Turkish chronicler Mustafa Selaniki, in 1596 the Wallachians used some 200 șăici to transport an army of over 2,000 soldiers and attack Ottoman positions in the Babadag region. In 1598, these ships were also used to attack Vidin, transporting soldiers, horses, artillery, and ammunition. The șaica, along with other boats, was further used in the attack against Nicopolis.

Voivode Constantin Brâncoveanu also encouraged naval construction, at the same time establishing a river fleet in 1697. During his reign, the so-called Brâncovean caïques were built at the Giurgiu shipyard. These caïques were similar to galleys, being crewed by 28 oarsmen, one or two gunners, a helmsman, and a commander, and could transport up to 100 soldiers.

In 1793, Alexander Mourouzis obtained the approval of The Porte to build a small flotilla of "bolozane, șăici, caïques, and other vessels, to carry out the emperor's orders". For this, he issued the "Hrisov for the country's ships, which are to sail on the waters of the Danube" (Hrisov pentru corăbiile țărei, ce sunt a umbla pe apa Dunărei). In 1794, 5 large sailing ships and 16 smaller vessels were built, followed by two gunboats a year later.

With the establishment of the regular armies of Wallachia and Moldavia, each state created a flotilla of 26 row boats. The Wallachian boats were constructed in Giurgiu. These were crewed by army soldiers and tasked with patrolling the port areas. Between 1844 and 1845, the river police corps was equipped with three gunboats built in Austria and another 42 boats. Of the three, one was armed with two 3-pounder guns and two 1-pounder guns, and the other two were armed with one 3-pounder. The gunboats patrolled the ports of Brăila, Giurgiu, and Calafat. In 1851, another gunboat was purchased.

== See also ==
- Moldavian military forces

== Bibliography ==
- Bárány, Attila (2012). "The Expansion of the Kingdom of Hungary in the Middle Ages (1000–1490)". In Berend, Nóra (ed.). The Expansion of Central Europe in the Middle Ages. Ashgate Variorum. ISBN 9781409422457.
- Bâgiu, Lucian Vasile (2013). The Image of the Romanians in the Travelling Impressions of 17th Century Scandinavians (PDF). Editura Alfa. ISBN 9786065401297.
- Berza, Mihai; Cihodaru, Constantin; Mioc, Damaschin; Pall, Francisc (1977). Documenta Romaniae Historica. D. Vol. I | Relații între Țările Române. București: Editura Academei Române. OCLC 8425344.
- Boriga, Gabriel Florin; Moțoc, Honorius; Stan, Mihai; Coandă, George; Petrescu, Victor; Boriga, Niculae Alexandru (2012). Enciclopedia orașului Târgoviște (PDF). Târgoviște: Bibliotheca. ISBN 9789737126795. Archived from the original (PDF) on 5 April 2023.
- Cazacu, Matei (2017). Dracula. East Central and Eastern Europe in the Middle Ages, 450-1450. Vol. 46. Brill. ISBN 9789004347250.
- Ciachir, Nicolae (1965). "Unele aspecte privind orașul București în timpul Războiului Crimeii (1853-1856)". București - Materiale de Istorie și Muzeografie (in Romanian). Bucharest: Muzeul de Istorie a orașului București.
- Cîmpeanu, Liviu (2018). "Considerații asupra artileriei lui Ștefan cel Mare". Analele Putnei (in Romanian) (XIV). Centrul de cercetare și documentare Ștefan cel Mare.
- Cîmpeanu, Liviu (2022). Cruciada împotriva lui Ștefan cel Mare: Codrii Cosminului 1497 (in Romanian). Bucharest: Editura Humanitas. ISBN 9789735077198.
- d'Ohsson, Constantin Mouradgea (2006). Histoire des Mongols depuis Tchinguiz-Khan jusqu'à Timour Bey ou Tamerlan (in French). Vol. II. Elibron Classics. ISBN 0543942430.
- Denize, Eugen (2002). Italia și italienii în cultura română (in Romanian). Editura Mica Valahie. ISBN 9738511771.
- Georgescu, Vlad (1991). The Romanians: A History. Ohio State University Press. ISBN 0814205119.
- Gheonea, Valentin (September 1996). "Un domnitor controversat — Radu Paisie". Magazin Istoric (in Romanian).
- Gheorghe, Adrian; Weber, Albert; Bohn, Thomas M.; Paulus, Cristof; Anca, Alexandru Ștefan (2019). Corpus Draculianum (in Romanian). Vol. 1: Scrisori și documente de cancelarie : cancelarii valahe. Brăila: Editura Academiei Române - Editura Istros a Muzeului Brăilei. ISBN 9786066543842.
- Giurescu, Constantin C. (1938). Istoria Românilor. Vol. I. Bucharest: Fundația pentru Literatură și Artă "Regele Carol II".
- Hurmuzachi, Eudoxiu; Iorga, Nicolae (1911). Documente privitore la istoria românilor (in Romanian). Vol. 15: Acte și scrisori din arhivele orașelor ardelene 1358-1600. Bucharest: Atelierele Grafice Socec & Comp.
- Ilie, Aurora-Florentina (2015). "Drapelul Regimentului 19 Infanterie, model 1922" (PDF). Anuarul Muzeului Național al Literaturii Române Iași (in Romanian). Iași: Editura Muzeelor Literare.
- Iorga, Nicolae (1935). Istoria lui Mihai Viteazul (PDF) (in Romanian). Vol. 1.
- Jambor, Petre (1979). "Nobilii de Dăbâca și relațiile cu Țara Românească în veacul al XIV-lea". Acta Musei Napocensis (in Romanian). XVI. Cluj-Napoca: Muzeul de Istorie al Transilvaniei.
- Ioniță, Adrian; Kelemen, Beatrice; Simon, Alexandru (2017). AL WA: Prințul Negru al Vlahiei și vremurile sale [AL WA: The Black Prince of Wallachia and his times] (in Romanian). Cluj-Napoca: Academia Română - Centrul de Studii Transilvane, Editura Argonaut. ISBN 9786068694719 – via Academia.edu.
- Jefferson, John (2012). The Holy Wars of King Wladislas and Sultan Murad. History of Warfare. Vol. 76. Brill. ISBN 9789004229259.
- Kristó, Gyula (1988). Az Anjou-kor háborúi [Wars in the Age of the Angevins] (in Hungarian). Zrínyi Kiadó. ISBN 9633269059.
- Lukács, Antál (1991). "O campanie angevină necunoscută din 1382". Anuarul Institutului de Istorie A.D. Xenopol (in Romanian). XXVIII. Iași: Editura Academei Române.
- Medin, Antonio; Tolomei, Guido (1900). Cronaca Carrarese. Rerum italicarum scriptores (in Italian). Vol. 17. Città di Castello: S. Lapi. OCLC 1050258472.
- Mugnai, Bruno; Flaherty, Chris (2015). Der lange Türkenkrieg : 1593 - 1606. Soldiers & weapons. Vol. II. Soldiershop Publishing. OCLC 1159296854.
- Neagoe, Claudiu (2019). "Military organization of Wallachia from the first Basarabs until the beginning of the 16th century". Annales d'Université "Valahia" Târgoviște. 21. ISSN 1584-1855 – via Persee.fr.
- Panaitescu, Petre P. (2002). Mihai Viteazul (PDF) (in Romanian). Corint. ISBN 9736531732.
- Pogăciaș, Andrei (2011). "Războiul ruso-austro-turc din 1736-39". Identitate și alteritate: Studii de istorie politică și cultură (in Romanian). Vol. 5. Cluj-Napoca: Presa Universitară Clujeană. ISBN 9789735953263 – via Academia.edu.
- Pogăciaș, Andrei (March 2016). "Armatele uitate. Trupele Țărilor Române în lungul secol fanariot". Historia Special (in Romanian). No. 14/2016. ISSN 2286-0258.
- Pogăciaș, Andrei (May 2020). "Campaniile militare ale lui Vlad Țepeș". Historia (in Romanian). No. 220/2020. ISSN 1582-7968.
- Pogăciaș, Andrei (June 2021). "Nicolae Mavrogheni, de la dragoman la damnation memorie". Historia (in Romanian). No. 233/2021. ISSN 1582-7968.
- Rezachevici, Constantin (2003). "VI. Instituțiile statului | I. Instituțiile centrale și locale în Țara Românească și Moldova". In Academia Română - Secția de științe istorice și arheologie (ed.). Istoria Românilor (in Romanian). Vol. V. O epocă de înnoiri în spirit european (1601-1711/1716). Bucharest: Editura Enciclopedică. ISBN 9734503812.
- Rezachevici, Constantin (2004). "Caracterul bătăliei din 1330 între Basarab și Carol Robert: Țărani neînarmați sau cavaleri de tip apusean?". Argesis – Studii și Comunicări [The character of the 1330 battle between Basarab and Carol Robert: Unarmed peasants or Western-style knights?]. Pitești: Muzeul Județean Argeș.
- Scafeș, Cornel I. (2012). "Înzestrarea oștirilor române în vremea Regulamentului Organic (1830-1856)" (PDF). Buletinul Arhivelor Militare Române (in Romanian). No. 57/2012. ISSN 1454-0924.
- Stoica, Vasile (1919). The Roumanian Question: The Roumanians and their Lands. Pittsburgh: Pittsburgh Printing Company.
- Stoicescu, Nicolae (1968). Curteni și slujitori. Contribuții la istoria armatei române (in Romanian). Bucharest: Editura Militară. OCLC 641604285.
- Stoicescu, Nicolae (1983). Radu de la Afumați (in Romanian). Bucharest: Editura Militară.
- Stroea, Adrian (2008). 165 ani de existență a artileriei române moderne (PDF) (in Romanian). Bucharest: Editura Centrului Tehnic-Editorial al Armatei. Archived from the original (PDF) on 26 August 2011.
- Stroea, Adrian; Băjenaru, Gheorghe (2010). Artileria Română în date și imagini (PDF) (in Romanian). Bucharest: Editura Centrului Tehnic-Editorial al Armatei. ISBN 9786065240803. Archived from the original (PDF) on 27 March 2023.
- Vásáry, István (2005). Cumans and Tatars: Oriental Military in the Pre-Ottoman Balkans, 1185–1365. Cambridge University Press. ISBN 0521837561.
- Veszprémy, László (2008). "Páncél és páncélosok említései a krónikákban és oklevelekben" [Armours and armoured men in the chronicles and charters]. Lovagvilág Magyarországon (PDF) (in Hungarian). Budapest: Argumentum. ISBN 9789634464679.
- Whelan, Mark (January 2016). "Pasquale de Sorgo and the Second Battle of Kosovo (1448): A Translation". The Slavonic and East European Review. 94. Modern Humanities Research Association.
