= Luminița =

Luminiţa may refer to:

- Luminița (name)
- Port of Luminița in Romania
- Luminița River in Romania
- Luminiţa, a village in Corbu Commune, Constanţa County, Romania
- Luminiţa, a village in Topolog Commune, Tulcea County, Romania
- Luminiţa, a village in Valea-Trestieni Commune, Nisporeni district, Moldova
