= Dorobanți (military unit) =

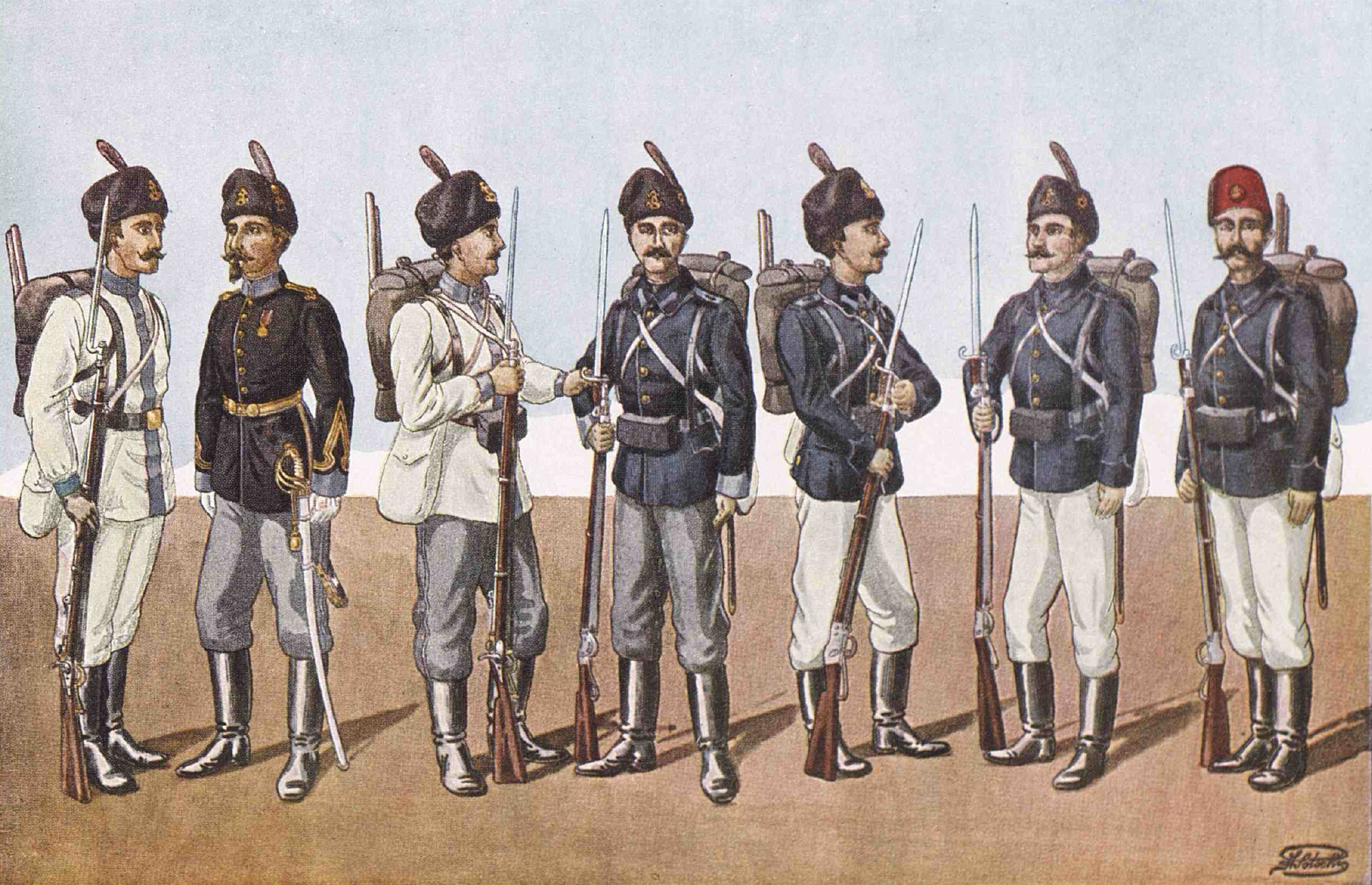
- Uniforms of the Dorobanți between 1877 and 1884, with the uniform of the muslim Dorobanți of Dobrogea.
- Active: 16th century–1891
- Countries: Wallachia; Moldavia; Kingdom of Romania
- Type: Infantry; Cavalry
- Size: 33 regiments

The Dorobanți (Romanian pronunciation: [doroˈbantsʲ]; also referred to as Dărăbani) were a type of soldiers originating in the armies of Wallachia and Moldavia from the 16th century. They acted as both cavalry and infantry, and later also worked as a police force. From the late 19th century, the Dorobanți only acted as infantry, with the mounted Dorobanți being reorganized into Călărași units.

In 1891, the Dorobanți regiments were merged with the Line infantry regiments to form the new infantry units.

== History ==
=== Origins ===
The term "dorobanț" comes from the German "Trabant" or from the Hungarian "Darabant". The Dorobanți first appeared in the 16th century in the armies of Michael the Brave, being both infantry and cavalry soldiers equipped with firearms.

In the 17th century, during Matei Basarab's reign, the Dorobanți formed a corps and were part of the category of princely servants together with the Călărași. They were deployed in the city garrisons of Târgoviște, Bucharest, Ploiești, and Buzău. After the disbanding of the Seimeni in 1655, the Dorobanți joined the Serb mercenaries in their revolt, being defeated in battle by George II Rákóczi. The Dorobanți continued to exist throughout the 17th century. Prince Șerban Cantacuzino also created the Tălpași infantry corps from the Dorobanți corps.

=== Regulamentul Organic ===
According to the Organic Regulation, it was stipulated that all the troops from before the regulations were to be disbanded and replaced with the Dorobanți. The Dorobanți, together with the "militia" (army) were to maintain the internal peace and order of the country, except for the borders. In Bucharest, they were assigned to the Agie (the police prefecture). Of the total number of soldiers, 2/3 were to be mounted and the rest on foot.

According to a special law issued in 1832, the Dorobanți were divided into 18 cete (battalions), matching the number of counties Wallachia had at that time. Each battalion had several căprării (sections), composed of 10 men and led by a căprar (corporal). The battalions were commanded by a tist (officer), chosen from the boyar families. The Dorobanți of Bucharest were subordinated to the Agie and were later called "police Dorobanți". These Dorobanți were authorized to carry weapons in the city and were tasked to ensure the night watch by setting up "streji" which had precisely defined patrol areas. They also had to guard the 10 entry points of the city ("barriers").

During the Revolution of 1848, the Dorobanți were disbanded in Wallachia for a short time, being replaced with the national guard (gvadria națională). In 1850, they were reorganized by Prince Barbu Știrbei, at the same time receiving a simpler uniform.

== After the union of Wallachia and Moldavia ==
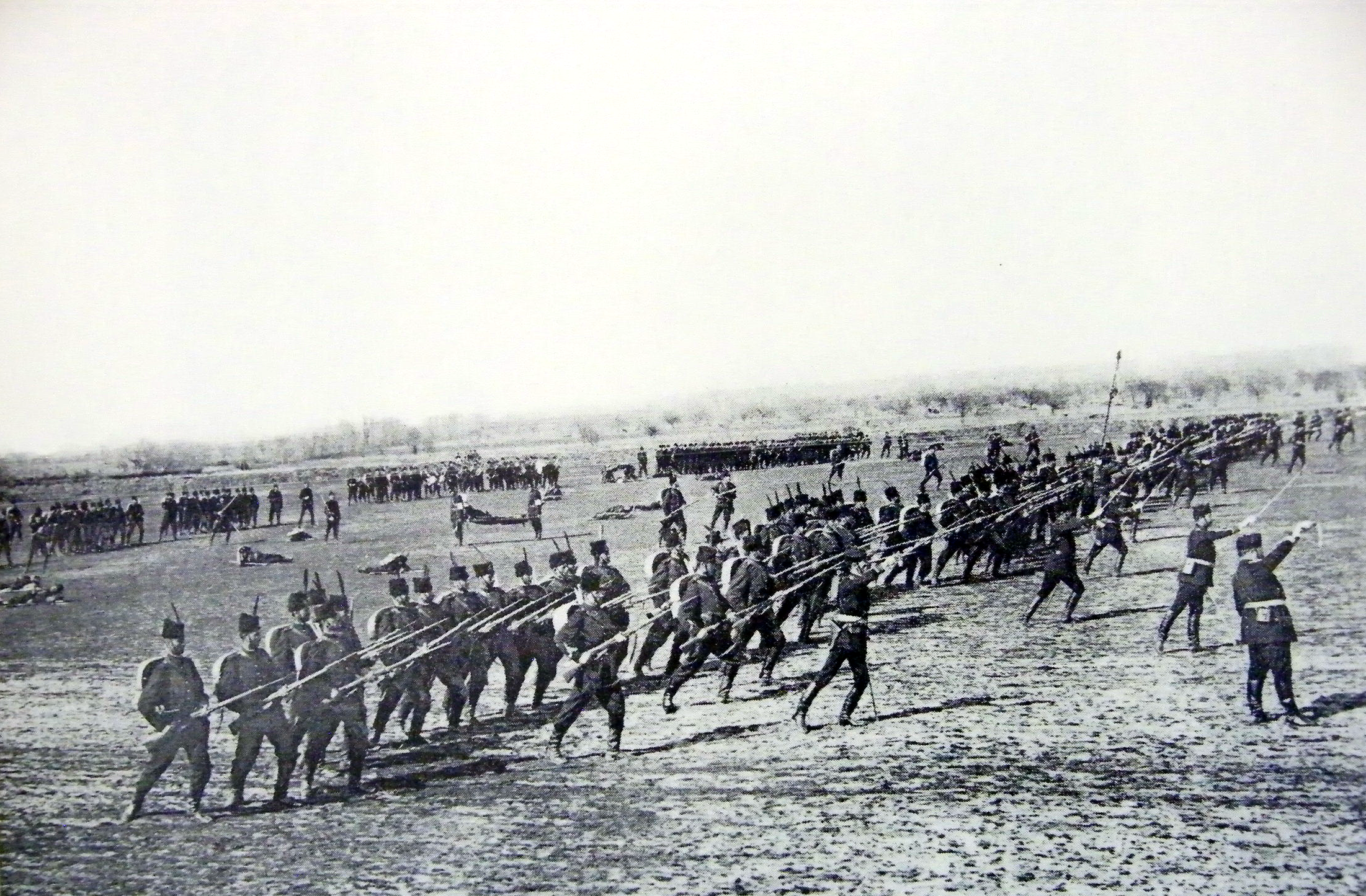
20th Infantry Regiment "Teleorman" in 1902

With the unification of Moldavia and Wallachia, the Dorobanți units were extended to Moldavia, being unified in three inspectorates throughout the country in Craiova, Bucharest, and Iași, reaching 32 squadrons in 1864. The inspectorates were disbanded in 1868, followed by the mounted Dorobanți in 1871. The former mounted Dorobanți, nicknamed the "black hussars", were reorganized into Călărași units, with the Dorobanți remaining only infantry units.

In 1872, eight Dorobanți regiments were formed as part of the territorial army. Another eight regiments were formed in 1876. These regiments were also tasked with guarding the borders. The Dorobanți participated in the Romanian War of Independence in various battles, such as the Siege of Plevna.

In 1891, the Dorobanți were merged with the Line infantry regiments, though they still often appeared as Dorobanți regiments, as well as with the name of Infantry regiments in registers and documents. Before the merge with the line infantry regiments there were 33 Dorobanți regiments. The last one, the 33rd Dorobanți Regiment "Tulcea", was formed in 1889.

== Uniforms ==
With the money they received, the Dorobanți had to either buy or make their uniforms, which had to feature the marking of their respective county, and to pay for the maintenance costs. The mounted Dorobanți also had to provide their own horses. Under a request from General Kiseleff, a uniform project for the Dorobanți was started in 1832. After several drafts were reviewed, the project was adopted the same year. According to this, the uniforms were of two types: those for the "Administrative Police" and those for the "Judiciary Police". With different colors of the piping and epaulettes for each branch, the uniforms consisted of grey pants and a coat tied with a row of 9 white metal buttons, called mundir, of navy blue color for the Dorobanți in the capital and grey color for the ones in the counties. The headdress consisted of a shako with white metal fittings and decorated with the Wallachian eagle. As the Dorobanți still had to acquire their own uniforms, the regulations were mostly followed in the cities and in the capital. In contrast, the uniforms varied in the counties, with some following the Arnaut style of clothes.

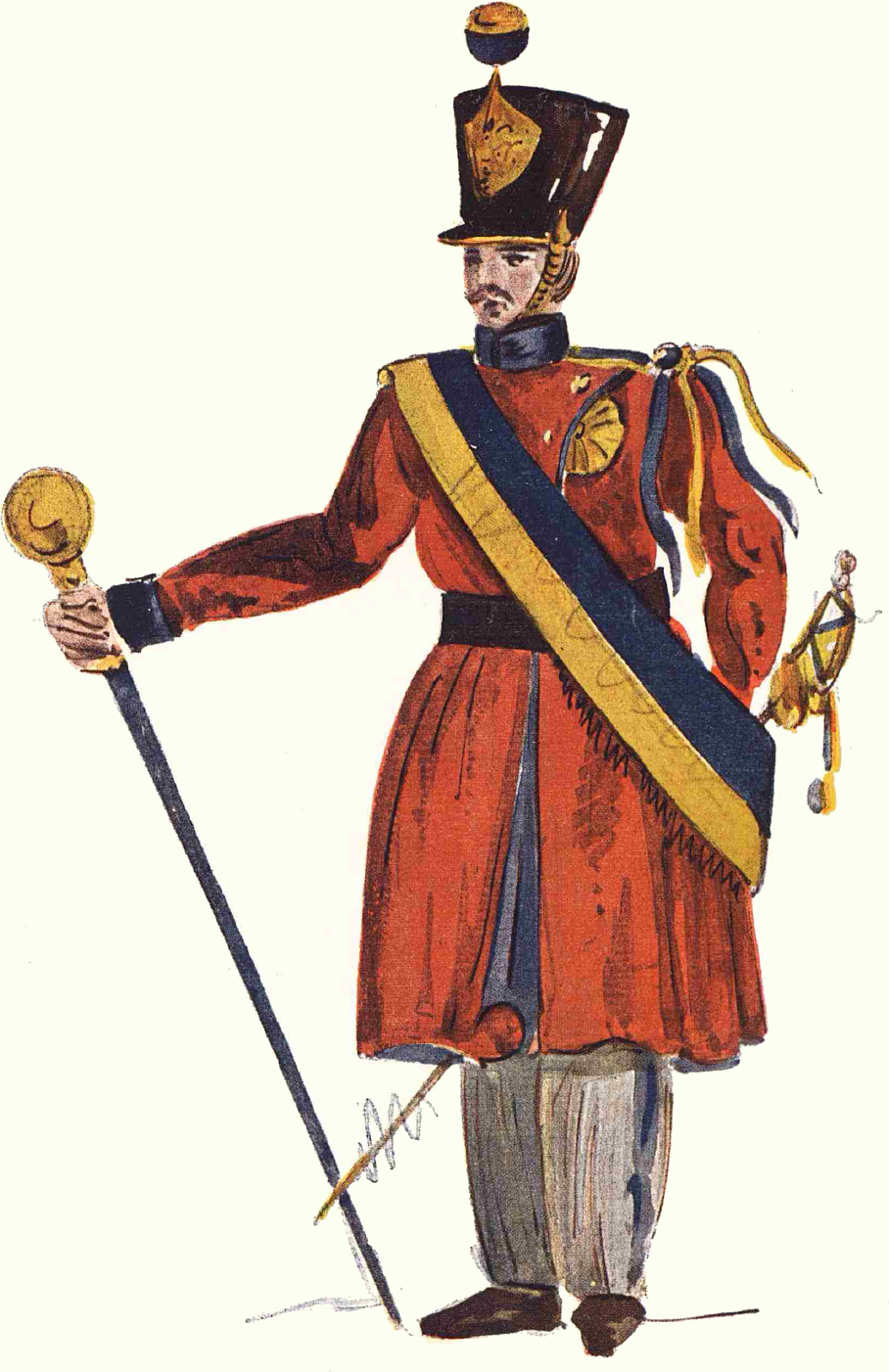
Captain of the barrier, 1832 uniform draft (Note: These drafted uniforms were not adopted and remained in project stage.)

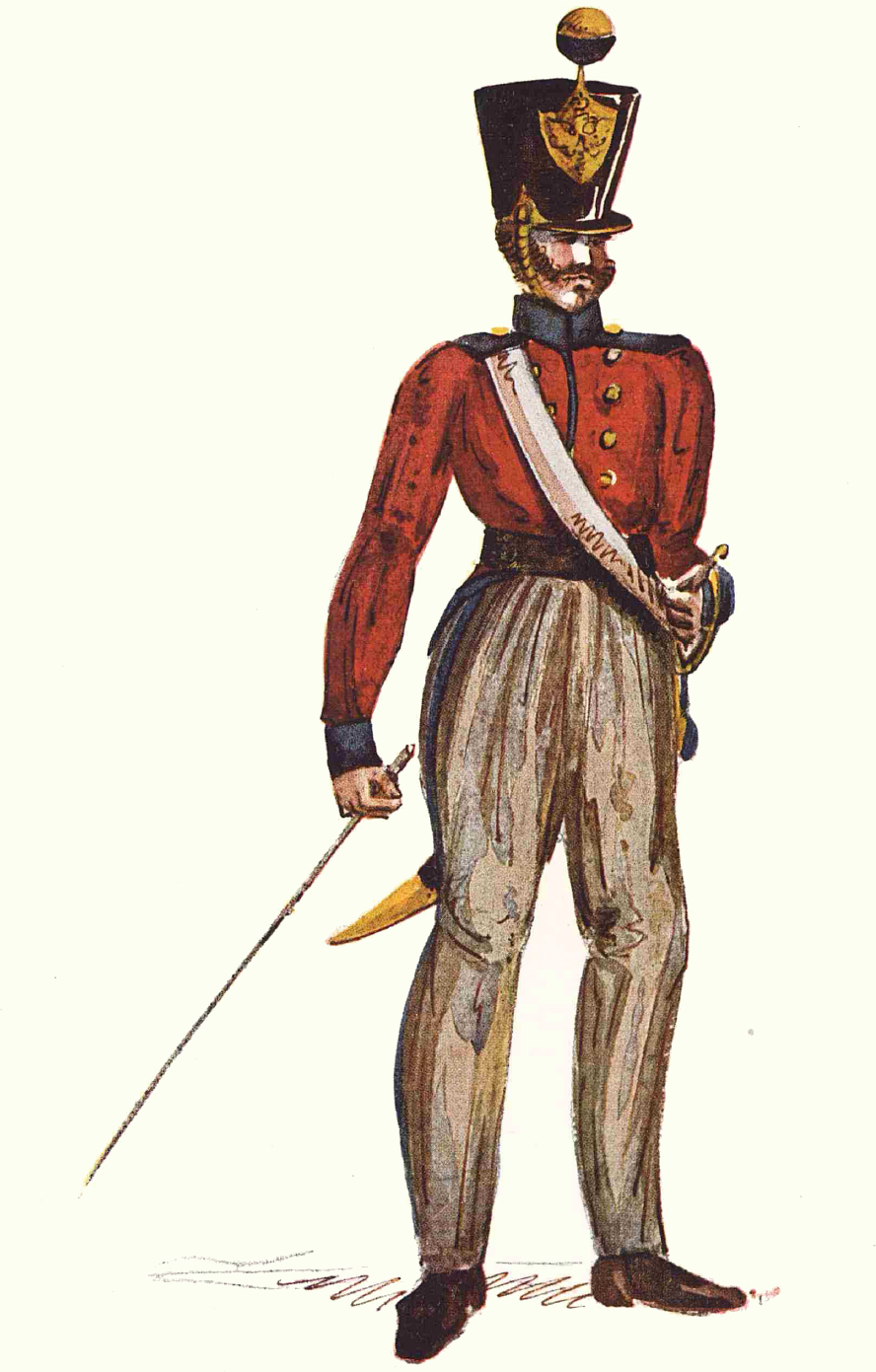
Foot Dorobanț of the Agie, 1832 uniform draft

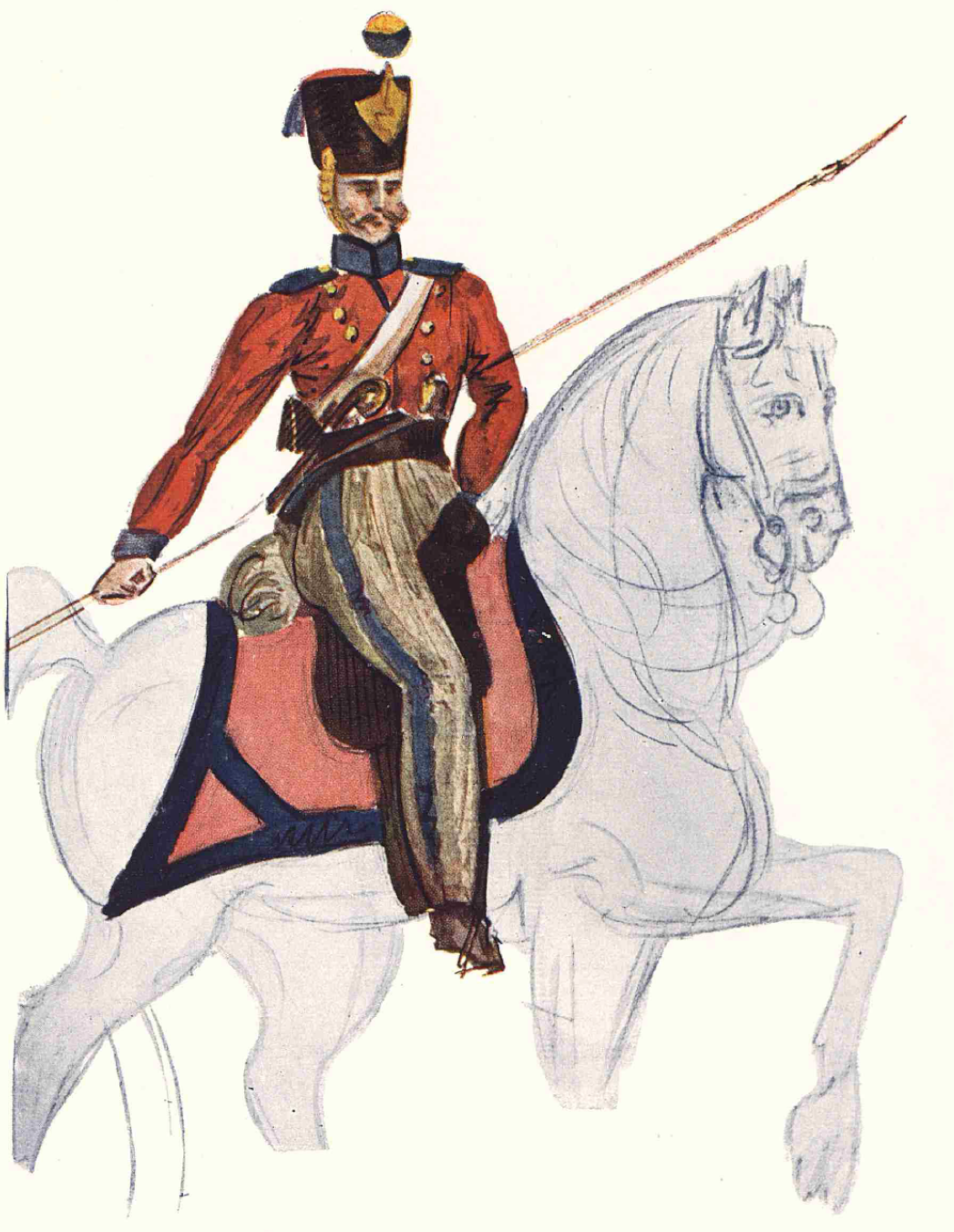
Mounted Dorobanț of the Agie, 1832 uniform draft

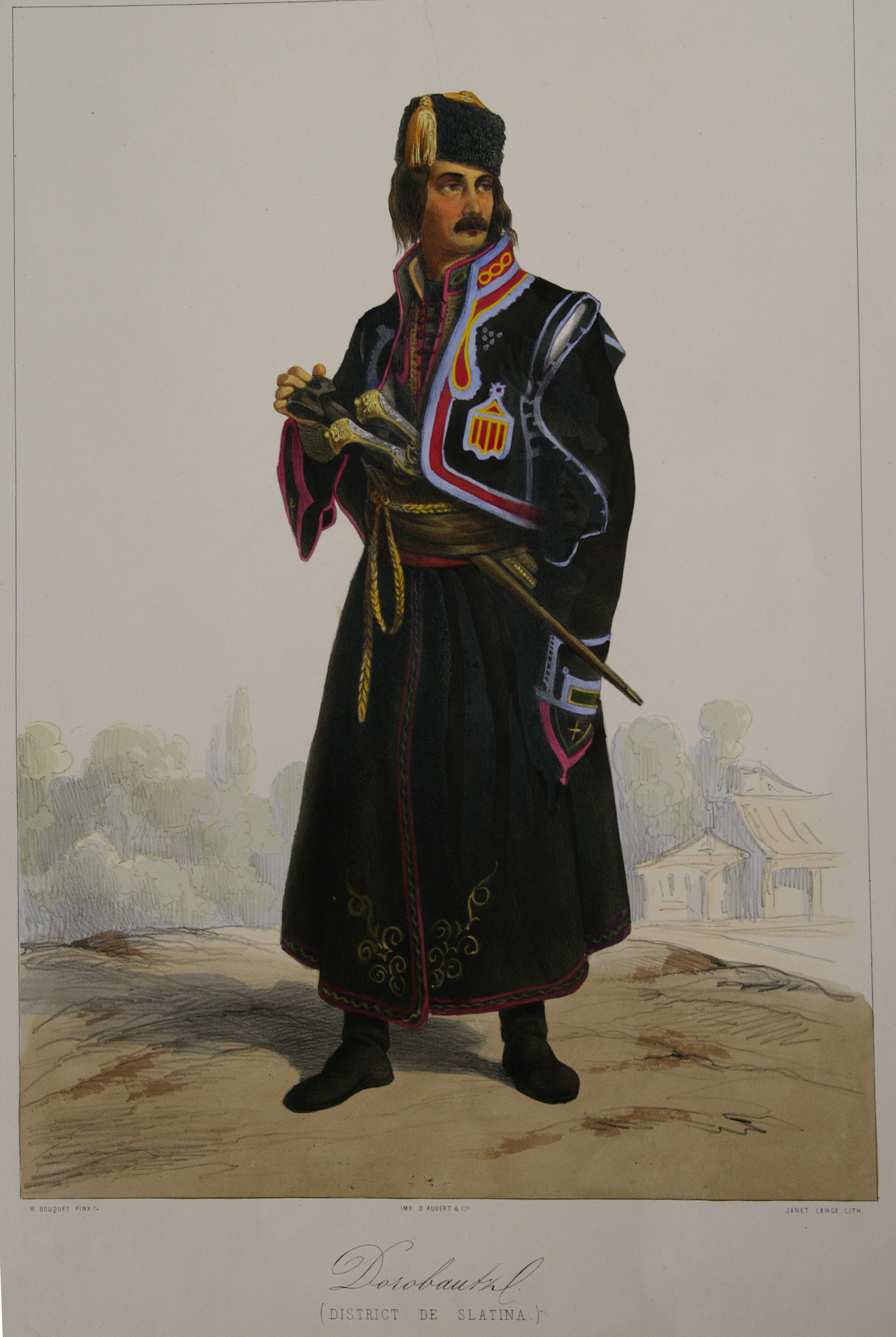
Dorobanț from Slatina wearing Arnaut styled clothes

In 1850, new uniform regulations were issued. The simpler uniforms, which could be manufactured easier, consisted of a black woolen tunic, a Caucasian style hat with a green cap and a black fur turban at the base, and white pants for the Dorobanți of the counties, while the Dorobanți of the Agie wore hats with red caps and navy blue pants. During winter, a grey army cloak could be worn.

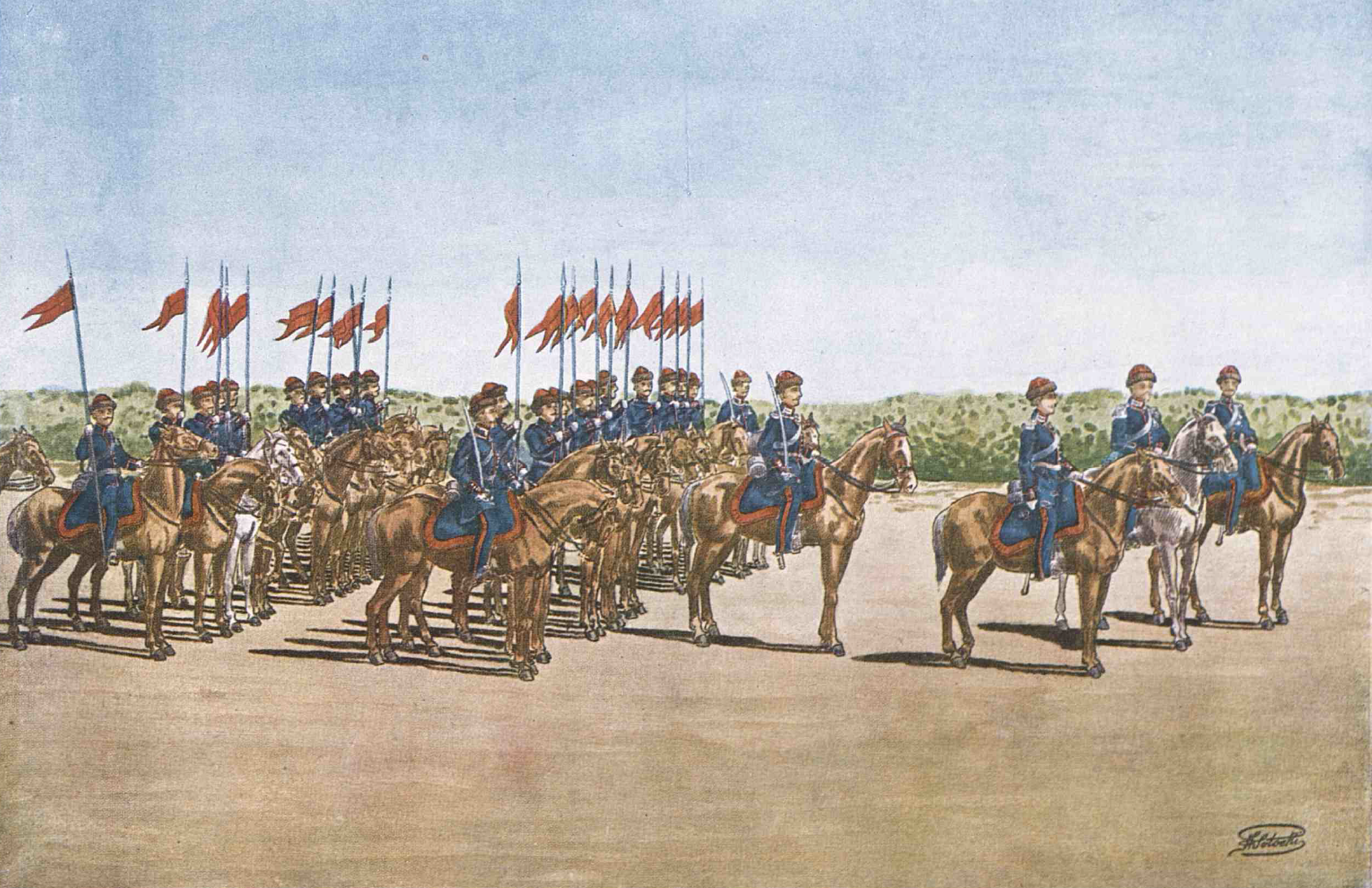
Dorobanți of the Agie

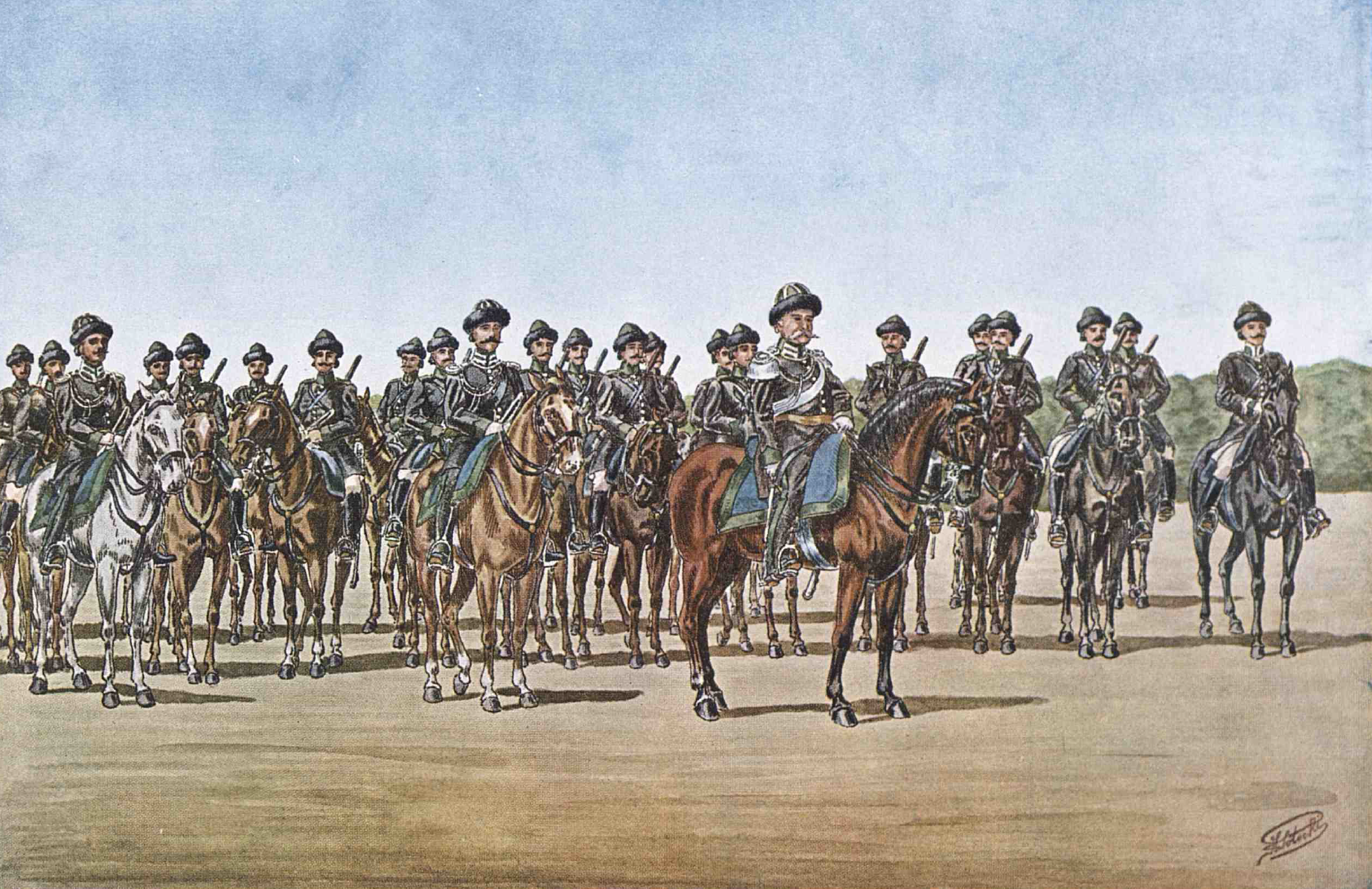
Dorobanți of the counties

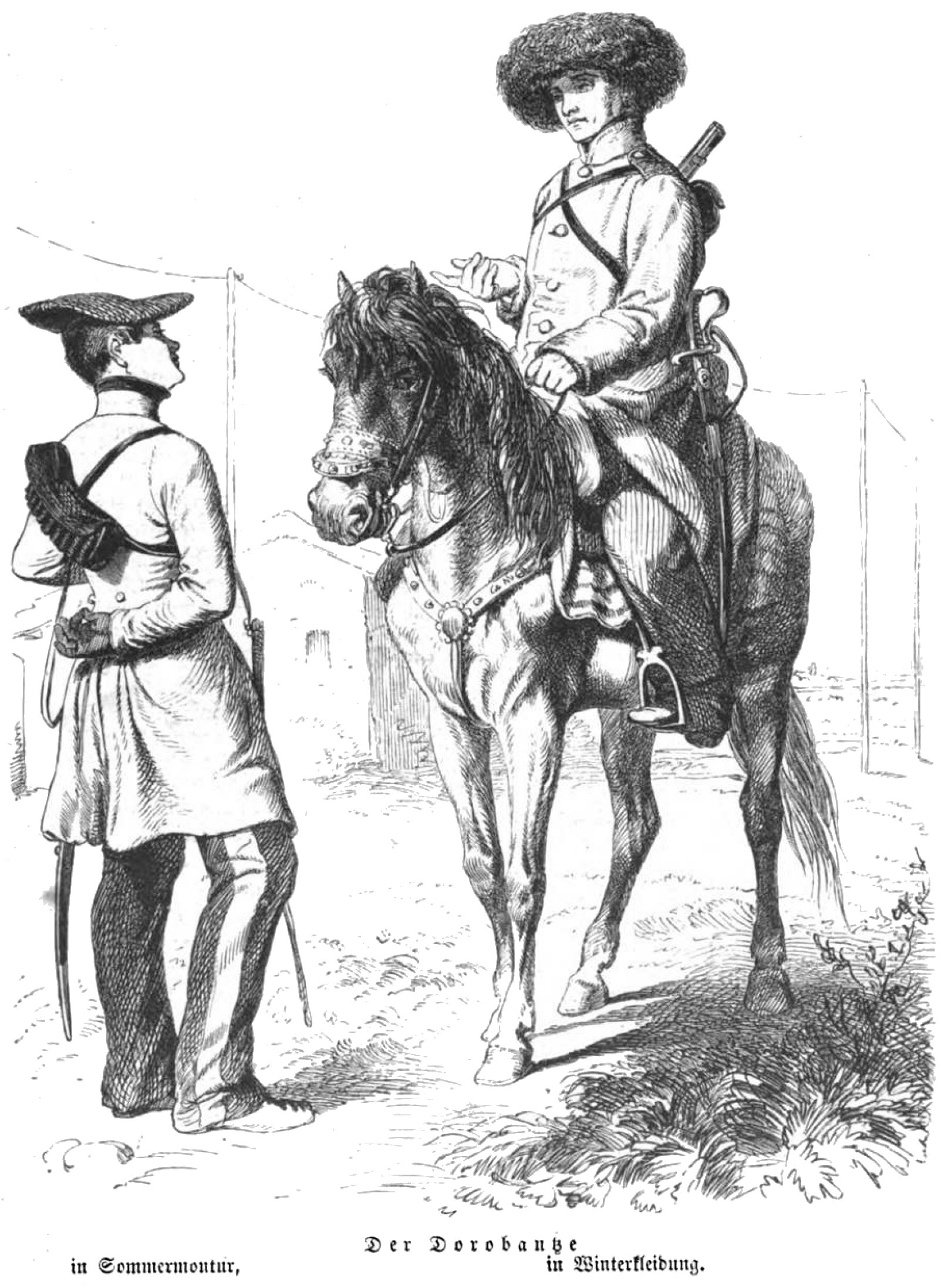
Dorobanți in 1857, summer and winter uniforms

The uniforms worn by the Dorobanți in the War of Independence were adopted in 1873. These consisted of white pants, a white cloth blouse decorated with a blue band in the front, as well as a collar, cuffs and epaulettes of the same color. The hat was made of black sheep wool with the cypher of Carol I in the front, and a tricolored cockade where the regiment number and a turkey feather was attached, which earned them the nickname "curcani" (turkeys). Footwear consisted of black boots or opinci. A grey cloak was worn during winter. The mounted Dorobanți wore a uniform consisting of a jacket with horizontal threads, embroidered pants, short boots, and black fur hats with a side flap and tassels. The ranks were displayed on the sleeves.

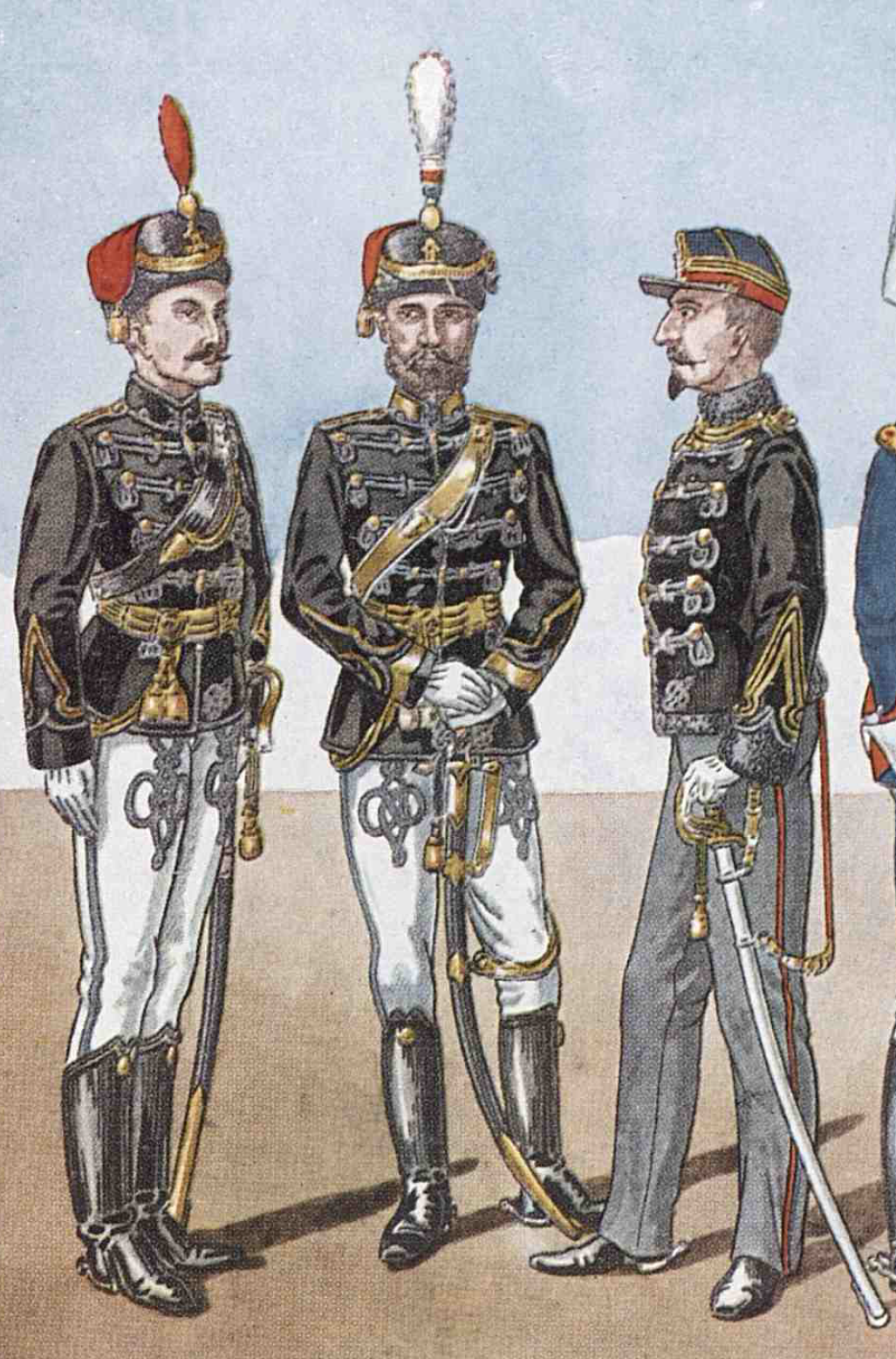
Mounted Dorobanți in 1868

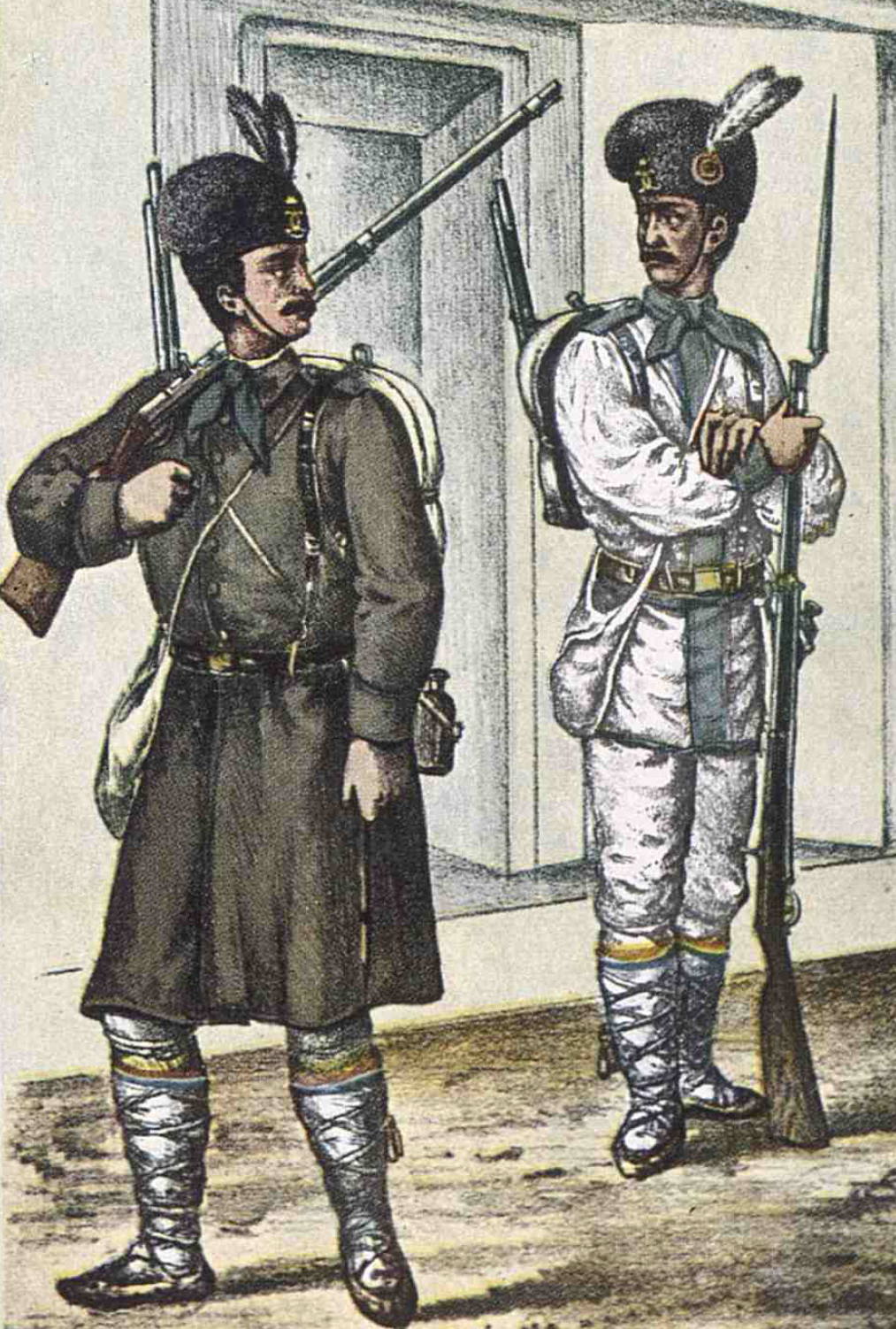
Dorobanț winter and summer uniforms in 1873

After 1891, the infantry troops wore the same uniform. From 1912, the same type of uniform was introduced for the whole army. Initially of grey-green color, these were changed to khaki after the First World War.

== Bibliography ==
- Carp, Petre; Manea, Vasilica; Florea, Cornel; Țucă, Cornel; Boțoghină, Iulian; Manaloiu, Daniela; Nicolae, Nineta (2008). Istoricul Regimentului 4 "Argeș" 1877–1946 (PDF) (in Romanian). Pitești: Editura Pământul. ISBN 9789731750811.
- Novac, Vasile (2018). "Regimentul 2 Dorobanți - Vâlcea" (PDF). Buridava (in Romanian). Râmnicu Vâlcea: Muzeul Județean "Aurelian Sacerdoțeanu" Vâlcea.
- Șerbănescu, Horia (1992). "Dorobanţii de poliție - primele formațiuni de pază și ordine ale orașului București". București - Materiale de Istorie și Muzeografie (in Romanian) (XI/2016). Bucharest: Muzeul Municipiului București. ISSN 1222-7536.
