= Rebellion of the Seimeni and Dorobanți =

Map of Hrizea's revolts

The rebellion of the Seimeni and Dorobanți or Hrizea's revolts broke out on 26–27 February 1655, in Wallachia.

The timing of the events is controversial, but the reason is Constantin Șerban's desire to deprive himself of the services of the seimeni, which Matthew Basarab relied on completely. At the beginning of the uprising, between 14 and 32 boyars were killed.

It is an uprising of both "praetorian" and ethnic origin. It was headed by Hrizea of Bogdănei, a swordsman and a foster parent. Hrizea was a bed-keeper, locksmith, and worshipper, like his mother-in-law, who was called Dragutin or Dragomir under Matthew Basarab.

The uprising was extinguished after the Battle of Hopleja on 26 June 1655.

== Bibliography ==
- Matei Cazacu, "1655: seimenii și dorobanții «...se-au rădicat asupra a tot neamul boieresc...»", in Magazin Istoric, October 1972
- Ludovic Demény, "Cu privire la caracterul răscoalei din 1655 în Țara Romînească", in Studii. Revistă de Istorie, Vol. XVI, Issue 2, 1963
- I. Ionașcu, Biserici, chipuri și documente din Olt, Vol. I. Craiova: Ramuri, 1934. OCLC 935559527
- Constantin Rezachevici, "Fenomene de criză social-politică în Țara Românească în veacul al XVII-lea (Partea a II-a: a doua jumătate a secolului al XVII-lea)", in Studii și Materiale de Istorie Medie, Vol. XIV, 1996
