= Port of Orșova =

Location
- Country: Romania
- Location: Mehedinți County

Details
- Owned by: Administratia Porturilor Dunarii Fluviale
- Type of harbour: Natural/Artificial
- Size: 50,439 square metres (5.0439 ha)
- No. of berths: 2
- General manager: Ofiteru Danut

Statistics
- Annual cargo tonnage: 1,200,000 tonnes (2008)
- Website; Official site

The Port of Orșova is one of the largest Romanian river ports, located in the city of Orșova on the Danube River.
