= Constantin Rezachevici =

Romanian historian (1943 - 2021)

- Born: January 26, 1943; Iași, Romania
- Died: January 10, 2021 (aged 77)

Constantin Rezachevici was a Romanian historian.

He published numerous papers on Dracula, also known as Vlad "The Impaler" Tepes, including:

- From the Order of the Dragon to Dracula
- The Tomb of Vlad Tepes
- Punishment with Vlad Tepes - Punishments in Europe Common and Differentiating Traits
