= Luminița (name) =

Luminiţa is a Romanian feminine given name that may refer to

- Luminița Anghel, Romanian singer
- Luminița Dinu (born 1971), Romanian handball player
- Luminița Dobrescu (born 1971), Romanian swimmer
- Luminița Gheorghiu (1949–2021), Romanian actress
- Luminița Pișcoran (born 1988), Romanian biathlete
- Luminița Talpoș (born 1972), Romanian long-distance runner
- Luminița Trombițaș (born 1971), Romanian volleyball player
- Luminița Vese, Romanian image processing researcher
- Luminita Zaituc (born 1968), German long-distance runner

== See also ==
- Elena-Luminița Cosma (born 1972), Romanian chess player
- Sorina-Luminița Plăcintă (born 1965), Romanian engineer and politician
