= Port of Călărași =

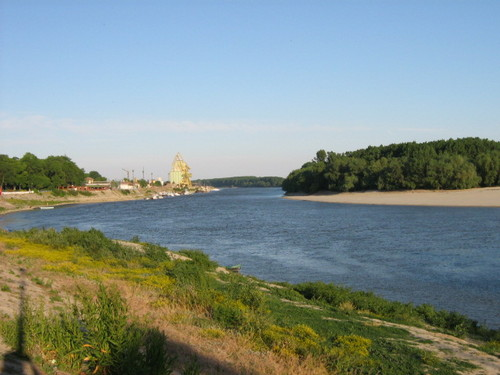

Location
- Country: Romania
- Location: Călărași County

Details
- Owned by: Administrația Porturilor Dunării Fluviale
- Type of harbour: Natural/Artificial
- Size: 213,000 square metres (21.3 ha)
- No. of berths: 4
- General manager: Dănuț Ofițeru

Statistics
- Annual cargo tonnage: 300,000 tonnes (2008)
- Website; Official site

The Port of Călărași is one of the largest Romanian river ports, located in the city of Călărași on the Danube River.
