= Port of Corabia =

Location
- Country: Romania
- Location: Olt County

Details
- Owned by: Administratia Porturilor Dunarii Fluviale
- Type of harbour: Natural/Artificial
- Size: 226,315 square metres (22.6315 ha)
- No. of berths: 2
- General manager: Ofiteru Danut

Statistics
- Annual cargo tonnage: 100,000 tonnes (2008)
- Website; Official site

The Port of Corabia is one of the largest Romanian river ports, located in the city of Corabia on the Danube River.
