= Port of Ovidiu =

River port in Constanța County, Romania

Location
- Country: Romania
- Location: Constanța County

Details
- Owned by: Administratia Canalelor Navigabile
- Type of harbour: Natural/Artificial
- Size: 44 acres (0.044 square kilometres)
- No. of berths: 2
- General manager: Ovidiu Sorin Cupșa

Statistics
- Annual cargo tonnage: 1,800,000 tonnes (2007)
- Website; Official site

The Port of Ovidiu is one of the largest Romanian river ports, located in the city of Ovidiu on the Danube-Black Sea Canal.
