= Port of Medgidia =

- Click on the map for a fullscreen view

Location
- Country: Romania
- Location: Constanța County
- Coordinates: 48°14′N 28°17′E
- UN/LOCODE: ROMED

Details
- Owned by: Administrația Canalelor Navigabile
- Type of harbour: Natural/Artificial
- Size: 50 acres (0.050 square kilometres)
- No. of berths: 22
- General manager: Ovidiu Sorin Cupșa

Statistics
- Annual cargo tonnage: 11,500,000 tonnes (2007)
- Website; Official site

The Port of Medgidia is one of the largest Romanian river ports, located in the city of Medgidia on the Danube-Black Sea Canal.
