= Port of Calafat =

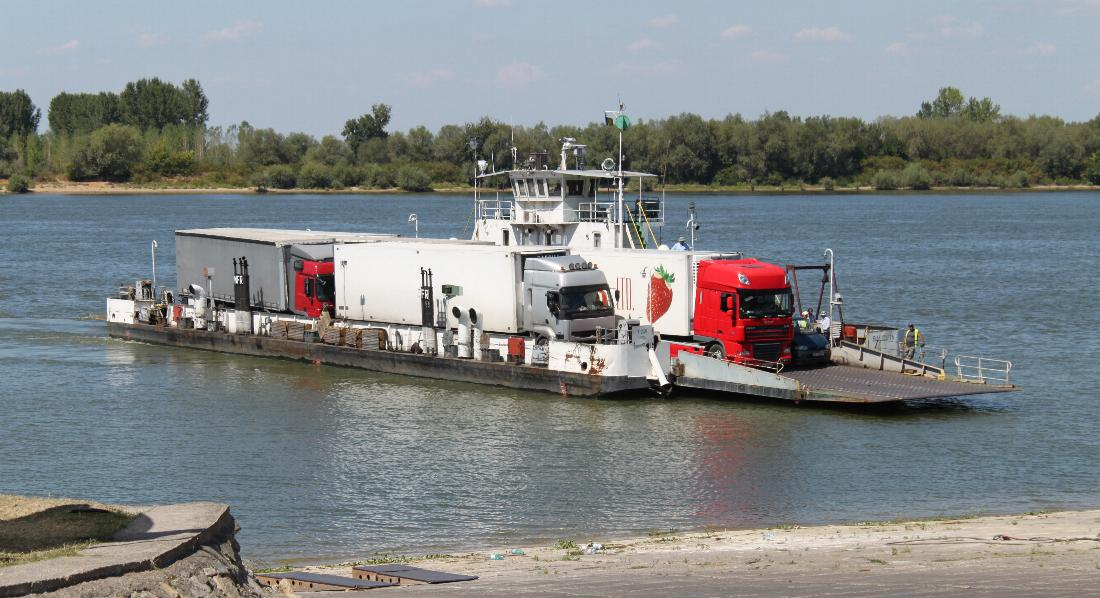
- Click on the map for a fullscreen view

Location
- Country: Romania
- Location: Dolj County
- Coordinates: 43.9972°N 22.9299°E

Details
- Owned by: Administratia Porturilor Dunarii Fluviale
- Type of harbour: Natural/Artificial
- Size: 50,968 square metres (5.0968 ha)
- No. of berths: 3
- General manager: Ofiteru Danut

Statistics
- Annual cargo tonnage: 270,000 tonnes (2008)
- Website; Official site

The Port of Calafat is one of the largest Romanian river ports, located in the city of Calafat on the Danube River.
