= Port of Giurgiu =

Location
- Country: Romania
- Location: Giurgiu County

Details
- Owned by: Compania Națională Administrația Porturilor Dunării Fluviale
- Type of harbour: Natural/Artificial
- Size: 160 acres (1.6 square kilometres)
- No. of berths: 52
- Employees: 200
- General manager: Toma Florin Petcu

Statistics
- Annual cargo tonnage: 1,500,000 tonnes (2007)
- Annual container volume: 15,000 TEU (2008)
- Website; Official site

The Port of Giurgiu is one of the largest Romanian river ports, located in the city of Giurgiu on the Danube river.

The port also has a container terminal with an annual traffic capacity of 30,000 TEU's.
