= Port of Brăila =

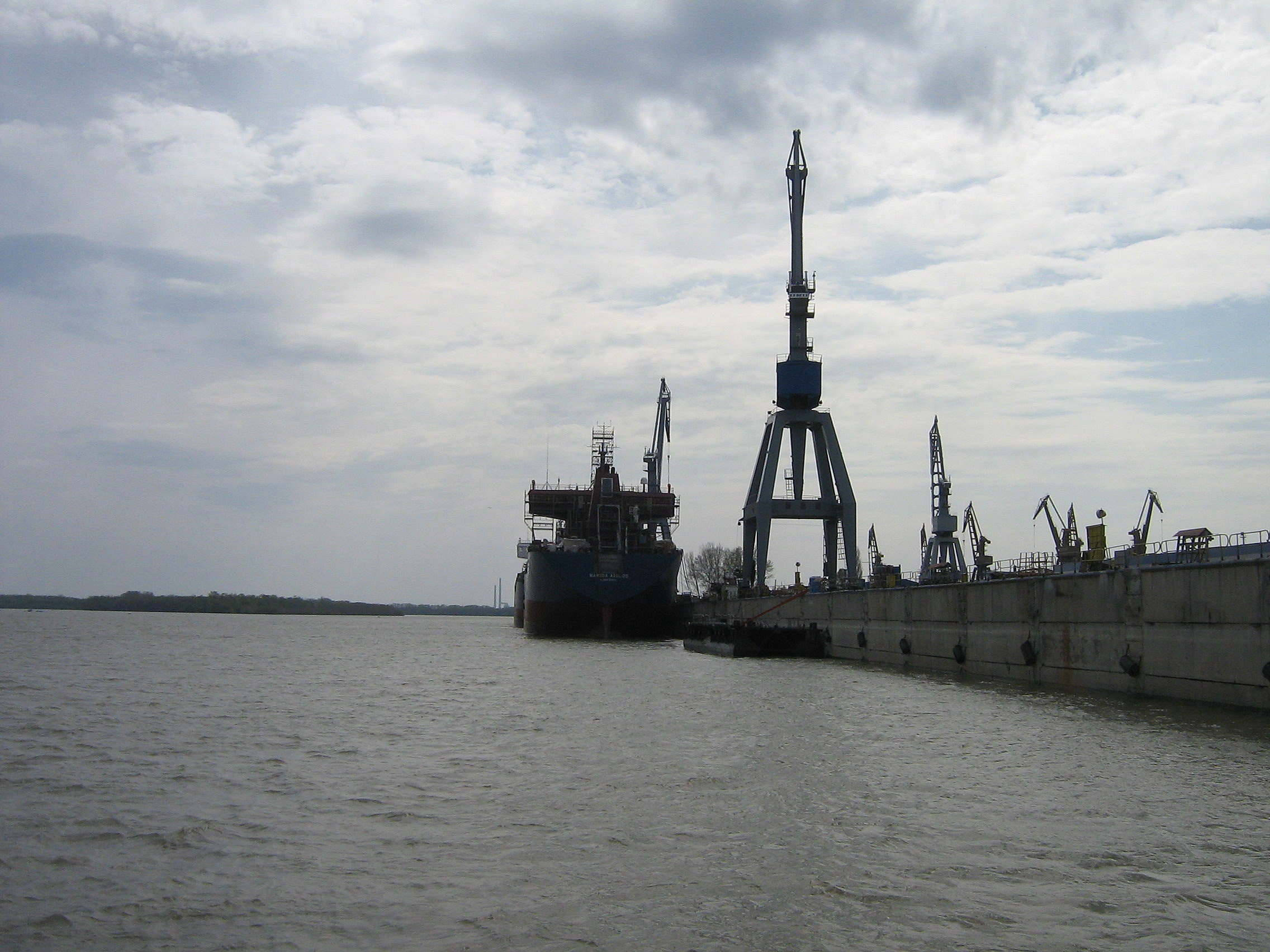

Location
- Country: Romania
- Location: Brăila County

Details
- Owned by: Compania Națională Administrația Porturilor Dunării Maritime
- Type of harbour: Natural/Artificial
- Size: 390 acres (0.39 square kilometres)
- No. of berths: 25
- General manager: Nicu Popoaca

Statistics
- Vessel arrivals: 2,088 (2008)
- Annual cargo tonnage: 2,600,000 tonnes (2008)
- Website; Official site

The Port of Brăila is one of the largest Romanian river ports. Located in the city of Brăila on the Danube river, the port is an important source of revenue for the city because many large international companies have established there.

The shipbuilding industry is a key activity of the port and Norwegian and Romanian companies are the most important enterprises established there.
