= Port of Luminița =

River port on Danube-Black Sea Canal

Location
- Country: Romania
- Location: Constanța County

Details
- Owned by: Administrația Canalelor Navigabile
- Type of harbour: Natural/Artificial
- Size: 22 acres (0.022 square kilometres)
- No. of berths: 1
- General manager: Ovidiu Sorin Cupșa

Statistics
- Annual cargo tonnage: 4,500,000 tonnes (2007)
- Website; Official site

The Port of Luminița is one of the largest Romanian river ports, located in the city of Năvodari on the Danube-Black Sea Canal.
