= Costea Bucioc =

Moldavian statesman and military commander

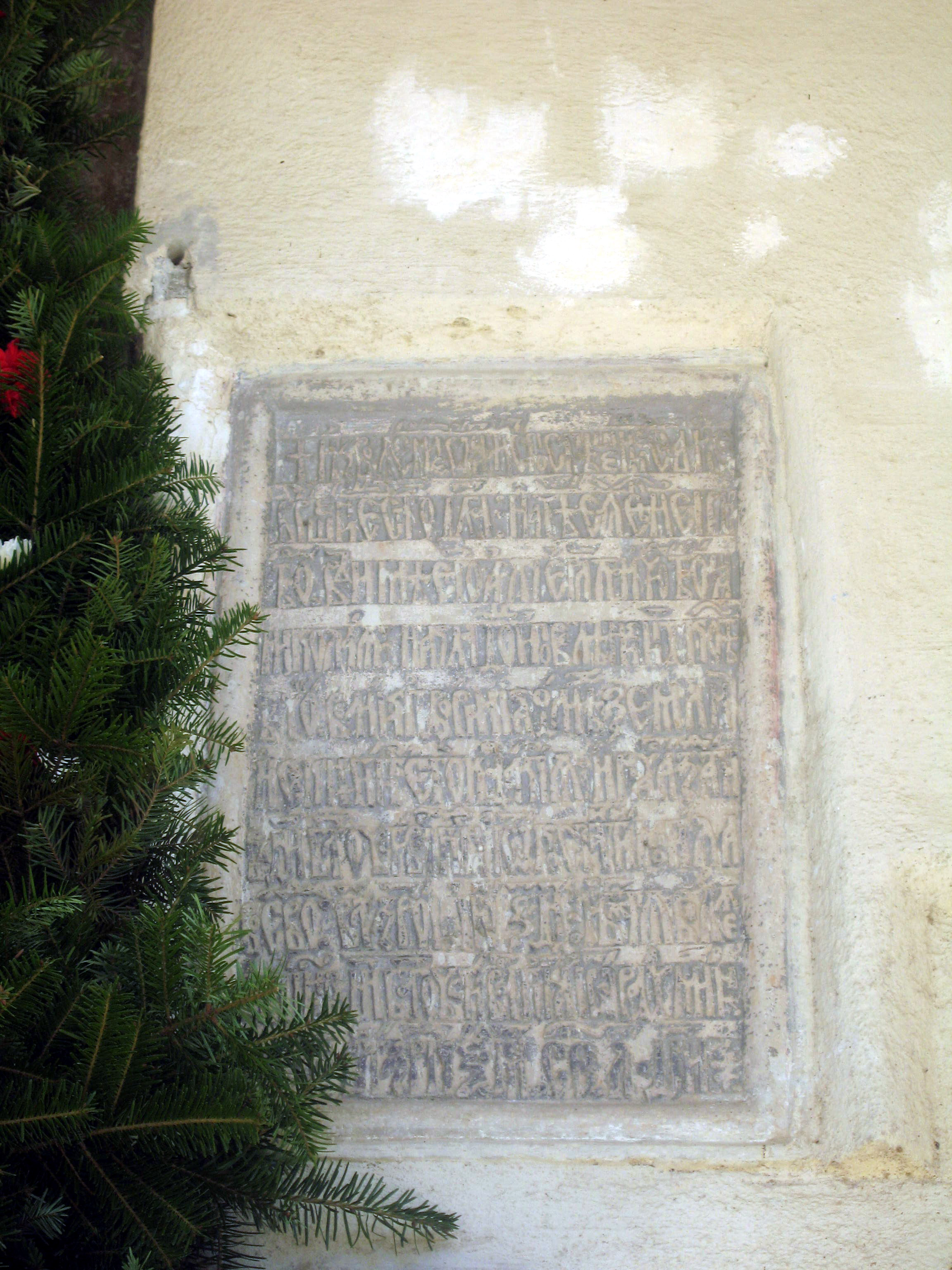
- Bucioc's inscription at Râșca Monastery, attesting his contribution as ktitor

Vornic of Moldavia
- In office August 15 – October 13, 1616
- In office May 12, 1617 – July 20, 1620

Personal details
- Died: July or September 1620 Bessarabia?
- Spouse(s): Irina Prăjescu? Candachia Șoldan
- Relations: Lupu (Vasile) Coci (son-in-law); Dumitru Buhuș (in-law); Ruxandra Khmelnytsky (granddaughter)
- Children: Lupașcu Bucioc; Ionașco Bucioc; Tudosca (Lupu) Coci; Lady Moțoc

Military service
- Allegiance: Moldavia
- Years of service: 1585–1620
- Commands: Moldavian military forces Budjak mercenaries?
- Battles/wars: Moldavian Magnate Wars Polish–Ottoman War (1620–21): Battle of Țuțora?

Costea Bucioc or Coste Băcioc (also known as Büczek; ? – July or September 1620) was a Moldavian statesman, commander of the military forces, and father-in-law of Prince Lupu (Vasile) Coci. He began his political career in the 1580s, emerging in the late 1590s as an ally of the Movilești dynasty, with then-Prince Ieremia Movilă advancing him to the post of Clucer. From 1601, he was Constantin Movilă's Paharnic, receiving from him the estate of Deleni and other villages around Hârlău, which formed part of a Bucioc domain that also extended into Bukovina and Bessarabia. Together with the Movilești, he became one of the great landowners of his generation, and one of the first Moldavian boyars known to have owned serfs. Some of his assets went into refurbishing Râșca Monastery, of which he was patron, or ktitor.

As an army leader, Costea was involved in the Moldavian Magnate Wars, during which the Polish–Lithuanian Commonwealth fought to emancipate its Movilești clients from subservience to the Ottoman Empire. Although Buciuc followed the princely family into its Polish exile in 1611 or 1612, he criticized Constantin's repeated attempts to reconquer Moldavia. During the events that led to Constantin's defeat and drowning, he became a supporter of the Ottoman-appointed Radu Mihnea, emerging as great Vornic of the Lower Country. Bucioc maintained his standing under Prince Gaspar Graziani, despite a mutual hostility: reportedly, Graziani tried to poison his Vornic, and arrested Coci. The former two had reconciled by 1620, when Graziani involved Moldavia on the Polish side in a new war with the Ottomans, fought on Moldavian territory. While Coci spoke out against the project, Bucioc may have commanded the Moldavian troops and been present for the defeat at Țuțora. He was eventually captured by the enemy, possibly after attempting to hide in Braniște. He was finally a prisoner of Iskender Pasha, who had him impaled on charges of treason.

As an Ottoman loyalist, Coci climbed through the ranks of boyardom, and finally became Prince, as "Vasile Lupu" in 1634. Bucioc's grandchildren were Ioan Coci, who was at the center of his father's project for a takeover in Wallachia, but died young in 1639. His father's regime survived to 1653, by which time Bucioc's other granddaughter, Ruxandra, had become wife and widow of Tymofiy Khmelnytsky, an Otaman of the Cossack Hetmanate. Another granddaughter, Maria, moved to Lithuania with her husband Janusz Radziwiłł. The Bucioc inheritance, including Deleni, finally went to collateral relatives, who formed a Moldavian branch of the Cantacuzino family. The Vornic's life was revisited in literature by V. A. Urechia, whose eponymous play was a major success in the 1860s and '70s.

== Biography ==
=== With and against the Movilești ===
Bucioc was born during a time when Moldavia and Wallachia, the Danubian Principalities, were submitted to the Ottomans as tributary states. He probably belonged to the boyar aristocracy by right, being the son of an Ion Băcioc, who may or may not have been a Vornic, and brother of an Ilea Băcioc. His uncles included a Dumitrașco Mălai, father of the Vistier (treasurer) Simion Mălai. Costea's own career probably began in the 1580s: a 1585 writ by Prince Peter the Lame confirms Bucioc as an administrator (or Pârcălab) of Hotin. The same document refers to Bucioc's earlier purchase, from Prince Iancu Sasul, of a village called Lunca Mare, with free use of its population as serfs or vecini (Church Slavonic: сȢсѣды); this is the first mention of such a category in Moldavia's history, and among the first in medieval Romanian history.

On February 20, 1598, Prince Ieremia Movilă made Bucioc Pârcălab of Orhei, also giving him a seat on the Boyar Council. After the brief conquest of Moldavia by Michael the Brave and the presence of Marcu Cercel on the Moldavian throne (1600), Bucioc regained high offices under the returning Ieremia. On March 4, 1601, he was attested as a Clucer, his tenure ending on August 30, 1603. Bucioc is not known to have held any office between that date and July 15, 1608, when another Movilești, the young monarch Constantin, appointed him great Paharnic. He was again mentioned as holding that position on September 28 of the following year, and served to November 19, 1611.

According to various reports of the period, Constantin granted his Paharnic an estate at Deleni, in Fălciu County. Various scholars believe that he was by then married to Irina Prăjescu, daughter of a tax farmer from Suceava. This connection would have made Bucioc a member by proxy of the extended Movilești clan. According to such readings, she was the mother of his two sons, Lupașcu and Ionașco. Costea's brother had wed Lupa Toader, daughter of Vistier Iosif Veveriță. Costea's niece Ileana went on to marry Dumitru Buhuș, also a Vistier.

Later, Costea is known to have been married to a Candachia Șoldan, daughter of the Logothete Pătrașcu Năbădaico Șoldan. From her family, Bucioc received as a gift the estate of Rușii, outside Deleni, which probably contained a deserted Ruthenian (or Ukrainian) village. He also inherited from Pătrașcu a number of vineyards outside Cotnari, and several vacated villages around Hârlău. The latter were in fact purchased from the Prince as a disguised form of financial assistance for the central authority, which was at the time beleaguered by Ottoman fiscal demands. As noted by the agricultural historian Radu Rosetti, the Bucioc family helped the Movilești exercise control over Moldavia's land fund through original accumulation, thus eliminating competition from other boyars. By 1620 Costea, a "consumer of estates", had 38 or 39 villages to his name. Some were in the eastern region later known as Bessarabia (presently, Moldova), including parts of Hîncești that he later sold, as well as Vădeni.

Prince Constantin's Polonophilia was viewed with alarm by his own liege, the Sultan Ahmed I, who put up Ștefan Tomșa as a replacement. The Movilești, led by a dowager princess Elisabeta Movilă, decided to resist the Ottoman Army. Alongside Nestor Ureche, Bucioc led a delegation of boyars to the Polish king, Sigismund III Vasa, asking for military support. The plan failed, and the Movilești, initially barricaded in Hotin Fortress, entered Poland at Kamieniec. Tomșa declined Bucioc's services, and under his subsequent rule he appears as "former great Paharnic". During that interval, Bucioc was a ktitor of Râșca Monastery, which had been devastated in 1574 by Crimean Tatars. His restoration of the building included the addition of a porch or peristyle which art historians describe as "unusually large" or "distasteful".

From exile, the Movilești still made attempts to recover Moldavia, but their expedition of July 1612 ended in defeat at Cornul lui Sas. Constantin was captured by Tomșa's allies from the Budjak Horde, and accidentally drowned while in its custody. At some point in 1611 or 1612, Bucioc joined the Movilești in Uście (Ustia). While here, he purchased Bobulești, in Dorohoi county, from Princess Ana, a descendant of Alexandru Lăpușneanu. This period cemented Bucioc's alliance with Ureche, together with whom he instigated riots against Radu Mihnea. However, by 1616 both had become dissidents, refusing to return to Moldavia with his new liege, Alexandru Movilă—reportedly, Ureche argued that doing so would have been certain death. After some early successes, which included making Alexandru Prince of Moldavia and obtaining more support from exiled Wallachians under Radu Șerban, the Movilești and their Polish backers were defeated at Drăcșani by a coalition of Ottomans and Ottoman vassals, under Iskender Pasha. Alexandru was forcefully converted to Islam, while Elisabeta became an Ottoman sex slave. According to historian Gavril Luca, Bucioc was actually in Tomșa's camp during the Drăcșani debacle, leading into battle a 2,000-strong regiment of Tatar mercenaries.

=== As Vornic ===
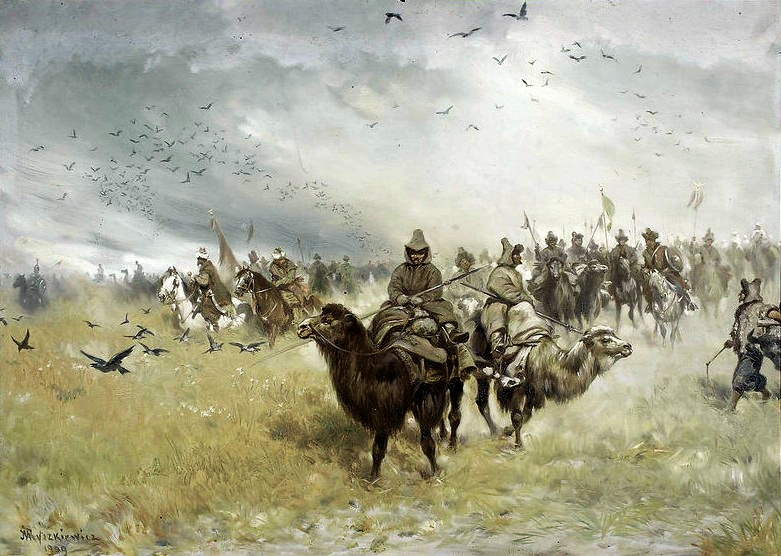
Budjak Tatars fighting for the Ottoman Army, ahead of the battle at Țuțora. Gouache painting by Józef Ryszkiewicz, 1909

Bucioc had switched his loyalties toward Radu Mihnea, the Ottoman-appointed Prince, and was thus able to return to Moldavia. On August 15, 1616, Bucioc was appointed great Vornic of the Lower Country. He maintained this office to October 13, but was reinstated on May 12, 1617, though he was probably moved to the Upper Country (or Bukovina). His Deleni estate was briefly confiscated by princely command. Radu Mihnea eventually reinstated Bucioc as owner, with a writ in which he apologized for having believed the testimonies of "mendacious men". According to historian Daniel Botezatu, the document may show that Radu Mihnea intended to warn his subordinate about what would happen should he switch sides again.

Through the Șoldans, Bucioc was ultimately related to the Cantacuzino family, which rose to prominence later that century. Iordaki, son of Andronikos Kantakouzenos, was his brother-in-law, having married another one of Pătrașcu Năbădaico's daughters, Catrina (some authors describe Catrina as Costea's own daughter). Simion Mălai also became brothers-in-law with his cousin by marrying a third Șoldan sister, Alexandra. The three brothers-in-law shared a deed for the ownership of Trifăuți, on Bessarabia's border with Podolia. According to historian N. Stoicescu, Bucioc remarried later in life, to a daughter of Hetman Orăș, whose name is unrecorded. However, records from 1626 show that Candachia was still alive, and describe her as his wife.

By 1620, Bucioc's children also included two daughters. Tudosca, who may have been Irina Prăjescu's daughter, married Radu Mihnea's Postelnic, Lupu Coci; the other daughter, name unknown, married another Vornic, Gheorghe Moțoc. According to researcher Constantin Gane, Bucioc "must have understood what [Coci] was made of", selecting as his son-in-law someone "dashing, daring, courageous and ambitious, above all else ambitious." Tudosca's dowry included the village of Șerbești, which became a residence of the Coci family, the villages of Fărcășeni and Avrămești, which Lupu later donated to his Trei Ierarhi Monastery, and a townhouse at Iași.

In February 1619, Radu Mihnea presented his resignation to the Sultan. Bucioc's tenure was not interrupted by the enthronement of a new Prince, Gaspar Graziani (February 4, 1619); he served to July 20, 1620. Nevertheless, an account popularized later in the 17th century by Miron Costin claims that Graziani attempted to poison Bucioc, as well as imprisoning his son-in-law Coci. As Costin reports, Bucioc was saved because he carried with him an antidote. In April 1620, the two statesmen were on good terms, with Graziani awarding Bucioc another Bessarabian estate, at Mărculești.

That year, Graziani realigned Moldavia with the Commonwealth, and the subsequent war with the Ottomans was fought mostly on Moldavian territory. According to one reading, Graziani assigned command of the Moldavian army to Bucioc, who, in September 1620, fought alongside the Poles, and lost, a decisive battle at Țuțora. Following this, Bucioc and his supporters withdrew into Poland, but were captured by the Tatars, and delivered to Iskender Pasha. Another version is that he never had a military role to play in the conflict, and as early as July went into hiding at Braniște, hoping that his godson, the Bessarabian boyar Toader Brănișteriul, would protect him. He was betrayed and taken in chains to the Ottoman encampment. The Ottoman Empire deemed him a traitor, alleging his participation in the massacre of expatriate Turks, which Graziani had seen through. Iskender ordered Bucioc's impalement or, as Costin puts it, "immediately had him pierced through, this poor man Bucioc, who was always such a good adviser to Prince Gaspar". His biographers provide various dates for the execution: some argue that it occurred on July 20, others propose late September.

== Legacy ==
=== The Coci ascendancy ===
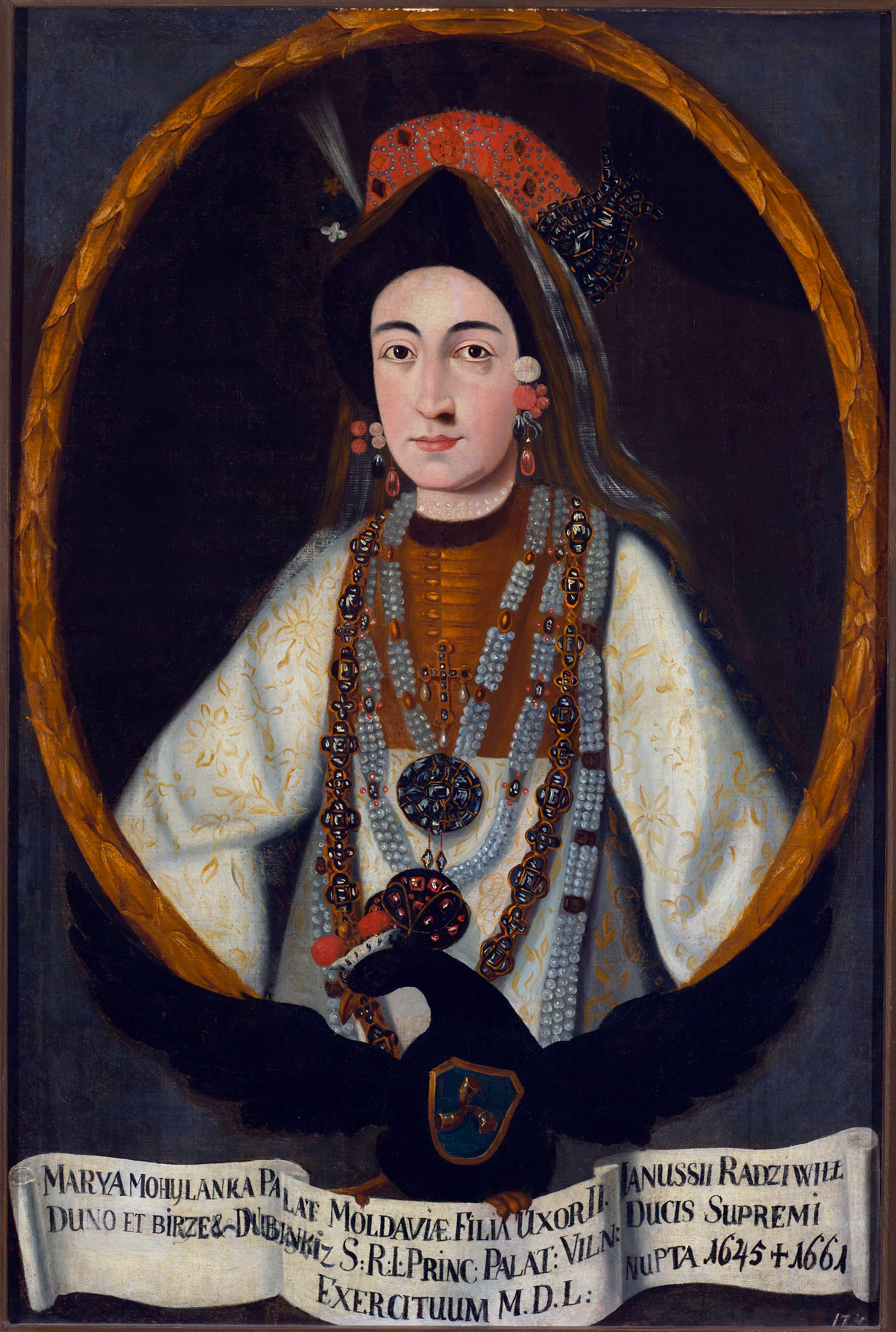
Bucioc's granddaughter, Maria Radziwiłł, in a 1730s painting

After taking over Graziani's throne, Alexandru Iliaș confiscated some of the Bucioc family assets, donating his plot in Cotnari to Saint Sava Monastery of Berzunți; in 1622, Tomșa was again Prince, and as such restored ownership of Vădeni to the Buciocs. Both of Bucioc's sons were still active in the early 1630s, when, with Moise Movilă emerging as Prince, Lupașcu served terms as Vornic. His brother-in-law Coci had been opposed to Graziani's anti-Ottoman policies, and therefore enjoyed a steady rise through the boyar ranks under Alexandru Iliaș, then under new reigns by Tomșa and Radu Mihnea. Himself a great Vornic of the Lower Country in 1630, he became a kingmaker, led a pro-Ottoman revolt against Miron Barnovschi. He was eventually appointed Prince in 1634, taking a new name, Vasile Lupu. From Tudosca, who was his first wife, Lupu had three children: a son, Ioan, and two daughters, Maria and Ruxandra. Some scholars believe that Tudosca may have had a third daughter, whose precise name and career are disputed. Another contentious issue is the claim that Ioan and Maria were not Tudora's children, but in fact born to a Lady Basilissa (or Vasilisa). Scholars such as Gavril Luca and Ștefan S. Gorovei dismiss this as a legend.

By 1638, although frail and viewed as an infirm, Ioan Coci was groomed to take over as Prince of Wallachia. This plan was curbed by Wallachia's Matei Basarab, who became bitter rivals with Prince Vasile. Both Ioan and his mother were dead by 1640. As argued by Gane, Prince Vasile then married his anonymous daughter to Giovanni Antonio Grillo, who was Dragoman for the Republic of Venice (and a relative of Angelo Grillo). The father- and son-in-law were enemies by 1648, when Grillo was sent to a Moldavian prison; he and his wife probably left the country together. According to Luca, this account relies on an error by, or mistranslation from, Paul of Aleppo. The narrative, he argues, refers to Ruxandra's early life, and the marriage it describes was in fact an engagement.

In 1652, Ruxandra was married off to Tymofiy Khmelnytsky of the Cossack Hetmanate. Khmelnytsky's support was crucial in Moldavia's subsequent clash with Wallachia, but defeat in that conflict resulted in his death and in Lupu's dethronement. She opted to live in Cossack Podolia, at Rashkiv (Rașcov) and Yampil. She married a second time, to Andriy Antonovsky, a member of the Hetmanate's starshyna—when he died, Ruxandra came under the watch of her former brother-in-law, Yurii Khmelnytsky, who reportedly treated her as his hostage. In 1658, her half-brother, Ștefăniță Lupu, who had managed to obtain the Moldavian throne, besieged Rashkiv, hoping to kidnap Ruxandra.

In 1644, after a lengthy dispute between Vasile and his boyars, Maria Coci had become the wife of Janusz Radziwiłł, the Grand Hetman of Lithuania. She was noted as the patron of the Orthodox church in Kėdainiai. Maria died a childless widow in Slutsk, having for long been engaged in a patrimonial dispute with her tutor, Bogusław Radziwiłł. Following her death, the dispute was taken up by Ruxandra and Ștefăniță. The latter also died, in 1662, while Ruxandra survived for 25 more years, the last of which were spent in Moldavia, either at Deleni or at Preutești. She was killed there in 1687, during another Polish invasion of Moldavia, by Cossacks who failed to recognize her, or were only interested in her wealth.

=== Other echoes ===
Before its demise in 1653, the Lupu regime had promoted Coste's grandson, Coste (or Costache) Moțoc, who began his career as Pârcălab of Hotin. Buhuș was another of Lupu's trusted boyars, as was his son (and Costea's grandnephew), generally known by the maternal surname, as Miron Băcioc. Miron's sister, Anastasia Buhuș, married George Ducas and became the Princess-consort in 1665. Through his mother Catinca Șoldan, the Spatharios Iordache Toderașco Cantacuzino was another close ally of the Coci family, viewing himself as Ruxandra's cousin and Costea's nephew. One branch of the Cantacuzinos was named after the estate of Deleni, which they had inherited from the Buciocs and the Cocis. Also as a result of their connection to Costea, the Deleanus owned Rușii and half of Horodnici, in Bukovina, as well as, possibly, parts of Năvîrneț. The Mălai family inherited the former village of Pișcani, in Iași County, which in February 1657 they sold to the Moțocs, whom they still viewed as their kin, through Costea.

Bucioc's life and its retelling by Costin have also left traces in modern Romanian literature. In 1867, Bucioc's story was revisited by V. A. Urechia, who rewrote it as a drama, or melodrama, eponymously called Vornicul Bucioc. In this retelling, Graziani is the "evil genius of tragedy rather than drama", secretly in love with Bucioc's virtuous wife, referred to as "Irina". His penchant for corruption allows two of Bucioc's boyar rivals, Șeptilici and Goia, to maneuver against the Vornic, and ultimately to frame him; his arrest sparks a popular revolt, prompting Graziani to release him, but then to also try and poison him. When this fails, Șeptilici and Goia attempt to murder Bucioc during an archery contest, but only manage to kill Irina. The climax of the play is provided by the Ottoman invasion, which surprises both the Prince and the Vornic, who are then taken to their deaths. In the final scene, "Bucioc heads for the stake to protect his prince, sacrificing a revenge at hand to save his motherland".

Urechia's version was first produced for the National Theater Bucharest by Ștefan Vellescu, who also starred in it, and was remembered as one of Vellescu's "greatest hits". Feminist writer Constanța Dunca Schaiu immediately saluted it as a "manifestation against pessimism" which allowed Romania to consider herself "an oriental France". She viewed Irina as a prototype of the "great woman", realistic in that she loves her husband more than her country, and in that she "needs her servants for encouragement." Ten years later, in 1877, Ghimpele newspaper argued that the play had made Urechia "one of [Romania's] greatest writers." The enthusiasm declined sharply in later decades. As noted by critic Ioan Massoff, Vornicul Bucioc stirred up "something like a popular movement" on its premiere, but, by 1900, "none of [Urechia's] plays was even being produced".
