= Samuel Korecki's expedition to Moldavia =

- Part of Moldavian–Polish War; Polish–Ottoman Wars
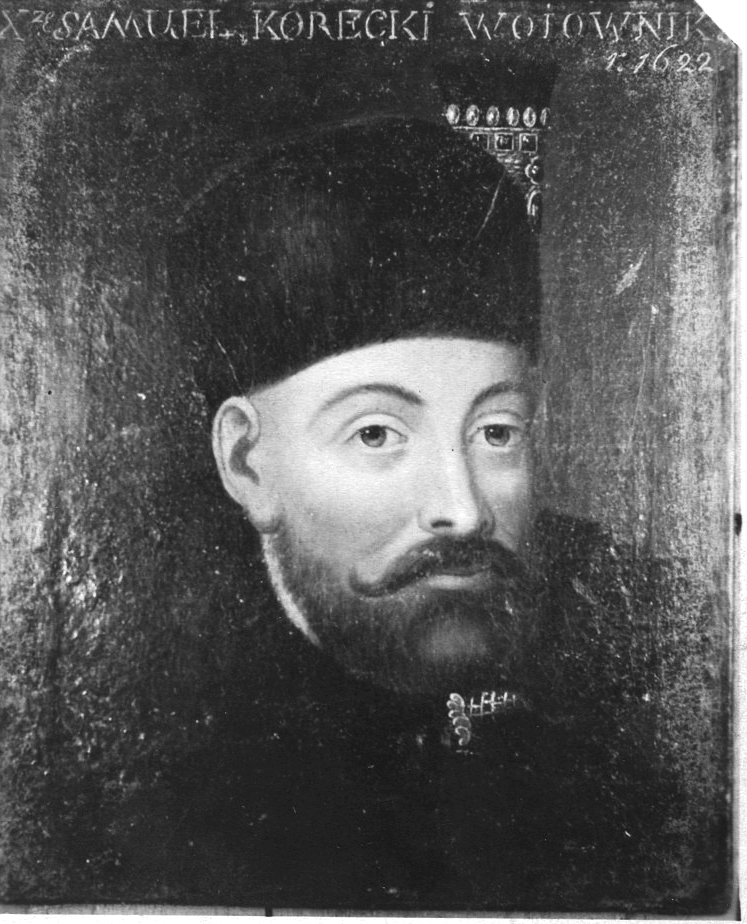
- Samuel Korecki
Date	1615–1616
Location	Iași and Țuțora, Moldavia
Result	Moldavian–Ottoman–Tatar victory

Belligerents
Samuel Korecki's troops Moldavian opposition	Moldavia; Ottoman Empire; Crimean Khanate; Wallachia

Commanders and leaders
Samuel Korecki (POW); Michał Wiśniowiecki; Alexandru Movilă; Elisabeta Movilă	Ștefan IX Tomșa (Ottoman Empire) Ahmed I Radu Mihnea

Samuel Korecki's expedition to Moldavia in 1615–1616 was an unsuccessful military intervention aimed at placing on the Moldavian throne Alexandru Movila, who was favorable to Samuel Korecki. Korecki, despite initial successes, was defeated by the Ottoman-Tatar-Moldavian army in the Battle of Cornul lui Sas in 1616, after which he was captured and imprisoned in Yedikule prison. However, Korecki managed to escape and return to Poland in the spring of 1618.

== Background ==
Samuel Korecki married the daughter of Moldavian hospodar Ieremia Movilă, famous for her beauty Catherine, which drew him and his wife's brothers-in-law into dynastic struggles in Moldavia and Wallachia.

Ieramia Movila died in 1606, orphaning the ambitious widow Elisabeta and several children who were still underage. In view of this, the throne fell to Ieremia's brother Simion, who after less than a year in power died under not entirely clear circumstances. He was probably poisoned by Elizabeth. However, Simion's son Mikhail came to the throne in Moldavia, which led to a bloody civil war. The Polish nobility intervened in the war, Stanisław Zolkiewski stood up for Mikhail and the Potocki and Wiśniowiecki families stood up for Elisabeta, and in 1607 a private army of the Potocki family marched into Moldavia, defeating the opposition at the battle of Stefanesti and placing Elisabeth's eldest son Constantin on the throne.

The change of power in Moldavia was opposed by the Ottomans, to whom Moldavia was paying tribute at the time, and in 1611 they dethroned Constantin and appointed Ștefan IX Tomșa as the new hospodar. Tomșa banished Elisabeta from the country, who sought help in Poland, in 1612 Stefan Potocki set out to help Elisabeta, whose expedition, however, was not successful, and the candidate for the throne Constantin, who accompanied him, died while crossing the Dnieper, Stefan Potocki himself was taken prisoner.

After Constantine's death, Elisabeth did not give up the Moldavian throne and wanted to make Alexandru the new hospodar. While staying in Poland she met Samuel Korecki who offered her his help.

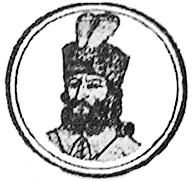
Stefan IX Tomsa

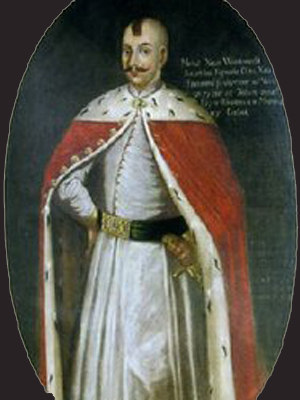
Michał Wiśniowiecki

== Battle of Iași ==
Soon after, in 1615, Korecki together with Michał Wiśniowiecki and Alexandru embarked on an armed expedition to the Moldavian capital of Iași where they smashed Tomsa's army. Twelve-year-old Alexandru took power in Moldavia. And soon after the victory, in order to consolidate the alliance, Korecki married Catherine Movila daughter of Ieremia Movilă.

== Battle of Cornul lui Sas ==
The change of power was opposed by the Ottoman Sultan Ahmed I who ordered his other subject, the Wallachian voivode Radu Mihnea, to remove Alexandru from the throne. Unluckily for Alexandru, his protector Michał Wiśniowiecki died, probably after being poisoned. Samuel Korecki was thus left alone, so he gathered an army in Poland and set out on another armed expedition to Moldavia. This time, however, Poland cut itself off from this expedition in order to avoid open conflict with the Ottoman Empire. The Turks expelled Alexandru from the capital and appointed Radu Mihnea in his place, the Turkish-Tatar forces defeated Korecki at the Battle of Cornul lui Sas, and Korecki himself was taken captive by them.

== Samuel Korecki's escape from Yedikule prison ==
Korecki was imprisoned in one of the toughest prisons of the Ottoman Empire located in Istanbul, Yedikule. The family and especially Samuel Korecki's brother tried to bail him out of prison, but the Turks were not going to let him go because they treated him as a fierce enemy of their interests. Help was found on the spot. Korecki lowered himself from the tower after a rope, finding refuge in the house of a Greek clergyman, where he waited out the search. After a few weeks, disguised as a monk and with a false passport, he reached Naples and then Rome. There he was granted an audience by pope Paul V. Then via Vienna, where the Emperor received him, he returned to his homeland in the spring of 1618.

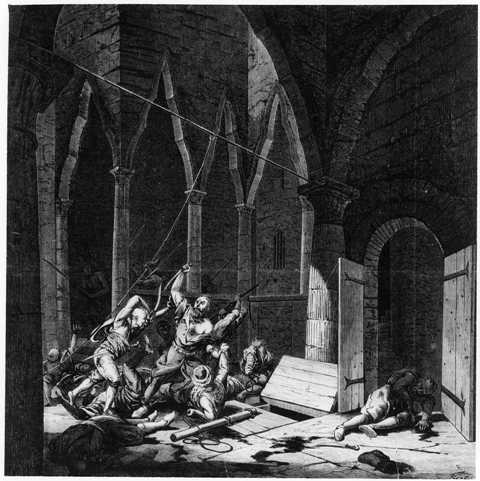
Murder of Samuel Korecki in Yedikule prison

The escape made Korecki's name famous in Europe, but it did not yet end the prince's Moldavian-Magnate adventures.

== Aftermath ==
In 1620 he accompanied Stanisław Zółkiewski on an expedition to Moldavia where he was again taken prisoner after the Battle of Cecora. In 1621, however, the Ottoman army suffered a severe defeat at the Battle of Khotyn. As part of the Treaty of Khotyn, the Ottomans agreed to release Polish prisoners who had been captured a year earlier. Samuel Korecki was too much of a threat to them, and the Turks could not afford to release him. Shortly after that, Polish envoy Krzysztof Zbaraski arrived in Istanbul to bail out Korecki from prison. So the Turks decided to get rid of Korecki in advance and most likely strangled him in prison. According to legends, before his death, Korecki managed to kill several attackers with his bare hands.

== See also ==
- Samuel Korecki
- Elisabeta Movilă
- Alexandru Movilă
- Ahmed I
- Moldavian Magnate Wars
- Moldavian-Polish Wars
- Polish-Ottoman Wars
