= Stefan Potocki's expedition to Moldavia =

- Part of Moldavian–Polish War; Polish–Ottoman Wars
Date	December 1607
Location	Moldavia
Result	Polish–Lithuanian victory: Mihail Movilă overthrown in favour of Constantin Movilă

Belligerents
Polish–Lithuanian Commonwealth	Moldavia; Crimean Khanate

Commanders and leaders
Stefan Potocki; Michał Wiśniowiecki	Mihail Movilă

Stefan Potocki's expedition to Moldavia in 1607 was a successful military intervention aimed at placing Constantin Movilă on the Moldavian throne, who was favorable to Stefan Potocki.

== Background ==
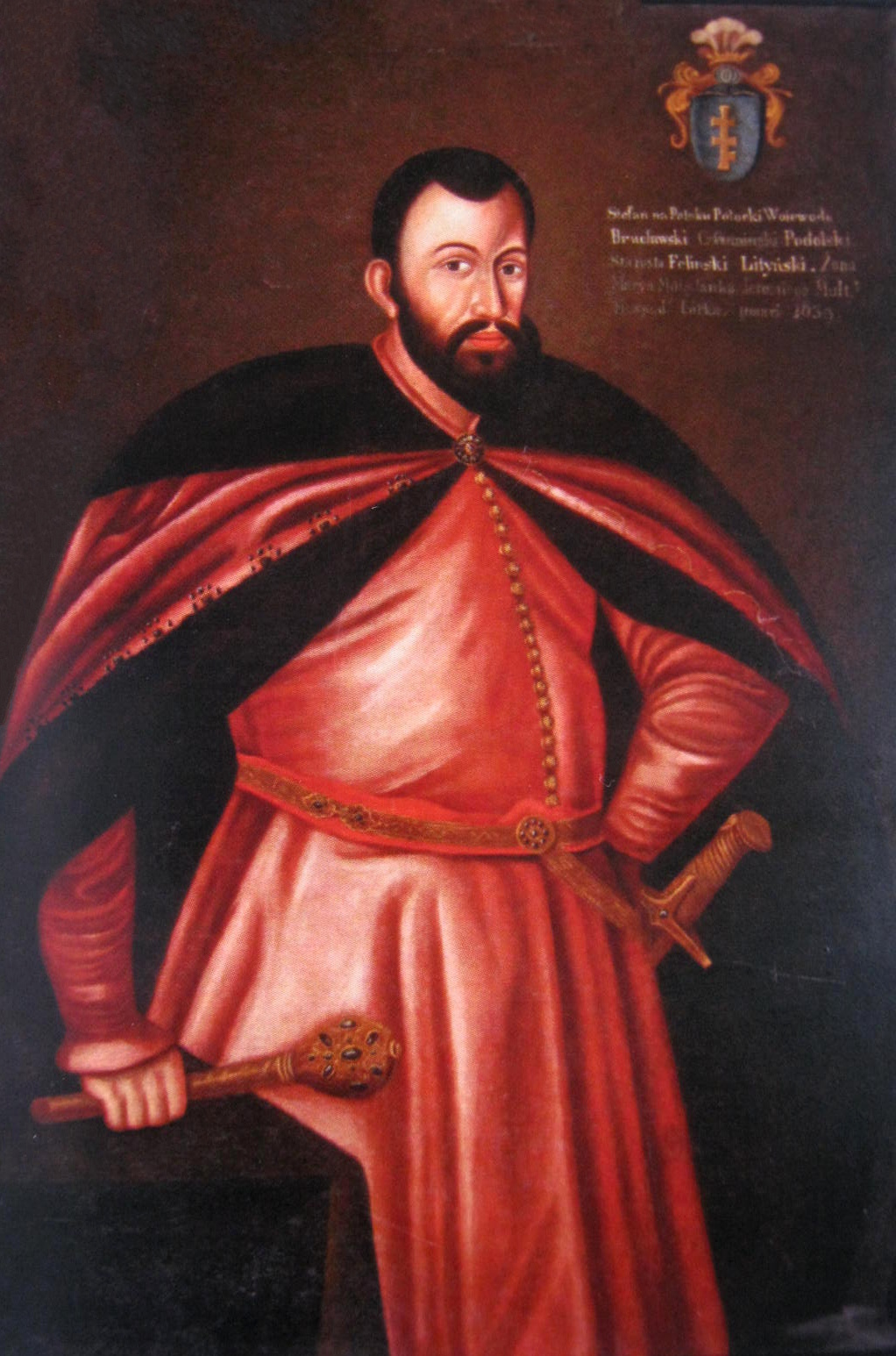
Stefan Potocki

The death of Ieremia Movila (July 10, 1606) was followed by a violent outbreak of power struggles in Moldavia. In violation of the rights of Ieremia's sons, the Moldavian throne was assumed by his brother, Simon. The Ottoman Empire argued such a move with the requests of the Moldavians and Ieremia's eldest son, Constantin Movila (he was only twelve years old at the time). This was protested by Ieremia's widow, Elisabeth, and her Polish sons-in-law – Prince Michał Wiśniowiecki, and Stefan Potocki. Simon Movila, having died on 24 September 1607, passed the hospodar throne to his son Michael. In such a situation, King Sigismund III Vasa granted Potocki and Michał Wiśniowiecki permission to intervene militarily in Moldavia to restore the throne to Constantin Movila. For the magnates themselves, a successful expedition allowed them to multiply their family fortunes through loot and contributions. In addition, Moldavia, lying at the intersection of important trade routes and allowing control of the Danube crossing and the land connection between the Crimean Khanate and the Turkish possessions, was an important area for economic and military reasons.

== Expedition to Moldavia ==
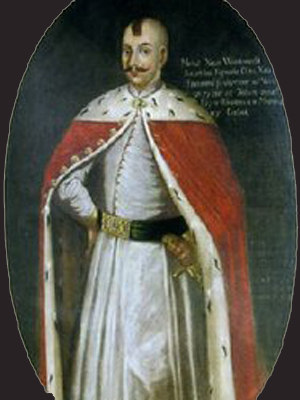
Michał Wiśniowiecki

Stefan Potocki, together with Prince Michael Wisniowiecki, his brothers and the hospodar, entered Moldova and defeated the Moldovan-Tatar troops at Stefanesti on 16 December 1607. Michael Movila had to flee the country, and his place was taken by Constantin Movila. Diplomatic efforts to have his reign approved by the Ottoman Empire began immediately, which was greatly facilitated by Michael's death. The approved hospodar, upon ascending to the throne in late 1607, began efforts to reduce the tribute paid to the Ottomans. The Sultan's court was offended by Constantine's submissiveness to the Poles, both magnates and soldiers remaining in his pay, but this was tolerated for a long time. At the time, the hospodar was only twelve years old, so most of the decisions that decided the fate of the state were the result of the rule of a group of boyars. It was they who were later held responsible for the overthrow of the prince.

== Aftermath ==
Constantin Movila, thanks to the support of Stefan Potocki, managed to hold onto the throne in Iași until 1611. However, he was then overthrown by the Prince of Transylvania, Gabriel Báthory.
