= Vădeni =

Vădeni or Vadeni may refer to:

- Vădeni, Brăila, a commune in Brăila County, Romania
- Vădeni, Soroca, a commune in Soroca District, Moldova
- Vădeni, a village in Cavadinești Commune, Galaţi County, Romania
- Vadeni (horse), a French racehorse
