= Battle of Sasowy Róg =

Battle of Sasowy Róg may refer to:

- Battle of Sasowy Róg (1612), in which Stefan Potocki was defeated by Ottomans and Moldavians
- Battle of Sasowy Róg (1616), in which Samuel Korecki was defeated by the Ottomans
- Battle of Sasowy Róg (1633), part of the Polish–Ottoman War of 1633–1634 in which the Polish-Lithuanian Commonwealth defeated Ottoman troops
