= Mohyła coat of arms =

Polish coat of arms

Mohyła
- Alternative name: Movilă
- Families: Mohyłowie (Movilești)

Mohyła is a Polish coat of arms. It was used by the Movilești family in the times of the Polish–Lithuanian Commonwealth.

== Notable bearers ==
Notable bearers of this coat of arms include:

- Mohyła family (Movilești)

== See also ==
- Polish heraldry
- Heraldry
- Coat of arms
- List of Polish nobility coats of arms

== Sources ==
- http://www.jarema.art.pl/M1.gif
- http://ebuw.uw.edu.pl/dlibra/doccontent?id=163
