= Paweł Potocki =

Polish nobleman

- Died: 1675
- Noble family: Potocki
- Issue: Teodor Andrzej Potocki
- Father: Stefan Potocki, voivode of Bratslav

Paweł Potocki (d. 1675) was a Polish nobleman and writer. He was born into the prominent Potocki family through his father, Stefan Potocki. From 1638 to 1642, he studied at the Kraków Academy and the University of Padua. By 1643, he was a royal court secretary. In the mid-1650s, Paweł was captured by Russian troops and held captive in Russia for more than a decade. During his captivity, he allegedly swore allegiance to the tsar, married a Russian noblewoman, and learned material for his later work on Russian society. Stefan, Paweł's father, had previously also spent some years in foreign captivity at the prison in Istanbul.

Paweł wrote several works during his lifetime. His style heavily relied on allusion, with the posthumously edited version of Moschovia opening with phrases such as "aurum abire in ferrum, sanguine pluere caelum". Like his father, Paweł supported the Dominican Order, and this devotion was evident in the sacral nature of Sanctitas. Paweł's son was archbishop Teodor Potocki.

Historian Mirosław Nagielski authored Paweł Potocki's biography for the Polish Biographical Dictionary.

== Works ==
- Moschovia sive brevis narratio de moribus magnae Russorum monarchiae, 1670.
- Saeculum bellatorum et togatorum seu centuria elogiorum clarissimorum virorum Polonorum et Lithuanorum, 1702.
- Sanctitas peregrina sive oratio in laudem divi Hyacinthi Regni Poloniae patroni, Rome, 1643.

== See also ==
- Baroque Polish literature
