= Alexandru Movilă =

Moldovan noblemen (1601-1620)

Prince of Moldavia
- Reign: 22 November 1615 – 2 August 1616
- Predecessor: Ștefan IX Tomșa
- Successor: Radu Mihnea
- Born: 1601
- Died: 1620 (aged 18–19); Istanbul
- Dynasty: Movilești
- Father: Ieremia Movilă
- Mother: Elisabeta Movilă
- Religion: Orthodox

Alexandru Movilă (1601 – 1620) was Prince of Moldavia from 1615 to 1616.

== Life ==
The second son of Ieremia Movilă and his wife Erszébet Csomortany de Losoncz, he is taken to the throne by his mother after the death of his elder brother Constantin Movilă.

Supported by Poland he succeeded to establish himself as prince of Moldova on November 22, 1615 in the place of Ștefan II Tomșa. His troops were however defeated by the Turks and he was taken prisoner on August 2, 1616 with his younger brother Bogdan. They are sent to Constantinople, where they convert to Islam and disappear from history. Their mother who took part in the campaign at the head of the army, is captured at the same time as them. Attributed as a concubine to an Ağa she is locked in a harem, where she dies around 1620.

== Sources ==
- Alexandru Dimitrie Xenopol Histoire des Roumains de la Dacie trajane : Depuis les origines jusqu'à l'union des principautés. E Leroux Paris (1896)
- Nicolae Iorga Histoire des Roumains et de la romanité orientale. (1920)
- (in Romanian) Constantin C. Giurescu & Dinu C. Giurescu, Istoria Românilor Volume III (depuis 1606), Editura Științifică și Enciclopedică, Bucarest, 1977.
- Jean Nouzille La Moldavie, Histoire tragique d'une région européenne, Ed. Bieler, ISBN 2-9520012-1-9.
- Gilles Veinstein, Les Ottomans et la mort (1996) ISBN 9004105050.
- Joëlle Dalegre Grecs et Ottomans 1453-1923. De la chute de Constantinople à la fin de l’Empire Ottoman, L’Harmattan Paris (2002) ISBN 2747521621.

Preceded by Ștefan IX Tomșa	Prince of Moldavia; 1615–1616	Succeeded by Radu Mihnea
