= Stefan Potocki, voivode of Bratslav =

Polish nobleman (1568–1631)

Stefan Potocki
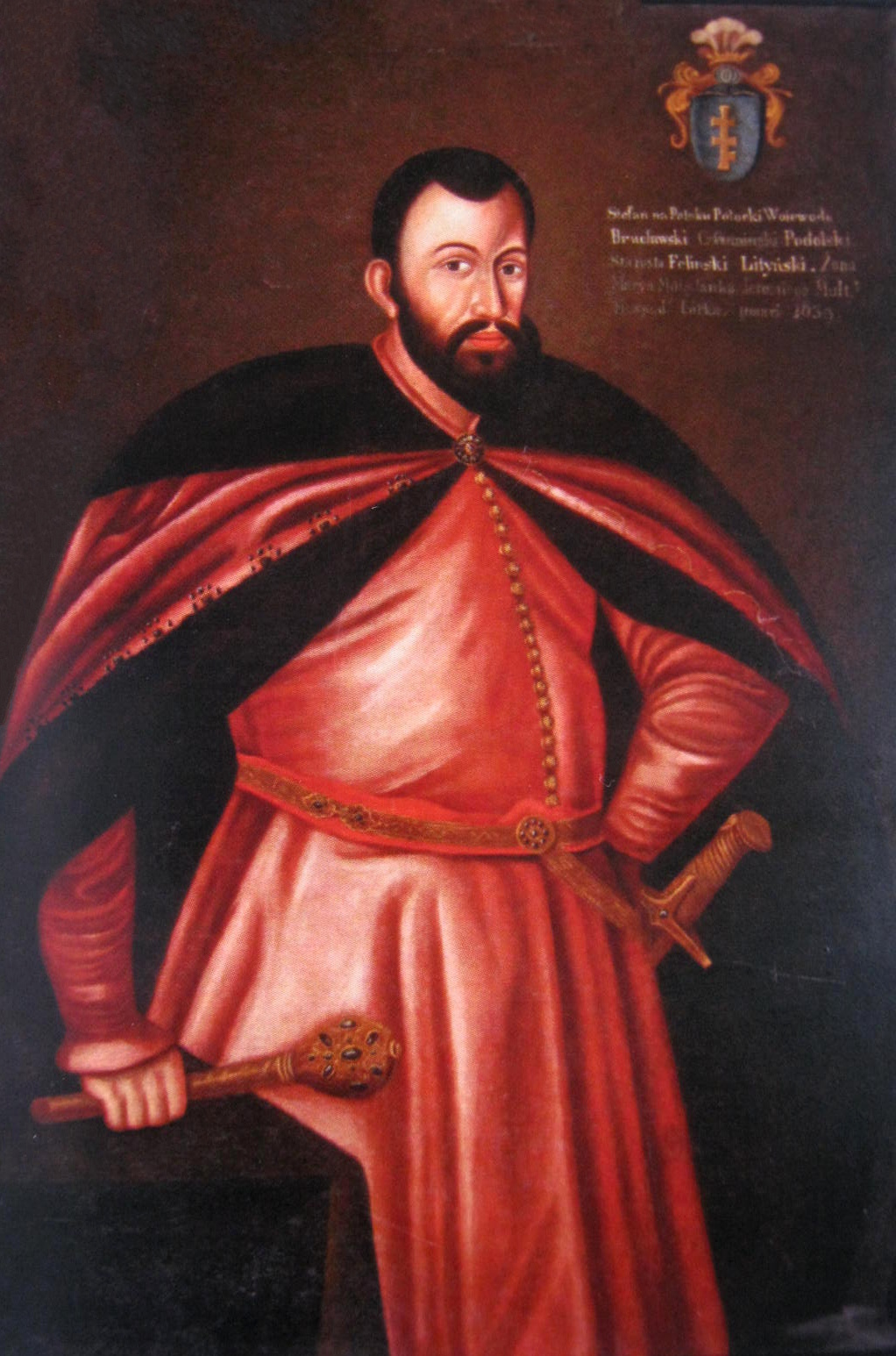
- Born: 1568
- Died: 1631 (aged 62–63)
- Noble family: Potocki
- Issue: Piotr, Paweł

Stefan Potocki (1568 – 1631) was a Polish nobleman and military commander who was palatine of Bratslav. He was also starost of Felin and Kamieniec.

Stefan, son of Mikołaj, was born into the prominent Potocki family. In February 1606, he married Maria, the daughter of Ieremia Movilă. In 1607, he campaigned in Moldavia to successfully place Maria's brother, Constantin Movilă, on the Moldavian throne. From 1609 to 1611, he campaigned during the Polish–Swedish War and Polish–Russian War. In 1612, he again entered Moldavia to support Constantin, but Stefan was captured by the Ottomans during the Battle of Cornul lui Sas. He was imprisoned in the Yedikule Fortress until 1615, and his supporters had to pay a ransom of 300,000 ducats for his release. The issue of Stefan's capture even reached Sigismund III, who requested Emperor Matthias' diplomatic assistance with the release.

Stefan was a convert from Calvinism to Catholicism. He founded a Dominican convent and church in Potok Złoty where he was later buried. As the owner of Buczacz, he also led the development of fortifications in that town.

Stefan is the father of writer Paweł Potocki. Stefan is also the grandfather of archbishop Teodor Andrzej Potocki.

== See also ==
- Moldavian Magnate Wars
