= Gabriel Movilă =

Prince of Wallachia (1st reign)
- Reign: August – September 1616
- Predecessor: Radu Mihnea
- Successor: Alexandru Iliaş

Prince of Wallachia (2nd reign)
- Reign: June 1618 – July 1620
- Predecessor: Alexandru Iliaş
- Successor: Radu Mihnea
- Born: unknown
- Died: December 1635
- House: Movileşti
- Father: Simion Movilă
- Religion: Orthodox

Gabriel or Gavril Movilă (? – December 1635) was Prince of Wallachia from June 1618 to July 1620. A Movileşti boyar, Gabriel was a son of Simion Movilă, Prince of Moldavia.

== Biography ==
He attained the throne of Wallachia in 1616 but he remained unrecognized by the Ottoman government, which preferred Alexandru IV Iliaş. He obtained his appointment in June 1618 but was replaced in July 1620 by Radu IX Mihnea.

He retired to Transylvania where he died. He had married a Hungarian noblewoman Erzébet Zolyomy. The couple probably remained childless.

== Bibliography ==
- Brown, Amelia Robertson; Neil, Bronwen, eds. (20 July 2017). Byzantine Culture in Translation. BRILL. ISBN 9789004349070.
- Roggema, Barbara, ed. (23 October 2017). Christian-Muslim Relations. A Bibliographical History. Volume 10 Ottoman and Safavid Empires (1600-1700). Brill. ISBN 9789004346048.
- Suciu, I. D. (1980). Unitatea poporului român: contribuții istorice bănățene (in Romanian). Facla.

| Preceded by Radu Mihnea | Prince of Wallachia; 1616 | Succeeded by Alexandru Iliaş |
| Preceded by Alexandru Iliaş | Prince of Wallachia; 1618–1620 | Succeeded by Radu Mihnea |
