= Mihail Movilă =

Prince of Moldavia during 1607

Prince of Moldavia (1st reign)
- Reign: 24 September – October 1607
- Predecessor: Simion Movilă
- Successor: Constantin Movilă

Prince of Moldavia (2nd reign)
- Reign: November – December 1607
- Predecessor: Constantin Movilă
- Successor: Constantin Movilă
- Born: unknown
- Died: 1608; Wallachia
- Dynasty: Movilești
- Father: Simion Movilă
- Mother: Marghita
- Religion: Orthodox

Mihail Movilă (? – 1608) was the prince of Moldavia for a short time in 1607.

== Life ==
He was the elder son of Simion I Movilă and became prince of Moldova after the death of his father in September 1607.

He was thrown from the throne the following month by his cousin Constantin Movilă, pushed by his mother, the ambitious Erzsébet Csomortany de Losoncz, widow of Prince Ieremia Movilă.

He tried to regain his throne in November 1607 but was forced into exile the following month in the court of Radu Șerban in Wallachia, where he eventually died.

== Sources ==
- Alexandru Dimitrie Xenopol Histoire des Roumains de la Dacie trajane : Depuis les origines jusqu'à l'union des principautés. E Leroux Paris (1896)
- Nicolas Iorga Histoire des Roumains et de la romanité orientale. (1920)
- (in Romanian) Constantin C. Giurescu & Dinu C. Giurescu, Istoria Românilor Volume III (après 1606), Editura Ştiinţifică şi Enciclopedică, București, 1977.
- Jean Nouzille La Moldavie, Histoire tragique d'une région européenne, Ed. Bieler, ISBN 2-9520012-1-9.
- Kolodziejczyk, Dariusz (22 June 2011). The Crimean Khanate and Poland-Lithuania: International Diplomacy on the European Periphery (15th-18th Century). A Study of Peace Treaties Followed by Annotated Documents. ISBN 978-9004191907.
- Alexandru Ioan Cuza university (2009). Medieval and Early Modern for Central and Eastern Europe. Al I Cuza University Press.

Preceded by Simion Movilă	Prince of Moldavia; September – October 1607	Succeeded by Constantin Movilă
Preceded by Constantin Movilă	Prince of Moldavia; November – December 1607	Succeeded by Constantin Movilă
