= Battle of Cornul lui Sas =

1612 battle

- Part of Moldavian Magnate Wars
Date	9 July 1612
Location	Popricani, Iași County 47°18′17″N 27°33′22″E
Result	Ottoman–Moldavian–Tatar victory

Belligerents
Moldavia; Ottoman Empire; Crimean Khanate	Polish–Lithuanian Commonwealth; Moldavian opposition

Commanders and leaders
Ștefan IX Tomșa; Khan Temir	Stefan Potocki (POW); Stanisław Żółkiewski; Constantin Movilă (POW)

Strength
Unknown	Unknown

Casualties and losses
Unknown	Unknown

The Battle of Cornul lui Sas took place on 9 July 1612 between the forces of Ștefan IX Tomșa, the ruler of Moldavia, (supported by the Ottoman Empire) and the Budjak Horde led by Khan Temir (spelled Cantemir-bey by Romanian chroniclers)), and a private army assembled by Stefan Potocki, voivode of Bratslav in the (Polish–Lithuanian Commonwealth in order to reinstall his brother in law Constantin Movilă as Moldavian ruler. By tacking this stance, Potocki openly defied the king's order to avoid any conflict with Ottomans. The battle resulted in a clear defeat of the Potocki's army. Both Stefan Potocki and Constantin Movilă's mother, Elisabeta Movilă were captured by Ottomans.

The former voivode of Moldavia Constantin Movilă was taken prisoner by the Tatars, with the intent to ransom him, but he drowned while they were crossing the Dniester.

This battle was an episode of Moldavian Magnate Wars.

This battle forms the topic of the first chapter in Mihail Sadoveanu's historical novel Neamul Șoimăreștilor (The Șoimărești Family).
