= Turkish invasion =

Turkish invasion may refer to:

- invasions by Turkey:
  - 1920 Turkish invasion of Armenia
  - 1921 Turkish invasion of Georgia
  - 1974 Turkish invasion of Cyprus
  - 2019 Turkish offensive into north-eastern Syria

== See also ==
- Military history of Turkey
- Military history of the Ottoman Empire
- Seljuk invasion of Anatolia, from 1071
