= Ștefan Tomșa =

Ruler of Moldavia in 1563 and 1564 (died 1564)

Prince of Moldavia
- Reign: August 1563 – March 1564
- Predecessor: Iacob Heraclid
- Successor: Alexandru Lăpușneanu
- Born: unknown
- Died: 5 May 1564; Lviv
- Issue: Ștefan IX Tomșa, Leon Tomșa
- Dynasty: Bogdan-Mușat
- Religion: Orthodox

Ștefan Tomșa or Ștefan VII (Polish: Stefan VII Tomża; died 5 May 1564) was the ruler of Moldavia in 1563 and 1564.

== Biography ==
Tomșa served as hatman and came to power as leader of a boyar revolt against the Lutheran Ioan Iacob Heraclid, whose attempts to impose the new usages in Moldavia offended the Eastern Orthodox sensibilities of nobles. Ioan Iacob, better known in Romanian history as Despot Vodă, sought refuge in the city of Suceava.

While a part of his force was besieging Suceava, Tomșa defeated the Polish-Cossack-Tatar forces of the pretender Dmytro Vyshnevetsky at Vercicani in late August or early September 1563, ending Vyshnevetsky's campaign in disaster.

Ștefan Tomșa was claimed the ruler of Moldavia on 8 August 1563. Suceava fell to Ştefan Tomșa's forces in October 1563, and the new ruler killed his predecessor with a mace.

Ștefan Tomșa defeated an invasion by the neighbouring Wallachian prince Petru cel Tânăr, but was unable to obtain recognition by the Ottoman Empire as ruler of Wallachia. Alexandru Lăpușneanu, who had been deposed by Ioan Iacob in 1561, was returned to power with Ottoman assistance in January 1564, and Ștefan Tomșa fled to neighbouring Poland.

Tomșa was imprisoned with his boyars in Buczacz. On the request of the Sultan boyars were sent to Turkey. The Sultan wanted also Ștefan Tomșa. Tomșa on the request of the Polish King Sigismund II Augustus was sentenced to death and beheaded in Lwów on 5 May 1564. He was buried in Lwów.

His sons were later rulers of the principalities, Ștefan IX Tomșa in Moldavia, and Leon Tomșa in Wallachia.

== Footnotes ==
Preceded by Ioan Iacob Heraclid	Ruler of Moldavia; August 1563 – March 1564	Succeeded by Alexandru Lăpușneanu second reign
