= Radu Șerban =

Prince of Wallachia (died 1620)

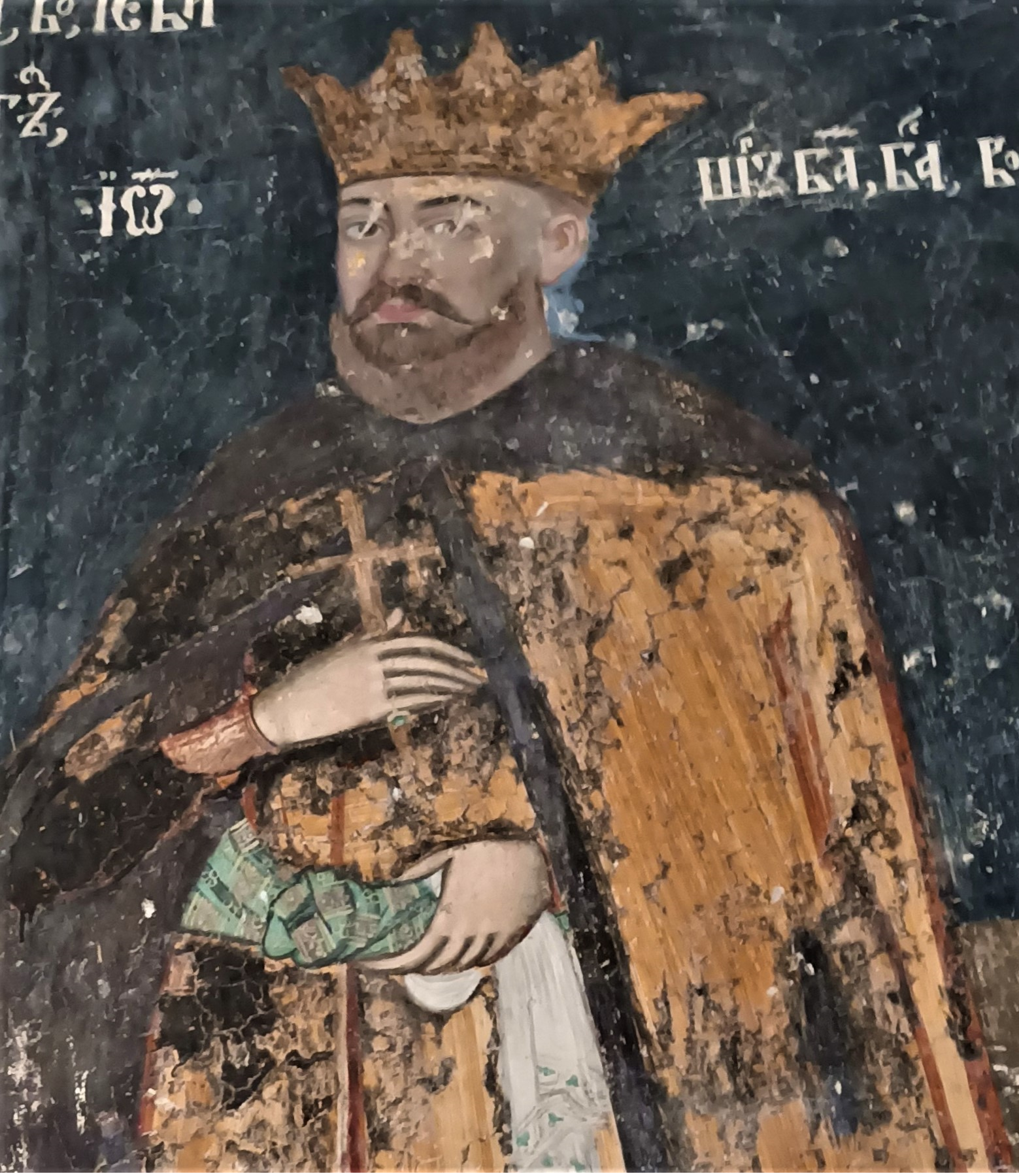
- Painting of Șerban at Târgoviște Princely Court

Prince of Wallachia (1st reign)
- Reign: August 1602 – December 1610
- Predecessor: Simion Movilă
- Successor: Radu Mihnea

Prince of Wallachia (2nd reign)
- Reign: June – September 1611
- Predecessor: Radu Mihnea
- Successor: Radu Mihnea
- Born: c. 1560's
- Died: 13 March 1620
- Issue: Constantin Șerban
- House: Basarab
- Religion: Orthodox

Radu Șerban (c. 1560's – 13 March 1620) was a Wallachian nobleman who reigned as the principality's voivode during two periods from 1602 to 1610 and during 1611.

== Biography ==
A supposed descendant of Neagoe Basarab, Șerban attained high office during the reign of Michael the Brave. After ascending the throne, he continued the policy of independence of Wallachia first put forth by Michael the Brave. Having struggled with great difficulties inside and outside the country, he managed to cope successfully during a reign which lasted almost ten years. He successfully defeated Simion Movilă and the Polish–Lithuanian Commonwealth and stopped Gabriel Bathory and Giorgio Basta from advancing into Wallachia. He has been noted for his particular political skill and military prowess, proving to be one of the more noteworthy princes of Wallachia.

== Life and Rule ==
After the assassination of Michael the Brave and the short reign of the Moldavian Simion Movilă, Radu Șerban ascended the throne of Wallachia in October 1601, with the support of the great boyars Preda, Stroe and Radu Buzescu, to whom he was uncle on his mother's side. Buzescu enjoyed great political and military authority and consistently constantly supported Șerban's reign.

The first year of his reign was difficult. Radu Șerban first had to fight with the former lord, Simion Movilă. Eventually Movilă was abandoned by the Polish armies sent by Jan Zamoyski (the great chancellor of the crown) and was forced to retreat to Moldavia along with Radu Mihnea, the pretender to the throne supported by the Turks.

Emblem of Wallachia under Radu Serban

A skilled commander of troops, Radu Șerban continued Michael the Brave's policy of liberating the country from the Turks and approaching the Habsburg Empire. He fought battles with the Turks, Tatars, Hungarian princes from Transylvania, Moses Székely and Gabriel Bathory, who were supported by the Ottoman Porte.

In the autumn of 1602, Simion Movilă attempted to regain the throne of Wallachia. To this end, he addressed the Tatars of the Crimean Khanate as, "worse friends than the worst enemy" (as Nicolae Iorga characterized them), promising that he would allow the Tatars to plunder freely in the country if they would help him occupy the Wallachian throne. On 13 September, Simion Movilă and 40,000 Tatars (under the command of the khan Gazi Ghirai), the Moldavians sent by his brother Ieremia Movilă, and about 300 Cossacks entered Wallachia.

Radu Șerban's army was much smaller, numbering about 8,000–10,000 infantry and 6,000 cavalry. An additional 1,000 cavalry were later added from Transylvania by the Habsburg general Giorgio Basta. Given the size of the invading army, Radu Șerban adopted a defensive tactic. The decisive battle was fought at Teișani, in the Teleajen River valley, on 23 and 24 September 1602. The Romanian camp was fortified with trenches and palisades, and all Tatar attacks against the Romanian camp failed. After suffering heavy losses, the Tatars were forced to retreat to Silistra. They retreated across the Danube, being expected as aid for the campaign the Turks were to carry out in Hungary.

During the Battle of Teișani, a notable event occurred: the son-in-law (and nephew) of the Khan Gazi Ghirai approached the front of the Tatar lines, challenging the leaders of the Wallachian army to a single combat. The challenge was accepted by Stroe Buzescu. After a fierce battle Buzescu defeated the Tatar by beheading him in front of the Khan, much to the enthusiasm of the Wallachian army. Stroe Buzescu was also seriously wounded in the combat and died a few days later, on 2 October. His tombstone, from the Stănești hermitage (in Stănești-Lunca, Vâlcea County), has been preserved to this day. On the tombstone, his wife, the lady Sima, had an inscription carved in Romanian about her husband's Christian and brave deeds, ending with: "And he was not in the presence of the Tatar dogs."

In the summer of 1603, Radu Șerban intervened in Transylvania against the coalition of Hungarian magnates led by Moses Székely. The magnates were trying to drive the Habsburgs out of Transylvania. The primary reason for Șerban's intervention was not an alliance with the Habsburg Empire. Rather, it was primarily the awareness that an anti-Ottoman struggle was occurring in the south of the Carpathians, and it would be unacceptable for the pro-Turkish powers of Moses Székely and his Hungarian nobles supporters to establish themselves in Transylvania. Radu Șerban could not accept the capture of Wallachia in a "pincer" by the Ottoman Empire south of the Danube and a Transylvania subject to them. The vanguard of the Wallachian armies, commanded by the captains Gyorgy Racz and Vasile Mârza, crossed the mountains on the Teleajen Valley and set up camp near Brașov (a Saxon fortress that had remained loyal to the Habsburgs). They first camped at Feldioara, then at Râșnov, awaiting the main forces. The voivode, with the bulk of his army, crossed the Carpathians through the Rucăr-Bran pass, joining up with the vanguard led by Gyorgy Racz.

Moses Székely also arrived with his army (4,000 Hungarians, 2,000 Tatars and 25 light cannons) near Brașov. Székely felt he had no chance of success in an open field battle, and adopted a defensive tactic, fortifying himself near Râșnov in a surrounded camp, using wagons connected to each other as a defense. The battle occurred on the morning of July 17 (historians call it the First Battle of Brașov - 1603): the impetuous attack of the Wallachians managed to break the defenses of the Hungarians and forced them to retreat. Radu Șerban's cavalry pursued the fugitives, wreaking havoc among their ranks; Moses Székely himself was killed while trying to escape. The imperial general Giorgio Basta, who was at Satu Mare, feared that Radu Șerban would take possession of all of Transylvania, just like Michael the Brave. However, the Wallachian voivode was content with this victory (which secured his northern flank), and retreated to Wallachia. Several years of peace and relative tranquility followed for the country. With the northern border secured and the threat of Tatar invasions repelled, Radu Șerban managed to establish a "modus vivendi" with the Turks, who had other political and military problems at the time, thus securing the southern border of Wallachia. After consolidating his rule, Radu Șerban preferred Târgoviște as his seat (to be more protected from a possible Turkish invasion), but did not neglect Bucharest either. There he built the Șerban Vodă pond, which can be found today in Carol I Park. Remarkably for that era, the voivode sought to support the country's economic development by taking measures to settle debts between individuals and compensate for "plunders and thefts and robberies" (a confirmation of these measures being found in a charter issued by Matei Basarab on June 12, 1636).

In 1610, there were troubling signs that the new prince of Transylvania, Gabriel Bathory, intended to take aggressive action against his neighbors across the Carpathians, Moldavia and Wallachia. Meanwhile, Radu Șerban had established friendly relations with the new ruler of Moldavia, Constantin Movilă. On 20 December 1610, Gabriel Bathory's mercenaries, after plundering Țara Bârsei for five days, crossed the snowy Carpathians and entered Wallachia by surprise. An unprepared Radu Șerban was forced to leave Târgoviște and take refuge in Moldavia, with his friend Constantin Movilă. For three months, Gabriel Bathory's armies ruthlessly plundered Wallachia; including churches and monasteries being plundered of their sacred relics and lead roofs (melted for casting bullets), and graves desecrated.

Meanwhile, Radu Șerban was trying to gather his troops in his camp at Roman and renewed the treaty of alliance with the Habsburg Empire. In early June 1611, he returned to Wallachia and gathered with him the army of the country, the boyars, who were "thirsty for revenge against Gabor [Gabriel Bathory] for the many evils he had done to Wallachia", as a chronicler of the time wrote. In July, Radu Șerban, with his entire army, crossed the Carpathians, surprising Gabriel Bathory in the camp at Prejmer (near Brașov), where he had fortified himself with his main forces. Gabriel Bathory tried to retreat towards Brașov, but Radu Șerban, in spite of his troops being tired from an exhausting march over the mountains, refused to let him go. Radu Șerban attacked on July 9 on the plain between Brașov and the village of Sânpetru. This battle is known by historians as The Second Battle of Brașov - 1611. The Wallachians and Polish cuirassier riders (hired as mercenaries by Radu Șerban) crushed the Transylvanian army, and Gabriel Bathory fled from the battlefield. The numerous mentions in the chronicles, letters and chancellery documents of the time are evidence that contemporaries of the time regarded this as a brilliant victory. The Habsburgs' satisfaction at seeing a formidable enemy defeated was somewhat overshadowed by the fear that Radu Șerban would follow in the footsteps of Michael the Brave and conquer all of Transylvania. However, Radu Șerban understood that the overall situation was no longer favorable for attempting to unite the Danubian principalities into a state capable of successfully opposing the Ottomans, as Michael the Brave had attempted.

The Ottoman Empire did not accept the expulsion of its protégé, Gabriel Bathory, from the Transylvanian throne. A large Turkish army, reinforced with a Tatar horde, invaded Wallachia. Radu Șerban returned from Transylvania, but was forced to retreat to Moldavia, pursued by the Turks and Tatars. His remaining army was attacked by his pursuers in a forest near Bacău, on September 30, 1611. In this clash, Radu Șerban lost his cannons and supply wagons, bogged down in mud caused by autumn rains. He also lost his best soldiers, including the Polish cuirassier cavalry, who sacrificed themselves to ensure the withdrawal of the main forces. Radu Șerban went to Suceava, where he took his family, and set off on the wandering path to Vienna.

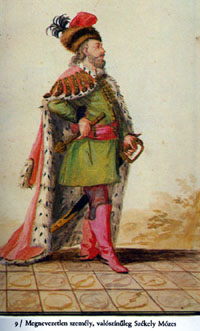
Moses Szekely

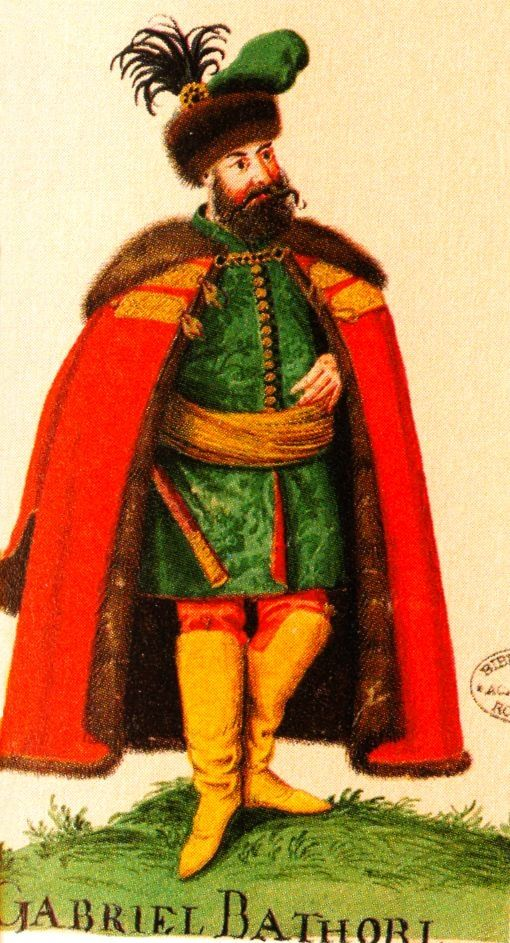
Gabriel Bathori

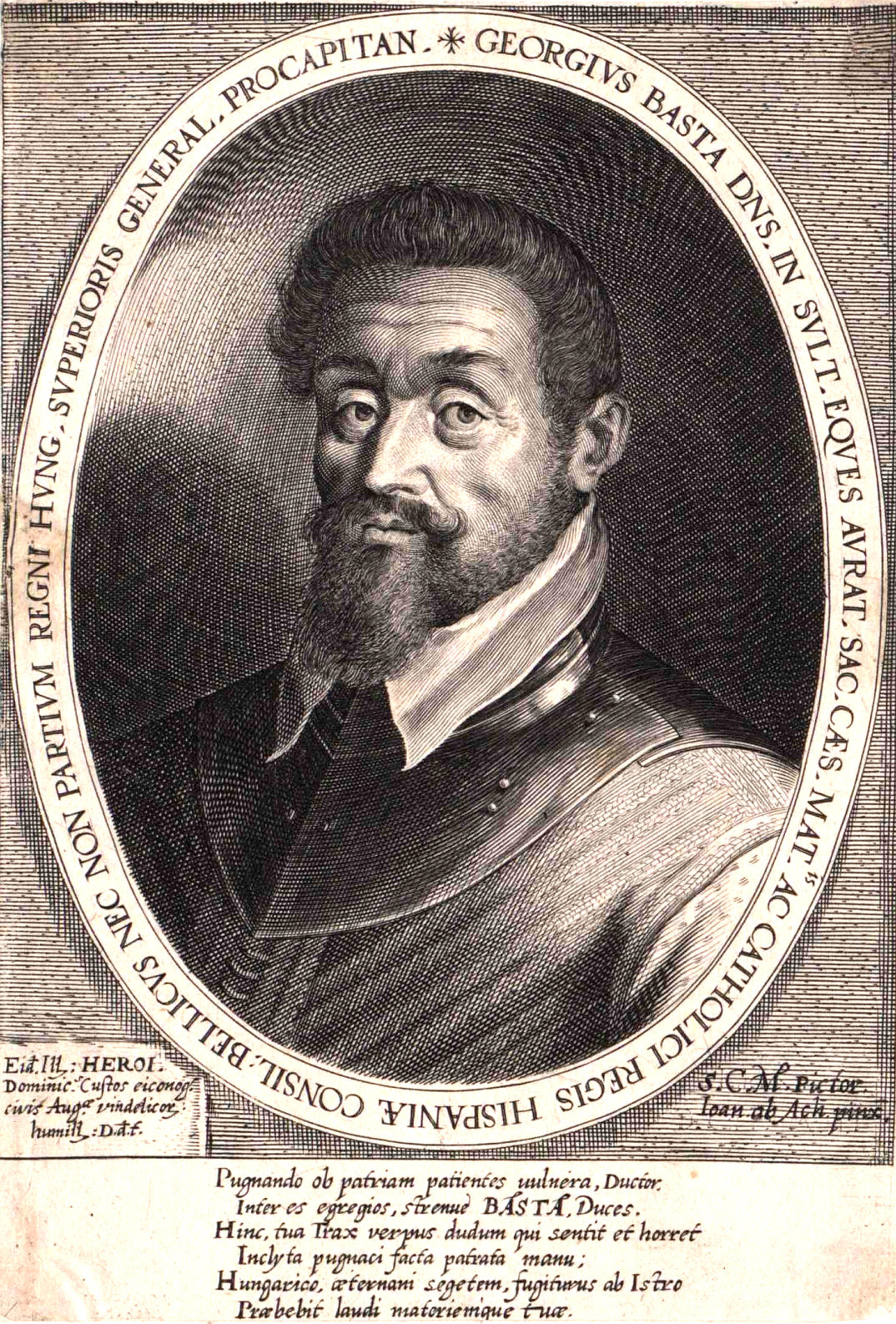
Giorgio Basta

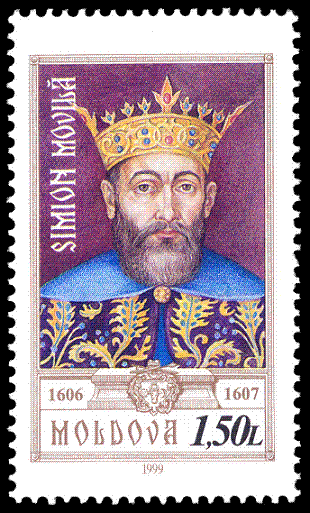
Simion Movila

== Battle of Brașov ==
In the summer of 1603, Radu Șerban intervened in Transylvania against the coalition of Hungarian magnates, led by Moses Székely, who were trying to drive the Habsburgs out of Transylvania. The main reason for this intervention was not so much the alliance he had concluded with the Habsburg Empire, but the awareness that it was unacceptable that, while an anti-Ottoman struggle was going on south of the Carpathians, the pro-Turkish power of Moses Székely and the Hungarian nobles who supported him could be established in Transylvania. "Radu Șerban could not accept the capture of Wallachia in a pincer by the Ottoman Empire south of the Danube and a Transylvania subject to them."

The Wallachian army, led by Radu Șerban, crossed the mountains through the Rucăr-Bran Pass and joined the vanguard of Gyorgy Racz and Vasile Mârza, established near Brașov. The opponent, Moses Székely, supported by Hungarian and Tatar troops, barricaded himself near Râșnov. On July 17, 1603, the Wallachians attacked decisively, crushing Székely's army, who was killed in battle. The victory ensured Radu Șerban control of the area and the security of the northern border, although he did not occupy Transylvania, preferring to retreat to Wallachia.

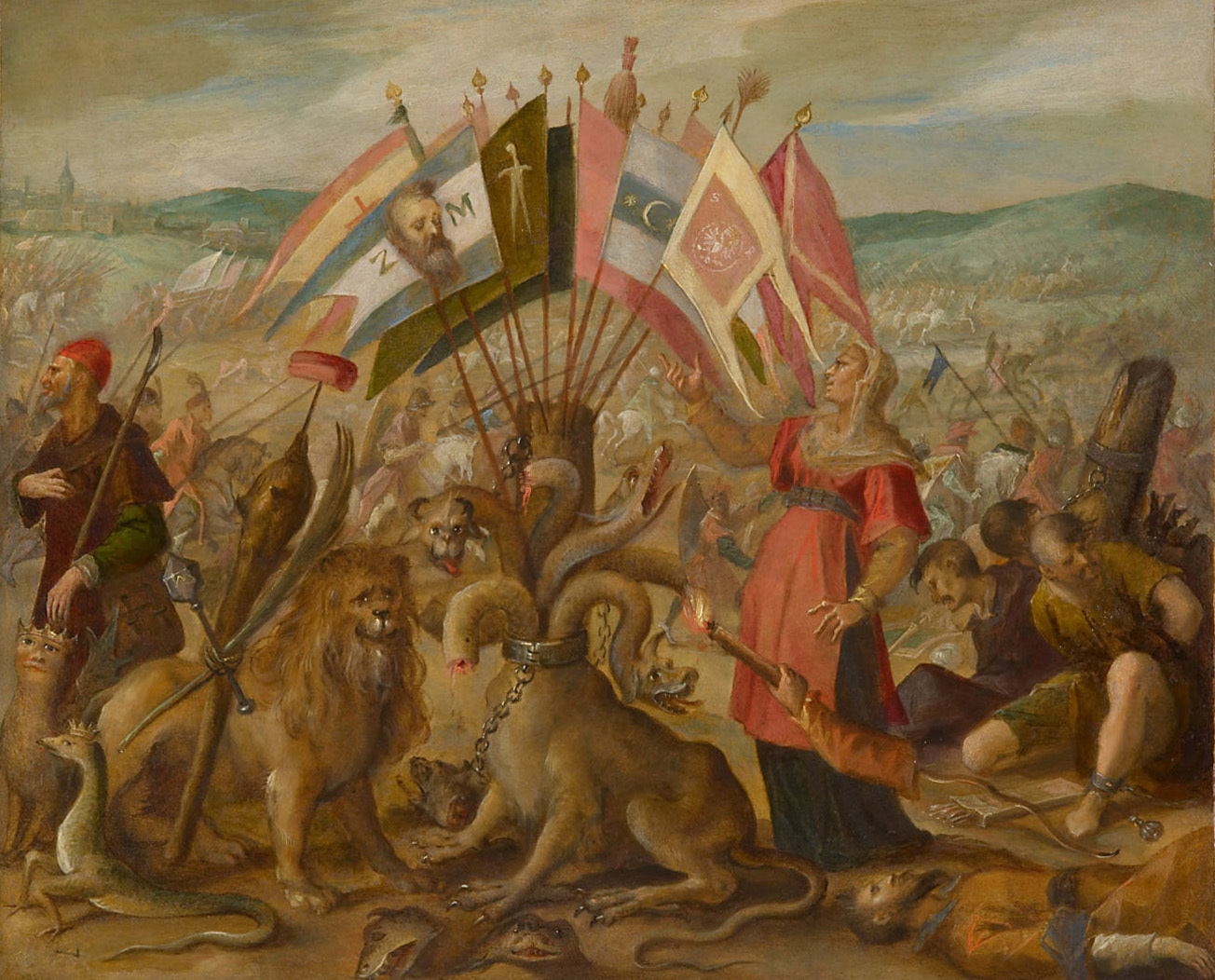
Battle of Kronstadt

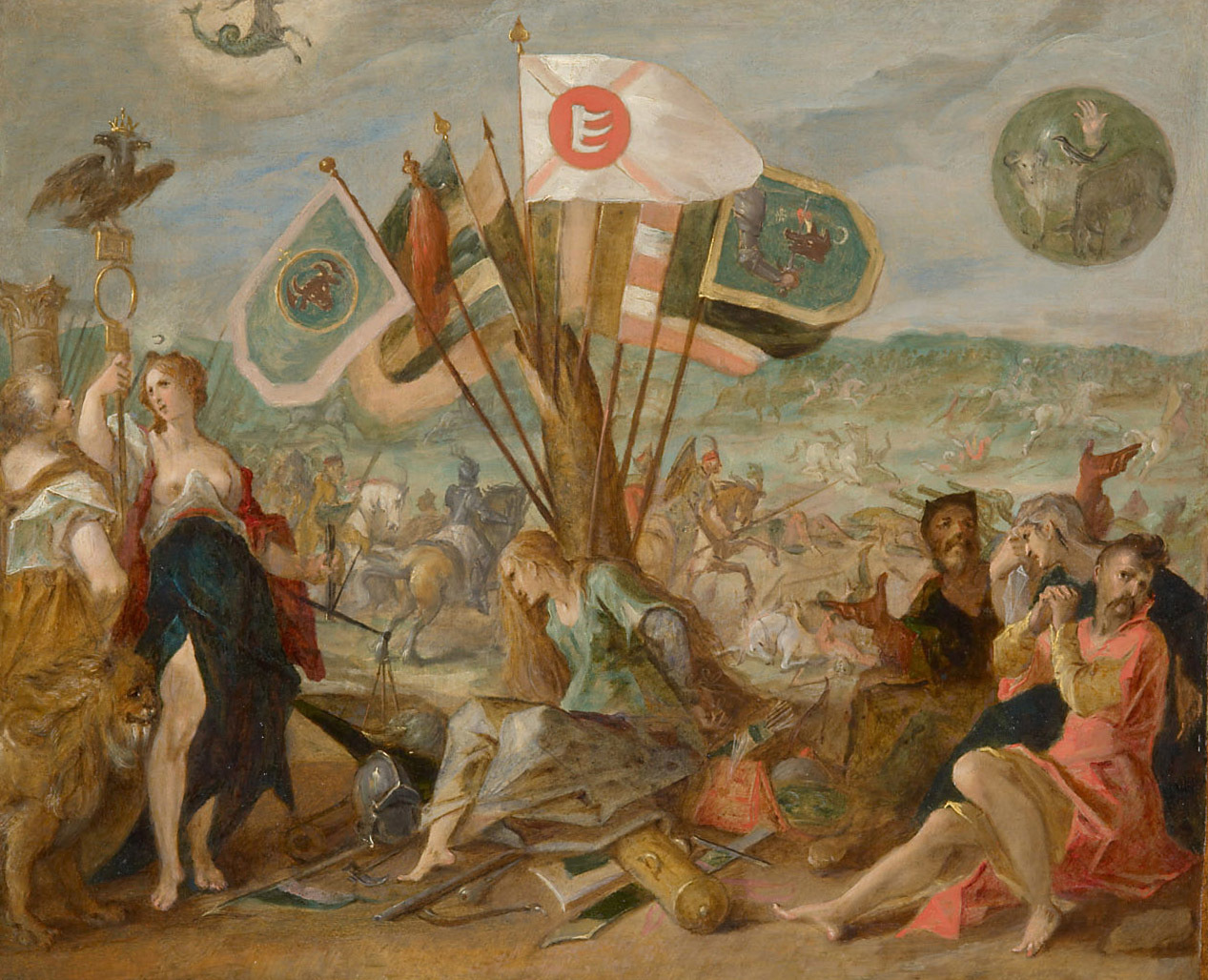
Battle of Hermannstadt

== The Second Battle of Brașov ==
In 1604, Radu Șerban concluded peace with the Ottoman Empire, setting the tribute at 32,000 gold coins. However, danger came from the north: the Transylvanian prince Gabriel Báthory sought to extend his influence over Wallachia and Moldavia. Although they had signed a treaty in 1608, Báthory invaded Wallachia in early 1611, occupying Târgoviște. Radu Șerban took refuge in Moldavia, at the court of Constantin Movilă. As Báthory was not recognized by the Porte, the sultan appointed Radu Mihnea in his place, to restore Ottoman control over the country.

In June 1611, Radu Șerban returned to Wallachia with Moldavian support, driving out Radu Mihnea. With an army of about 8,000–11,000 men, he crossed the mountains to Brașov, where he faced the twice-larger forces of Prince Gabriel Báthory. The battle, fought on 29 June 1611 (of St. Peter), was fierce: the Wallachian troops, decisively supported by the Polish hussars, achieved victory, causing heavy losses to the Transylvanians (approx. 10,000 dead and 120 flags captured). However, in his absence, the Ottomans reinstated Radu Mihnea on the throne, and Radu Șerban took refuge first in Moldavia, then in the Habsburg Empire, where he died in 1620.

“The Poles noticed that the Wallachians were in trouble and immediately came to their aid, so that Báthory was terribly frightened and fled to the side” — Mihai Seybriger

“And he fought a great battle on St. Peter's Day and defeated his enemy, Bátor Gabor, and many bodies were cut down by his army, making a large mound of them in the Brașov meadow” — The Chronicle of Wallachia

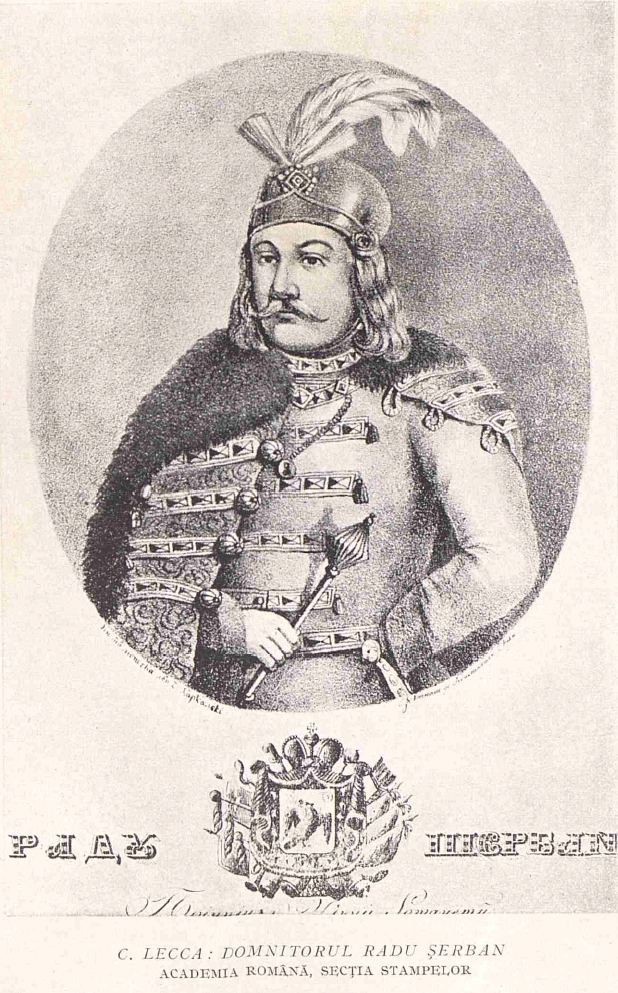
Radu Serban by Constantin Lecca

== The Wanderings and the End ==
After the defeat in 1611, Radu Șerban sought support from the Habsburg Empire to regain his throne, but Vienna offered him only promises, fearing a conflict with the Ottoman Empire. Sick of gout and exhausted by military life, he died in Vienna on 13 March 1620, at the age of almost 60. As a sign of respect, Emperor Ferdinand II ordered that the ruler be buried in St. Stephen's Cathedral, a place reserved for the imperial family. In 1640, his daughter Ancuța brought the remains of Radu Șerban and her husband, Nicolae Pătrașcu (son of Michael the Brave), to the Comana Monastery, where they were placed in a common grave, as a tribute to their fight "for the law and for the estate".

Matthew of the Bride, a scholar born in Egypt and who had studied in Constantinople, arrived in Wallachia as abbot of the Dealu Monastery and later of the Bistrița Monastery, wrote about Radu Șerban in the preface to his work The Life of Saint Gregory the Decapolis:

He was a wise, kind, brave, gentle and merciful man; he loved the poor and strangers alike; he ruled his country and his estate well; [...] he did not like unrest, he only wanted peace with everyone.

== Ktetor ==
Continuing the tradition of his predecessors, Radu Șerban was an important founder of monasteries and churches.

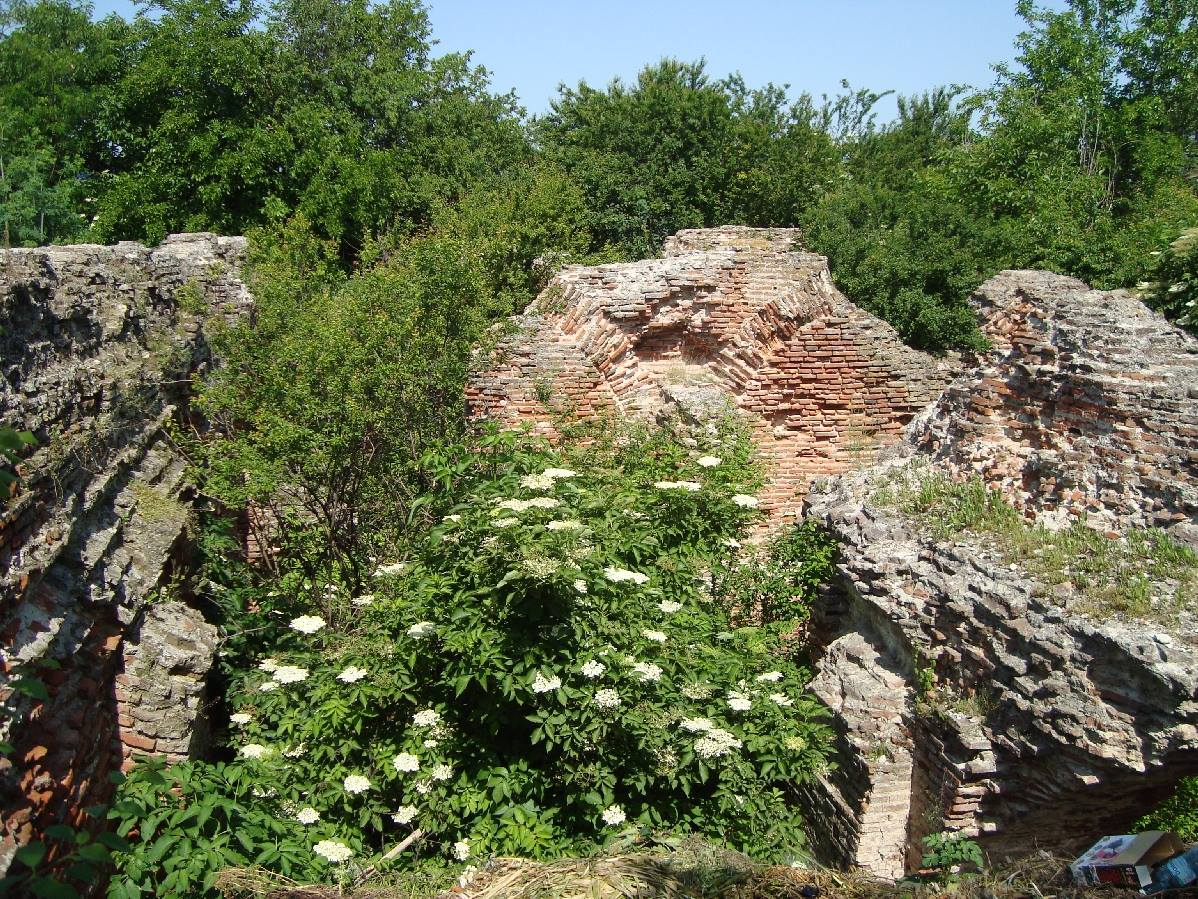
The royal court of Dobreni - ruin

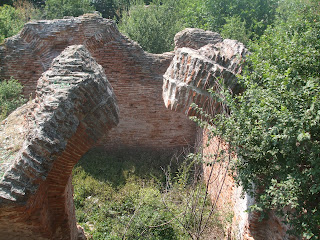

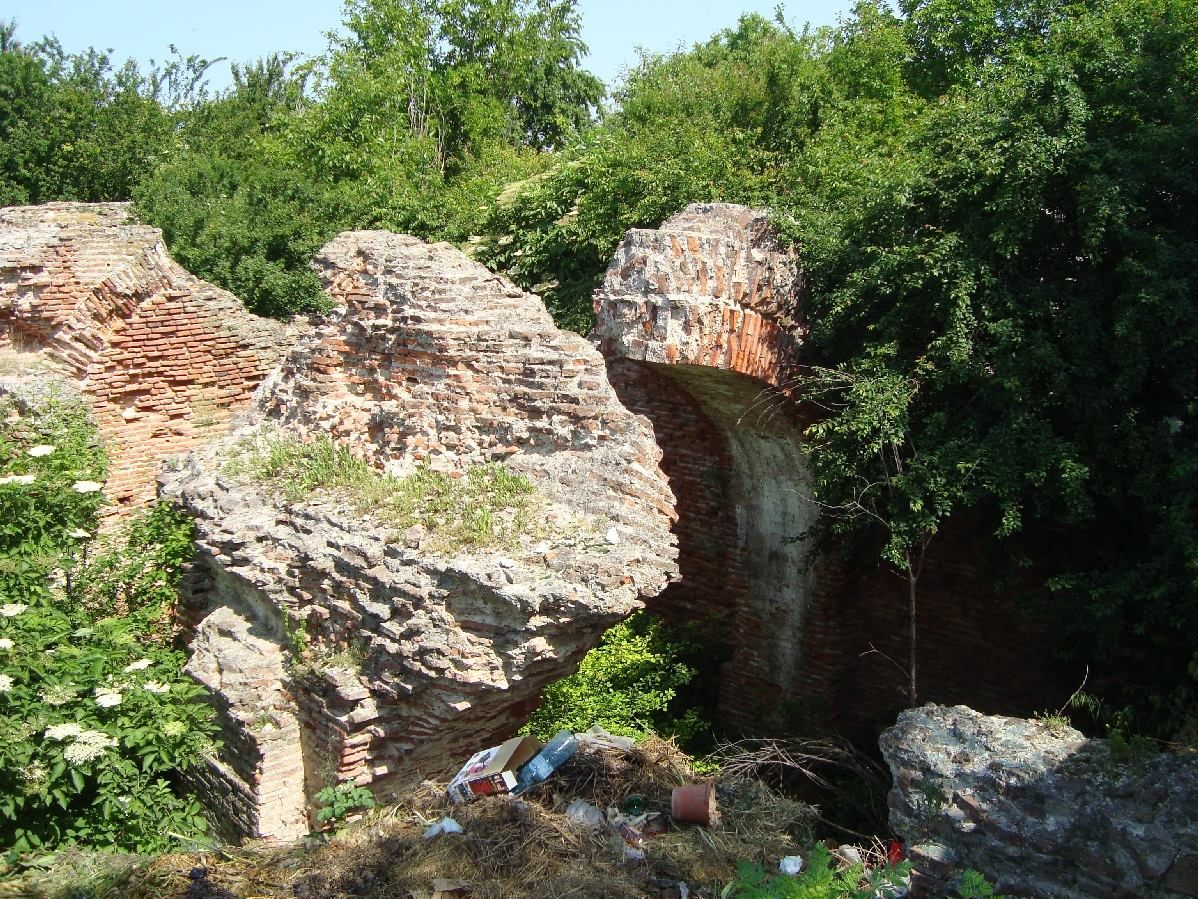

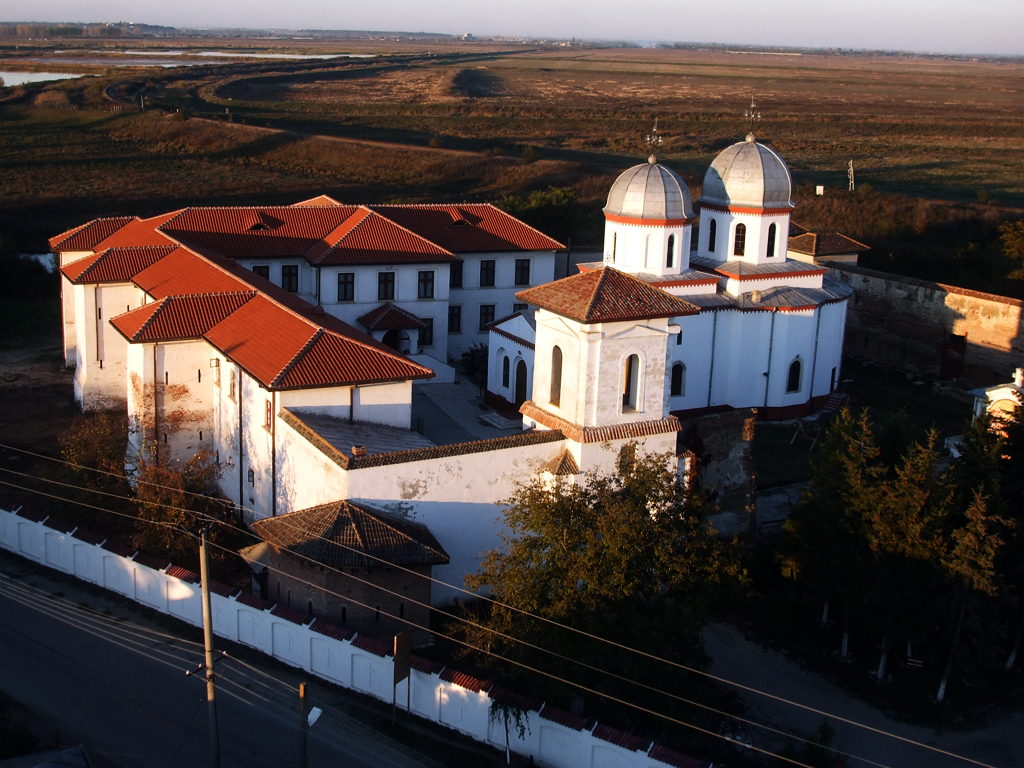
Comana monastery

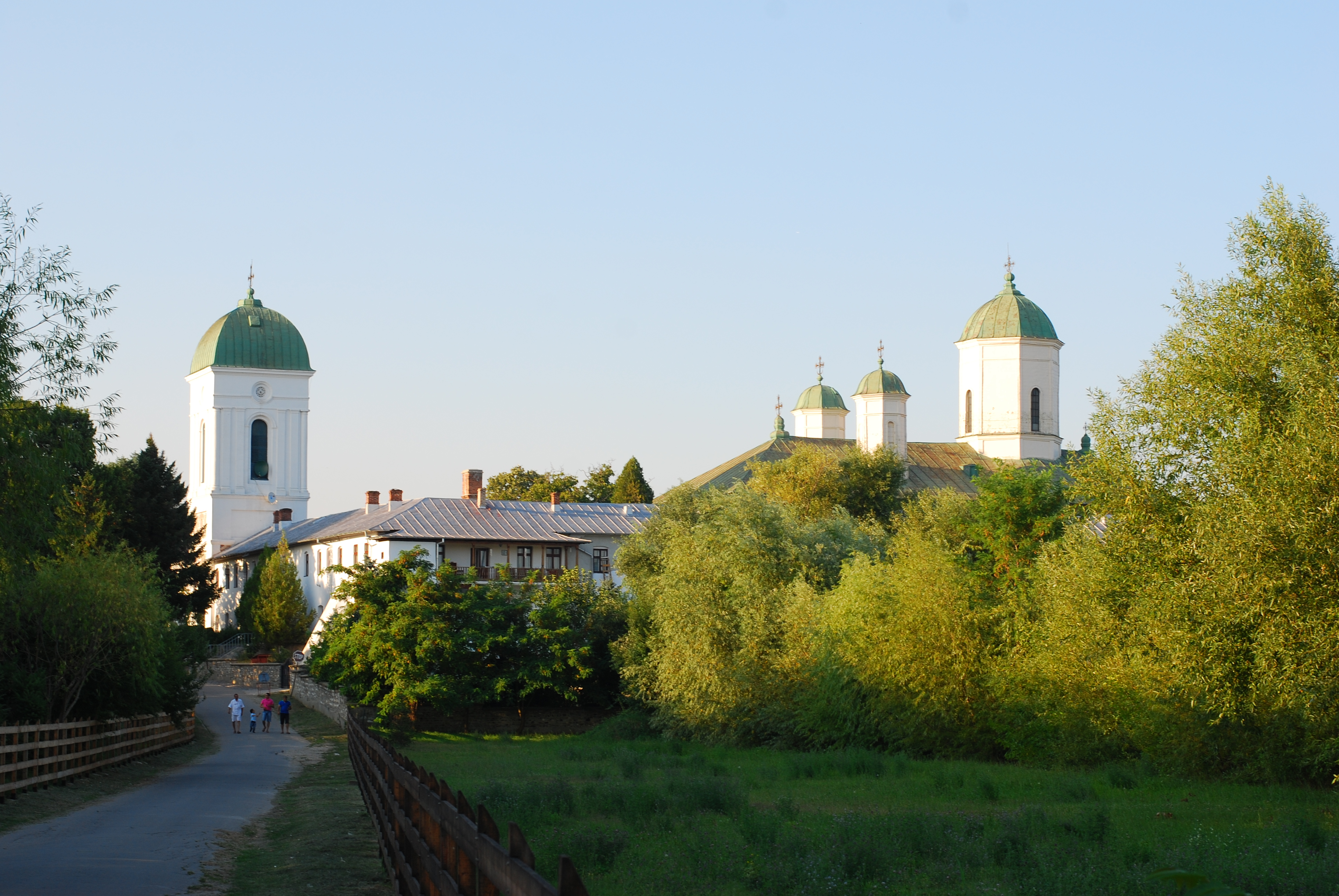
Cernica monastery

He rebuilt the Comana Monastery, founded in 1461 by Vlad the Impaler, which had completely fallen into ruin. In 1588, before becoming the ruler of Wallachia, he began the construction of a monastic settlement in the old enclosure, which was located on land inherited from his mother.

Radu Șerban built a new fortified monastic settlement, resembling a plain fortress, with thick stone and brick walls, four defensive towers and a bell tower at the entrance. The church, dedicated to Saint Hierarch Nicholas, was painted in 1609, and in the votive painting in the narthex the ruler appears together with his wife Elina, wearing the princely insignia, according to the founding tradition.

Also during the reign of Radu Șerban, in 1608, the Cernica Monastery was built, which was founded by the great herald of Michael the Brave, Cernica Știrbei, and his wife, Chiajna.

== Arms ==
Coat of arms of Radu Șerban as Wallachian pretender

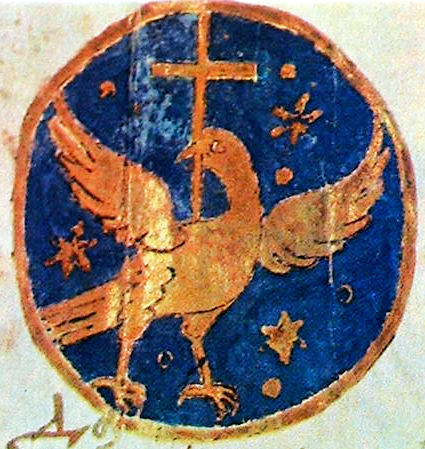
Wallachian coat of arms in 1608

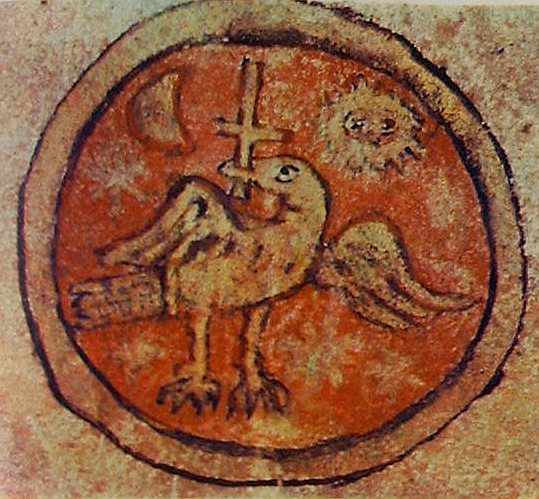
Wallachian Coat of Arms in 1608

Emblem of Wallachia under Radu Șerban 1608
