= Ștefan IX Tomșa =

Prince of Moldavia (died after 1623)

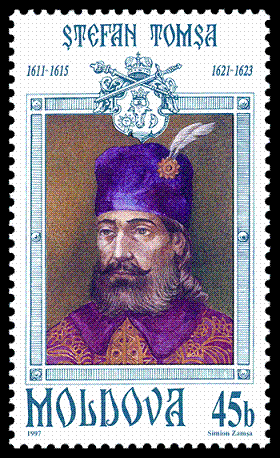

Prince of Moldavia (1st reign)
- Reign: 20 November 1611 – 22 November 1615
- Predecessor: Constantin Movilă
- Successor: Alexandru Movilă

Prince of Moldavia (2nd reign)
- Reign: September 1621 – August 1623
- Predecessor: Alexandru IV Iliaș
- Successor: Radu Mihnea
- Born: before 1564
- Died: after 1623
- Spouse: Ginerva
- House: Bogdan-Mușat
- Father: Ștefan Tomșa
- Religion: Orthodox

Stefan Tomşa IX (or II), (? – after 1623) of Moldavia was Prince of Moldavia for two reigns, in 1611–1615 and in 1621–1623. His reigns were concurrent with the period of Romanian and Eastern European history known as the Moldavian Magnate Wars, a long conflict in the early modern states of Moldavia, Wallachia, and Transylvania, in which the Moldavian state was alternatively influenced by the Austrian Habsburgs, the Ottoman Empire, and the Polish–Lithuanian Commonwealth. He was placed on the throne of Moldavia in 1611 following the deposition of the preceding Prince, Constantin Movila by the Ottomans, in the same year as Radu Mihnea was placed on the throne of neighboring Wallachia.

== Biography ==
Records of Stefan Tomsa's life before taking the throne report that he served as a professional soldier and mercenary in many European conflicts, including in the service of Henri of Navarre and taking part in a siege of the Spanish town of Jaca. He married a western woman named Ginevra, whom he remained married to when he became the Prince of Moldavia. Stefan Tomsa then served under the Polish King Stefan Bathory, before moving on to the Ottoman Empire, where he took part in the wars between Safavid Persia and the Ottoman Empire, during which he probably became well known to the Ottoman authorities.

Stefan's origins are unknown, but he claimed to be the son of Prince Ștefan Tomșa VII of Moldavia, a claim which was supported by the Ottomans, who maintained close relations with their client Prince as part of their developing struggle with the Polish–Lithuanian Commonwealth. Stefan's relations with the Commonwealth, however, were less than cordial, and his first reign would be beset by conflict with the Polish aligned members of nobility of Moldavia and the powerful Movila family.

In addition to taking part in battles with the Polish and the House of Movilești, Stefan Tomsa IX was also known for his extensive building projects, including a large monastery in the village of Solca, and for attempting to improve the lives of the poor in curbing the power of the major boyars.

== Wars with the Polish ==
In 1612, the Movilas and their allies, which included influential Moldavian boyars and statesmen Nicoară Prăjescu, Stroici, Dumitru Buhuș, and Pătrașcu Ciogolea pleaded for support from Poland. The deposed Constantin Movila returned to Moldavia with the support of an invading Polish army under Stefan Potocki and the Polish Field Hetman, Stanisław Żółkiewski. Tomsa raised an army which included mercenaries, Ottomans, and a sizable detachment of Crimean Tartars under his ally, the powerful Khan Temir (or Cantemir) Bey to meet them. The two sides met near Iasi, at the Battle of Cornul lui Sas. Stefan Tomsa's forces were victorious, and relations between the Turks and the Poles continues to deteriorate which culminated in the Polish–Ottoman War (1620–1621). Constantin Movila died after the battle while crossing the Dniester as a prisoner of the Tartars.

Despite Stefan Tomsa's defeat of the Polish detachment, troubles persisted between him and many of the leading boyars. These manifested in revolts in 1613 and 1615, which were both suppressed. However, Moldavia was invaded again by the Poles in late 1615, who defeated Stefan Tomsa and made him flee the country. The Poles would place Alexander Movila on the throne, the son of the deposed Prince Constantin Movila. Stefan continued to struggle with the Movilas throughout Alexander's reign, with the support of Radu Mihnea. In August of 1616, Alexander Movila was defeated by a Moldavian and Turkish army which included foreign mercenaries. He and other members of his family were captured and sent to Constantinople, where he was executed. Stefan Tomsa was not made ruler of Moldavia as he had lost favor with the Ottoman court after 1615. Radu Minhea instead would rule as Prince of Moldavia until 1619.

Following the Ottoman–Polish War in 1621, Stefan Tomsa returned for a second rule of Moldavia. During his second reign, he attempted to make concessions with his pro-Commonwealth rivals in the nobility. These came to nothing as he was again deposed two years later by the Ottomans, this time permanently. Stefan Tomsa would die in the Bosphorus region of Ottoman Turkey.
