= Năvîrneț =

- Village
- Location within Moldova
- Coordinates: 47.5877777778°N 27.5605555556°E
- Country: Moldova
- District: Fălești District

Government
  - Mayor: Adrian Găină (independent)

Population (2014 census)
  - Total: 2,505
- Time zone: UTC+2 (EET)
  - Summer (DST): UTC+3 (EEST)

Năvîrneț is a village in Fălești District, Moldova.

== Demographics ==
According to the 2014 Moldovan census, Năvîrneț had a population of 2,505 residents. The village covers an area of 37 km², resulting in a population density of approximately 67.7 inhabitants per square kilometer as of 2014. Between the 2004 and 2014 censuses, Năvîrneț experienced a modest population decline of about 1%.

The gender distribution was fairly balanced, with women making up 51.2% of the population and men 48.8%. In terms of age structure, 17.7% of residents were children aged 0–14, 72.4% were of working age (15–64), and 9.9% were elderly people aged 65 and over. The entire population lived in rural areas.

Almost all residents (99.4%) were born in Moldova, with a small number (0.6%) born in other Commonwealth of Independent States countries. The vast majority identified as Moldovan (96.8%), with small Romanian (2.7%) and Ukrainian (0.5%) minorities. Moldovan was the most commonly reported native language (78.6%), followed by Romanian (20.9%), with very few speaking Ukrainian or Russian.

Religious affiliation was overwhelmingly Orthodox, with 99.7% of residents identifying as such.

== Administration and local government ==
Năvîrneț is governed by a local council composed of eleven members. The most recent local elections, in November 2023, resulted in the following composition: 9 councillors from the Revival Party and 2 councillors from the Party of Action and Solidarity. In the same elections, Adrian Găină who ran independently, was elected as mayor with a 80.89% majority, comfortably beating the Party of Action and Solidarity candidate, Valentin Coman.
