= Teodor Andrzej Potocki =

Polish nobleman (1664–1738)

His Excellency Teodor Andrzej Potocki
- Archbishop of Gniezno; Primate of Poland
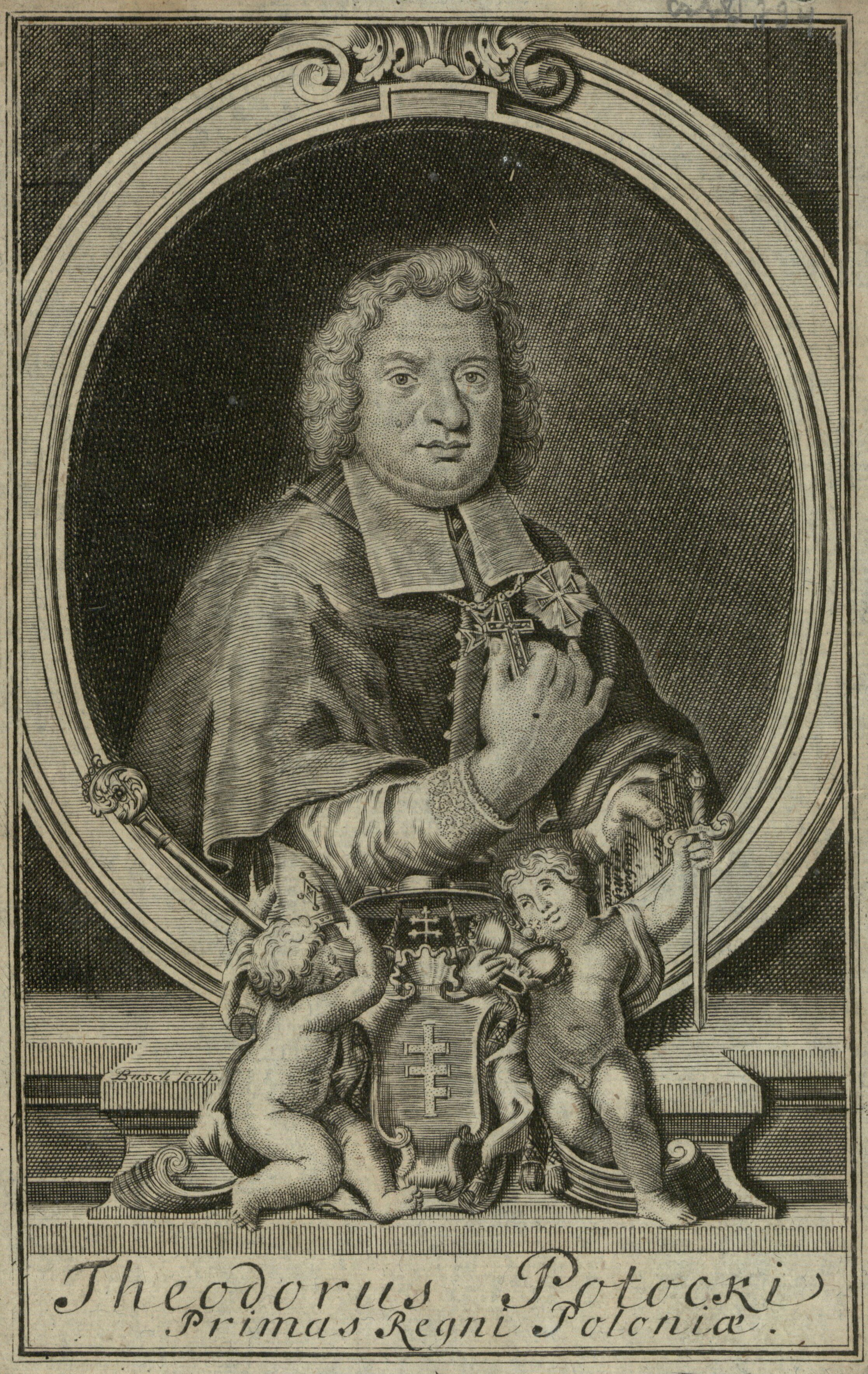
- Teodor Potocki
- Coat of arms: Piława
- Born: 13 February 1664; Moscow, Russia
- Died: 12 December 1738 (aged 74); Warsaw, Poland
- Noble family: Potocki
- Father: Paweł Potocki
- Mother: Eleonora Soltykow

Teodor Andrzej Potocki (13 February 1664 – 12 December 1738) was a Polish nobleman (szlachcic), Primate of Poland, interrex in 1733.

Teodor was Rector of Przemyśl and canon of Kraków since 1687, Bishop of Chełmno since 1699 and Bishop of Warmia (Ermland) since 1711. In 1722 Teodor became Archbishop of Gniezno and Primate of Poland.

He became interrex after the death of Augustus II of Poland and led the election of a new king in Wola. In 1733 he declared and crowned Stanisław I Leszczyński as the successor to Augustus II on the Polish throne. He supported Leszczyński during the following War of the Polish Succession.

Teodor was a protector of the Jesuit Order and benefactor of churches, monasteries and palaces.

Regnal titles
| Preceded by Andrzej Chryzostom Załuski | Prince-Bishop of Warmia (Ermland); 1724–1740 | Succeeded by Krzysztof Andrzej Jan Szembek |
Catholic Church titles
| Preceded by Stanisław Szembek | Primate of Poland; Archbishop of Gniezno; 1723–1738 | Succeeded by Krzysztof Szembek |
