= Vădeni, Soroca =

Vădeni
- Commune
- Location within Moldova
- Coordinates: 48°00′N 28°14′E
- Country: Moldova
- District: Soroca District
- Elevation: 189 m (620 ft)

Population (2014)
  - Total: 1,922
- Time zone: UTC+2 (EET)
  - Summer (DST): UTC+3 (EEST)
- Postal code: MD-3047

Vădeni is a commune in Soroca District, Moldova. It is composed of two villages, Dumbrăveni and Vădeni.
