= Movilești =

Polish-Moldavian noble family

The coat of arms of Movileşti family

Chrysobull of Ieremia Movilă, written in Old Church Slavonic, 1606; currently at Vatopedi Monastery, Mount Athos

The House of Movileşti, also Movilă or Moghilă (Polish: Mohyła, Cyrillic: Могила), was a family of boyars in the principality of Moldavia, which became related through marriage with the Mușatin family – the traditional House of Moldavian sovereigns.

According to legend, the family name is connected to the aprod Purice, a low-ranking boyar during the time of Prince Stephen the Great (ruled 1457–1504). Purice is said to have gained Stephen's recognition after kneeling down and helping the diminutive prince mount a fresh horse during battle. After emerging victorious, the ruler awarded him large estates, and told him that his family was to be known not by the rather crude Purice ("flea"), but as Movilă ("hill").

They rose to political prominence during the latter part of the 16th century. Several of the Movileşti were favourable to an alliance with the Polish–Lithuanian Commonwealth, intermarried with the Potocki family, and took refuge to southern Poland after being faced with Ottoman reprisals (no longer present in the competitions for the throne after 1634). They survived as szlachta, being awarded a Polish coat of arms (the Mohyła coat of arms).

== Members ==
=== Princes ===
In Moldavia:

- Ieremia Movilă
  - Regina/Raina Mohyła, married Prince Michał Wiśniowiecki h. Korybut
  - Katarzyna Mohyła, married Prince Samuel Korecki h. Pogoń Litewska
  - Maria Amalia Mohyła, married Stefan Potocki h. Pilawa
  - Anna Mohyła, married 1. Maksymilian Przerembski h. Nowina, 2. Jan Sędziwój Czarnkowski h. Nałęcz, 3. Władysław Myszkowski h. Jastrzębiec, 4. Stanisław "Rewera" Potocki h. Pilawa
- Simion Movilă
- Mihail Movilă
- Constantin Movilă
- Alexandru Movilă
- Miron Barnovschi-Movilă
- Moise Movilă

In Wallachia:

- Simion Movilă
- Gabriel Movilă

=== Others ===
- Petro Mohyla – Metropolitan of Kiev.
- Grigore Ureche – Chronicler and high-ranking boyar (Logofăt, Spătar and Great Vornic) in Moldavia

== Family tree ==
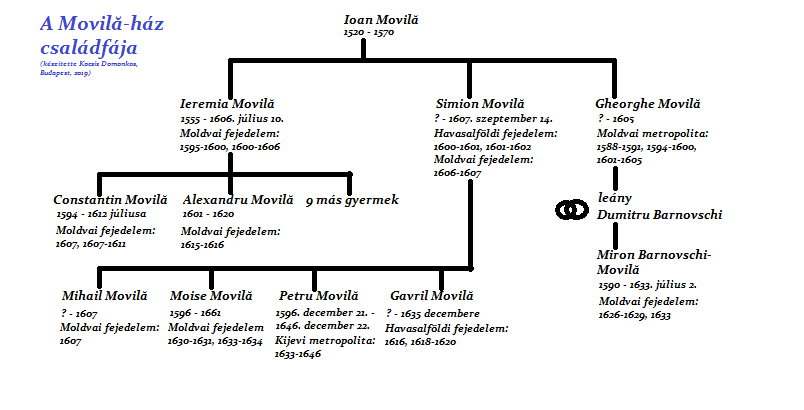

== Gallery ==
Petro Mohyla coat of arms

== See also ==
- Moldavian Magnate Wars
- Movilă (surname)
