= Constantin Movilă =

Prince of Moldavia from 1607 to 1611

Prince of Moldavia (1st reign)
- Reign: October 1607
- Predecessor: Mihail Movilă
- Successor: Mihail Movilă

Prince of Moldavia (2nd reign)
- Reign: December 1607 – 20 November 1611
- Predecessor: Mihail Movilă
- Successor: Ștefan IX Tomșa
- Born: 1594
- Died: July 1612 (aged 17–18); Wallachia
- Dynasty: Movilești
- Father: Ieremia Movilă
- Mother: Elisabeta Movilă
- Religion: Orthodox

Constantin Movilă (1594 – July 1612) was the Prince of Moldavia from 1607 to 1611. The son of Prince Ieremia Movilă and driven by his mother, the ambitious Erszébet Csomortany de Losoncz, he twice seized the Moldovan throne at the expense of his cousin Mihai Movilă, son of Simion I Movilă in 1607.

In 1610 he welcomed Prince Radu X Șerban of Wallachia who was exiled. The following year he was dethroned by Ștefan Tomșa, the second son of the ephemeral prince of Moldova, Ștefan VII Tomșa.

As a refugee in Poland, he attempted to regain the throne leading an army assembled by his Polish brothers-in-law. Defeated at the Battle of Cornul lui Sas, he had to pass the Dniester river again, but once on the left side of the bank, he was captured by the Tatars. He escaped but then drowned in the river in July 1612 at the age of about 17

== Sources ==
- Alexandru Dimitrie Xenopol Histoire des Roumains de la Dacie trajane : Depuis les origines jusqu'à l'union des principautés. E Leroux Paris (1896)
- Nicolas Iorga Histoire des Roumains et de la romanité orientale. (1920)
- (in Romanian) Constantin C. Giurescu & Dinu C. Giurescu, Istoria Românilor Volume III (depuis 1606), Editura Științifică și Enciclopedică, București, 1977.
- Jean Nouzille La Moldavie, Histoire tragique d'une région européenne, Ed. Bieler, ISBN 2-9520012-1-9.
- Gilles Veinstein, Les Ottomans et la mort (1996) ISBN 9004105050.
- Joëlle Dalegre Grecs et Ottomans 1453-1923. De la chute de Constantinople à la fin de l'Empire Ottoman, L'Harmattan Paris (2002) ISBN 2747521621.

Preceded by Mihail Movilă	Prince of Moldavia; 1607	Succeeded by Mihail Movilă
Preceded by Mihail Movilă	Prince of Moldavia; 1607–1611	Succeeded by Ștefan IX Tomșa
