= Radu Mihnea =

Prince of Wallachia (r. 1601–1602; 1611–1616; 1620–1623)

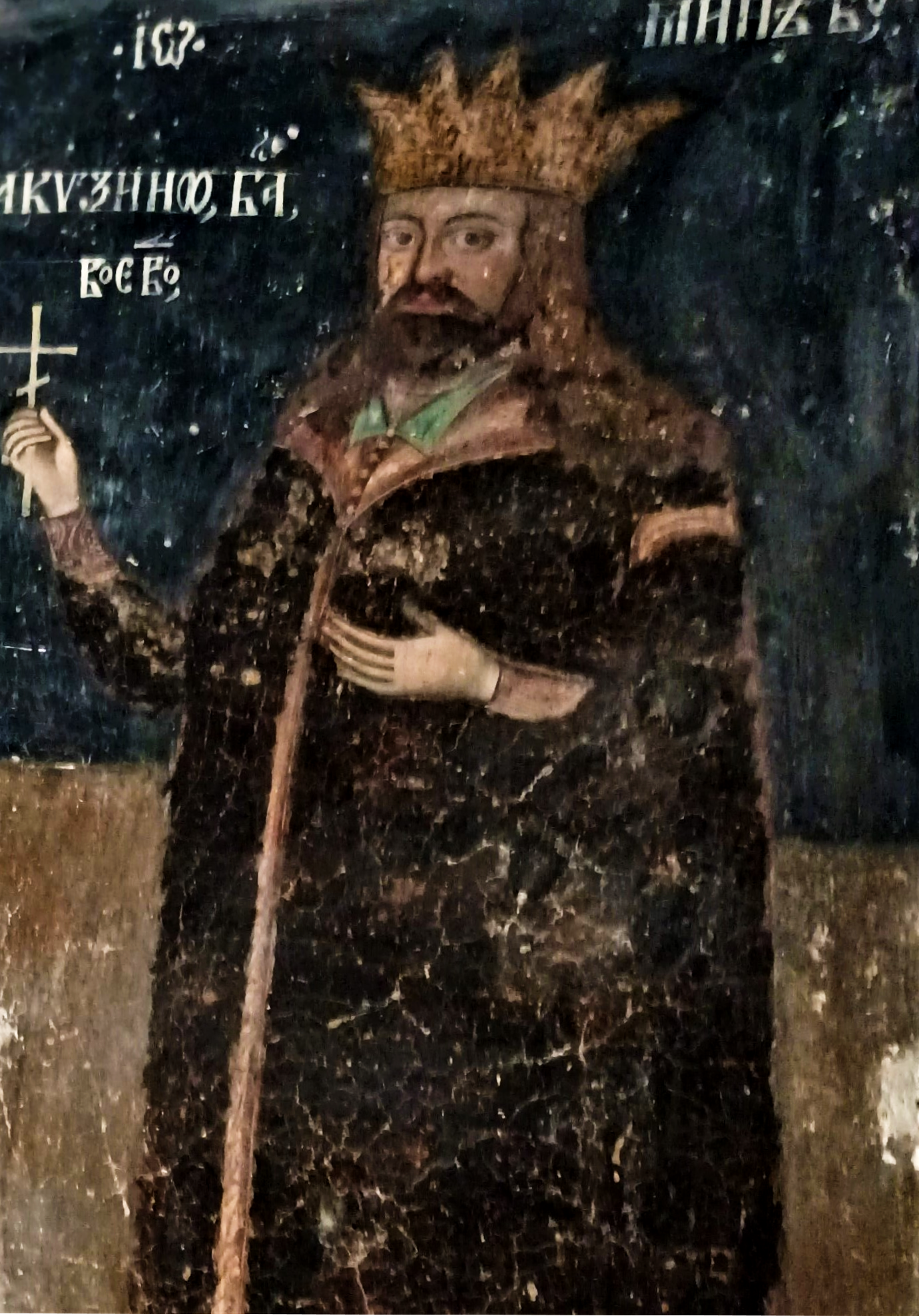

Prince of Wallachia (1st reign)
- Reign: November 1601 – March 1602
- Predecessor: Simion Movilă
- Successor: Simion Movilă

Prince of Wallachia (2nd reign)
- Reign: April – May 1611
- Predecessor: Gabriel Báthory
- Successor: Radu Șerban

Prince of Wallachia (3rd reign)
- Reign: 12 September 1611 – August 1616
- Predecessor: Radu Șerban
- Successor: Gabriel Movilă

Prince of Moldavia (1st reign)
- Reign: 24 July 1616 – 9 February 1619
- Predecessor: Alexandru Movilă
- Successor: Gaspar Graziani

Prince of Wallachia (4th reign)
- Reign: August 1620 – August 1623
- Predecessor: Gabriel Movilă
- Successor: Alexandru Coconul

Prince of Moldavia (2nd reign)
- Reign: 4 August 1623 – 13 January 1626
- Predecessor: Ștefan IX Tomșa
- Successor: Miron Barnovschi-Movilă
- Born: 1586; Istanbul
- Died: 13 January 1626 (aged 39–40); Moldavia
- Spouse: Arghira Minetti (five children)
- Issue: Alexandru Coconul; Mihnea III (alleged)
- Dynasty: Drăculești
- Father: Mihnea II Turcitul
- Mother: Voica Bratcul
- Religion: Eastern Orthodox

Radu Mihnea (1586 – 13 January 1626) was the voivode (prince) of Wallachia between September 1601 and March 1602, and again between March and May 1611, September 1611 and August 1616, and August 1620 and August 1623. He was also the voivode (prince) of Moldavia from 1616 to 1619 and 1623 to 1626. He was the illegitimate son of Mihnea Turcitul by Voica Bratcul.

== Renaissance prince and family man ==
Radu Mihnea spent part of his early years in Koper (Capodistria), on Mount Athos and in Greece. His stay in the Serenissima accounts for the pro-Venetian character of his rule and his interest in reforming the institutions of Wallachia and Moldavia. After completing his studies in Istanbul, Radu became prince of Wallachia at a very important time in Romanian history: following the union of the three principalities of Wallachia, Moldavia, and Transylvania under Michael the Brave.

Radu would rule no less than four times in Wallachia and twice in Moldavia. He was loved due to his Renaissance style and love of the arts. This was due to his upbringing by the monks of Iveron at Mount Athos, Greece. Radu Mihnea died in 1626 in Hârlău, Moldavia, and his body was carried to Bucharest and interred at the Radu Vodă Monastery. The monastery was protected by the monks of Mount Athos due to Radu's loyalty to his educators. Radu and his wife Arghira Minetti had five children, three boys and two girls. These five would be the last surviving direct descendants of Vlad III Dracula. The eldest was Alexandru Coconul.

He replaced Polish vassal Simion Movilă on the throne in Bucharest after the brief occupation of Wallachia by the troops of hetmans Jan Zamoyski and Jan Karol Chodkiewicz. His first rule in the country signified the return to Ottoman control, interrupted since Michael the Brave.

Radu appears to have been interested in a joint rule over Wallachia and Moldavia. He came closest to achieving it when his third rule over Moldavia was doubled by the reign of his son Alexandru Coconul in Wallachia. The subtlety of this gesture is discarded in several sources:

- Radulo, who is nowadays Prince in Moldavia, and his son [who is Prince] in Wallachia, [the latter] being very young and overseen by his father (Venetian document of April 11, 1625).
- Radulo Voivode, Prince of Wallachia and Moldavia (various documents).
- Radu Mihnea's tombstone bears the carving of both countries' seals.

== Descendants ==
An article in a Romanian newspaper in the 1950s acknowledged the death of the last direct male descendant of Radu Mihnea Voda, Dumitru Radulescu (Radu)- a church, artist painter. However, it is not widely known that female descendants of Radu Mihnea do, in fact, still live in Bucharest. In fact, the bloodline extends as far as the 10th generation through the continuing lineage of the sister of Dumitru Radu, Rozalia Matilda Radulescu (Radu). She married a pharmacist Gheorghe Moraru and had five children, out of which only two survived, Matilda Virginia and Maria-Florica.

== Gallery ==
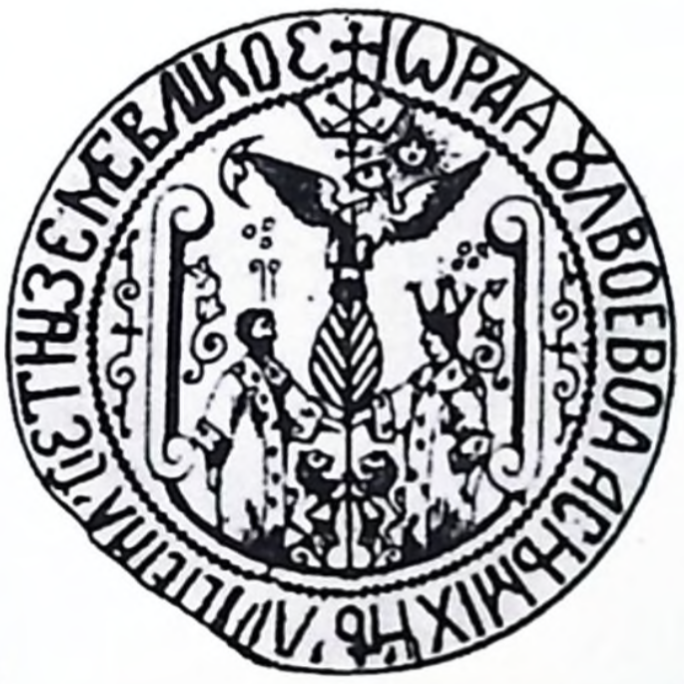
Seal of Radu Mihnea featured on a 1623 document

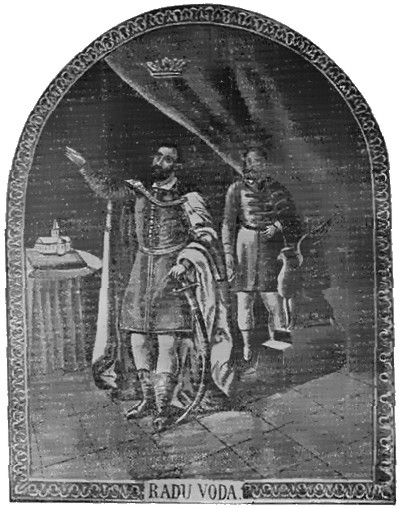
Radu Mihnea – rendition of a portrait in Radu Vodă Monastery, Bucharest

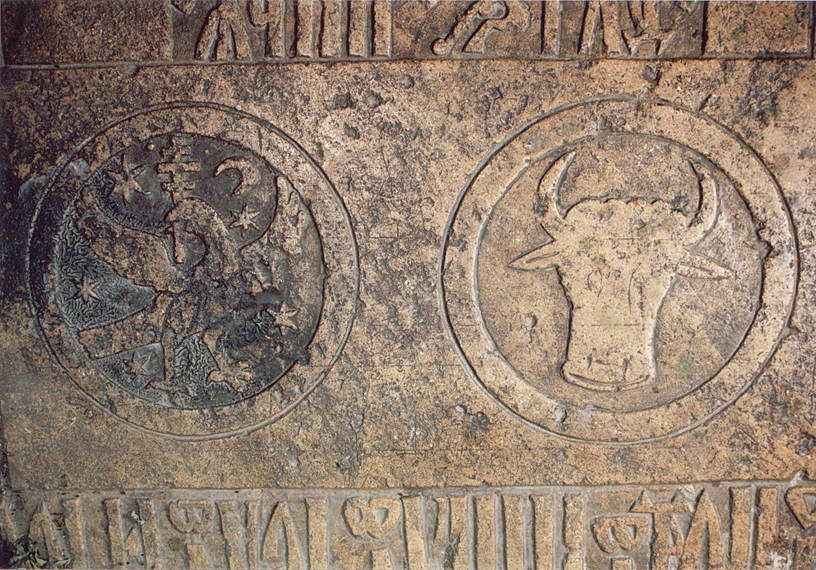
Radu Mihnea's tombstone with the coats of arms of Wallachia and Moldavia (detail)

== See also ==
- Moldavian Magnate Wars

Preceded by Simion Movilă	Voivode of Wallachia; 1601–1602	Succeeded by Simion Movilă
Preceded by Gabriel Báthory, Prince of Transylvania	Voivode of Wallachia; 1611	Succeeded by Radu Şerban
Preceded by Radu Şerban	Voivode of Wallachia; 1611–1616	Succeeded by Gabriel Movilă
Preceded by Gabriel Movilă	Voivode of Wallachia; 1620–1623	Succeeded by Alexandru Coconul
Preceded by Alexandru Movilă	Voivode of Moldavia; 1616–1619	Succeeded by Gaspar Graziani
Preceded by Ștefan IX Tomșa	Voivode of Moldavia; 1623–1626	Succeeded by Miron Barnovschi-Movilă
