= Elisabeta Movilă =

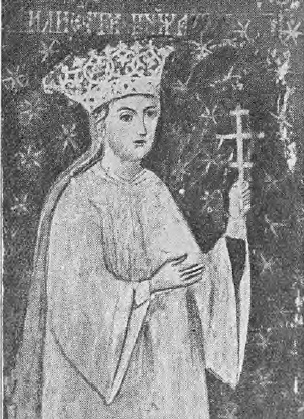
Elisabeta Movilă

Doamna Elisabeta Movilă (fl. 1620) was a Princess consort of Moldavia by marriage to Ieremia Movilă. She was regent in Moldavia in 1607–1611 on the behalf of her son Constantin I Movilă and her son Alexandru Movilă in 1615–1616. She was described as proud, ambitious and beautiful.

She is known for her support of her spouse against his brother Simion Movilă, and after his death her sons against their rivals, often with Polish military help.

The political instability caused by the succession crisis in Moldavia resulted in Ottoman attack in 1616, in which her she and her sons lead an army against the Ottomans, lost the battle and was captured on the battle field and taken to Constantinople. Her sons were forced to convert to Islam, while she was placed in the Ottoman harem.
