= Simion Movilă =

Prince of Wallachia (1559-1607)

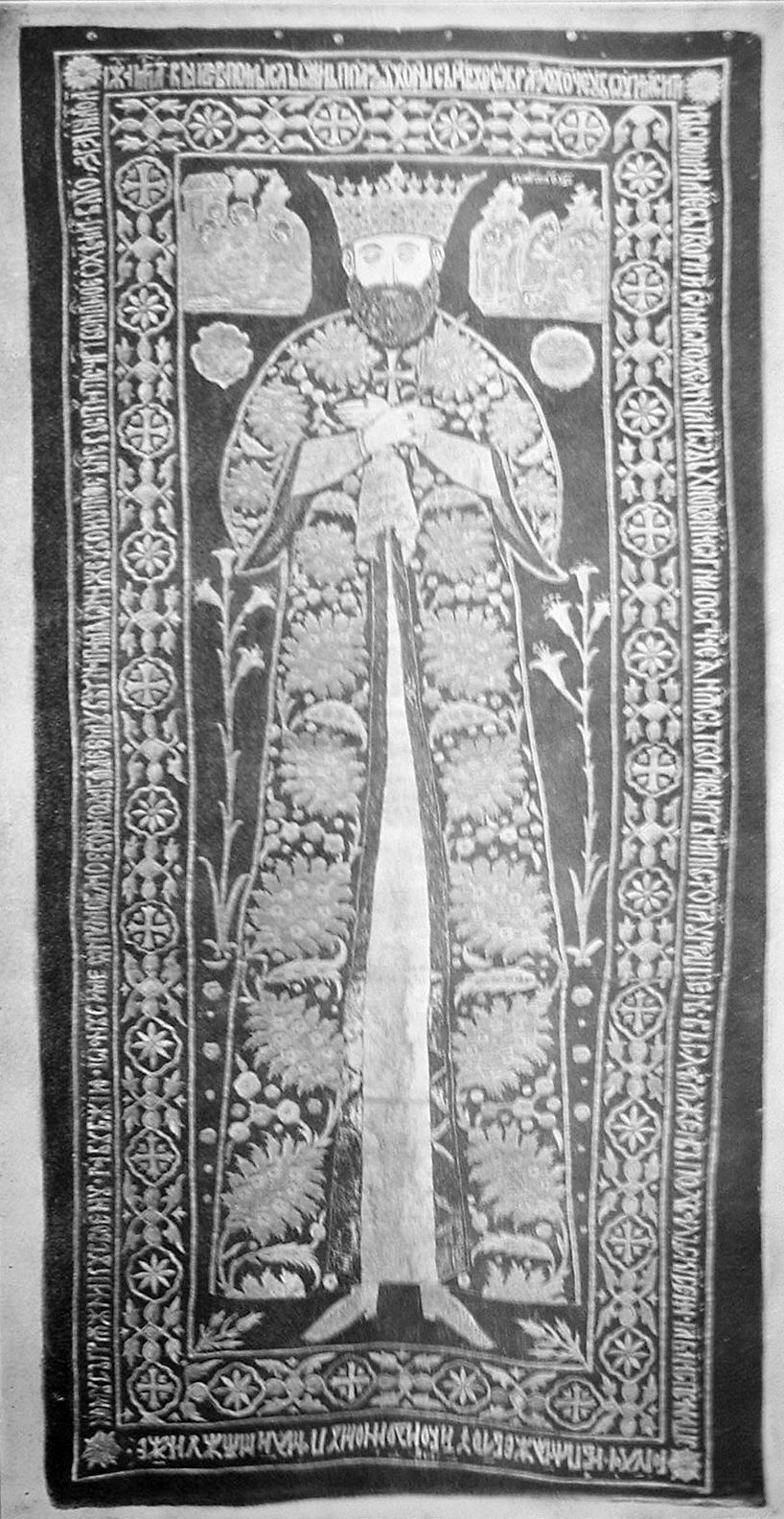

Prince of Wallachia (1st reign)
- Reign: November 1600 – June 1601
- Predecessor: Michael the Brave
- Successor: Radu Mihnea

Prince of Wallachia (2nd reign)
- Reign: October 1601 – August or July 1602
- Predecessor: Radu Mihnea
- Successor: Radu Șerban

Prince of Moldavia
- Reign: July 1606 – 14 September 1607
- Predecessor: Ieremia Movilă
- Successor: Mihail Movilă
- Born: After 1559
- Died: 14 September 1607
- Spouse: Marghita
- Issue: Petro Mohyla; Mihail Movilă; Gabriel Movilă
- House: Movilești family
- Father: Ioan Movilă
- Mother: Maria Movilă
- Religion: Orthodox

Simion Movilă (after 1559 – 14 September 1607), a boyar of the Movilești family, was twice Prince of Wallachia (November 1600 – June 1601; October 1601 – July 1602) and Prince of Moldavia from July 1606 until his death.

== Family ==
He was the grandson of Petru Rareș, younger brother of Ieremia Movilă, and father of Petro Mohyla, who became the Metropolitan of Kiev, Halych and All-Rus' (Note: Kiev, Halych, and All-Rus' were in the same Metropolis at the time.) from 1633 until his death, and later was canonized as a saint in the Russian, Romanian and Polish Orthodox Churches.

== Biography ==
In the early 1580s, Simion, along with his brothers, built Sucevița Monastery.

In October 1600, he was put on the throne of Wallachia by Polish forces.

In August 1602, Simion was defeated by Radu Șerban and forced into exile to Moldavia.

After the death of his brother Ieremia in July 1606, Simion gained the Moldavian throne. By making rich gifts, Simion managed to be recognized by the sultan. While he was ruler of Moldavia, he had hostile relations with the Poles.

== Death ==
He died on September 14, 1607, after a reign of only a year and a few months. His death was suspected to be the result of poisoning, which only further inflamed tensions around succession. This eventually spiralled into war, which was eventually won by his son Mihail after Polish support.

Simion was buried at the Sucevița Monastery.

Preceded by Michael the Brave	Prince of Wallachia; 1600–1601	Succeeded by Radu Mihnea
Preceded by Radu Mihnea	Prince of Wallachia; 1601–1602	Succeeded by Radu Şerban
Preceded by Ieremia Movilă	Prince of Moldavia; 1606–1607	Succeeded by Mihail Movilă

== Bibliography ==
- Alexandru Ioan Cuza university (2009). Medieval and Early Modern for Central and Eastern Europe. Al I Cuza University Press.
- Djuvar, Neagu (28 October 2016). A Brief Illustrated History of Romanians. Humanitas SA. ISBN 9789735053819.
- Göbl, Carol (1907). Catalogul manuscriptelor românești: întocmit de Ioan Bianu, bibliotecarul Academiei Române, Volume 1 (in Romanian).
- Kolodziejczyk, Dariusz (22 June 2011). The Crimean Khanate and Poland-Lithuania: International Diplomacy on the European Periphery (15th-18th Century). A Study of Peace Treaties Followed by Annotated Documents. BRILL. ISBN 978-9004191907.
- Miclescu-Prăjescu, I. (April 1971). "New Data regarding the Installation of Movilă Princes". The Slavonic and East European Review. 49 (115). Modern Humanities Research Association and University College London School of Slavonic and East European Studies: 214–234. JSTOR 4206367.
- Suciu, I. D. (1980). Unitatea poporului român: contribuții istorice bănățene (in Romanian). Facla.
