= Ieremia Movilă =

Prince of Moldavia from 1595-1600, and 1600-1606

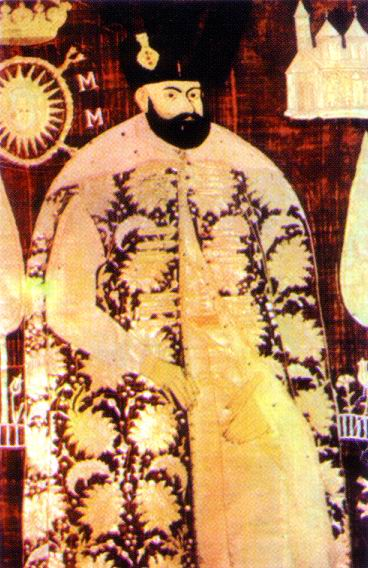
- Tomb veil of Movilă

Prince of Moldavia (1st reign)
- Reign: August 1595 – May 1600
- Predecessor: Ștefan Răzvan
- Successor: Michael the Brave

Prince of Moldavia (2nd reign)
- Reign: September 1600 – 10 July 1606
- Predecessor: Michael the Brave
- Successor: Simion Movilă
- Born: c. 1555
- Died: 10 July 1606; Iași
- Spouse: Elisabeta Movilă
- Dynasty: Movilești
- Religion: Orthodox

Ieremia Movilă (Polish: Jeremi Mohyła Ukrainian: Єремія Могила; c. 1555 – 10 July [O.S. 30 June] 1606) was a Voivode (Prince) of Moldavia between August 1595 and May 1600, and again between September 1600 and 10 July 1606. At the time, Moldavia was a vassal province of the Polish–Lithuanian Commonwealth.

== Rule ==
Moldavian Banner under Prince Ieremia Movilă, from a trove of flags captured at Gurăslău by the Wallachian armies of Michael the Brave and kept as trophies by the Habsburgs. Flag of the Principality of Moldavia under Prince Ieremia Movilă (1595–1600)

A boyar of the Movilești family, Ieremia was placed on the throne in Iași by Polish Kanclerz (Chancellor) and hetman Jan Zamoyski after the ousting of Ștefan Răzvan. Zamoyski's intervention had been prompted by Răzvan's acceptance of Imperial tutelage over Moldavia, after having received backing from Transylvanian Prince Sigismund Báthory and Emperor Rudolf II. The potential conflict with the country's Ottoman overlord was defused after the Poles negotiated an agreement with Sinan Pasha, although Moldavia was invaded by the Khan of the Crimean Tatars, Ğazı II Giray. Poland and the Turks signed the Treaty of Cecora after the defeat of Tatar troops in October, with the Porte agreeing to Ieremia's rule.

Moldavia became a vassal of both countries, still owing tribute to the Ottomans. Ştefan Răzvan tried to return on the throne, but he was faced with the ruthless resistance of Zamoyski and Movilă, being captured and impaled.

Ieremia's rule faced a more formidable foe in Wallachian Prince Michael the Brave (Mihai Viteazul), who, after having crushed Andrew Báthory's armies in Transylvania and installed himself Prince in Alba Iulia, turned on Moldavia.

Michael managed to conquer virtually all of the country (except for Polish-occupied Hotin) and sent his troops to fight the Commonwealth presence in Pokuttya. The tide quickly turned, with hetmans Stanisław Żółkiewski and Jan Karol Chodkiewicz obtaining crucial victories in Moldavia itself and taking the fighting into Wallachia (see Battle of Bukowo), briefly expanding Polish rule to the main section of the Danube and placing Ieremia back on his throne, with his brother Simion the new Prince in Bucharest. In the meanwhile, Michael was assassinated at Câmpia Turzii by his Imperial ally Giorgio Basta, with Transylvania becoming an Imperial fiefdom.

With the start of the Polish-Swedish War, Poland had to retreat from Wallachia. Simion was deposed by the Wallachians, and replaced with Radu Şerban in 1601; Poland managed to keep control of Moldavia.

During his rule, Ieremia rebuilt the Suceviţa Monastery, where he is now buried.

After his death, his sons attempted to ally with Poland.

== Family ==
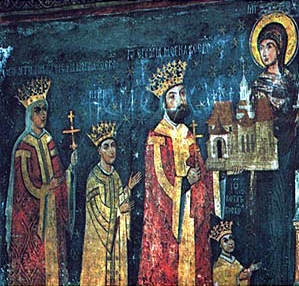
Ieremia Movilă and his family (depicted at the Suceviţa Monastery)

Ieremia's mother was Maria (d. between 1614 and 1616), daughter of Petru Rareş. He was married to the Hungarian lady Elzbieta Csomortany de Losoncz (d. in Istanbul c. 1617), whose influence was instrumental in a rise in Roman Catholicism in early 17th century Moldavia.

His sons were all successive Moldavian rulers, while his daughters were married into Polish and Ruthenian noble Szlachta families: Anna Mohyła (1579–1667) to Stanisław "Rewera" Potocki in 1658 or 1661, Maria (d. 10 December 1638) to Stefan Potocki, Raina Mohyła (d. c.1619) to Michał Wiśniowiecki, Catherina Movilă (died 1618) to prince Samuel Korecki.

== See also ==
- Moldavian Magnate Wars
- Mohyliv-Podilskyi

| Preceded by Ştefan Răzvan | Prince/Voivode of Moldavia; 1595–1600 | Succeeded by Mihai Viteazul |
| Preceded by Mihai Viteazul | Prince/Voivode of Moldavia; 1600–1606 | Succeeded by Simion Movilă |
