= Udrea Băleanu =

Romanian statesman and military commander

- Seal used by Băleanu in 1598, as described by Octav-George Lecca

Ban of Oltenia
- In office September 1, 1598 – June 14, 1599

Co-regent of Moldavia
- In office May – July 1600

Personal details
- Born: unknown date Dâmbovița County?
- Died: ca. May 1601
- Spouse: Mușa
- Relations: Pătrașcu the Good (cousin?); Michael the Brave (nephew?); Leca of Cătun (brother-in-law); Gheorghe Băleanu (great-nephew)

Military service
- Allegiance: Wallachia; Moldavia
- Years of service: May 4, 1596–November 1600
- Rank: Hetman
- Commands: Oltenian army Moldavian military forces
- Battles/wars: Long Turkish War: First Tarnovo Uprising; Battle of Șelimbăr; Moldavian Magnate Wars

Udrea Băleanu, also known as Băleanul, Banul Udrea, or Udrea of Băleni (? – ca. May 1601), was a Wallachian and Moldavian statesman and military commander. He was especially noted as a key supporter, and alleged uncle, of the unifying Prince Michael the Brave, serving under his command in the Long Turkish War. In the early stages of Michael's revolt against the Ottoman Empire, Băleanu drove the Wallachian military forces into Rumelia, relieving Nikopol. He served as Ban of Oltenia, then commanded supporting contingents in the 1599 campaign to annex Transylvania. The following year, Michael employed him as one of his four regents in Moldavia, and also made him commander of the Moldavian army, with the title of Hetman. This assignment made Băleanu a direct enemy of the Movilă dynasty, which claimed the Moldavian throne, and of the Movilăs' backers in the Polish–Lithuanian Commonwealth.

Returning to Transylvania in order to help Michael restore his regime in that country, Băleanu was called back to Wallachia, which had been invaded by the Poles. His forces held Curtea de Argeș and absorbed the Polish attack, allowing Michael to escape from the field. Băleanu was taken prisoner and handed over to the Polish-backed Prince, Simion Movilă. Various accounts suggest that he abjured Michael during his captivity, though this remains disputed. He was then beheaded without trial, causing tensions between Movilă and the Poles, who had vouched for the Ban's safety.

Băleanu was buried in Gorgota, at Panaghia Monastery, which he had built himself. He had no direct heirs, but was survived by brother-in-law Leca of Cătun and nephew Ivașco I Băleanu. Through the latter's descendants, the Băleanus remained important actors in the political intrigues of the 17th century. The Ban himself endured as a topic of historiographic controversy in the 19th century, as well as a literary hero—in works by Dimitrie Bolintineanu, Octav Dessila, and Mihnea Gheorghiu.

== Biography ==
=== Rise ===
Alive at a time when Wallachia and Moldavia, the two Danubian Principalities, were tributary states of the Ottoman Empire, Udrea was the scion of a high-ranking boyar family. The clan, which may have been ultimately related to the ruling House of Basarab, could document its ancestry to a Borcea of Slătioare, a Vornic of the 15th-century Wallachian Prince Dan II. They had a long-standing association with Dâmbovița County, owning an eponymous estate therein. Their indirect ancestor, Jupân Gherghina, was also ktitor of Nucet Monastery.

Udrea's father, Radu Băleanu, was the great Clucer (master of the Wallachian court) under Prince Petru Cercel; Radu's sister Voica was mother of another Prince, Pătrașcu the Good, alleged father of Michael the Brave. Udrea's uncle, Pătru, a Great Logothete, was father of another Vornic, Ivașco Băleanu; some sources, credited by archivist Theodor I. Holban, suggest that Pătru was Udrea's actual father. Through his mother Maria, Udrea was grandson of Stolnic Badea Aiaz Izvoranu. Maria and Radu also had a daughter, Grăjdana, who went on to marry Comis (stable-master) Leca of Cătun. Another son, Badea, never rose to high office, while two of Udrea's sisters, Zamfira and Melania, respectively married the boyars Hrizea and Para.

Udrea is first mentioned as an office bearer under Prince Mihnea Turcitul, serving as Comis between April 13, 1586 and May 22, 1588. According to later documents, he had inherited from his father a number of estates, including those at Bălteni, Stâlpeni, and Leurdeni. He is next mentioned a decade later, with the advent of Michael the Brave, when he climbed through the ranks of the military boyardom: on May 4, 1596, he was assigned the rank of Armaș, or chief warden of the prisons. He had lost the title by August 21, 1598, as specified in his will, completed on that date; the document also mentions his wife, Mușa, as well as the couple's patronage of Panaghia Monastery in Gorgota. By that moment, Michael the Brave had rebelled against the Ottomans, leading Wallachia into the Long Turkish War, part of a Holy League headed by the Holy Roman Empire. In 1596, the Wallachian military assisted the Bulgarian rebels, with Băleanu directing the raid on Nikopol.

As noted by Holban, Băleanu was a "general in the true sense of the word", rising above the limited expertise of armed boyars. On September 1, 1598, he was promoted to Great Ban of Oltenia, holding that title to June 14, 1599. During that interval, he commanded a force that managed to outwit Ottoman commander Hafiz Pasha, absconding with all his ammunition. For a while in 1599, Băleanu may have sided with dissident boyars, asking for Simion Movilă, brother of the Moldavian Prince Ieremia Movilă, to take the Wallachian throne from Prince Michael. In autumn of the same year, however, he resumed his activity as Michael's general: Michael led the main Wallachian thrust into Transylvania, while Băleanu and Radu Buzescu led a supporting march from Oltenia. Their force, also comprising hajduk irregulars under the command of Starina Novak, climbed up the Olt River by way of Rothenturm, joining up with Michael's forces before the Wallachian victory at Șelimbăr. According to scholar Octav-George Lecca, Băleanu may have also been designated as governor of Muntenia while Buzescu took over the administration of Oltenia; Holban regards Udrea as one of the regents, or Caimacami, of Wallachia.

Michael then conquered Moldavia from the Movilăs, and Băleanu was again a prominent participant in the events. He led the first strike on Moldavia, at a time when Michael was still stationed in Brețcu, where he met a German diplomatic mission; upon the seizure of Moldavia, Băleanu was left in charge of Hotin Fortress, alongside Novak and Deli-Marko. In May 1600, Michael made him Moldavia's Hetman, as well as one of the country's regents, alongside the Spatharios Negrea, the Armaș Sava, and the Vistier Andronikos Kantakouzenos. By July, Michael's nephew, Marcu Cercel, was groomed to take over as Prince of that country.

Also in July, Ban Udrea left his post in Suceava and led the Moldavian military forces into Transylvania, aiding Michael in his feud with a former Holy-League ally, Giorgio Basta. Another war erupted between Michael and Transylvania's Hungarian nobility, which recognized Sigismund Báthory as Prince of Transylvania. As noted by Holban, this group sought to compromise both Michael and Udrea by circulating a false letter from the former, mentioning the latter; this implied that "Udrea was also recognized as one of the leading boyars by the Hungarians themselves." The Hungarian–Wallachian standoff began in September, when the aristocrats refused to attend a Transylvanian Diet at Sebeșul Săsesc (Szászsebes). As reported by Jan Zamoyski, the rebels managed to face Michael's forces at Mirăslău before Udrea could arrive in to assist his liege. At one point in this development, the noblemen asked for Băleanu, Sava and Preda Buzescu to be taken as hostages and guarantees of a truce.

=== Killing ===
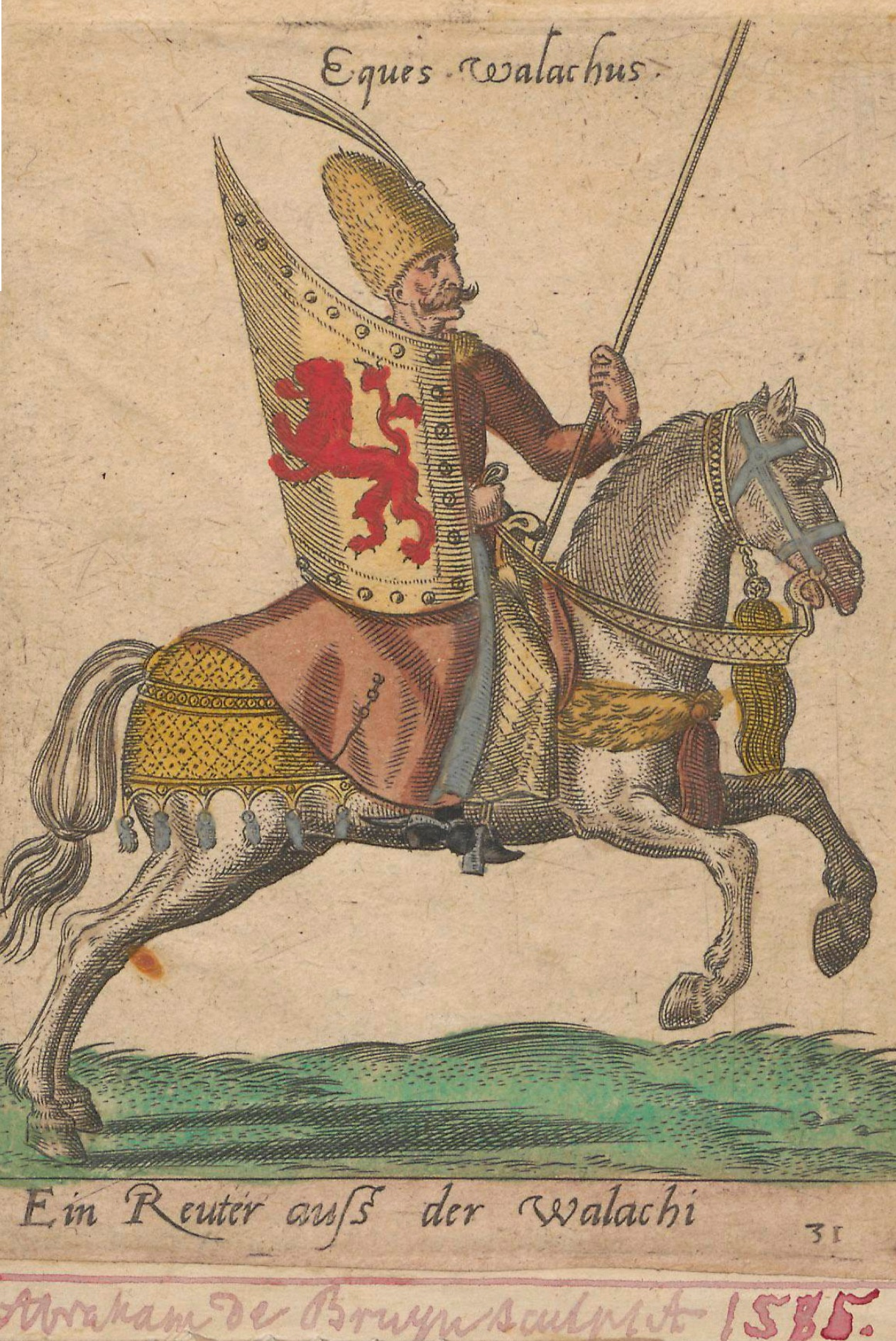
Wallachian horseman, as depicted by Abraham de Bruyn

Băleanu's absence from Suceava also led to a reemergence of the Movilă brothers Ieremia and Simion, who were backed by the Polish–Lithuanian Commonwealth—leading to one of the several, recurrent, Polish interventions in Moldavia. The poet Stanislaw Bartholan, who saw action with the Commonwealth army under Stanisław Żółkiewski, later claimed that Udrea (or Udra) was still in Moldavia with Deli-Marko, and only withdrew after Żółkiewski crossed the Dniester. Historian Constantin Rezachevici argues that this is merely a chronological error.

The Poles then moved into Wallachia, where they installed Simion Movilă as Prince. Băleanu, who still considered himself Moldavia's Hetman in diplomatic letters he sent to Żółkiewski, led the returning Wallachian loyalists into battle with the Poles. These were sent in to aid Michael and Novak, whose troops were defeated in a string of battles: at Năeni, Ceptura, and finally at Bucov. Udrea had the leading contribution to the stalling attempt of Năeni, where he commanded 4,000 from a total 7,000 Wallachians. His attempt to encircle Movilă's forces was thwarted by Moldavian boyars with accurate knowledge of the terrain. On November 25, 1600, a decisive clash occurred outside Curtea de Argeș. Udrea led four suicidal attacks into the Polish lines, losing some 1,500 men in all, but allowing Michael's main column the time to retreat.

According to historian Nicolae Bănică-Ologu, Băleanu was still free after the battle, joining Michael, Novak and the Buzescus one final time in Râmnicu Vâlcea. There, Michael is believed to have asked his Wallachian generals to save themselves by traveling back home and rendering fealty to Prince Simion. Captured by Starost Jan Potocki of Kamenets, Băleanu appealed to Prince Simion's forgiveness, promising to become his "servant and slave". In one of his messages from captivity, the Ban clarified that he was still hoping to preserve "my inheritance and my estate in this country [of Wallachia]". Several sources, including the chronicler Miron Costin and Rezachevici suggest that the prisoner had effectively betrayed Prince Michael. O.-G. Lecca argues differently, proposing that Băleanu remained loyal to the end of his life. Likewise, Bănică-Ologu sees Băleanu's action as a fulfillment of Michael's last order.

Ban Udrea was eventually handed over to the Movilăs by the Poles, though the latter still vouched for his safety. He was then nevertheless executed, on Simion's orders, at some point before July 1601—possibly in May, alongside his fellow Moldavian regent, the Spatharios Negrea. Lecca, who believes that Băleanu was more likely killed in 1600, records the method employed as a beheading. The same method is suggested by Holban, who dates the act to May 1601. This dating is contradicted by Nicolae Iorga, who notes that, in August 1601, Udrea was contributing to the Buzescus' revolt against Movilă, and that they even "managed to take hold of the country". Bănică-Ologu similarly believes that the Băleanu beheading took place months later. In his reading, Simion had allowed Negrea and Băleanu to walk free, but both had then rebelled against him with Michael's consent, which prompted severe retaliation; though the initial leaders did not survive, the revolt was embraced by Buzescu, who eventually managed to topple Simion.

The execution perplexed Simion's Polish partners, with Zamoyski complaining about the expediency of the procedure, carried out "with no trial and no form of justice". Udrea's fellow combatant, Novak, had returned to Transylvania and surrendered to Basta. Captured by the Hungarian nobles, he was tried, and then impaled, at Cluj (Kolozsvár). By the presumed moment of Băleanu's execution, Michael the Brave was in Cassovia, where Ferrante Gonzaga arranged his reconciliation with Basta and the resumption of the Holy League. There followed a return into Transylvania, which included a victory against Báthory at Guruslău. The march, involving troops commanded by Udrea's brother-in-law Leca of Cătun, ended in August 1601, when Michael was assassinated, on Basta's orders, at Câmpia Turzii. Of the two surviving Moldavian regents, Sava is known to have been captured and tortured.

== Legacy ==
Udrea Băleanu was most likely buried in his family's church at Nucet. With no children to survive him, Băleanu's estate went to furnishing his monastery in Gorgota, where he was buried. Panaghia's other ktitor was the Comis Leca. He achieved a dominant position as Spatharios under Radu Șerban, joining the latter in exile to Moldavia. Leca was then executed for treason and his estate was confiscated by a new Prince, Radu Mihnea. Grăjdana recovered possession of Leurdeni, which in the 18th century became property of the Manu boyars.

The Băleanu family still survived through collateral lines, including one represented by Ban Udrea's nephew, Ivașco I Băleanu. The latter was a prominent Wallachian courtier in the 1630s, having supported the successful pretender Matei Basarab. A similar role was played by his son, Gheorghe Băleanu, who fought alongside Constantin Șerban in Moldavia, in 1659, and then spent two years in Ottoman slavery. He is remembered as one of the leading actors in Wallachian politics throughout most of the 1660s and 1670s, when he presided over the political party which resisted the rise of Andronikos' family, the Cantacuzinos; that civil strife ended in 1679, with his son Ivașco II's expulsion.

This Băleanu branch also preserved the family's core estate, including the church of Băleni; rebuilt at several intervals, it has lost its original pisanie, which may have shown its links to Udrea. Its current ex-voto, dating back to the 18th and 19th centuries, depicts Udrea as one of the ktitors. Some historiographic confusion endured into the 20th century, caused by hypothetical readings by various historians. One of them, Bogdan Petriceicu Hasdeu, postulated that Udrea was the same as "Andrei the Monk", but later corrected this reading. Iorga was also accused by scholar N. I. Apostolescu of having misdated Udrea's will by some 50 years, leading him to invent another Udrea, who was alive in the 1650s. The Ban was recovered in Romanian literature, as a sidekick to Prince Michael. This subject was taken up by Dimitrie Bolintineanu in his 1851 attempt at an epic poem, where the Ban (called "Andrei") is shown taking Nikopol. Octav Dessila's historical drama, Mihai Viteazul, was performed in 1966 at Oradea National Theater, with George Pintilescu as Udrea. In the late 20th century, Mihnea Gheorghiu made Udrea appear in the play Capul ("The Head"); Puiu Burnea played him in the 1983 staging at Bacovia Theater of Bacău.
