= Marcu Cercel =

Prince of Moldavia
- Reign: July 23–September 4, 1600
- Predecessor: Michael the Brave (de facto)
- Successor: Ieremia Movilă
- Born: c. 1580
- Died: before 1629 (aged 35–50); Dezna?, Principality of Transylvania
- Spouse: unknown woman (before 1618); Druzsina Bogáthy (1620s)
- Issue: 1 daughter
- Dynasty: Drăculești?
- Father: Petru Cercel; Aaron the Tyrant (adoptive)
- Mother: Sultana (Stanca) Köprülü?
- Religion: Orthodox

Marcu Cercel, also known as Marco Cercel, Marcu-Vodă, or Marco-Voevod ("Marcu the Voivode"; Hungarian: Markó vajda, Italian: Marco Circelli; fl. 1580 – 1620), was a Wallachian adventurer who served as Prince of Moldavia in July–September 1600. His father, Petru Cercel, was Prince of Wallachia in the 1580s, and alleged son of Pătrașcu the Good. This probably meant that Marcu was a nephew of Michael the Brave, who in 1599–1601 managed to control Wallachia, Moldavia, and the Principality of Transylvania, making Marcu his representative or regional co-ruler. It is not precisely known who Marcu's mother was, but she was likely Albanian and related to the Köprülüs; she may be the same as Lady Stanca, who went on to marry Aaron the Tyrant, also Prince of Moldavia.

Marcu had his first military engagements in the 1600 war for Moldavia, when he was chased out by the Polish army. He fled to Transylvania before 1601, and, after Michael the Brave's killing, rallied with the Holy Roman Empire, which was fighting a Long War against the Ottoman Empire. By 1602, he was given a small command function in the Imperial Army, under Giorgio Basta, and saw action at Teișani, helping to defeat the Crimean Tatars. He then renounced plans to obtain the Wallachian throne, ceding it to another Habsburg favorite, Radu Șerban. His subsequent attempts to invade Moldavia from Transylvania were curbed by the Bocskai uprising, during which he also lost control over his Transylvanian estates. He lived for several years in Austrian Bohemia at the court of Sigismund Báthory.

In the 1610s, Cercel switched allegiances and became a favorite of Gabriel Bethlen; this rebel Prince of Transylvania also recommended him to the Ottomans. His final bid for the Moldavian throne ended in 1618, when Cercel settled in Transylvania. He lived to see the Bohemian Revolt and the Thirty Years' War, acting as Bethlen's agent in Prague. He was rewarded for results achieved during this mission, emerging as the owner of Dezna estate. He was twice married, the second time to Druzsina Bogáthy, who survived his death.

== Biography ==
=== Origins and childhood ===
Marcu was born at a time when Wallachia and Moldavia, the two Danubian Principalities, were tributary states of the Ottoman Empire, which had a growing influence on the appointment of local rulers. As a pretender, he traced his lineage to the ancient House of Basarab, through the branch known as Drăculești. This hinges on the claim of Pătrașcu the Good, his paternal grandfather, to have been the son of Radu Paisie. A Prince Marco, or Marcu, was Paisie's son and co-ruler. A letter from this "Io Marco voevod", although dated 1542, was read by historian Nicolae Iorga as a possible reference to the much younger Cercel. It is unclear what became of this historical figure: some authors hypothesize that he embraced Islam upon Paisie's downfall; others believe that he was in fact the same person as Pătrașcu. On at least occasion, Petru Cercel referred to himself as a grandson of Radu Paisie.

Among Pătrașcu's legitimate children, the first one to rule Wallachia was a Vintilă, who took the throne for only a few days in 1574. He and Petru Cercel were likely full brothers, both of them born to Pătrașcu's wife Voica, although scholar Ștefan Pascu argues that only Petru was Voica's son. The more famous Michael the Brave is widely believed to have been born from Prince Pătrașcu's marriage or affair with Teodora, making him Petru Cercel's half-brother and Marcu Cercel's uncle. This was backed by Michael himself, who in 1594 referred to Petru as "My Highness' brother". However, at least one account in English diplomatic records disputes Petru's background, alleging that, rather than Pătrașcu's son, he was a Greek from Morea.

Petru, who took the Wallachian throne in July 1583, had at least three sons, of whom Marcu is the best known. According to the eyewitness Franco Sivori of Genoa, all were born in 1583 from different mothers, none of whom was probably married to the Prince. Sivori claims that Marcu was the first-born, followed by Jonas or Ionașcu and Radulo or Radu (later re-baptized Petru). The latter is also attested in other documents, primarily as a bookish intellectual. Iorga and fellow historian Stoica Nicolaescu also list Marcu as having two brothers, but name them as Dumitrașco and Ștefan. Other scholars either dismiss both as impostors or view them as additional sons. Another disputed detail in Sivori is the date of birth. The chronicler Ciro Spontone similarly notes that Marcu was aged eighteen in September 1601, an account also backed by historian Constantin Rezachevici. Other scholarship, however, concludes that Marcu was probably born before his father's coronation.

Prince Petru was a pious Christian. He may have embraced Catholicism by 1581, or at least announced that he would, for opportunistic reasons. Some historians describe him as a Catholic committed to Counter-Reformation ideology, though one who also respected and protected the majority Wallachian Orthodox Church. Others see Petru as an Orthodox who remained friendly toward Catholicism and had Protestant missionaries burned at the stake. His behavior was otherwise incompatible with either Catholic or Orthodox norms. Ottoman sources of the period suggest that he was a polygamist, keeping three mistresses, all of whom were Turkish and Muslim apostates; this would also make Marcu, and possibly his two brothers as well, half-Turkish. As described by Rezachevici, Marcu was "the son of Petru Cercel and of a (baptized) Turkish wife, Sultana". One report of the period backs this account, describing Marcu as a "son" of the Köprülü family, therefore also Turko-Albanian. Petru Cercel may have also had an official wife, whose name is recorded as "Stanca", and who is sometimes identified as Marcu's mother. Whether or not she was another name for Sultana, or another Turkish wife, or simply Marcu's stepmother is uncertain, but all are viewed by historians as likely hypotheses.

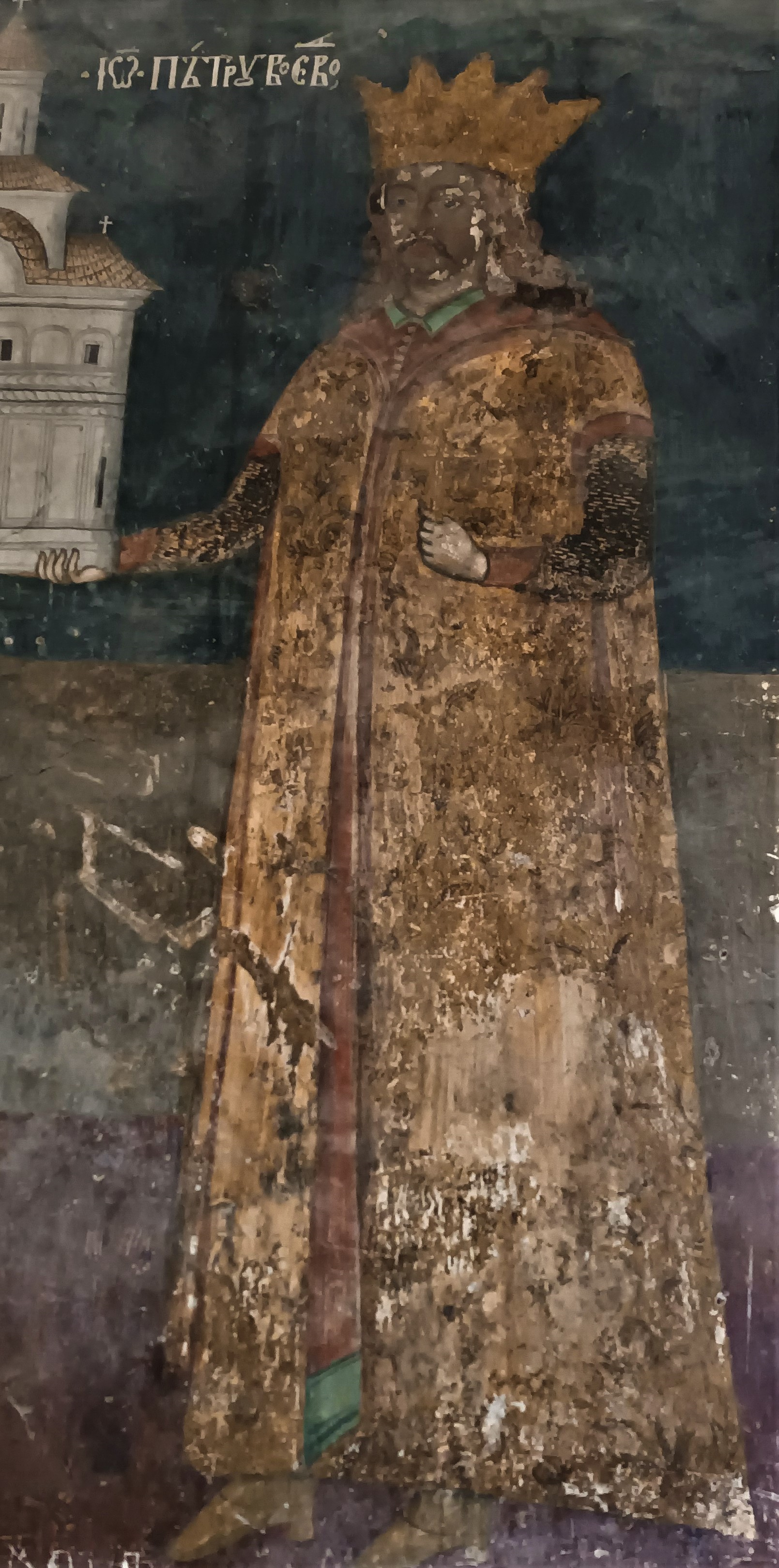
Prince Petru in Târgoviște's Princely Church (1690s fresco)

Iorga proposes that Marcu was named after Prince Marko, a semi-legendary hero of the anti-Ottoman struggle "for Christendom". His other name was his father's cognomen, meaning "Earring"—from Petru's distinguishing accessory. According to historian Maria-Venera Rădulescu, the heir-apparent must have spent his early years at the princely court in Târgoviște. She believes that a connected site in Cerbureni may preserve Marcu's only known portrait, done in terracotta by Italian artisans, and showing him as a young child. Marcu's first-ever mention is as a ktitor, or restorer, of Târgoviște's Princely Church, which was in fact a project of his father's. Rădulescu also distinguishes clues that Petru may have wanted his son to acquire a classical education. From his father, he received a manuscript of the Gospels, copied by Radu Grămăticul when he was in exile with Pătrașcu's family. A ledger at the Pontifical Greek College of Saint Athanasius in Rome suggests that a Marco Baiboda di Blachia ("Marco Voivode of Wallachia") was enlisted there in 1585, but also that he left soon after, refusing to take the pledge.

=== Orphan "princelet" ===
This period of his life ended later in 1585. The allegations surrounding Petru Cercel's amorous life and encouragement of apostasy produced a fatwa, and played a significant part in Sultan Murad III decision to shun his vassal. All known sons became outcast claimants following their father's removal. Petru Sr fled into the Principality of Transylvania, but was imprisoned there by Ottoman loyalists, and moved to the fortress of Huszth. Sivori notes that Marcu and Jonas followed their father, who obtained clemency for them. They subsequently joined the retinue of Ferenc II, the Count Kendi, who regarded them as "his own sons" and granted them domicile in Dátos (Dătășeni). Also according to Sivori, Marcu's brother Radu Petru was living in Istanbul as a protege of the French ambassadors. It is also certain that Stanca went on to remarry Aaron the Tyrant, who became Prince of Moldavia in 1591.

Pope Sixtus V obtained Prince Petru's release, allowing him to seek asylum in the Polish–Lithuanian Commonwealth. He also bribed the Ottoman authorities and arranged for his sons to still be recognized as valid candidates for the Wallachian throne. He then offered Jonas and Marcu as hostages to Poland, but escaped from prison as this offer was still being assessed. Still living at Dátos, Marcu received a multilingual education, being taught to read and write in Neo-Latin, Hungarian, and German. From March 1590, when Petru Cercel was killed at sea by the Ottomans, Marcu became his theoretical successor. Those years witnessed his uncle Michael the Brave's ascent through the ranks of Wallachian boyardom, and, in late 1593, his seizure of the Wallachian throne. In 1597, following Prince Aaron's death, Marcu and his (step)mother Stanca were reunited. They returned to Wallachia, possibly alongside Jonas, and were received at Michael's court. Spontone claims that Michael virtually adopted Marcu and intended to make him his son-in-law. By 1598, however, Cercel had promised to marry Gerolama, an Ottoman slave girl and niece of Agha Ömer, the influential eunuch.

Michael's anti-Ottoman rebellion, and his entry into the Long Turkish War as an ally of the Holy Roman Empire, also resulted in Wallachia's conquest of Transylvania (October 1599). Marcu's engagement to Gerolama ended abruptly, though he had already collected her dowry, making him a personal enemy of Ömer. His own career peaked in May 1600, with Michael's conquest of Moldavia. One report by the English Ambassador Henry Lello, written in March 1599, suggests that Marco may have been groomed to take over in Moldavia even before its conquest. The text notes that Michael wanted to secure Moldavia as a link with the Tsardom of Russia, having been promised 12,000 Don Cossacks. Shortly before embarking on the expedition, Michael was holding peace talks with the Ottomans. The titular Prince of Moldavia, Ieremia Movilă, observed these from a distance, concluding that Michael wanted him toppled. Also according to Ieremia, Michael's candidate was a "Greek relative of his", which, Rezachevici notes, was a false label for Cercel. During the same months, Michael also offered the Moldavian throne to a Ștefan Bogdan Sasul, orphaned son of Prince Iancu Sasul. After renouncing other plans to make his own son, Nicolae Pătrașcu, ruler of that country, Michael finally sent Marcu to Iași, preparing him for his coronation.

A regency council was eventually appointed, generally believed to have comprised Andronikos Kantakouzenos, Hetman Udrea Băleanu, Spatharios Negrea, and Armaș Sava. Several sources mention Marcu as a reigning Prince, before Ieremia could return with Polish backing—one of several Polish interventions in the region. According to Rezachevici, Michael's regime should be regarded as a dynastic union: Nicolae Pătrașcu was the Prince of Wallachia, Cercel ruled over Moldavia, while Michael was the claimant Prince of Transylvania and "higher point of reference" for the other two. The 18th-century record, Letopisețul Cantacuzinesc, argues that Marcu and Preda Buzescu arrived in Iași "and began to make merry" before being chased out by Ieremia; "and as happy as they were on their arriving, so were they ashamed to run back". A Moldavian writer, Miron Costin, notes that Marcu, or Marcul vodă, was "princelet" for "a short while", but also that his reign was entirely omitted in the succession lists.

Marcu's seal of 1607, featuring the Moldavian aurochs and the Wallachian bird

Rezachevici calculates the end dates of Marcu's reign as July 23 and September 4, 1600. Before being chased out of the country, he may have organized efforts to resist the Poles. An 18th-century author, Johann Filstich, records that Marcu commanded some of the Moldavian military forces, but was easily defeated by Stanisław Żółkiewski. This struggle may also have involved a Ragusan mercenary, Deli-Marko (Delmarco), with whom the Prince is sometimes confused (for instance, in the works of Ilie Bărbulescu). Some Ottoman sources of the period also refer to Cercel as Deli-Marco, translated by Iorga as "Marco the Brave".

=== Habsburg ally ===
The Poles also drove away Nicolae Pătrașcu from his throne in Wallachia, replacing him with Simion Movilă. In Transylvania, Michael's regime was destabilized by a revolt of the Hungarian nobility, which won backing from the Imperial general Giorgio Basta (see Battle of Mirăslău). Michael briefly reconciled with Basta, but was eventually assassinated by the latter at Câmpia Turzii, in September 1601. Marcu split with Michael's family and rallied with Basta, joining his quarters at Făgăraș Citadel. Basta's letters confirm his presence there on September 5, and also note that a delegation of Wallachian boyars wanted Marcu to become their Prince. This request appears to have been challenged by other boyars, who obtained recognition for a more experienced candidate, the former Paharnic Radu Șerban. During the interregnum, the Cercel brothers also became rivals: a son of Petru Cercel, identified by Pascu as being Radu Petru, was a Polish favorite for the Wallachian throne. Dumitrașco and Ștefan, who claimed to be Cercel's other sons, also made unsuccessful bids to the throne in that interval. The former was at the Polish court, competing for favors with Prince Simion, while Ștefan operated in Wallachia and among the outlaws of Temeşvar Eyalet.

By 1602, Marcu had turned his attention back on Moldavia. This implied using a heraldic seal with the Moldavian aurochs and the Wallachian bird, on Hungarian-language letters which he signed as Marko vaijvoda Moldvania (in Latin: Marcus Vayvoda C.czel). In March of that year, Polish King Sigismund Vasa received reports that Cercel was gathering a 10,000-strong army of Serb and Wallachian mercenaries, with which he planned to retake Iași. That April, he was with Basta and Radu Șerban at Sathmar. A delegation of Moldavian boyars, frightened by Ieremia's violent purges, asked Basta to recognize Marcu as their Prince. Their petition was endorsed by Radu Șerban, who thus expected to rid himself of Marcu. By May, Marcu had gathered 10,000 men for his planned expedition. Nevertheless, in June, a "Marchiò of Bogdania" was allegedly lodging in Istanbul with Ambassador Lello. As argued by Iorga, this account cannot refer to Cercel, but rather to his Moldavian rival, Ștefan Bogdan.

By September 1602, Marcu was known to be camped with the Imperial Army at Corona, where Radu Șerban was preparing the reconquest of Wallachia. Marcu assisted in this effort, commanding a guard unit of 3,000 Székelys and 1,000 Transylvanian pikemen. His troops defended Teișani from the Crimean Tatars, alongside forces led by Basta, Prince Radu and Stroe Buzescu. Finally, in January 1603, he led his force into Moldavia. Emperor Rudolf II received a letter from Prince Ieremia, who complained that Rudolf's Wallachian ally was causing damages across the border. Basta praised his skill in directing hajduk raids, during which Cercel collected various bounties, but in the end ordered him to return, fearing Polish reprisals. From 1604, he was faced with the Bocskai uprising in Transylvania and Upper Hungary, which cut him off from Moldavia. One record suggests that Marcu, alongside Count Dampierre, Boldizsár Kornis and Pongrác Sennyey, defended Szepesváralja (Spišské Podhradie) against troops led by the eponymous rebel leader, Stephen Bocskai.

Later in 1604, Cercel was stranded at Libochowitz, in Austrian Bohemia, a pensioner of the Aulic Council and member of Sigismund Báthory's retinue. He had lost control of his Transylvanian troops, who pledged themselves to Bocskai in 1605, and sought to ransack Feyérvár (Bălgrad). In 1606, Cercel was with Basta and Galeotto Barbiano di Belgiojoso at Cassovia, trying to uproot the Transylvanian occupation of that city. By 1608, Marcu was in Prague, and, Iorga notes, was regarded as a "second Michael". He was also poised to take the Moldavian throne from Constantin Movilă, but Radu Șerban intervened before this could happen, and put up Mihail Movilă on the throne.

Marcu's estranged cousin and competitor, Nicolae Pătrașcu, also settled in the Habsburg lands, but not before attempting to seize Wallachia from Radu Șerban. He was reportedly captured and mutilated during the events. Of Marcu's other surviving relatives, Stanca Cercel was Radu Șerban's guest in Wallachia—Matthias of Austria tried to arrange a safe conduct for Marcu's servants to meet with her. Meanwhile, Bocskai was proclaimed Prince of Transylvania and confiscated all of Marcu's assets, including an estate at Alsóidecs (Ideciu). In May 1607, a new Prince, Sigismund Rákóczi, also confiscated Cercel's townhouse in Feyérvár. According to Iorga, this meant that Cercel was living in misery. Rudolf considered him for a Captaincy of the Hungarian Kingdom, but none were yet available.

=== With Bethlen ===
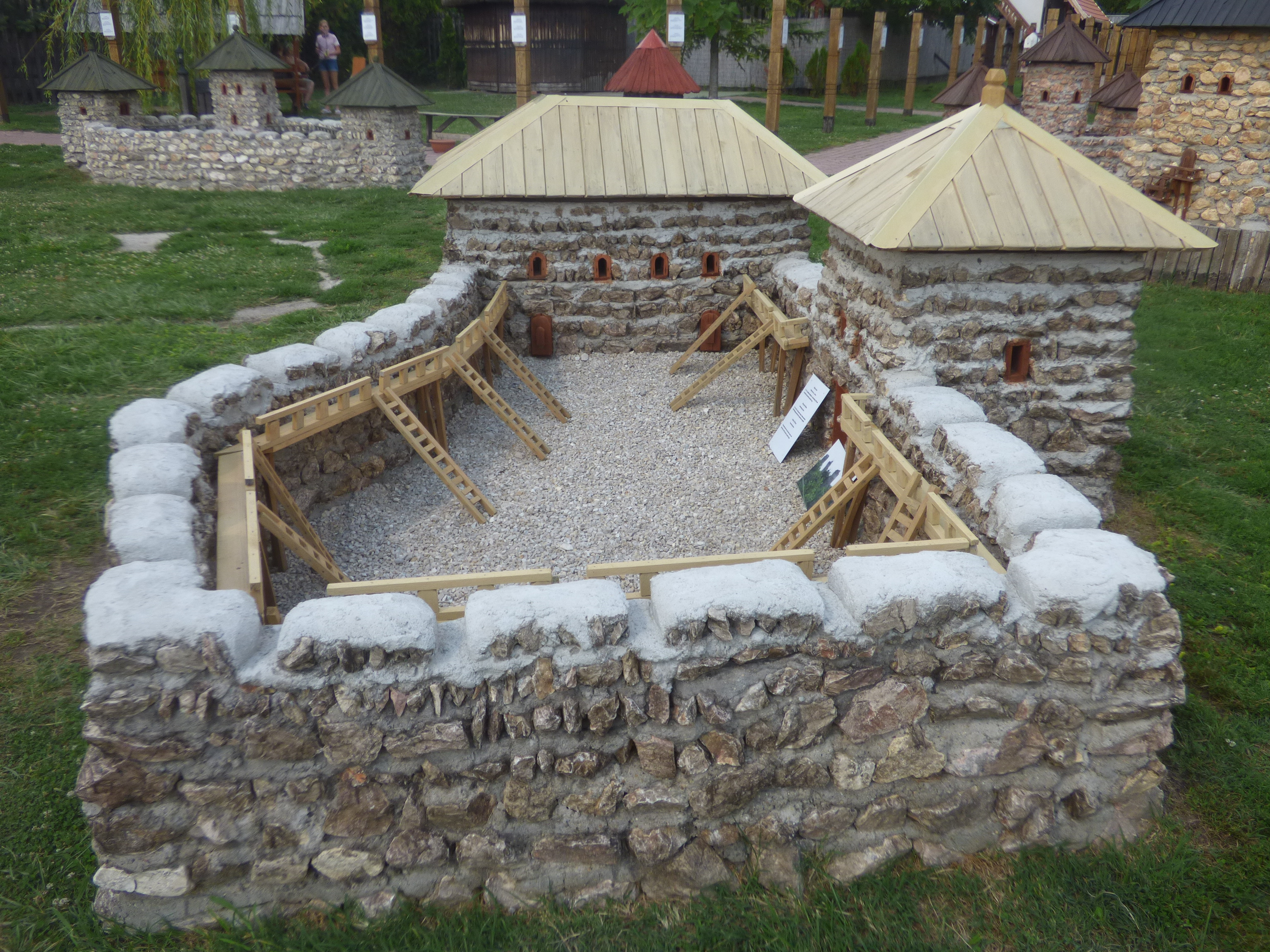
Mockup of Cercel's castle in Dezna, from a 2018 display

In February 1610, Rudolf ordered Marcu's arrest, having been informed that the Wallachian was involved in a conspiracy. This plot would have made Báthory King of Hungary and place the rump kingdom, alongside Transylvania, in the Ottoman camp. Released in March, after undergoing interrogations, Marcu was financially destitute. In July, he petitioned György Thurzó, the Hungarian Palatine, listing his services to the Hungarian nation and demanding to be granted an administrative office, with pay. His request was left unanswered in 1612, when he addressed new complaints to Matthias, who had since been crowned Emperor. In early 1613, he was involved again on the front against Báthory, asking Matthias to make him commander of the loyalist Transylvanian corps, which had been left leaderless by the death of Lajos Rákóczi. Taking over as Prince of Transylvania in October, Gabriel Bethlen informed his Ottoman allies that Matthias wanted Cercel to take the Moldavian crown. According to Bethlen, this was a conspiracy also involving Radu Șerban and Gáspár Bekes.

Nevertheless, the records of Schäßburg show that Marcu was bribing the Ottoman envoy Iskender Pasha and his son, hoping to obtain their goodwill. In 1616, during a new war in Moldavia, he joined Bethlen's mercenary squads. This marked the beginning of Marcu's push into the new anti-Habsburg camp, consolidated by Bethlen. Marcu moved to Transylvania with his mother, his wife (who was dead by 1618), and a daughter. According to notes left by Transylvanian aristocrat John Kemény, he was initially a resident of Csúcs, and engaged in a struggle with Kemény over ownership of the church in Gerend (Grind). In 1617, Bethlen officially presented him as his choice for Prince in either Moldavia or Wallachia, and expressed hopes that the Ottomans would endorse him. The following year, with Bethlen's tacit support, Lupu Mehedințeanu staged a rebellion against Wallachia's Alexander IV. This presented an opportunity for Cercel, but Bethlen hesitated between him and Simion's son, Gabriel Movilă.

Also in 1618, Marcu traveled to Istanbul, where he hoped to obtain the favors of Osman II against the same Movilă. His family situation and issues concerning his estate finally drove him back to Transylvania. By 1619, Bethlen's involvement in the Thirty Years' War had pushed him back into political life. Various reports note that Cercel managed Transylvanian and Ottoman participation in the Bohemian Revolt. According to István Szamosközy, Marcu arrived in Prague as early as July 1618, and even obtained from the rebels promises that they would make Bethlen ruler of the Czech lands. In discussions with Marcu, the Prince of Thurn pledged 100,000 scudi to the Transylvanians, in exchange for their opening a new front against the Habsburgs. Instead, imperials counted on support from two deposed Wallachian Princes. Now allies, Nicolae Pătrașcu and Radu Șerban similarly negotiated payment for a Polish intervention against Transylvania.

Cercel's services were rewarded by Bethlen: in August 1619, Marcu received the citadel and estate of Dezna, in Zaránd County; in October, while he was still away, Stanca was granted provisional ownership of Sóspatak (Șeușa) by its lord, the Canon Debreczeni. Little is known about the former Prince after his return to Transylvania, other than that he married a second time, to the aristocrat Druzsina (or Druzsiána) Bogáthy. His death occurred at some point before 1629, when Druzsina is mentioned as the recipient of a widow's pension, also granted by Bethlen. Kemény reports, with a dose of uncertainty ("as I remember it"), that Marcu and his daughter were guests at his wedding, which took place in Halmi (Halmeu) on June 14, 1632.

Druzsina inherited Dezna, and lived there until 1656. Cercel's surviving brother, Radu Petru, apparently made a final attempt to become Prince in 1611. Before 1620, he was supporting another one of Wallachia's intermittent rulers, Radu Mihnea, who made him an adjunct Postelnic and owner of Belizvor estate, in Mehedinți County. Radu Petru also took control of Odobești village, which he claimed was his father's purchase, but lost it under Alexander IV, who reassigned Odobești to Matei Basarab. Radu Petru took monastic orders in 1629, renaming himself Partenie. He was still alive to at least 1634. However, some records of the 1620s show that another Wallachian claimant by the name of Petru was living in Russia, and was also known there by the patronymic Petrov. As noted by scholar Matei Cazacu, his alleged father "could only have been Petru Cercel". In the late 1860s, Mihai Eminescu began, but never finished, a romantic play which depicts a "Marcu Voivode" (wrongly credited as Michael the Brave's son). This project was titled Mira, for its female protagonist—the fictional, insane daughter of Prince Ieremia. Posthumous portrayals of Marcu include Constantin Vaeni's 1977 film, Buzduganul cu trei peceți—as noted by critic Eva Sîrbu, he is portrayed by Andrei Finți as a man of "impulsive youth and clean devotion".
