= Andronikos Kantakouzenos (1553–1601) =

Greek Ottoman private banker and Wallachian statesman

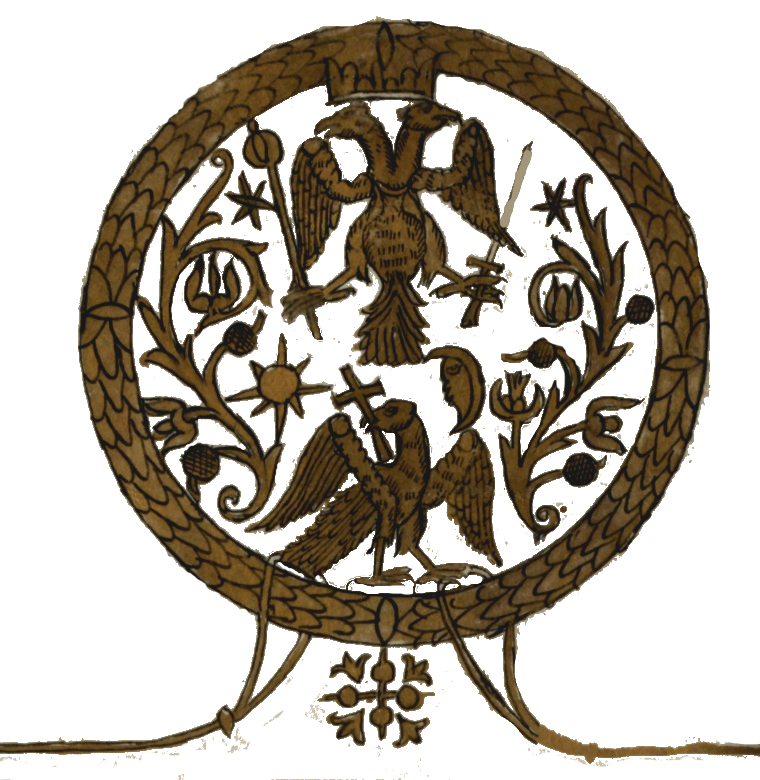
- Cantacuzino family emblem with the coat of arms of Wallachia, as used by Andronikos' grandson Șerban Cantacuzino

Ban of Oltenia
- In office November 1592 – May 1594

Co-regent of Moldavia
- In office May – July 1600

Personal details
- Born: 1553
- Died: late 1601 (aged 48) Moldavia
- Spouse(s): Irene Rhali; Maria Hrisoscoleu?
- Relations: Michael Kantakouzenos Şeytanoğlu (father); Teodora (Tudora) (sister?); Iane Kantakouzenos (uncle?); Michael the Brave (nephew?); Nicolae Pătrașcu (grandnephew?); Dumitrache Chiriță Paleologul (cousin); Constantin II Cantacuzino (grandson); Mihai Cantacuzino (grandson); Șerban Cantacuzino (grandson)
- Children: Constantin I Cantacuzino; Thomas Kantakouzenos; Iordaki Kantakouzenos; 2 daughters

Andronikos Kantakouzenos (Greek: Ανδρόνικος Καντακουζηνός or Ανδρόνικος Βηστιάρης, Andronikos Vistiaris; Latin: Andronicus Cantacuzenus; Romanian: Andronic or Andronie Cantacuzino; 1553 – late 1601), also known as Mihaloğlu Derviş, was an Ottoman Greek entrepreneur and political figure, primarily active in Wallachia and Moldavia. He was the son of Michael Kantakouzenos Şeytanoğlu, a powerful merchant of the Ottoman Empire, executed by Murad III in 1578. Forced to honor his father's outstanding debt, and briefly imprisoned as a galley slave, he rebuilt the fortune through commerce and political intrigues. In the 1590s, he was continuing his father's involvement as kingmaker for both Wallachia and Moldavia, acting as patron for a succession of Hospodars: Stephen the Deaf, Petru Cercel, Aaron the Tyrant and Peter the Lame all benefited from his financing. From 1591, he involved himself directly in the administration of both countries. Integrated within Moldo–Wallachian boyardom, he was Vistier, and then the first-ever Ban of Oltenia to be appointed directly by the Ottomans.

Andronikos' final choice as Wallachian Prince, Michael the Brave, was also his most enduring, allowing Wallachia to rebel against Ottoman suzerainty. The uprising ended up absorbing Kantakouzenos, who escaped an Ottoman death sentence and settled in Wallachia with his wife, Irene Rhali. He went on to serve Michael as Ban, Vistier, and Postelnic. At the climax of the Long Turkish War, Kantakouzenos oversaw the diplomatic actions which formalized Wallachia's alliance with the Holy Roman Empire and the Holy League. During Michael's conquest of Transylvania, he remained behind in Bucharest to assist the heir apparent, Nicolae Pătrașcu. A prevailing opinion among historians also identifies Andronikos as one of four regents of Moldavia, following that country's annexation by Michael, in mid 1600. Later that year, as Michael's Holy League alliance began to unravel, Andronikos proposed a separate peace with the Ottoman Empire. He was sent to Giurgiu to negotiate it, but was kidnapped by the Ottomans and disappeared from records. He was killed at the latest in November 1601, presumably decapitated in Moldavia.

Andronikos is the patriarch of the Cantacuzino family: its branch in Wallachia was established by his son Constantin I, with Constantin's brothers settling in Moldavia. Intermarried with local aristocrats, these branches feuded with each other and with other families, rising to prominence later in the 17th century. Andronikos' grandson, Șerban, served as Prince of Wallachia and Moldavia, while a great-grandson, Dumitrașcu, was Prince of Moldavia. Another great-grandson, Ștefan Cantacuzino, was Wallachia's last Prince of the pre-Phanariote era, executed by the Ottomans alongside his father Constantin II. From that stage on, the family survived as one of the leading components of a "national party", which fought against Greek and Phanariote influence.

== Biography ==
=== Origins and early life ===
Andronikos' father was Michael Kantakouzenos, commonly known by the nickname Şeytanoğlu ("Son of Satan"). This market speculator, mine owner, and tax farmer also pioneered the family's kingmaking practices in the Danubian Principalities—historian Neagu Djuvara argues that the Princes of Wallachia and of Moldavia were effectively clients of this "immeasurably wealthy" entrepreneur. The 1570s chronicler Stephan Gerlach even suggested that Şeytanoğlu was the actual "lord of Wallachia and Bogdania". In addition to controlling the two counties politically, Michael "is reported to have controlled almost all the salt trade in Wallachia and Moldavia."

Şeytanoğlu regarded himself as an heir to the Kantakouzenos, one of the most prominent aristocratic clans in the late Byzantine Empire. This lineage is often described as spurious by both early observers and modern historians. Some researchers have nevertheless endorsed the genealogical claim, leading back to the 14th-century Emperor John VI. Several of these authors agree that Şeytanoğlu's great-grandfather was George "Sachatai", who was in turn the great-grandson of John VI. Overall, historian Tom Papademetriou argues, the reconstruction of this genealogy remains "difficult", with no trustworthy indication of who Şeytanoğlu's father was. Some period sources do however describe Andronikos' other ancestors and relations. A number of records mention that Şeytanoğlu was closely related with a Muslim Kantakouzenos, the scribe Ahmed, who succeeded İbrahim Peçevi as defterdar of the Danube. The family also had a branch claiming to be Palaiologoi, of whom Constantine was Şeytanoğlu's alleged nephew. Şeytanoğlu, Andronikos, and other figures from both branches of the family used seals marked with the double-headed eagle, deriving from Byzantine imperial usage.

According to various readings, the Greek man known as "Iane", "Iani" or "Ianiu", probably involved in Wallachian politics from as early as the 1550s, under Prince Pătrașcu the Good, may have also been a Kantakouzenos. This Iane probably served as Vistier (treasurer) of Moldavia under John the Terrible, then moved to Wallachia with Mihnea Turcitul and became Ban of Oltenia. The same Iane was then sent back to Istanbul as diplomatic envoy of both principalities, which allowed him a great say in the appointment of Princes and court dignitaries. Genealogist Ioan C. Filitti argues against identifying Ban Iane with the Kantakouzenos, describing him as a commoner from Zagori. However, according to historian Radu Ștefan Vergatti, Iane was Şeytanoğlu's brother and Andronic's uncle. The writer Constantine Dapontes apparently suggests that Iane was Andronikos' older brother, but this descriptor is viewed as inaccurate by scholar Nicolae Iorga. The latter hypothesizes that Iane was brothers with Michael, but notes that his origins are overall "more doubtful". Genealogist Constantin Gane takes an intermediate position, arguing that Iane of Zagori was mistaken for Şeytanoğlu' real brother, John; according to Gane, both Iane and John served as Bans, at very close intervals.

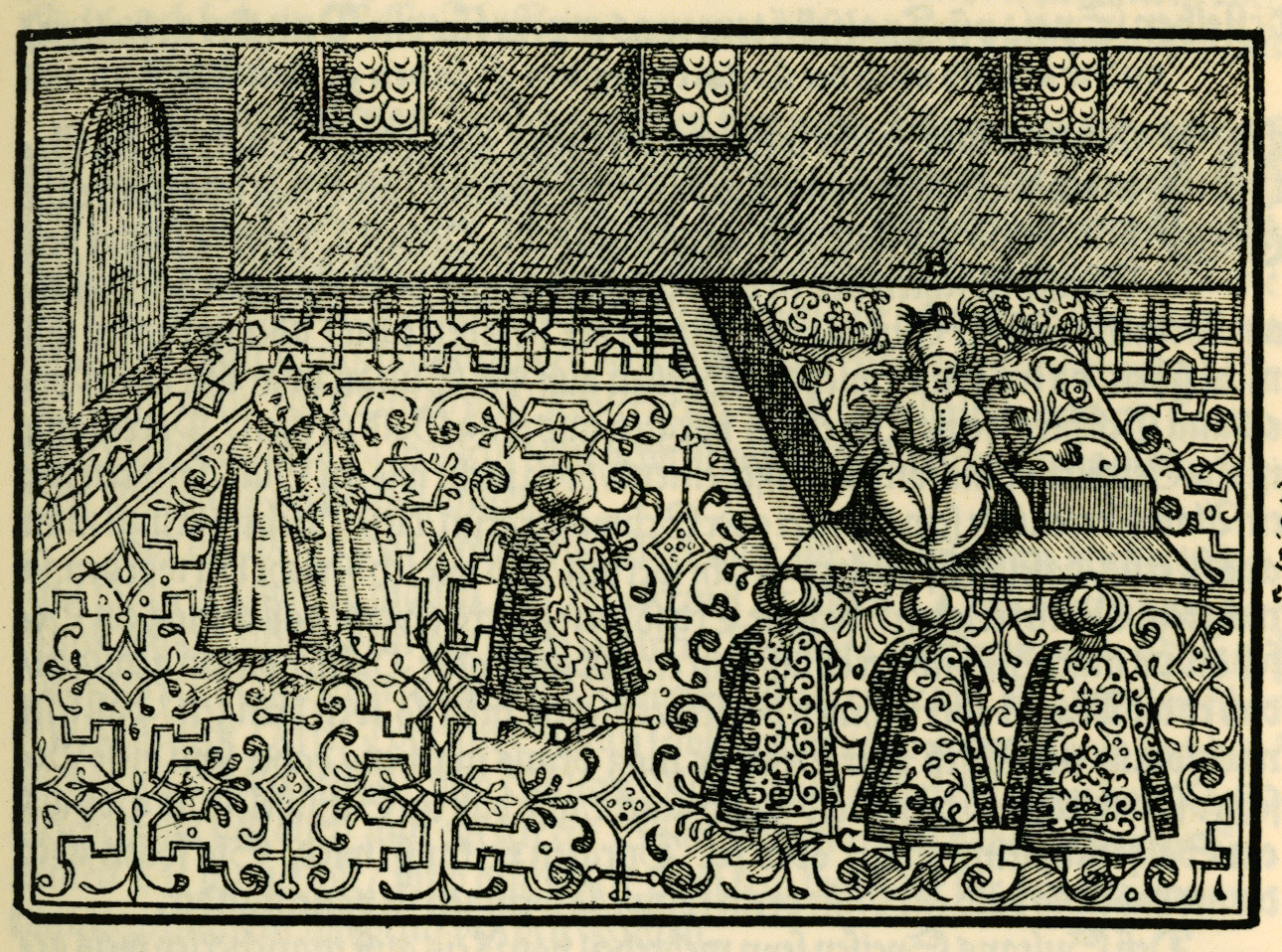
Murad III receiving ambassadors from the Holy Roman Empire. 1608 engraving to Salomon Schweigger's account of the visit

Andronikos was born from Şeytanoğlu's first marriage. His stepmother, a Romanian, was either the daughter of Mircea Ciobanul and Doamna Chiajna or, contrarily, of Mircea III Dracul. Andronikos was the one of several children: Şeytanoğlu had two other much younger sons, Demetrios (born 1566) and John (born 1570), and at least two daughters, one of whom was Andronikos' senior. The recipient of a classical education at his father's palace in Anhialo, Andronikos learned to speak and write in Greek, Italian, German, Neo-Latin, and Ottoman Turkish. During his son's early years, Şeytanoğlu pursued a political alliance with the Rhali merchants, marrying Andronikos' elder sister to one member of that family, setting her a dowry at 40,000 ducats. Another sister reinforced the family's genealogical claims by marrying Anthony Kantakouzenos, a merchant from the Crimean Khanate. In 1576, Şeytanoğlu oversaw the marriage between Andronikos and Irene, daughter of the merchant Jacob Rhali from Edirne.

=== Persecution and return ===
The lavish wedding itself may have played a part in Şeytanoğlu's downfall, contributing to his arrest for tax evasion, during which he was shown to be involved in an anti-Ottoman intrigue. One theory, advanced by scholar Matei Cazacu, is that Sultan Murad III had discovered Kantakouzenos' sponsorship of Ioan Potcoavă, who wanted to take Moldavia out of the Ottomans' orbit. Andronikos was also imprisoned, then, in March 1578, was forced to watch as his father was hanged at Anhialo. He escaped more serious punishment by taking flight across the Black Sea to Istanbul, where he asked and obtained protection from Şeytanoğlu's friend Sokollu Mehmed Pasha, the Grand Vizier. He was detained as a galley slave for the Ottoman Navy, but Sokollu released him after some weeks of servitude, with Andronikos promising to liquidate his father's debts. The persecutions also fell on the "Palaiologoi" branch of the Kantakouzenos, with Constantine fleeing for safety to the Crimean Khanate.

From about 1585, Andronikos rebuilt his father's business ventures and resumed contacts with traders from the Republic of Venice and from all over Lombardy; like Iane, he also became involved in the lucrative business of princely appointments in Wallachia. In various records, he is credited with having obtained in 1591–1592 the Wallachian throne for the Moldavian Stephen the Deaf. He himself was Prince Stephen's Vistier from June 1, 1591, to May 28, 1592, and again in July 1592. According to Iorga, he exercised this task without actually being present in Wallachia. Several researchers, including Iorga, note that one of Andronikos' daughters probably became Stephen's wife. According to Iorga, that lady may have actually wed another pretender, Petru Cercel, while her sister was more certainly the wife of Moldavia's Aaron the Tyrant. Any such connection is disputed by Cazacu, who notes that Iorga mistranslated a letter by Andronikos: what Iorga read as a reference to his "grandchildren" from both Princes was in fact translatable as "servants".

More far-reaching was the Kantakouzenos' involvement in promoting the career of Michael the Brave, who had served as Ban of Oltenia. Possibly appointed to this office by Iane himself, in or around 1590, Michael was in open conflict with Prince Alexander the Wicked after 1593, and, according to legend, miraculously escaped execution. The Kantakouzenos, and especially Andronikos, were instrumental in obtaining him the Wallachian throne. This includes collecting 400,000 ducats (45 million USD in 1995) from the various creditors of Istanbul, a loan which Michael had paid up in September 1593. One of Andronikos' letters to a Moldavian favorite, Peter the Lame, states that the Kantakouzenos viewed Michael as the only viable candidate "of all those other sinners [and] cunning beys". Kantakouzenos also takes pride in noting that Wallachians "thanked God" and "blessed my late parents" for his selection of "such a good shepherd, such a good Christian" as Michael. According to Iorga, the sponsor implicitly scolded Peter, but still kept him as his reserve option for the Moldavian throne against Aaron. As Vergatti notes, such musings also indicate that Andronikos expected a high return on his original investment, and was already expecting Michael to reappoint him as Vistier.

A dispute endures among historians as to whether Michael and Andronikos were family: an Italian source from ca. 1600 refers to Andronikos as "parent of the Voivode". Later scholarship identifies Michael's mother, Teodora (Tudora), as a sister of Andronikos, and the lover or wife of Pătrașcu the Good. Other deductions rely on the identification of Iane as a Kantakouzenos. Some sources of the period depict Iane as Michael's maternal uncle or father; various testimonies also allege that in 1590 he helped physically eliminate Cercel, who was reportedly Michael's half-brother. According to Gane, Michael and Iane were nephew and uncle, but neither was a Kantakouzenos.

=== Wallachian revolt ===
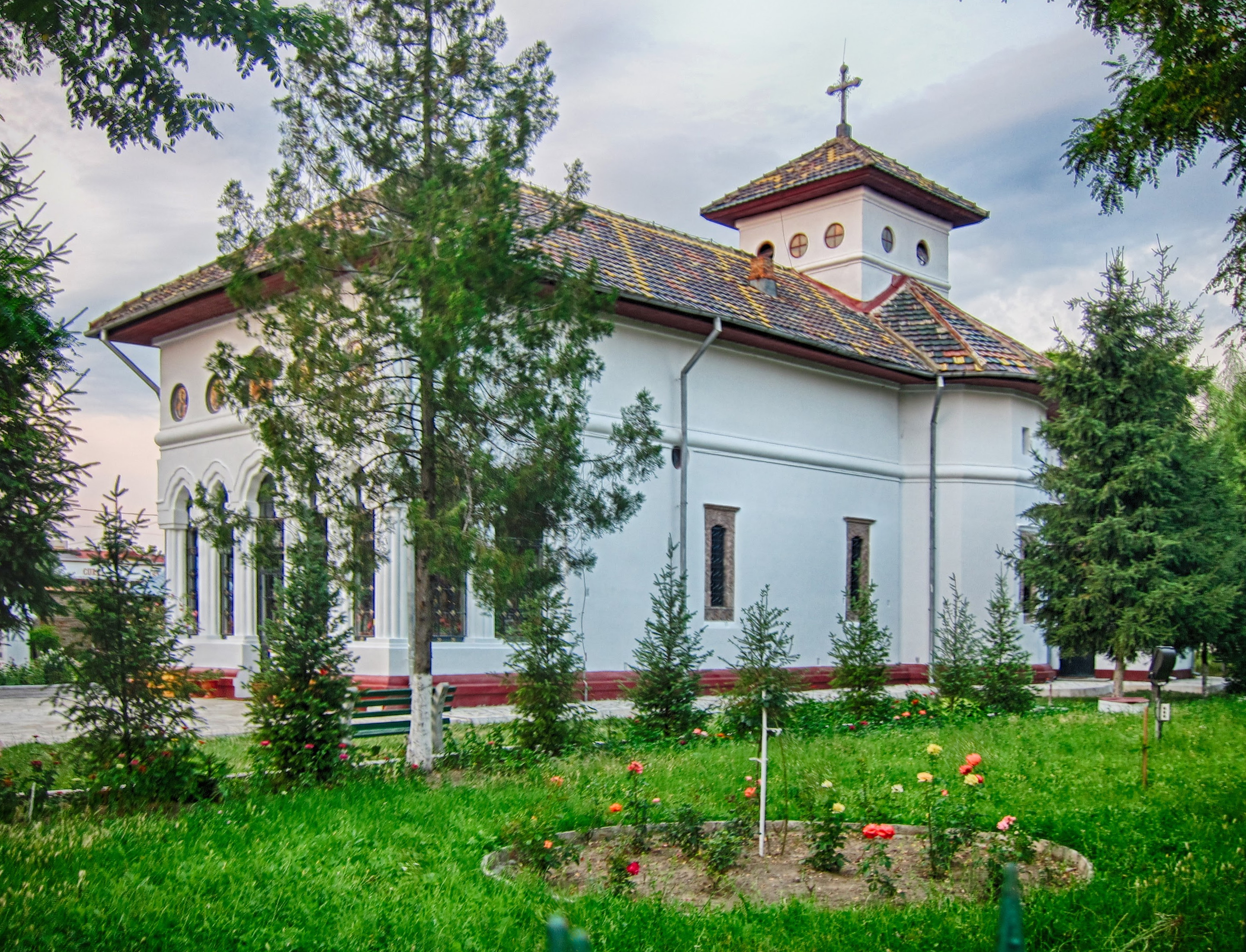
Banului Church, built by Kantakouzenos in Buzău

As noted by Cazacu, Kantakouzenos again took a Wallachian boyar's title in November 1592, when a firman of the Sublime Porte imposed him as Ban of Oltenia, under Alexander the Wicked; he was simultaneously a Ban of Moldavia, under Aaron. He was the first-ever Ban to be appointed directly by a Sultan, showing both the "tight[ening] of Ottoman control" and Andronikos' "enormous prestige". Various Turkish records of ca. 1592 refer to Andronikos as Mihaloğlu Derviş ("The Dervish Son of Michael"), which may indicate that he was a widower, or had separated from Irene and had withdrawn into contemplative life. These may also be supported up by a later mention of an "Andrew the Monk", former Ban of Oltenia. Known locally as Andronie, Kantakouzenos was a patron of the Byzantine Patriarchate and the Wallachian Church, noted as the ktitor of Banului Church, Buzău. Before May 1592, he had also founded an adjacent monastery called Dușca, which he had dedicated to the Greek monks of Dousiko. Researcher Dimitrie Gh. Ionescu notes that, throughout Andronikos' life, the establishment was only a small metochion served by two monks. It served to administer the local estate, including mills donated by Michael and villages pushed into serfdom in "dubious circumstances, tolerated by the prince." In time, Dușca became the town's second-most important religious institution, after the local bishopric.

On November 10, 1593, in Bucharest, Prince Michael reconfirmed Andronikos as Oltenia's Ban; the appointee may have also served as Vistier, possibly concomitantly, before May 1594. At this stage, Michael was preparing the ground for an anti-Ottoman uprising, and stopped honoring his remaining debts. Andronikos was probably caught by the events in Istanbul, where he was singled out for having supported the rebel Prince, and swiftly imprisoned in summer 1594. In November, Michael entered the Long Turkish War, aligning himself with the Holy League against his Ottoman overlords. Andronikos was sentenced to death, but managed to bribe his way out of prison, and then escaped to Wallachia.

Some records suggest that Iane was dead by then, while others note that he parted company with Michael and the Kantakouzenos. For fear of repercussion, he and his son Apostolos embraced Islam, which disqualified them from owning land in the two principalities. Among Andronikos' in-laws, Dionysus Rallis, the Bishop of Tarnovo, coordinated the Bulgarian Uprising of 1598, then escaped to Wallachia and also joined Michael's court. According to Cazacu, Andronikos and Dionysus were co-conspirators in a project to restore the Byzantine Empire with a revolution in the Balkans at large.

After returning to Michael's court, Andronikos became one of eight most prominent boyars, all of them full members of the Boyar Council, serving for a while as the chief diplomat, or Postelnic. He was involved in formalizing the alliance between Wallachia and the Holy Roman Empire, signed into a treaty at Târgoviște, on June 9, 1598, as well as negotiating a league with the Principality of Transylvania, on June 26, 1599. While consolidating his political position, Andronikos also concentrated on increasing his Wallachian estate, purchasing property in Buzău County. As read by Cazacu and Emanoil Hagi-Moscu, period documents suggest that he had remarried, possibly to a Maria Hrisoscoleu. His son, Constantin I, was reportedly born ca. 1598, probably at Andronikos' main residence in Târgoviște. By then, Andronikos also had two other sons, Thomas and Iordaki.

=== Regency and disappearance ===
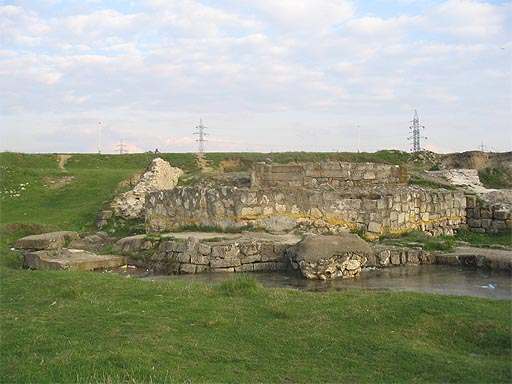
Remains of Giurgiu citadel, where Kantakouzenos was kidnapped during the negotiations of 1600

In autumn 1599, Michael invaded and took Transylvania, ending the pro-Ottoman regime established there by Prince Andrew Báthory. During this venture, and into early 1600, Andronikos assisted Michael's son Nicolae Pătrașcu, who had been left behind as co-ruler of Wallachia. Recorded by sources as Nicolae's tutor, he also returned to his office of Vistier, which he held between December 28, 1599, and July 9, 1600. One notice by the Ragusan spy Paolo Giorgio suggests that he now endorsed signing a peace with the Ottomans. In parallel, by May, Michael had extended his control over Moldavia, toppling the latter's Prince, Ieremia Movilă, and installing a regency. Ultimately, the Moldavian throne was to be assigned to a junior relative of Michael's, Marcu Cercel, who never managed to take possession of it.

That war further divided Kantakouzenos' clan: the "Palaiologoi" branch, represented by Dumitrache Chiriță, remained allies and in-laws with Prince Ieremia, following him in exile. Instead, Bishop Dionysus was again present on Michael's side, taking over as Metropolitan of Moldavia. An Andronic vistier, generally identified with Kantakouzenos, is mentioned as one of the co-regents, alongside Ban Udrea Băleanu, Spatharios Negrea, and Armaș Sava. The consensus was not endorsed by I. Ionașcu, who believes that Andronic and Andronikos were different persons.

By September 1600, Michael was caught in a Transylvanian civil war, pitting him against the imperial general Giorgio Basta and the local Hungarian nobility; Moldavia was also invaded by the Polish–Lithuanian Commonwealth—one of the several Polish interventions in Moldavia. The situation prompted Wallachian attempts to sign a separate peace with the Ottomans: Andonikos, who voted in favor of the armistice, was dispatched for this purpose to Giurgiu. Upon arrival, he was kidnapped by Serasker Mehmed.

Within two months, Wallachia was occupied by the Commonwealth army, and Simion Movilă took the throne. This Movilești regime, which had Dumitrache Chiriță as one of its central figures, faced a loyalist rebellion. During its final stages, Simion executed the former Moldavian regents, Udrea and Negrea. By then, Michael had secured imperial support, and again controlled parts of Transylvania after the battle of Guruslău. His attempted return to Wallachia was cut short by Basta, whose soldiers assassinated the Prince at Câmpia Turzii. During the subsequent confusion, imperial envoys sought to reconnect with their Wallachian partisans; in September 1601, German diplomatic records still discuss attempts to approach Andonikos, apparently unaware of his capture.

Andronikos' ultimate fate is uncertain, with details furnished by some late and conflicting accounts. The 18th-century Moldavian Prince Mihai Racoviță recalled hearing that Andronikos had been executed at Istanbul, after refusing to affirm Islam, which would have saved his life; this account was partly backed by another Prince, Dimitrie Cantemir, who nevertheless suggests, anomalously, that Andonikos was dead in 1595. Reportedly, a 17th-century Ukrainian church official contradicted such stories. This source alleges that Andronikos was again able to escape from custody, trying to make his way to Vienna, but was apprehended and killed at an undisclosed location. One other record, dated July 24, 1601, refers to a "Greek man who was the heart and soul of Prince Michael" being captured by pro-Ottoman Transylvanians in Beszterce (Bistrița). Cazacu reads this is a reference to Andronikos, who was then handed over to Moldavian envoys, and decapitated in Moldavia by Simion Movilă, "in October–November 1601". A Spanish chronicle apparently corroborates these accounts, noting that Simion dispatched the head of "a certain Andronic the Greek" to Istanbul, where it was received by the Sublime Porte on November 4, 1601.

== Legacy ==
One document of the period suggests that Andronikos was survived by five young children, whom he sent to live with an aunt in the Kingdom of Candia. Andronikos' three known sons returned to the principalities in subsequent decades, ultimately establishing a Romanianized Cantacuzino family. Constantin I was the progenitor of its Wallachian branch; Thomas and Iordaki are the two Cantacuzino patriarchs in Moldavia. From Constantin's marriage to Elina Șerban, daughter of Movilă's vanquisher Radu Șerban, the Wallachian Cantacuzinos were matrilineal descendants of the Basarab dynasty. Their alleged cousin Apostolos also made a brief return to Wallachia in the 1630s, as a backer of Prince Leon Tomșa. Though publicly known under his Muslim name, Kürt Salman Çavuş, he donated his father's Gypsy slaves to Radu Vodă Monastery. One reading, by historian Michał Wasucionek, suggests that he had in fact reverted to Christianity.

Wallachia's main Cantacuzino branches reached prominence under Leon's enemy and successor, Matei Basarab, and maintained it for decades: all of Constantin's sons, including Drăghici and Șerban, had terms as high dignitaries. This performance was never again matched in Wallachian history. Andronikos' accumulation of land around Buzău was carried on by one of these posthumous grandsons, the Spatharios Mihai, who was reportedly the richest Cantacuzino before 1700. His son Dumitrașcu briefly ruled Moldavia during the 1670s, his reign ending a conflict between the Moldavian and Wallachian branches of the family. At the time, the Cantacuzino legacy in Moldavia was also represented by the writer and Hetman Ion Neculce, Andronikos' great-grandson through his mother, Catrina "Muta" Cantacuzino.

From December 1663, when Grigore I Ghica ordered Constantin I's execution at Snagov Monastery, the Wallachian Cantacuzinos were also at the center of a latent civil war, opposing them to the descendants of Andonikos' co-regent, Udrea Băleanu. The Cantacuzino program was partly fulfilled in the 1680s, when Șerban reigned as Prince. However, Cantemir and other early historians claim that he was killed by his own brothers, who resented his attempts to realign Wallachia with the Holy Roman Empire. The renewed conflict also involved on the Cantacuzino side the Craiovești: their leader, Constantin Brâncoveanu, was Andronikos' great-grandson on his mother's side. The family returned to favor under Brâncoveanu's reign, which ended with a reassertion of Ottoman control, and the Prince's execution, following the Pruth River Campaign. The attempt to create a Cantacuzino dynasty with Habsburg assistance ended abruptly during the war of 1716, when Șerban's son Gheorghe was only made Ban of occupied Oltenia. At the time a reigning Prince, Ștefan Cantacuzino was deposed by the Kapucu, then executed. His father, the scholar Constantin II, refused to take the throne, but was still killed by the Ottomans; various other members of the family took flight from Wallachia.

Brâncoveanu and the Cantacuzinos' downfall created the background for the consolidation of a Phanariote regime, with more direct control over the principalities, exercised by the Porte through mainly Greek princes. As noted by several historians, by then the Cantacuzinos were no longer regarded as Greek, but rather as leaders of a "national party", and as rightful heirs of the Basarabs. This was also partly argued by cultural historian Virgil Cândea, who suggests that, following a political line drawn by Constantin II, the Cantacuzinos merged Byzantine, Phanariote and Romanian nationalist ideologies into a single format. In the 1730s, at the height of his family's conflict with the Phanariotes, Ștefan's son, Radu Cantacuzino, fled to Western Europe and tried to enlist help for obtaining the Wallachian throne. He was a noted forger, who increased his prestige with spurious genealogies. Several of these referred to Andronikos, or Andronicus Cantacuzenus, as a Grand Master of the Sacred Military Constantinian Order of Saint George.

Of the institutions still associated with Andronikos, Dușca became a noted obstacle to the urban development of Buzău, extending its property over various urban plots; it had a protracted legal conflict with the laypeople, who made a habit of building townhouses on monastery land. As its core building, Banului Church was rebuilt in the 1710s by Andreiana Fălcoianu, widow of Drăghici's son Șerban II. Completed in 1722, it is the only surviving portion of the old monastery complex. Most of the latter was confiscated by the Romanian state in 1864; while the rebuilt church is in use, only one wall survives from the original Dușca.
