= Leca of Cătun =

Postelnic of Wallachia
- In office August 16, 1602 – December 10, 1610

Personal details
- Born: unknown date Argeș County?
- Died: February or March 1616
- Spouse: Grăjdana Băleanu
- Relations: Udrea Băleanu (brother-in-law)

Military service
- Allegiance: Wallachia; Holy Roman Empire
- Years of service: 1599–1602; 1614–1616
- Rank: Spatharios (1614–1616)
- Commands: Wallachian military forces
- Battles/wars: Long Turkish War: Battle of Mirăslău; Battle of Guruslău

Leca or Lecca of Cătun, also known as Leca of Leurdeni, Leca Rudeanu, Comisul Leca, or Postelnico Leka (Hungarian: Kommis Leká;? – February or March 1616), was a Wallachian political figure, prominent under Princes Michael the Brave, Radu Șerban, and Radu Mihnea. Originally a Comis, his first major assignments came during Prince Michael's conquest of Transylvania, when he also submitted to, and fought for, the Holy Roman Empire. Leca was a commander of Wallachian troops in Michael's battles at Mirăslău (1600) and Guruslău (1601), returning to Wallachia after Michael's assassination.

Leca was a Postelnic and diplomat during Prince Radu Șerban's eight-year reign, following the court into its exile to Moldavia (1610–1612). Like the Prince, he was still aligned with the pro-imperial party, hoping to obtain Habsburg support for a return to power. He switched his allegiance toward Radu Mihnea, and served another two years (1614–1616) as Wallachia's Spatharios. His career and life were ended by accusations of treachery, with the Prince also confiscating his estate. Leca's lineage was virtually extinguished by his execution.

== Biography ==
=== Rise ===
Leca rose through the ranks following the ascent of Michael the Brave in the late 1590s, at the same time as a homonymous Aga, Leca Racotă; the latter was not a local Romanian, but an ethnic Albanian. Some accounts, relying on genealogical records kept by Octav-George Lecca, treat both figures as one and the same person. As noted by historian Dorel Țuinea, the mistake was still being replicated in works of history that appeared in the 2010s. Few details exist about the Romanian Leca's early life, beyond his belonging to the boyar aristocracy. It is nevertheless known that he had at least one brother, Comis Toma of Pătroaia. From about 1610–1620, he was primarily known as the lord of a Cătun village, which used to exist in the immediate vicinity of Pitești and Ștefănești, having purchased it from the boyar Balea. For his services to Prince Michael, he was later granted the estate of Grozăvești and the rank of Comis. Some records suggest that Leca was also given the village of Micșunești, whose serfs were then allowed to purchase their freedom.

Leca was by then married to Lady Grăjdana Băleanu, making him the brother-in-law of Michael's general, Ban Udrea Băleanu. The first attested bearer of that name in Romanian history, she had been previously married to another Comis, Badea of Greci. Following the creation of their bond as in-laws, Leca and Ban Băleanu were together the ktitors of Panaghia Monastery, in Gorgota. In 1599, both Leca and his Albanian namesake followed Michael into his conquest of Transylvania. Historian N. Stoicescu tentatively identifies Leca of Cătun as a member of the Boyar Council created by Michael in Alba Iulia, the Transylvanian capital, from March 25, 1600. If the identification is correct, Leca also fought alongside Michael in Moldavia, and was present on the council as it moved to Iași, down to August 1600. Leca was still listed as a Comis, within Michael's itinerant court, whereas Michael's son and regent in Wallachia, Nicolae Pătrașcu, had his own Comis, Mandea. This presents a historiographic problem, since it remains unclear which one of the two was regarded as the legitimate holder of the office.

Michael's campaigns in Transylvania and Moldavia were part of the Long Turkish War: Wallachia was allied with the Holy Roman Empire, under Rudolf II, and with an international Holy League, against the Ottomans. That arrangement was sabotaged from within by the warlord Giorgio Basta, who commanded the allegiance of various imperial troops, and who fought Michael for control of the region; the Hungarian nobility, which swore allegiance to Sigismund Báthory, also rebelled, confronting Michael in the battle of Mirăslău in September 1600. Shortly after, Leca of Cătun wrote to the imperial commissioner, Bartholomeus Pezzen, asking to be received into Austrian nobility, like Aga Leca had been. Nonetheless, by that time the Aga had betrayed Michael, and was acting as Basta's agent inside the Wallachian ranks.

Map of Leca's domains in Wallachia by the time of his death in 1616

While Michael was trying to resume control over Transylvania, the Polish–Lithuanian Commonwealth invaded Moldavia and then occupied Wallachia as well, placing Simion Movilă on the throne in Bucharest. During Michael's failed counterattack, Comis Leca's brother-in-law, Băleanu, was captured by the Commonwealth army; he was later executed on Movilă's orders. The new ruler also confiscated Micșunești and then transferred it to a Captain Ghyula. Michael withdrew to Transylvania, then made his way into imperial territory, asking for more assistance in Vienna and Prague. Historians provide conflicting accounts about what the Comis was doing at this time. According to Constantin Rezachevici, he and Aga Leca were both garrisoned in Transylvania, waiting for Michael to return. Contrarily, Ștefan Andreescu argues that Leca followed his lord, one member of a retinue which also included Mihalcea of Cocărăști and Aga Farcaș.

=== Death and legacy ===
In early 1601, Michael returned to Transylvania as the leader of an imperial army, having reconciled with Basta. Comis Leca also moved around the region; in March, Miklós Zólyomi was left in charge of his servants and horses at Székelyhíd, as revealed by a letter in which Zólyomi reasserts his loyalty to the Wallachians. Leca was also attached to the imperial force, which won a decisive victory over the Hungarian rebels on August 3, 1601, at Guruslău. Just days after, the conflict between Basta and Michael had been rekindled, and the latter was assassinated in his quarters at Câmpia Turzii. Leca remained in Transylvania with the rump Wallachian army, alongside Preda, Radu, and Stroe Buzescu, submitting to Rudolf II with a letter, dated November 5, 1601. Drafted in New Latin, this document has him as Comes Leka, signed after his namesake Leka Agha. The following year, he was again in Wallachia and directly involved in the election of a new Prince, Radu Șerban.

From August 16, 1602, to December 10, 1610, Leca was Wallachia's Great Postelnic; his Albanian namesake, who remained committed to the Holy Roman Empire, died in Transylvania, at some point before August 1606, being survived by his mother and sister. The Postelnic took leave in October 1604 to represent Radu Șerban at the court in Vienna, negotiating there a truce between Wallachia and the Crimean Khanate. In November 1610, the feud between Radu Șerban and Gabriel Báthory became a Transylvanian invasion of Wallachia, chasing the Wallachian court into Moldavia. In 1612, Rudolf's successor on the Holy Roman throne, Matthias, promised to support the outcast Prince and his boyars against the usurper, Radu Mihnea. Matthias' letter, in Latin, lists the boyars by name, with references to postelnico Leka.

Leca eventually returned from Moldavia before the end of that year, swearing his fealty to Radu Mihnea. From his deceased brother-in-law, Leca now owned the estate of Leurdeni, Ilfov County, where Leca built himself a manor; in February 1613, the former Postelnic and Grăjdana received a new demesne, at Mărcești. On January 7, 1614, he was assigned the rank of Great Spatharios. His tenure ended abruptly on February 24, 1616, when he was charged by the Prince with rea hiclenie ("evil treason"). Leca was then executed at some point before March 11, and buried at Panaghia; all of his estates were confiscated. As noted by historians, he had left no children, but was survived by his wife into the 1640s.

In the 1620s, when Radu Mihnea left his throne to become Prince of Moldavia, Grăjdana was returned ownership of Cătun by a ruling of the Boyar Council. Also retaking Leurdeni, she continued to fight in court over her various other lands, being simultaneously involved in transactions of serfs and Romani slaves. One of Leca's nephews, Mihai, was a commander (Iuzbașa) of elite cavalrymen, or Roșiori ("Redcoats"), under Prince Matei Basarab. He was married to another Grăjdana, who was also a slave-owning entrepreneur. Based on his identification with the Albanian Aga, Leca of Cătun has been presented as an ancestor of the Lecca boyars, including the genealogist Octav-George, the painter Constantin Lecca and the playwright Haralamb Lecca, as well as the politician Gheorghe Lecca. By then, the Leurdeni manor, incorporated within Bucharest's city limits, had passed on to the Manu boyars, and later to Nadejda Romalo, who restored it.
