= Mirăslău =

Mirăslău Miriszló
- Commune
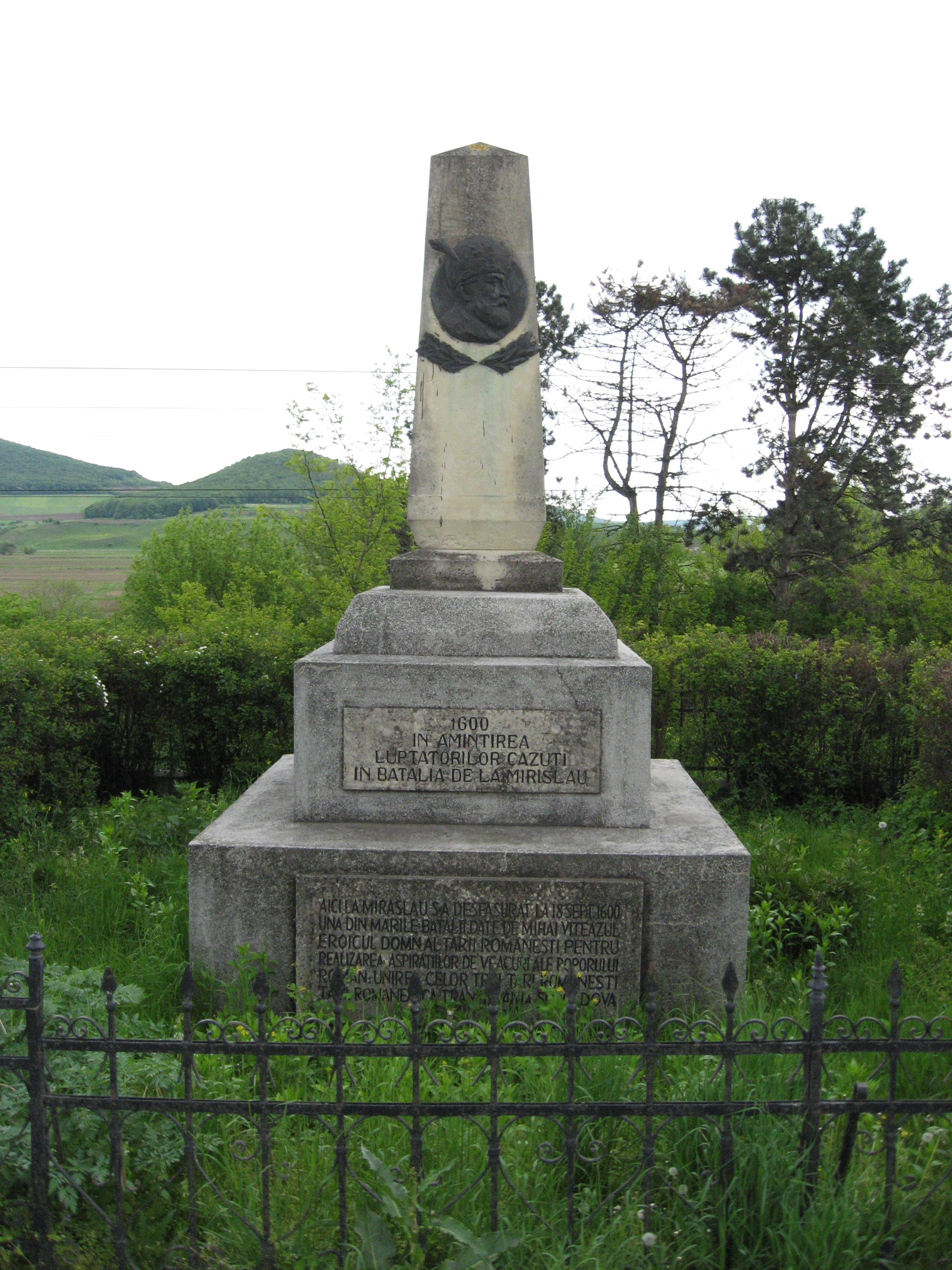
- Monument to Battle of Mirăslău (1600)

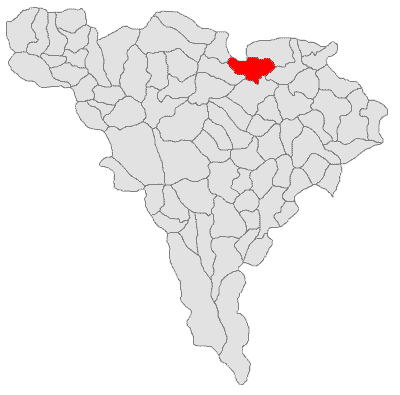
- Location within Alba County

- Location in Romania
- Coordinates: 46°22′00″N 23°43′00″E
- Country: Romania
- County: Alba

Government
  - Mayor (2020–2024): Liviu-Gigel Alexandru (PNL)
- Area: 66.59 km^{2} (25.71 sq mi)
- Elevation: 238 m (781 ft)
- Population (2021-12-01): 1,805
  - Density: 27.11/km^{2} (70.20/sq mi)
- Time zone: UTC+02:00 (EET)
  - Summer (DST): UTC+03:00 (EEST)
- Postal code: 517470
- Area code: +40 x58
- Vehicle reg.: AB
- Website: www.primariamiraslau.ro

Mirăslău (German: Mireslau; Hungarian: Miriszló) is a commune located in Alba County, Transylvania, Romania. It has a population of 1,805 as of 2021. The commune is composed of six villages: Cicău (Csákó), Decea (Marosdécse), Lopadea Veche (Oláhlapád), Mirăslău, Ormeniș (Marosörményes), and Rachiș (Oláhrákos).

== Geography ==
The commune lies at the western edge of the Transylvanian Plateau, on the banks of the Mureș River. It is situated in the northern part of Alba County, 7 km (4.3 mi) from the city of Aiud, on the border with Cluj County.

National road DN1 leads south to Aiud, Teiuș, and the county seat, Alba Iulia, 37 km (23 mi) away, and north to Turda and Cluj-Napoca, at a distance of 64 km (40 mi). The A10 motorway runs through Decea, parallel to DN1. The Mirăslău train station serves the CFR Line 300, which runs from Bucharest to Brașov, Teiuș, Cluj-Napoca, and on to the Hungarian border.

== History ==
Mirăslău is the site of a battle in 1600 between the Wallachian army led by Michael the Brave and the Hungarian noblemen supported by the Austrian general Giorgio Basta (see Battle of Mirăslău).

== Demographics ==
At the 2021 census, Mirăslău had a population of 1,805; of those, 61.44% were Romanians, 24.89% Hungarians, and 5.43% Roma. At the 2011 census, the commune had a population of 1,985; of those, 67.5% were Romanians, 27.8% Hungarians, and 4.5% Roma. At the 2002 census, 66.4% were Romanian Orthodox, 25% Reformed, and 4% Greek-Catholic.

Historical population
Year	Pop.	±%
1850	2,937	—
1900	3,519	+19.8%
1956	3,913	+11.2%
2002	2,334	−40.4%
2011	1,985	−15.0%
2021	1,805	−9.1%
Source: INS, Census data
