= Deli-Marko =

Deli-Marko (Serbian Cyrillic: Дели-Марко, "Wild Marko"; fl. 1596–1619) or Marko Segedinac (Марко Сегединац, "Marko of Segedin"), was a Serb hajduk and military commander in Habsburg service, active during the Long Turkish War.

He was mentioned for the first time after 1590, as a youngster commanding a band of Serb soldiers in the service of Sigismund Báthory, the Prince of Transylvania. Báthory's army which headed to liberate Timișoara included notable Serbs, such as Đorđe Rac, Deli-Marko, and Sava Temišvarac. The army managed to conquer the Serbian part of the town. These Serb leaders, including Starina Novak, fought as part of the Transylvanian Army, but carried out independent raids south of the Danube, into what is today Bulgaria and Serbia, even managing to raid as deep as Plovdiv and Adrianople. Deli-Marko's bold maneuvers in Ottoman territory enraged the Ottoman government. He raided merchant caravans and ships, and even went as far as across the Balkan Mountains and to the Maritsa river. The Serb commanders mainly operated outside Transylvania, with the support of the Emperor. The Serb soldiers and refugees were taken care of by the War Council in Vienna.

In 1605, together with Sava Temišvarac, he left Transylvania and crossed to western Hungary. The Long Turkish War ended in 1606 with the Peace of Zsitvatorok. When Emperor Rudolf II started quarreling with his brother, Matthias, Temišvarac, Đorđe Rac and Deli-Marko supported the latter, joining with their people. All mercenary bands commanded by the three Serb leaders participated in the march on Rudolf II.

Deli-Marko joined the forces of Italian general Giorgio Basta. In 1616 he moved to Transylvania.

== Sources ==
- Kolundžija, Zoran (2008). Vojvodina: Od najstarijih vremena do velike seobe. Prometej. ISBN 9788651503064.
- Popović, Dušan J. (1957). Srbi u Vojvodini (1): Od najstarijih vremena do Karlovačkog mira 1699. Matica srpska. pp. 185–.
- Radovan Samardžić (1993). Srbi pod tuđinskom vlašću (1537–1699). Vol. 2.
