= Gheorghe Lecca =

Romanian politician

Gheorghe Lecca (10 April 1831–30 August 1885) was a Moldavian-born Romanian politician.

Born in Bacău, he was the son of paharnic (royal cup-bearer) Gheorghe Lecca (reportedly a descendant of Leca of Cătun), who died the year after the son was born; and of Maria Negură. Together with his brothers Ioan and Dimitrie, he attended the Saumur Cavalry School. After returning home in 1854, he took part in the Crimean War. After leaving army service, he served as prefect of Bacău County in 1866, and then as deputy and senator. In early 1882, he was named Finance Minister in the Liberal government of Ion C. Brătianu, serving until his death (in Bacău).

He had four children with his first wife Mariana Mălinescu (d. 1875), and a son with his second, Clara Negură (his first cousin, 1852–1909). Two of his sons, Caton (1860–1913) and Jean (1863–1898), entered politics.
