= Battle of Mirăslău =

Battle during the Long Turkish War

- Part of Long War (Ottoman wars)
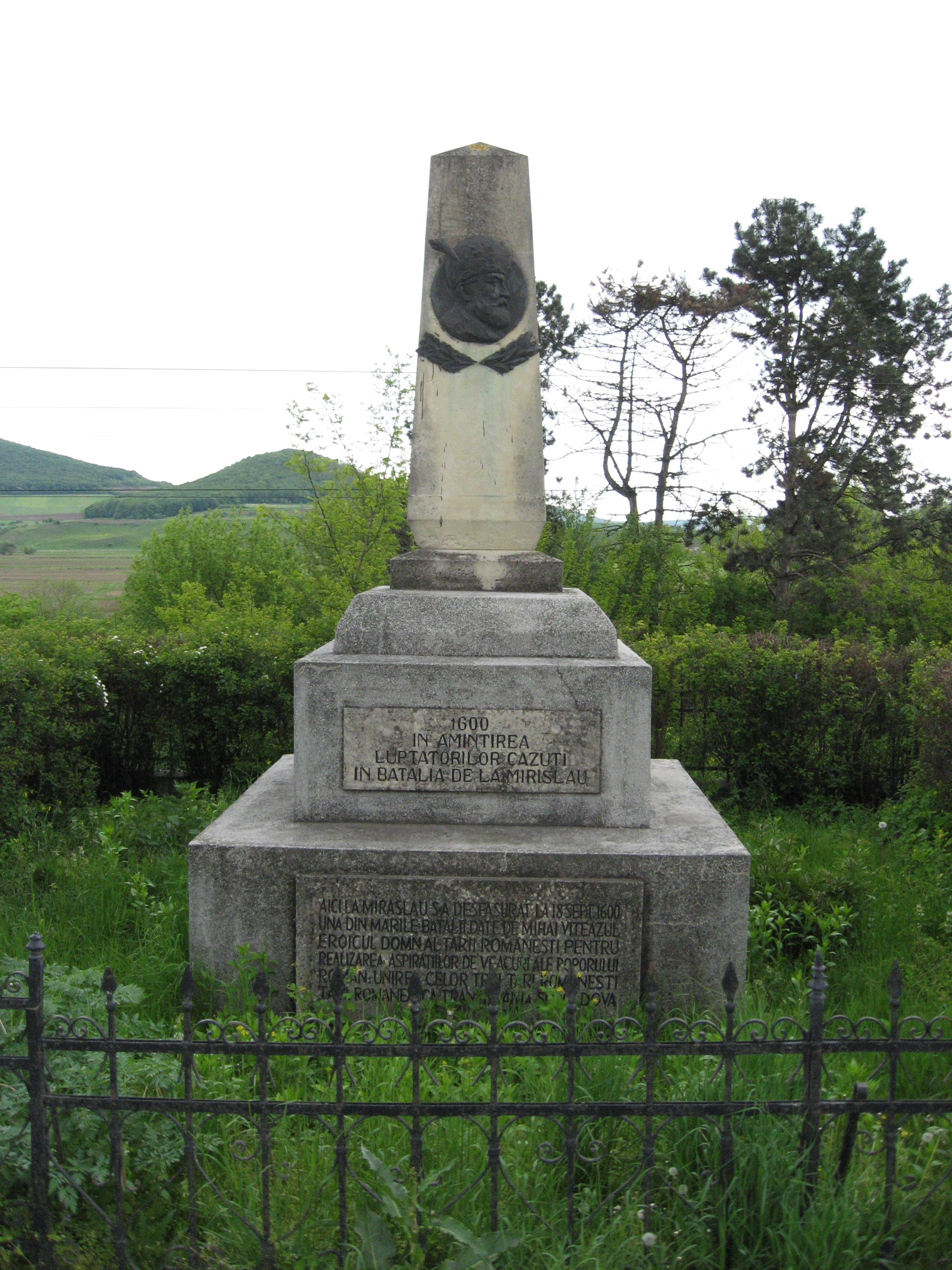
- Monument to the battle of Mirăslău from 1956 in Mirăslău
Date	September 18, 1600
Location	Mirăslău, Principality of Transylvania
Result	Habsburg and Hungarian nobility victory

Belligerents
Wallachia; Székelys; Zaporozhian Cossacks; Poles	Holy Roman Empire; Transylvanian Hungarians; Transylvanian Saxons

Commanders and leaders
Michael the Brave; Baba Novac; Leca of Cătun	Giorgio Basta

Strength
22,000 men	30,000 men

Casualties and losses
More than 5,000 killed in action More than 5,000 captured	1,000 casualties

The Battle of Mirăslău, or Battle of Miriszló, took place on September 18, 1600, near Miriszló (Romanian: Mirăslău), Transylvania, between the Wallachian troops led by Michael the Brave supported by ethnic Hungarian Szeklers and the troops of Austrian general Giorgio Basta supported by the Hungarian nobility of Transylvania.

In 1599, Michael took control of Transylvania after the Battle of Șelimbăr. In autumn 1599, Michael was elected prince of Transylvania by the Estates of the country. Although the Emperor Rudolf II wanted Michael and his general Basta to govern Transylvania together, Michael, the de facto ruler, despised Basta from their initial meetings. Therefore, at a certain point in 1600, Michael became disgraced at the Habsburg emperor.

In 1600, Hungarian noblemen from Transylvania rebelled against Michael and gathered an army near Gyulafehérvár (Alba Iulia). The troops of Basta joined the Hungarian noblemen rebelling against Michael. The ethnic Hungarian Szeklers, however, kept supporting Michael as he had confirmed Szekler privileges disputed by the Hungarian nobility.

Basta marched against the Wallachian army which Michael had gathered in the small village of Miriszló (Romanian: Mirăslău), a few kilometers north of the river Mureș. The Wallachian army numbered approximately 22,000, consisting mainly of mercenaries of different nationalities, including Hungarian Szeklers, Cossacks, and Poles. Baba Novac led the cavalry at the center of the army. Basta's army of 30,000 consisted of troops of the Hungarian nobility, Austrian and Saxon troops, mostly mercenaries.

Michael's forces began the battle with a well-positioned cannonade from a hillside, while his main troops were protected in the town by 2,000 Szekler gunmen. In this first stage, many Hungarian noblemen were killed by cannonballs, and the battle appeared to be setting itself as an easy victory for Michael.

However, Basta had set a trap for the Wallachian army; by pretending to retreat from his position, Basta intended for Michael to leave his defensive entrenchments and follow the Austrian. Upon viewing Basta's feigned retreat, Michael supposedly said, "Now the coward dog is running, we should follow him." Michael's army quickly left the fortifications to charge Basta's army, but the general turned his heavy cavalry on the advancing Wallachians and routed them.

This defeat caused panic to ensue in Michael's army. The Cossack mercenaries were the first to flee, leading to many of them drowning in the Maros. Baba Novac led a determined resistance in the middle of the line with his cavalry, but it was not enough to turn the tide of the battle. Realizing the futility of continuing the battle, Michael took his horse and swam across the Maros. The Wallachian casualties were high, with more than 5,000 men killed in action and many more prisoners, especially Szeklers, later executed by the vindictive Hungarian nobility. Basta's army lost approximately 1,000 men in the battle. The defeat of Michael put an end to his rule in Transylvania. After being soon expelled from Wallachia by the Polish troops led by Jan Karol Chodkiewicz, Michael went to Prague to win Rudolf's favour once again. After succeeding to do so, he was sent back to Transylvania by Rudolf in 1601. Basta and Michael defeated together Prince Sigismund Báthory at Goroszló, however, Basta had him assassinated on August 9, 1601.

As he was already the prince of Wallachia and Moldavia, his election as prince of Transylvania is regarded by Romanian historiography as a very important moment of Romanian history, being the first occasion that all three territories which had a Romanian population came under a single ruler. Romanian historiography asserts that it was Michael's goal to unite the three provinces inhabited by Romanians.

Hungarian historiography regards his election as prince of Transylvania as an episode in the anarchic years of the Long War fought by the Habsburg Empire and the Ottoman Empire which did not have national character in the modern sense of the term. In Transylvania, these years were characterized by fierce political struggle and intrigues between different factions of Hungarian nobility, ethnic Hungarian Szeklers, and Saxons forming the Union of Three Nations. This struggle was combined with the military and political interference in Transylvanian affairs by the rivaling Habsburg and Ottoman Empires supporting from time to time one faction or another. The years of the Long War had a devastating effect on Transylvania which only ended by the rule of Prince István Bocskay in 1604.
