= Octav Dessila =

Octav Dessila (December 4, 1895 – July 29, 1976) was a Romanian novelist and playwright.

Born in Bucharest, his parents were Iorgu Dessila, a Căile Ferate Române employee, and his wife Aristița (née Gheorghiu). He was part of the first class to graduate from the military high school at Dealu Monastery, and became an officer in the Romanian Land Forces. His first novel was Dragomir Valahul (1927), followed by Zvetlana (1930), București, orașul prăbușirilor (1930), Neastâmpăr (1934), Turbă (1936), Cartea cu minciuni (1936), Două chemări (vol. I-II, 1936), Iubim (vol. I-III, 1941-1943) and Porți fără număr (vol. I-II, 1946). He also wrote plays: Un om care dă palme vieții (1938) and Mihai Viteazul (1967). He belonged to the Romanian Writers' Society from 1931 to 1948, winning its prize in 1935; he was also a member of the Romanian Writers' Union from 1967. In 1937, he won the Romanian Academy's I. Al. Brătescu-Voinești prize. Iubim was the last in a string of commercial successes; revised and republished in 1970, it did not even attract attention from readers of its genre, suggesting the obsolete nature of Dessila's literary output.
