= Starina Novak =

Serbian Hajduk (1530–1601)

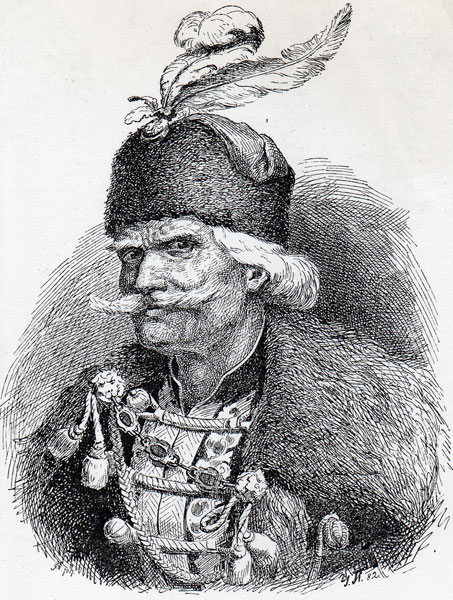
- Born: c. 1520 or c. 1530; Poreč, Ottoman Empire (now Donji Milanovac, Serbia)
- Died: 5 February 1601 (aged 70–71); Kolozsvár, Principality of Transylvania (now Cluj-Napoca, Romania)
- Military career
- Allegiance: Wallachia
- Service years: 154x–1601
- Rank: Captain
- Nickname: Baba Novak
- Unit: Hajduk unit of Michael the Brave
- Conflicts: Long Turkish War

Starina Novak (Serbian Cyrillic: Старинa Новак; Romanian: Baba Novac; Bulgarian: Баба Новак, meaning "Old Novak") was a Serb hajduk (brigand and rebel) who distinguished himself in many battles against the Ottoman Empire. He is considered a national hero by both the Serbs and the Romanians.

== Early life ==
Novak was born in c. 1520 or c. 1530 to a Serbian family in the village of Poreč, on an island on the Danube, at the time part of the Ottoman Empire (today Donji Milanovac, Serbia). His family hailed from the Timok Valley. He studied at the monastery of Poreč where he learned to read and write in Old Church Slavonic. In addition to his Serbian mother tongue, he also learned Romanian in the Timok valley, Greek, and Turkish while a slave of the Ottomans.

== Military career ==
He began his career as a hajduk at an early age after he was imprisoned and beaten by Turks, losing all his teeth (hence the name Old Novak) that led him to leave his birthplace and take refuge in the forests of the Timok Valley where he quickly learned the use of weapons and military from a harambaša (commander of the hajudks). He soon formed his own četa (hajduk band) and started a violent fight against the Ottomans. His strong personality and military prowess made him a man of many followers and his guerrillas became a strong fighting force.

The oldest mention of Novak is from 1595, when he was mentioned in the forces of Wallachian prince Michael the Brave. Novak joined the forces of Michael in the region of Banat, and received the rank of captain with 2,000 Serbian hajduks (brigands) under his command, set to liberate the Wallachian lands. His forces participated in the seizure of Călugăreni, and liberated Târgoviște, Bucharest, and Giurgiu in October 1595. His forces were part of the attack on Bulgarian Sofia which earned him great reputation after he and his 700 soldiers tricked the Turks by changing route through the Balkan mountains and successfully surprise-attacked the Turkish forces only leaving behind 8 of his soldiers and capturing vast amounts of livestock and supplies from the Ottomans. He liberated Plevna with 1,500 soldiers.

In 1598, his sizable forces, composed primarily of Serbs but also some Bulgarians, met the remaining forces of Michael the Brave, amounting to a total of 16,000 armed men. They liberated Plevna, Rahovo, Vratsa, Vidin, and Florentin, after which the Serbs and Bulgarians of those cities gathered with his forces and had a feast. In 1599, a force of 50,000+ men under the command of Bordj Mako gathered with the forces of Novak in Ploiești, in a square with 5-6 rows in the center, before capturing Sibiu. In 1600 his forces were deployed in Banat; he was then instructed to liberate all lands to the south, also part of the uprisings in Mirăslău and nearby towns. Novak followed Michael to Vienna in December 1600.

He was accused of wanting to hand over the fortresses of Lugos and Karánsebes to the Turks, but his intention was unveiled in time. For this Novak was accused of treason by ally-turned-rival Giorgio Basta and was sent to the Hungarian authorities in Cluj (Kolozsvár), sentenced to burning. The execution took place on 5 February 1601. Gypsies prepared the fire that would be the end of Novak, two of Michael's captains, Joan Celeste and Savi Armašulu, and some Saxon priests. After being burnt alive for 1 to 5 hours (water was tossed at the bodies for a slower death), the bodies were impaled and crows were eating from the corpses. Although the authenticity of the letters alleging his betrayal is uncertain, his arrest and execution were actually precipitated by his loyalty to Voivode Michael and the atrocities his troops had previously committed in Transylvania. Michael was unaware of the execution and heard of it when passing through Cluj in early August 1601; he raised a flag on the site of the execution. Giorgio Basta then ordered the assassination of Michael, which took place near Câmpia Turzii on 9 August 1601.

== Epic poetry ==
Starina Novak is venerated as a hero in the Serbian epic poetry, as the central figure in poems such as Starina Novak i knez Bogosav, Starina Novak i deli Radivoje, and others. Some poems confuse Starina Novak with an older military commander, Novak Debelić, a nobleman from the 15th century; thus, the character of Starina Novak in epic poetry could be said to include two individuals.

== Legacy ==
Streets in Constanța, Cluj-Napoca, Craiova, Bucharest, Brașov, and Belgrade are named after him.

The song Baba Novak by the Romanian band Phoenix is about him.

In Serbia, a section of Belgrade's neighborhood of Palilula is dedicated to Starina Novak. Features bearing his name include the street, a local community (sub-municipal administrative unit), an elementary school founded in 1922, and a park. The area occupied by the park today was named Starina Novak Square until 1954. In October 2017, the city's administration announced that a monument to Starina Novak will be erected in the park.

== See also ==
- Jovan Nenad, self-styled Emperor in Vojvodina (1527)
- Bishop Teodor, Orthodox bishop and leader of the Banat Uprising (1594)

== Sources ==
- Lupescu, Radu (2018). "Baba Novák kivégzése és kolozsvári kultusza" [The execution of Baba Novak and his cult in Cluj]. Örökmozgó. Kolozsvár: EXIT kiadó. pp. 104–117.
- Vanku, Milan (1988). "Baba Novak u rumunskoj istoriografiji" [Baba Novak in Romanian historiography]. In Samardžić, Radovan (ed.). Starina Novak i njegovo doba [Starina Novak and his era] (PDF) (in Serbian). Belgrade: Srpska akademija nauka i umetnosti. pp. 79–85. ISBN 9788671790017.
- Samardžić, Radovan; Veselinović, Rajko L.; Popović, Toma (1993). Radovan Samardžić (ed.). Istorija srpskog naroda. Treća knjiga, prvi tom: Srbi pod tuđinskom vlašću 1537–1699 (in Serbian). Belgrade: Srpska književna zadruga.
