= Radu Buzescu =

Noble of Wallachia

Radu Buzescu was a boyar (noble) of Wallachia during the reign of Michael the Brave.

He took part in important political and military events at the time. His brothers were Preda and Stroe Buzescu, the three forming the group of the Buzești brothers. Together with them, he helped the voivodes Michael the Brave and Radu Șerban in battles, fulfilling various missions assigned to them. After the death of Michael, the Buzești brothers opposed Simion Movilă's short reign and helped Șerban to reach the throne of Wallachia in October 1601. Enjoying a great political and military authority, they consistently supported the reign of Șerban.

Radu Buzescu, together with Preda Buzescu, is buried at the Călui Monastery.
