= Battle of Șelimbăr =

1599 battle of the Long Turkish War

Battle of Șelimbar
- Part of the Long Turkish War
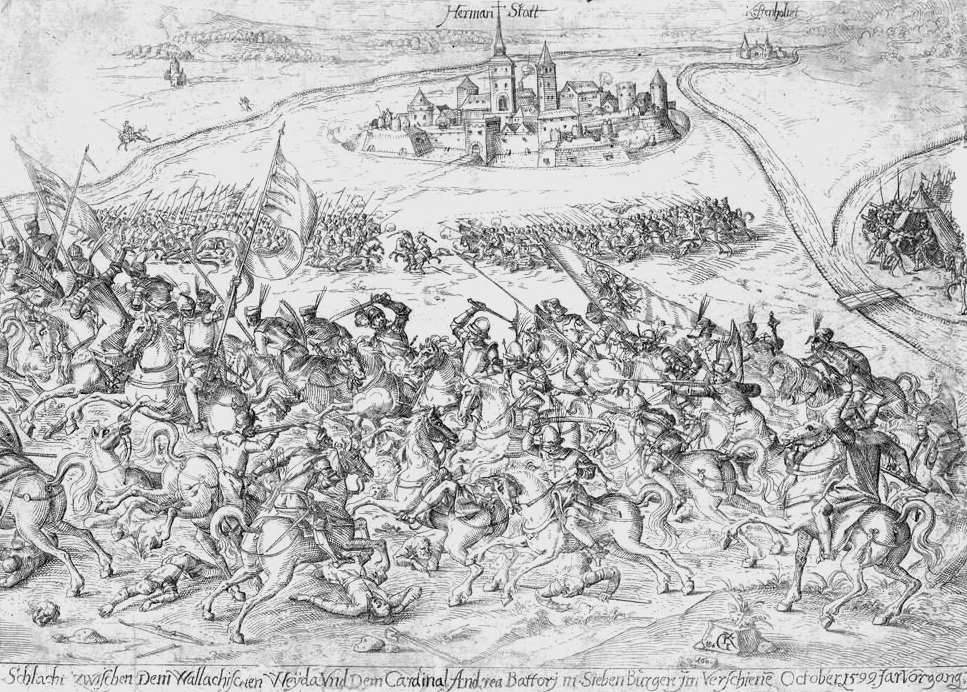
- Contemporary depiction of the battle by Georg Keller
Date	18 October 1599
Location	Șelimbăr (Sellenberk), Principality of Transylvania, now in Romania
Result	Wallachian–Székely victory

Belligerents
Wallachia; Székelys; Serb hajduks Zaporozhian Cossacks and Hungarian mercenaries	Principality of Transylvania

Commanders and leaders
Michael the Brave; Starina Novak (Baba Novac)	(Transylvania) Andrew Báthory (executed) (Transylvania) Gaspar Kornis (POW)

Strength
20,000–30,000 men, 18 cannons	16,000–25,000 men, 45 cannons

Casualties and losses
200–1,000	1,200–1,500 or 2,027 death, all cannons lost

The Battle of Șelimbăr, or Battle of Sellenberk (Hungarian: Sellenberk; German: Schellenberg), took place on 18 October 1599 between the Wallachian army of Michael the Brave (Romanian: Mihai Viteazul) and the Transylvanian-Hungarian army of Andrew Báthory (Hungarian: Báthory András). The battle was fought near the village of Șelimbăr (Hungarian: Sellenberk) close to Sibiu (German: Hermannstadt; Hungarian: Nagyszeben).

== Background ==
Michael the Brave marched into Transylvania to fight against the Ottomans. The neighboring rulers Andrew Báthory in Transylvania and Ieremia Movilă in Moldavia were friendly towards Poland.

In 1598, Michael signed a treaty of peace with the Ottomans, however both sides knew that the issue was far from settled. When Transylvania fell under the influence of Poland, which preserved friendly relations with the Ottomans, a hostile ring closed around Wallachia. Only the Habsburgs were prepared to ally themselves with Michael. The treaty, signed in Prague on 9 June 1598, made Wallachia a vassal state; in exchange, the emperor undertook to cover the cost of providing 5.000 mercenaries to the principality. The voivode wanted to secure a land link to his ally. With Emperor Rudolph's assent, he launched an attack on Transylvania.

He informed the Székelys that he was attacking Transylvania on behalf of the Emperor Rudolf and, if they join him, their traditional freedoms will be restored. At this the Székelys joined the forces of Michael en masse so that Székelys comprised one third of his army of 36,000 soldiers.

Michael entered Transylvania through Buzău Pass. Another Wallachian army corps, composed of 6,000 warriors from Oltenia, led by Radu Buzescu, Ban Udrea and Serbian hajduk commander Starina Novak (Baba Novac), crossed the Transylvanian Alps through Turnu Roșu Pass. The junction was made on October 16.

== Battle ==
Michael had approximately 30,000 men at his command. Many of them did not fight, however, preferring instead to remain in the camp and protect the women and children of the boyars who had joined them in this campaign out of the fear of possible Tatar attacks in Wallachia.

The army of Andrew Báthory numbered approximately 25,000 men but during the battle many defected to Michael's army, including the Székelys, who despised the ruling Báthory family. The Wallachians gained the upper hand at the beginning of the battle, but were pushed back quickly by the charge of the Hungarian Hussars. The Transylvanians then had the opportunity to win the battle, but Andrew Báthory refused to commit his rearguard to battle, giving the Wallachians a chance to regroup. The resulting charge against the Transylvanian army was a success, Andrew Báthory fled the field (only to be later assassinated), and Michael headed with his victorious army to the city of Alba Iulia (Gyulafehérvár), as the Diet recognised him as voivode and imperial governor.

Casualties were at least 1,200 to 1,500 or 2,027 death on the Transylvanian side, and 200 to 1,000 men killed on the Wallachian side. The inhabitants of Sibiu (Hermannstadt, Nagyszeben) buried the bodies in a mass grave known today as Michael the Brave's Knoll.

== Aftermath ==
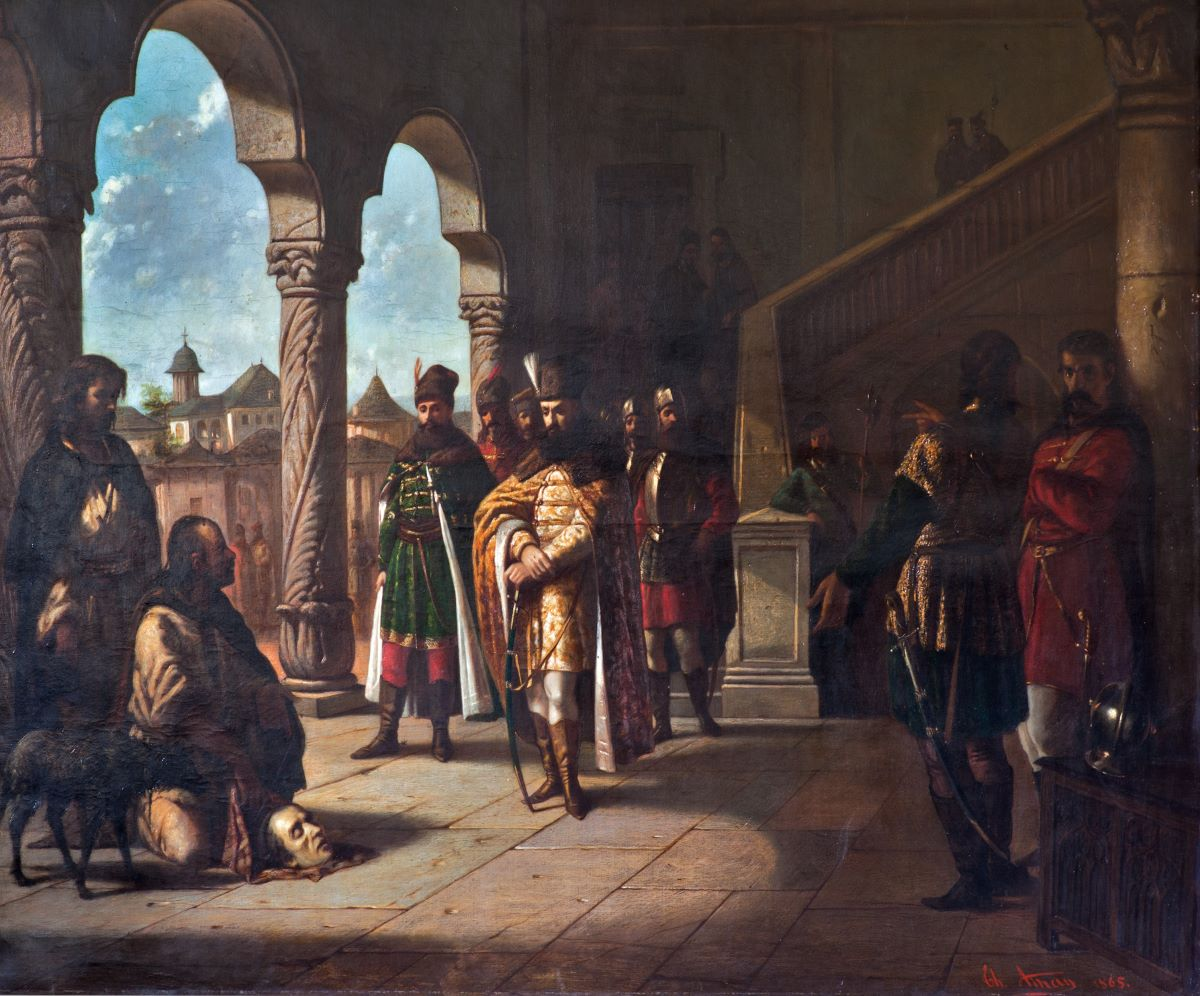
Székelys bring the head of Cardinal Andrew Báthory to Michael the Brave (Theodor Aman)

Michael's victory resulted in him taking over the administration of Transylvania on behalf of Emperor Rudolf.

It has to be said, however, that the governments of Wallachia and Transylvania remained separate, and Michael never attempted to connect Transylvania to Wallachia, nor interfere in Transylvania's system of government (by the Estates). What is more he also invited some Székelys and other Transylvanian Hungarians to assist in the administration of Wallachia, where he wished to transplant Transylvania's far more advanced feudal system.

Especially during the period of the Romanian national awakening, his victories were interpreted as the first unification of the Romanian people, and Michael remains a Romanian national hero.

== See also ==
- Battle of Sellenberk (1916)
