= Postelnic =

Historical rank

Postelnic (Romanian pronunciation: [posˈtelnik], plural: postelnici, from the Slavic postel, "bed"; cf. Russian postelnichy) was a historical rank traditionally held by boyars in Moldavia and Wallachia, roughly corresponding to the position of seneschal or chamberlain. It was also known as stratonic (plural: stratonici), and the office was known as postelnicie or statornicie.

Initially, postelnici had as their main attribute tending to the sleeping quarters of monarchs (at both the Moldavian and Wallachian courts). In time, the office became associated with organizing audiences at both courts, and, during the 19th century, became the equivalent of a foreign minister.
