= Giorgio Basta =

Italian general, diplomat and writer (1550-1607)

Giorgio Basta Gjergj Basta
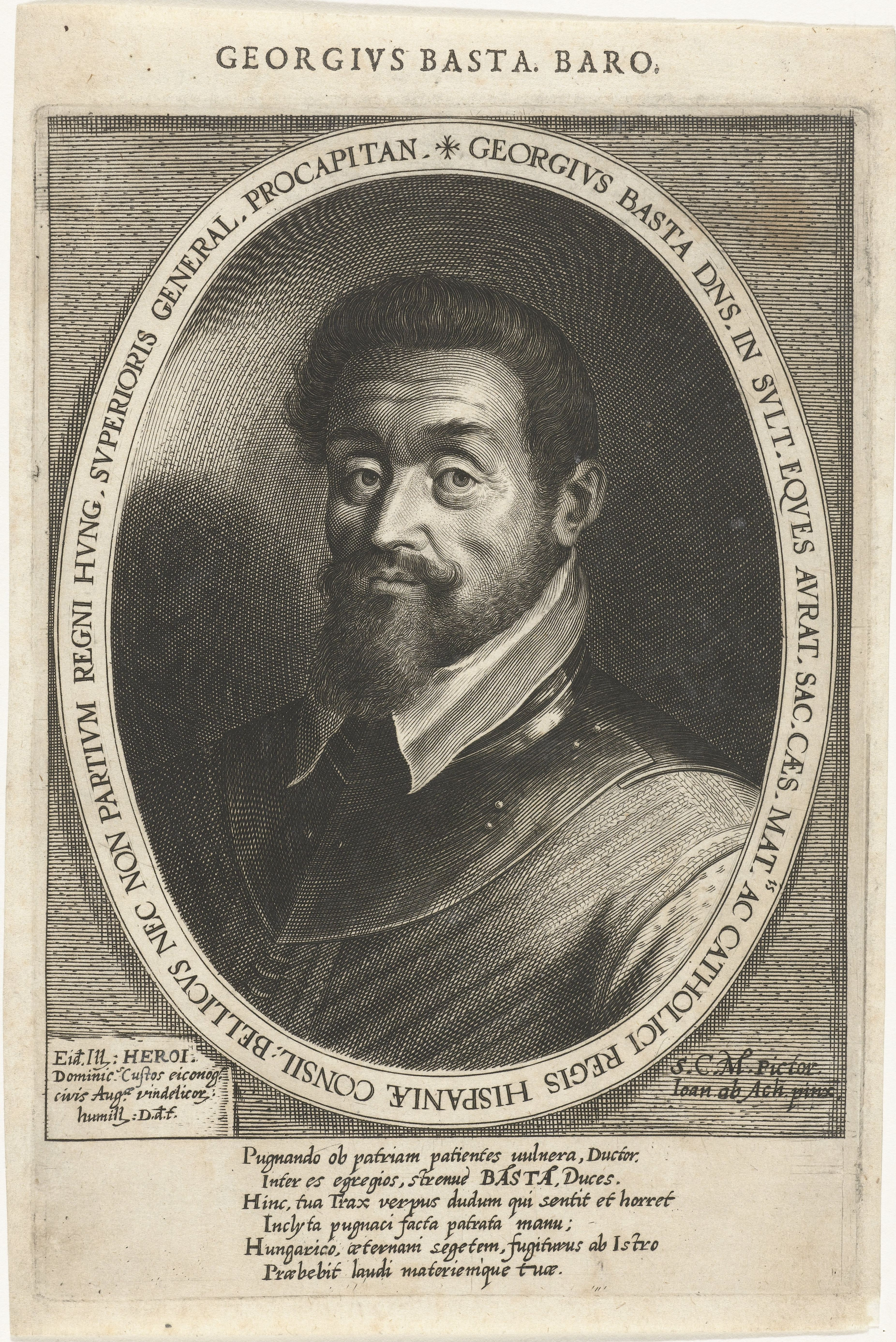
- Born: 1550; La Rocca, Kingdom of Naples (modern Italy)
- Died: 1607 (aged 56–57); Prague, Kingdom of Bohemia (modern Czech Republic
- Relatives: Demetrius Basta (Father)
- Military career
- Allegiance: Spain; Holy Roman Empire
- Branch: Imperial Army
- Rank: General
- Conflicts: French Wars of Religion: Siege of Paris (1590); Siege of Rouen (1591–1592); War of the Three Henrys; Long War: Bocskai uprising; Battle of Mirăslău; Battle of Guruslău

Giorgio Basta (Albanian: Gjergj Basta) also known as Count of Huszt or Gheorghe Basta (1550 – 1607) was an Italian general, diplomat, and writer of Arbëreshë Albanian origin, employed by the Holy Roman Emperor Rudolf II to command Habsburg forces in the Long War of 1593–1606. He was later sent to administer Transylvania as an Imperial vassal and to restore Catholicism as the dominant religion in the region.

On his orders, his ally Michael the Brave, who ruled Transylvania, Wallachia, and Moldavia, was assassinated on 9 August 1601, a few days after the common victory at the Battle of Guruslău, for trying to turn against Rudolf II. For this, he is often depicted as disloyal and violent by Romanian and Hungarian historians. Basta was also the author of books on the art of military leadership.

== Biography ==
Basta was born to an Arbëreshë Albanian father and an Italian mother. He is claimed to be born in La Rocca, modern day Roccaforzata, a village in Salento, Italy, however historical sources claim he was born in Ulpiano nel Monferrato.

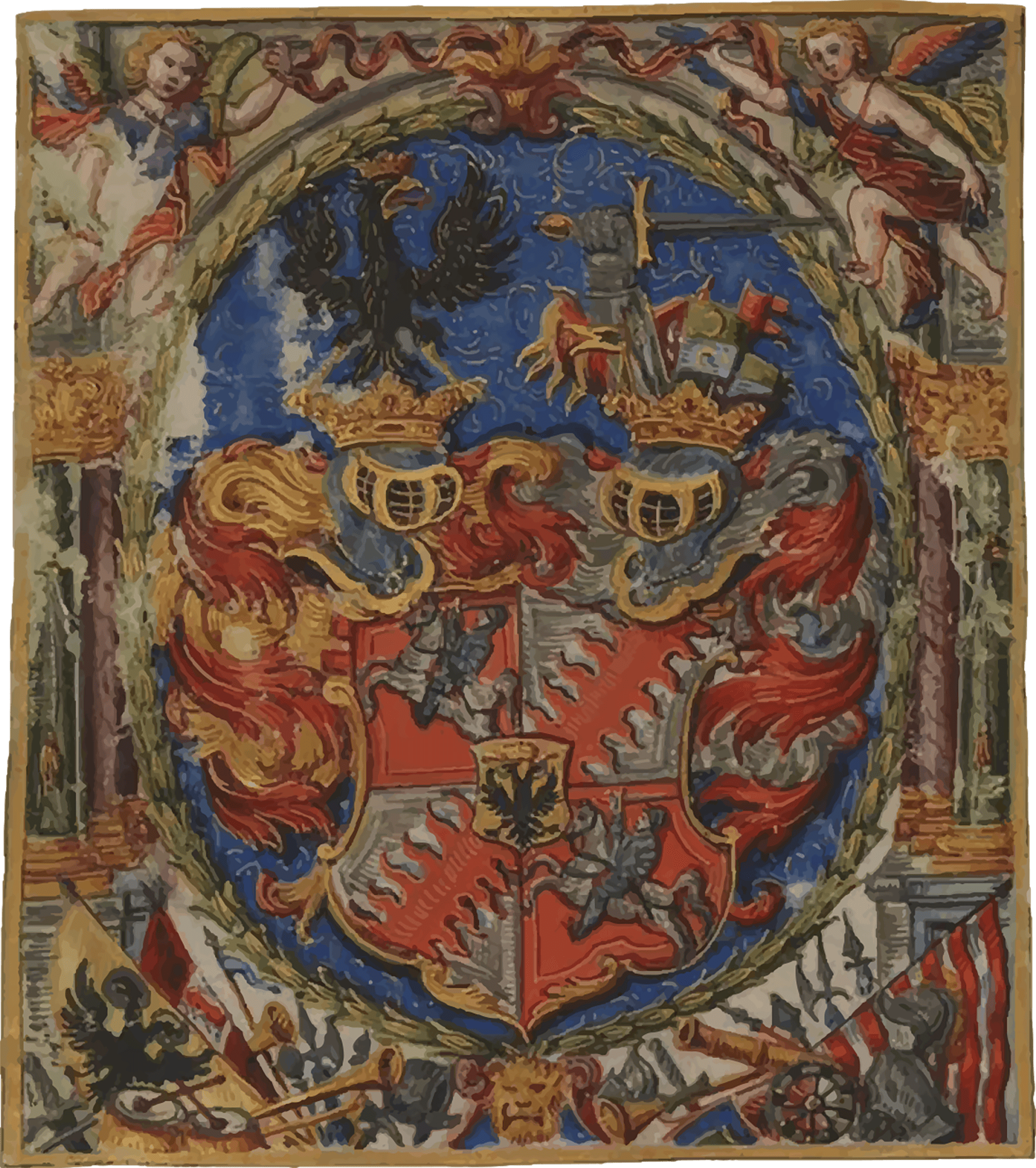
The Coat of arms of Gjergj Basta.

He was the son of Demetrius Basta, an Albanian Epirote who had fled the Ottoman conquest of the region to Italy, where he served the Spanish Empire. His father fought in the Piedmont countryside in the middle 1500s, and then in Flanders as commander of a cavalry regiment under the Duke of Alba. Very young, Basta became a soldier and eventually got promoted to the rank of officer in a detachment commanded by Demetrio. Then after his father died, Basta served in a cavalry company run by his oldest brother Niccolò. In 1589, he married Anne de Liedekerke de Gavre, with whom he had 5 children: Charles, Georges, Demetrius, Ferdinand and Madeleine.

He began his military career in Flanders, where the young officer impressed Don John of Austria, and gained the governorship of Nivelles. In 1577 he joined the forces of Alexander Farnese, Duke of Parma in Flanders. He led his army mainly on the French front during the War of the Three Henrys and the Catholic League. In 1584, Basta gained his first major victory when his troops were blocking communications between Malines and Antwerp. Similarly, during the siege of Brussels which ended with a capitulation of the besiegers in March 1585, Basta led the blockade of the city. During the end of the year, the commander led the cavalry of the expeditionary body, which at Charles de Mansfeld's orders.... When the Catholics, in 1589, marched to retake Paris, it was the cavalry led by Basta who rescued the back of the Spanish army from the sudden attack of Henry of Navarre.

He returned to France in 1591 and partook in the siege of Rouen with the rank of Commander General of the cavalry. He, however, was almost killed by Sir Roger Williams, who sliced his neck in personal combat. In February 1592, he separated Navarre from his greater army, and the prince fled capture by his forces. He was tasked with ensuring communications between Rouen and the Netherlands, which was massively threatened by the French army, and then protecting the retreat of the Spaniards after the injury of Alexander Farnese in Caudebec.

In 1596, after the death of the Duke of Parma, Basta followed the fate of many Italian princes and had to abandon the Spanish. He then went to the service of Emperor Rudolf II, on the recommendation of Philip II. Rudolph II named Basta general of his light cavalry and made him a knight of the Order of the Golden Spur on February 16, 1598. He served as general master in the army of Archbishop Mattia, later deputy governor of Upper Hungary, and finally the commander of the armies of Hungary and Transylvania. Ambrogio Merodio, in his Istoria Tarantina, calls him the "terror of Ottoman armies".

For more than a decade, Basta fought against Hungarians, Transylvanians, Vlachs, and Tatars, gaining much fame as one as the best generals of the Empire. In 1597 he was released, together with General Schwarzenberg, from Pápa, which was conquered three years earlier by the Turks. In 1597, while he was deputy governor of Hungary, he recaptured the city of Huszt, which had rebelled against the Empire.

At the Battle of Mirăslău, Michael the Brave was defeated by Basta, forcing Michael to appeal to the Emperor Rudolf II to mediate the dispute with Basta.

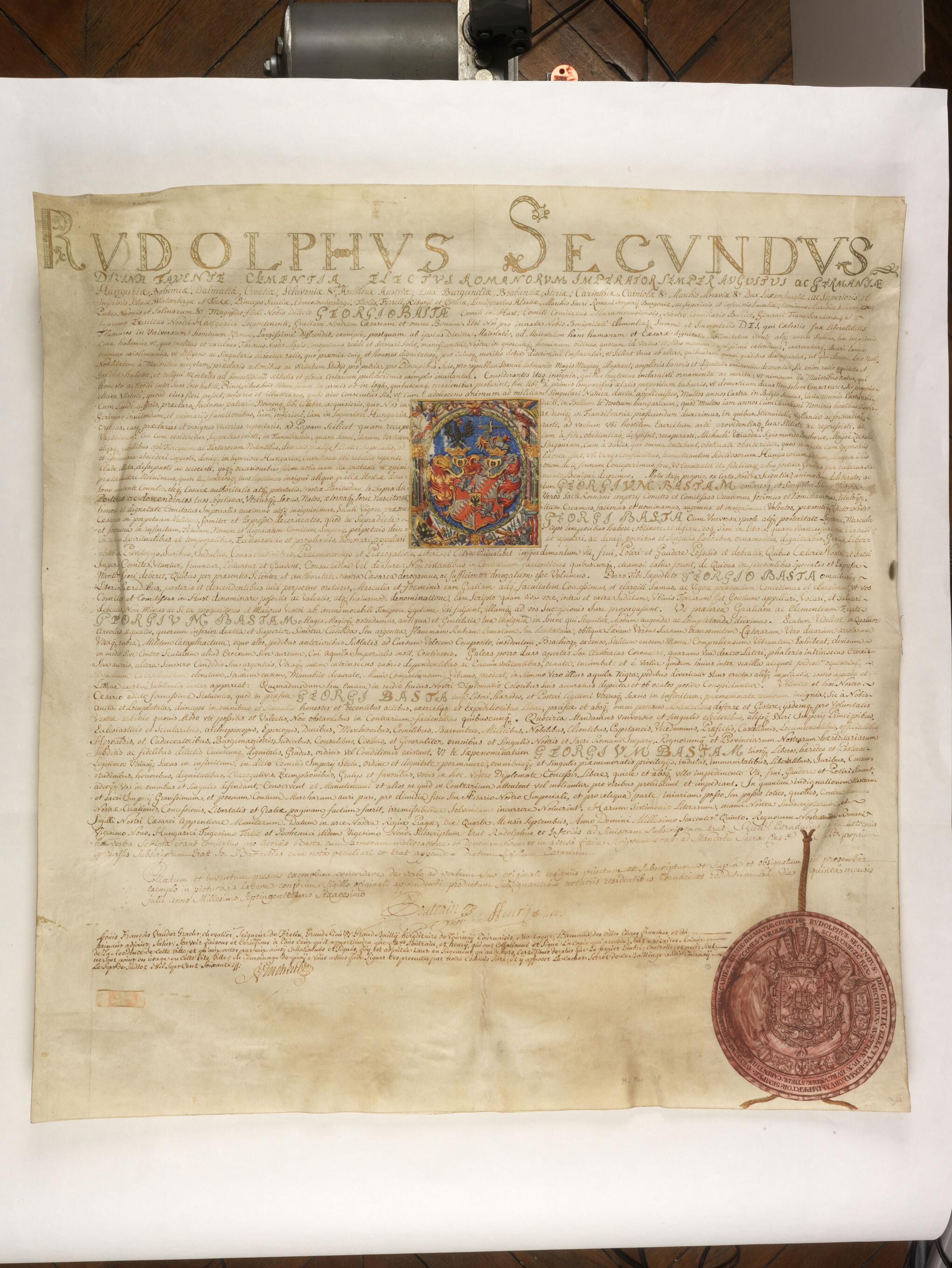
Charter issued to Giorgio Basta, Count of Hust, by Rudolf II, Holy Roman Emperor in 1605

Under his command, his ally Michael the Brave, the former ruler of Transylvania, Wallachia and Moldavia, was assassinated at Keresztesmező camp, near Aranyosgyéres (now Câmpia Turzii, Câmpia Turzii), because Basta considered him a liability. The event happened on 9 August 1601, only days after a joint victory in the Battle of Guruslău. Following the murder of Michael and his victory over Báthory, Basta became the military commander of Transylvania, but his cruelty led to public discontent. Under his leadership, iniquities and murders multiplied throughout Transylvania. During this brief period, Basta tried to uproot Protestantism. Following Papal and Imperial policy, Calvinist Hungarians and Székelys, Orthodox Wallachians and Serbs, and Lutheran Saxons were subject to any kind of abuse. Following years of warfare and his ruthless regime, famine and plague appeared in Transylvania. At that time Rudolf II decided to recall him from command, leading to Basta's departure from Transylvania and put him in charge of fighting against the Ottomans of West Hungary (1604). He successfully defended Esztergom with his 10,000 mercenaries against 80,000 Ottomans.

After Bocskai's uprisen army chased away Belgiojoso, Rudolph sent Basta from West-Hungary to the Partium to suppress the uprising. In November 1604, Basta twice defeated forces led by Stephen Bocskai (see also: Bocskai Uprising). Bocskai, in the end, cut his supplies, and he had to withdraw in winter to Eperjes where he got trapped. After some months, Rudolph called him back to defend at first the mining towns (e.g. Besztercebánya) in Upper-Hungary, Moravia and Austria against Bocskai's looting armies.

In July 1605, he did not get enough money to keep up enough mercenaries to defend Visegrád, Esztergom and Érsekújvár against the Ottomans and was defeated by Lalla Mehmed. The Military Committee did not supply him enough money but Rudolph II made him a Czech baron to compensate. The court became tired of the war, and they started pushing aside Basta after the Treaty of Vienna and Treaty of Zsitvatorok, and they didn't even want to pay him their debt. He claimed 380,000 Thaler debt from the court (80 000 wages of mercenaries came from his own pocket). In his last four years, he did not get his payment and was not even invited to the Military Committee.

After his experiences of warfare in Eastern Europe, he went to Prague. On April 17, 1606, Pope Paul V pronounced an interdict against the Republic of Venice. On February 26, 1607, Basta was named lieutenant general of the Holy Church. The Venetian interdict, having been cancelled on 21 April 1607, Basta will never take command effectively.

Basta died in Prague on 20 November 1607.

Basta wrote several military manuals, the best known of which are his Il maestro di campo generale...(Venice 1606), and his posthumous work Il governo della cavalleria leggiera (Venice 1612). Both were translated into German and into French.

== Contributions and military style ==
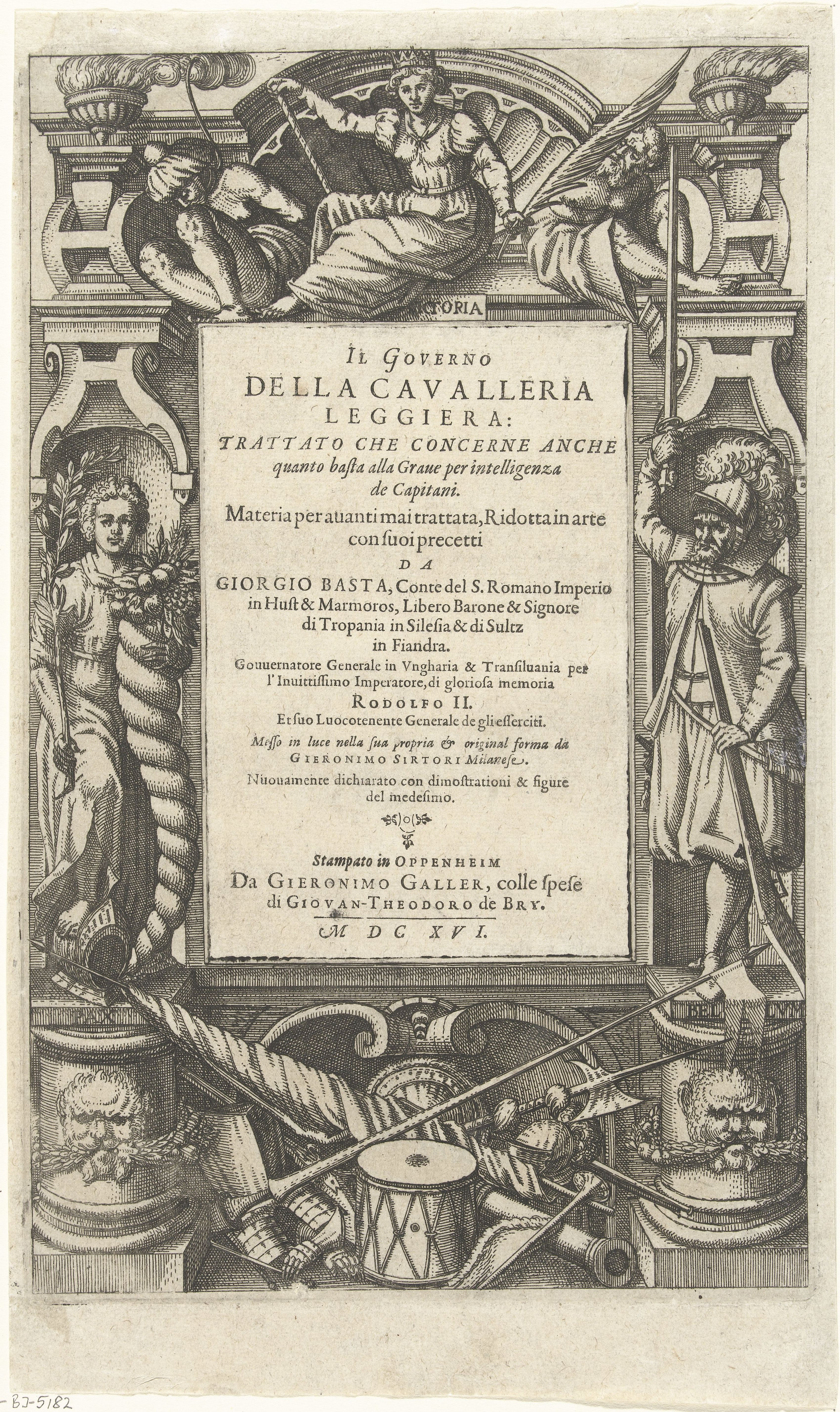
Giorgio Basta, Il Governo Della Cavalleria Leggiera: Trattato Che Concerne Anche quanto basta alla Grave per intelligenza de Capitani. Oppenheim: H. Galler, J.T. de Bry, 1616.

Basta was born into a period of transition from the traditional sword and shield to the gun. And cavalry switched from the Gendarme to lighter and armed cavalrymen, which valued quick cavalry charges. Due to the influence of his father, he was a very strict observer of the rules and the laws of a militia. When he worked for Alexander, Duke of Parma, he was responsible for the renewal and restructuring of the cavalry weapon. However, during his early years, Basta experimented with his personal method of "mobile sculptures", which were small and numerous groups of cavalrymen who pushed in the forefront of the army, so as to create a complete "crown" in continuous movement; The method assured the army of sudden destructive capability and gave fruit in the French countryside.

The government of light cavalry is doubtless the most important work of Basta, as it represents the first organic regulation of light cavalry in Europe. Basta's theories led to the cavalry being released from its close ties with infantry, according to previous military tactics. To a degree, Basta's work is also largely anticipatory of further developments, especially in the concept of light cavalry being "the pupil of the armies" and in the reiterated need for a constant coordination of cavalry movements with those of other weapons : Theories, which influenced Raimondo Montecuccoli. Interesting remarks are made by Basta regarding the choice of cavalry officers to be performed not according to the nobility titles, but on a more meritocratic internship through the various degrees of the militia. He wants the captain to have absolute authority over all officers, "but always with the advice of the commissioner"; For the lieutenant requires a mature age, which can guarantee "credit and authority on the soldiers"; Young people must be standard bearers, for the pursuit and adventurous spirit. Those carrying the banner must "have in their heads the guidance of all the others." Particular care is given by Basta to the question of the armament of soldiers. The Blunderbuss should be equipped with an arbutus to carry with a shoulder strap and a short sword, which allows to hit the tip, more timely and more effectively, according to the dictates of the Italian school, rather than cutting. Among the Blunderbuss, who must be young and robust in shape, Basta values particularly Flemish to be best, not Italians, who prefer military in infantry.

The main quality of the lancers' wards must be, according to Basta, "velocity and collision velocity, i.e. velocity joint mass"; The gun armour is, besides the spear, a short sword for the tip and picks that "can greatly benefit in retreat." On the "rules of residence", Basta illustrates the rules already dictated by Alessandro Farnese: the commissioner. It has to carry out topographic surveys and deal with all the logistical problems with the help of a "forier major", also providing the surveillance system for the equinox. Another important chapter is the one devoted to remote viewing, which Basta underlines as one of the main tasks of the cavalry. In this part, he sets out with great precision the various procedures to be followed to surprise a large army of enemies. Especially of personal experiences in the Netherlands and France, although he attributes the merit of introducing this use of cavalry to the Duke of Alba. Finally, Basta deals with the tactical organization of light cavalry in combat, recommending the crescent moon, rather than the manipulative ones, in lines, in chessboard, in columns.

== Gallery ==
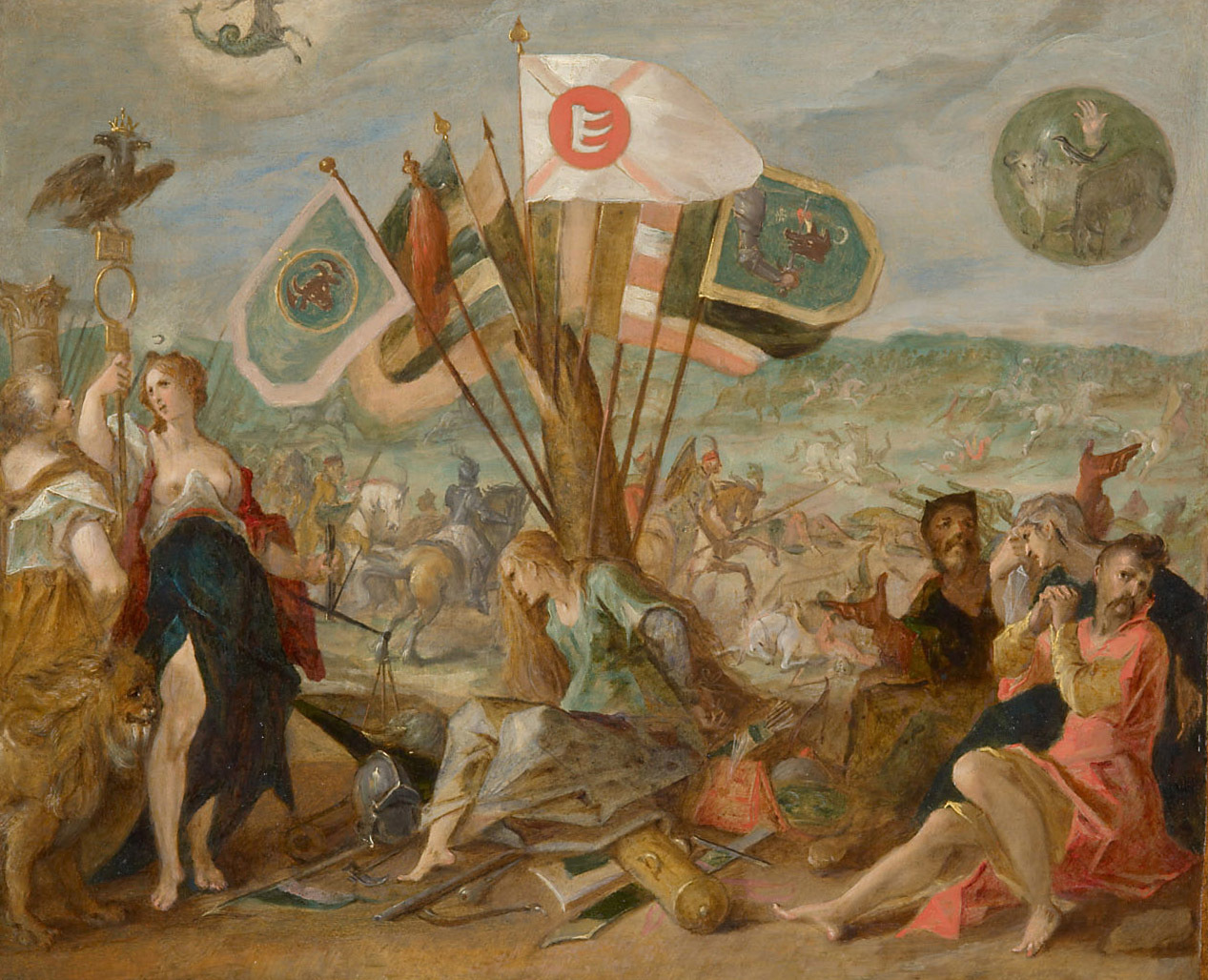
Battle of Guruslău

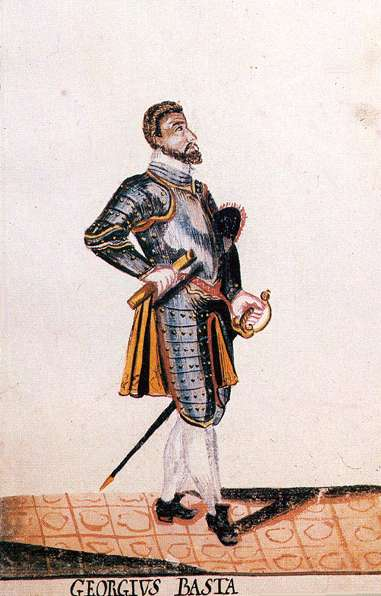
17th century aquarell of Basta

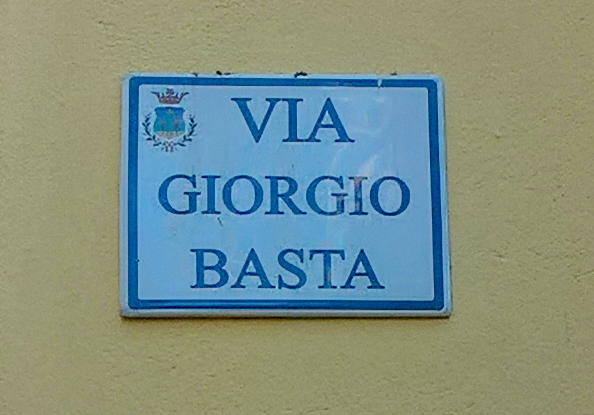
Street sign in Brindisi Montagna

== See also ==
- Ottoman wars in Europe
- French Wars of Religion
