= Early modern Romania =

National time period

Romania in the Early Modern Period began after the death of Michael the Brave, who ruled in a personal union, Wallachia, Transylvania, and Moldavia – three principalities in the lands that now form Romania – in 1600. The three principalities were subjected to the Ottoman Empire, and paid a yearly tribute to the Ottoman Sultans, but they preserved their internal autonomy. In contrast, Dobruja, the Banat, southern part of Crișana, and the cities of Giurgiu and Brăila were fully incorporated into the Ottoman Empire.

The Eastern Orthodox princes of Wallachia and Moldavia ruled their realms with absolute power, but the boyars took control of state administration in the 1660s and 1670s. The growing influence of Greeks (who administered state revenues and seized landed estates) caused bitter conflicts in both principalities. Due to extensive taxation, the peasants often rebelled against their lords. The long reign of Matei Basarab in Wallachia and of Vasile Lupu in Moldavia contributed to the development of local economy (especially mining and commerce). Most princes of Wallachia and Moldavia also paid tribute to the princes of Transylvania. The latter administered their realm in cooperation with the Diet, composed of the representatives of the Hungarian noblemen, the Transylvanian Saxons, and the Székelys and of delegates appointed by the monarchs. In the principality, Catholicism, Lutheranism, Calvinism, and Unitarianism enjoyed an official status. Romanians had no representatives in the Diet and their Eastern Orthodox religion was only tolerated. The three outstanding princes – the Calvinist Stephen Bocskai, Gabriel Bethlen, and George I Rákóczi – expanded their countries and defended the liberties of the Estates in Royal Hungary against the Habsburgs in the first half of the 17th century.

During this period the lands inhabited by Romanians were characterised by the slow disappearance of the feudal system, by the leadership of some rulers like Dimitrie Cantemir in Moldavia, Constantin Brâncoveanu in Wallachia, Gabriel Bethlen in Transylvania, the Phanariot Epoch, and the appearance of the Russian Empire as a political and military influence.

== Background ==
The lands that now form Romania were divided among various polities in the Middle Ages. Banat, Crişana, Maramureş and Transylvania were integrated into the Kingdom of Hungary. Wallachia and Moldavia developed into independent principalities in the 14th century. Dobruja emerged as an autonomous realm after the disintegration of Bulgaria in the 1340s.

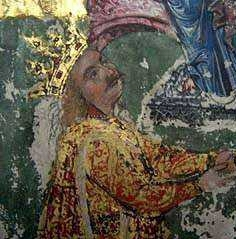
Stephen the Great, Prince of Moldavia, a leading figure of the anti-Ottoman struggles – miniature from the 1473 Gospel at Humor Monastery

In accordance with the Byzantine political traditions, the princes of Wallachia and Moldavia were autocrats who ruled with absolute power. Any male member of the royal families could be elected prince, which caused internal strives, giving pretext to the neighboring powers for intervention. Most princes of Wallachia accepted the suzerainty of the kings of Hungary; the Moldavian monarchs preferred to yield to the kings of Poland. Royal councils – which consisted of the logofăt, the vornic, and other high officials – assisted the monarchs, but the princes could also discuss the most important matters at the assembly of the Orthodox clergy, the boyars and the army. The Orthodox Church, especially the monasteries, held extensive domains in both principalities. The boyars were landowners who enjoyed administrative and judicial immunities. A group of free peasants (known as răzeşi in Wallachia and moşneni in Moldavia) existed in each principality, but the princes' most subjects were serfs – the rumâni in Wallachia, and the vecini in Moldavia – who paid tithes or provided specific services to their lords. Gypsy slaves also played an eminent role in the economy, especially as black-smiths, basket-makers, and gold-washers. The Kingdom of Hungary were divided into counties. The heads of most counties were directly subordinated to the sovereign, with the exception of the seven Transylvanian counties which were under the authority of a higher royal official, the voivode. Assemblies of noblemen were the most important administrative bodies in the counties; in Transylvania, the voivodes held joint assemblies. In theory, all noblemen enjoyed the same privileges, for instance, they were exempted of taxes. However, the so-called conditional nobles – including the Romanian cneazes and the nobles of the Church – did not have the same liberties: they paid taxes or rendered specific services either to the monarch or to their lords. The Transylvanian Saxons, whose territories were divided into seats, formed an autonomous community which remained independent of the authority of the voivodes. The Hungarian-speaking Székelys, who lived in the easternmost part of Transylvania, were also organized into seats. On 16 September 1437 the Transylvanian noblemen and the heads of the Saxon and Székely communities concluded an alliance – the Union of the Three Nations – against the Hungarian and Romanian peasants who had risen up in open rebellion. This Union developed into the constitutional framework of the administration of Transylvania in the next decades. Within the peasantry, Romanians had a special position, for instance, they did not pay the ecclesiastic tithe, payable by all Catholic peasants.

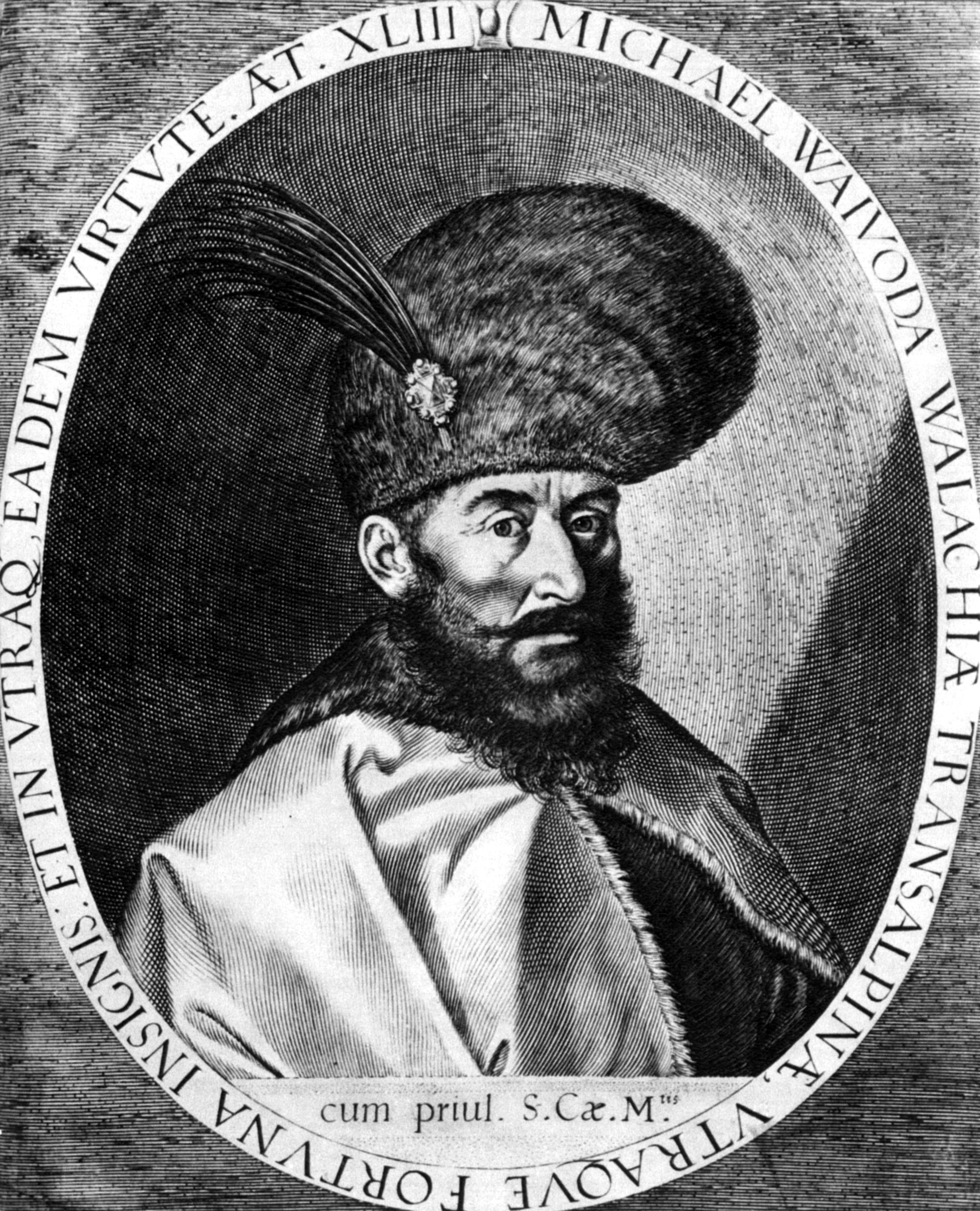
Michael the Brave – the union of Wallachia, Transylvania and Moldavia between May and September 1600 under his rule served as a precedent for the unification of the lands inhabited by Romanians in the 19th century

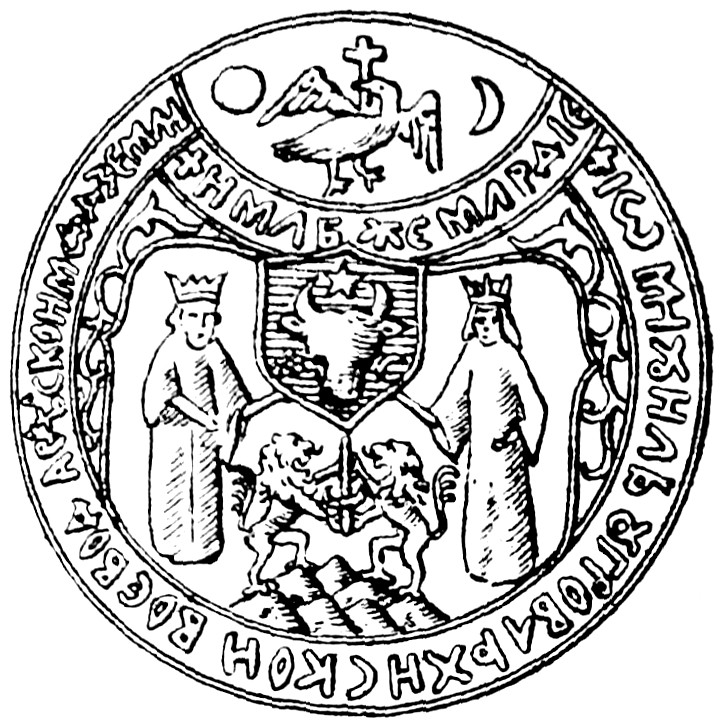
Seal of Michael the Brave used when he ruled Wallachia, Transylvania and Moldavia

The expansion of the Ottoman Empire reached the Danube around 1390. The Ottomans invaded Wallachia in 1390 and occupied Dobruja in 1395. Wallachia paid tribute to the Ottomans for the first time in 1417, Moldavia in 1456. However, the two principalities were not annexed, their princes were only required to assist the Ottomans in their military campaigns. The most outstanding 15th-century Romanian monarchs – Vlad the Impaler of Wallachia and Stephen the Great of Moldavia – were even able to defeat the Ottomans in major battles. In Dobruja, which was included in the Silistra Eyalet, Nogai Tatars settled and the local Gypsy tribes converted to Islam.

The disintegration of the Kingdom of Hungary started with the Battle of Mohács on 29 August 1526. The Ottomans annihilated the royal army and Louis II of Hungary perished. Rivalries between the partisans of the two newly elected kings – John Zápolya and Ferdinand of Habsburg – caused a civil war. Ferdinand I's attempt to reunite the country after Zápolya's death provoked a new Ottoman campaign. The Ottomans seized Buda, the capital of Hungary, on 29 August 1541, but the Ottoman Sultan Suleiman the Magnificent granted the lands east of the river Tisza to Zápolya's infant son, John Sigismund Zápolya. The war between the two kings continued, enabling the Ottomans to expand their rule. The greater part of Banat fell to the Ottomans and was transformed into an Ottoman province centered in Timişoara in 1552.

Reformation spread in the lands under the rule of John Sigismund. The Diet of Turda of 1568 declared that the "faith is a gift of God", allowing each village to freely elect their pastors. In practise, only four denominations – Catholicism, Lutheranism, Calvinism, and Unitarianism – enjoyed a privileged status. Orthodoxy and Judaism were only tolerated, and all other denominations were forbidden. The Reformation also contributed to the spread and development of vernacular literature. The first Romanian book (a Lutheran cathecism) was printed in Sibiu in 1544. Decrees passed at the Diet of Transylvania were published in Hungarian from 1565. John Sigismund renounced the title of king and adopted the new title of "Prince of Transylvania and parts of the Kingdom of Hungary" on 16 August 1570.

The Romanian historian Nicolae Iorga described Wallachia and Moldavia as Byzantium after Byzantium. Indeed, especially after the disintegration of the Kingdom of Hungary, Byzantine cultural influence increased in both principalities. Their rulers, who remained the only Orthodox monarchs in Southeastern Europe, adopted the elements of the protocol of the one-time imperial court of Constantinople and supported Orthodox institutions throughout the Ottoman Empire. The international status of the two principalities also changed in the 1530s and 1540s. Although neither Wallachia nor Moldavia were integrated into the Dar al-Islam, or "The Domain of Islam", the influence of the Ottoman Empire increased and the princes were prohibited to conclude treaties with foreign powers. The Ottomans also hindered the princes from coining money, for which the use of foreign currency (especially Ottoman, Polish, Austrian, Venetian and Dutch coins) became widespread in Moldavia and Wallachia.

A new war – the so-called Fifteen Years' War – broke out between the Ottoman Empire and the Habsburgs in 1591. Sigismund Báthory, prince of Transylvania, entered into an alliance with Rudolph II, Holy Roman Emperor in 1595. Michael the Brave, prince of Wallachia, accepted Báthory's suzerainty, agreeing that the Diet of Transylvania would introduce taxes in Wallachia. Ştefan Răzvan, prince of Moldavia, also swore loyalty to Báthory who thus became the sovereign of the three principalities. However, Ştefan Răzvan was soon dethroned, the Ottomans routed the Christian army in the Battle of Mezőkeresztes in October 1596 and Báthory abdicated in favor of Emperor Rudolph in April 1598. Michael the Brave accepted the emperor's suzerainty, but Sigismund Báthory's cousin, Andrew Báthory, who seized Transylvania with Polish assistance, yielded to the Ottomans in the name of the three principalities in 1599.

Michael the Brave invaded Transylvania and defeated Andrew Báthory in the Battle of Şelimbăr on 28 October 1599. He entered Alba Iulia where the Diet recognized him as the Emperor's lieutenant. Michael the Brave also occupied Moldavia in May 1600, uniting the three principalities under his rule. However, the Transylvanian noblemen rose up against Michael the Brave and defeated him in the Battle of Mirăslău on 18 September 1600. The Poles invaded Moldavia and Wallachia, assisting Ieremia Movilă and Simion Movilă to seize these principalities. Michael the Brave tried to return with Emperor Rudolph's assistance, but he was murdered on 19 August 1601 near Câmpia Turzii at the orders of Giorgio Basta, the commander of the imperial troops. The noblemen and nearly contemporaneous Hungarian and Saxon historians described Michael the Brave as a tyrant, willing to destroy the landowners with the assistance of Romanian and Székely commoners. On the other hand, the personal union of Wallachia, Transylvania and Moldavia under his rule "became a symbol of Romanian national destiny" (the unification of the lands inhabited by Romanians) in the 19th century.

== End of the Fifteen Years War (1601–1606) ==
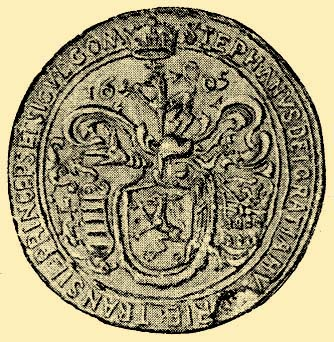
Seal of Stephen Bocskay, "By the Grace of God, Prince of Hungary and Transylvania, Count of the Székelys"

In Transylvania, extensive taxation, unpaid mercenaries' plundering raids, and attempts to spread Catholicism characterized the rule of Rudolph II's representatives. The Ottomans supported pretenders, including Sigismund Báthory and Mózes Székely, who tried to expel the imperial troops. In Wallachia, Radu Șerban – the father-in-law of Michael the Brave's son – seized the throne with Rudolph II's support in July 1602. A year later, he invaded Transylvania, defeated Mózes Székely and administered the principality in Emperor Rudolph's name until Giorgio Basta returned in September. Moldavia remained under the rule of Ieremia Movilă who attempted to forge a reconciliation between the Ottomans and Poland.

The changes and wars have turned [Transylvania] into desert. The boroughs and villages have been burned, most of the inhabitants and their cattle killed or driven away. In consequence, taxes, excise, bridge and road tolls yield but little, the mines are deserted, there are no hands to work.

— Giorgio Basta's letter of 1603

An Italian imperial commander, Giacomo Belgiojoso, accused a wealthy Calvinist landowner, Stephen Bocskay, of treachery and ordered the forfeiture of his estates in Crişana in October 1604. Bocskay hired at least 5,000 Hajduks – a group of mainly Calvinist runaway serfs and noblemen who had settled in the borderlands – and rose up in open rebellion. After Sultan Ahmed I appointed Bocskay prince of Transylvania, the Three Nations swore loyalty to him on 14 September 1605. Bocskay's army invaded Royal Hungary and Austria, forcing the Habsburgs to sign the Peace of Vienna on 23 June 1606. Rudolph II confirmed Bocskay's title of prince of Transylvania and granted four counties in Upper Hungary to him.

The Fifteen Years' War ended with the Peace of Zsitvatorok, which was signed in November 1606. According to the treaty, Rudolph II acknowledged that the princes of Transylvania were subjected to the Sultans. Bocskay, who had realized that only the autonomous status of Transylvania guaranteed the preservation of the liberties of the noblemen in Royal Hungary, emphasized that "as long as the Hungarian Crown is with a nation mightier than ours, with the Germans, ... it will be necessary and expedient to have a Hungarian prince in Transylvania". Bocskay died childless on 29 December 1606.

=== Social changes after 1601 ===
During Michael the Brave's brief tenure and the early years of Turkish suzerainty, the distribution of land in Wallachia and Moldavia changed dramatically. Over the years, Wallachian and Moldavian princes made land grants to loyal boyars in exchange for military service so that by the 17th century hardly any land was left to be granted. Boyars in search of wealth began encroaching on peasant land and their military allegiance to the prince weakened. As a result, serfdom spread, successful boyars became more courtiers than warriors, and an intermediary class of impoverished lesser nobles developed. Would-be princes were forced to raise enormous sums to bribe their way to power, and peasant life grew more miserable as taxes and exactions increased. Any prince wishing to improve the peasants' lot risked a financial shortfall that could enable rivals to out-bribe him at the Porte and usurp his position.

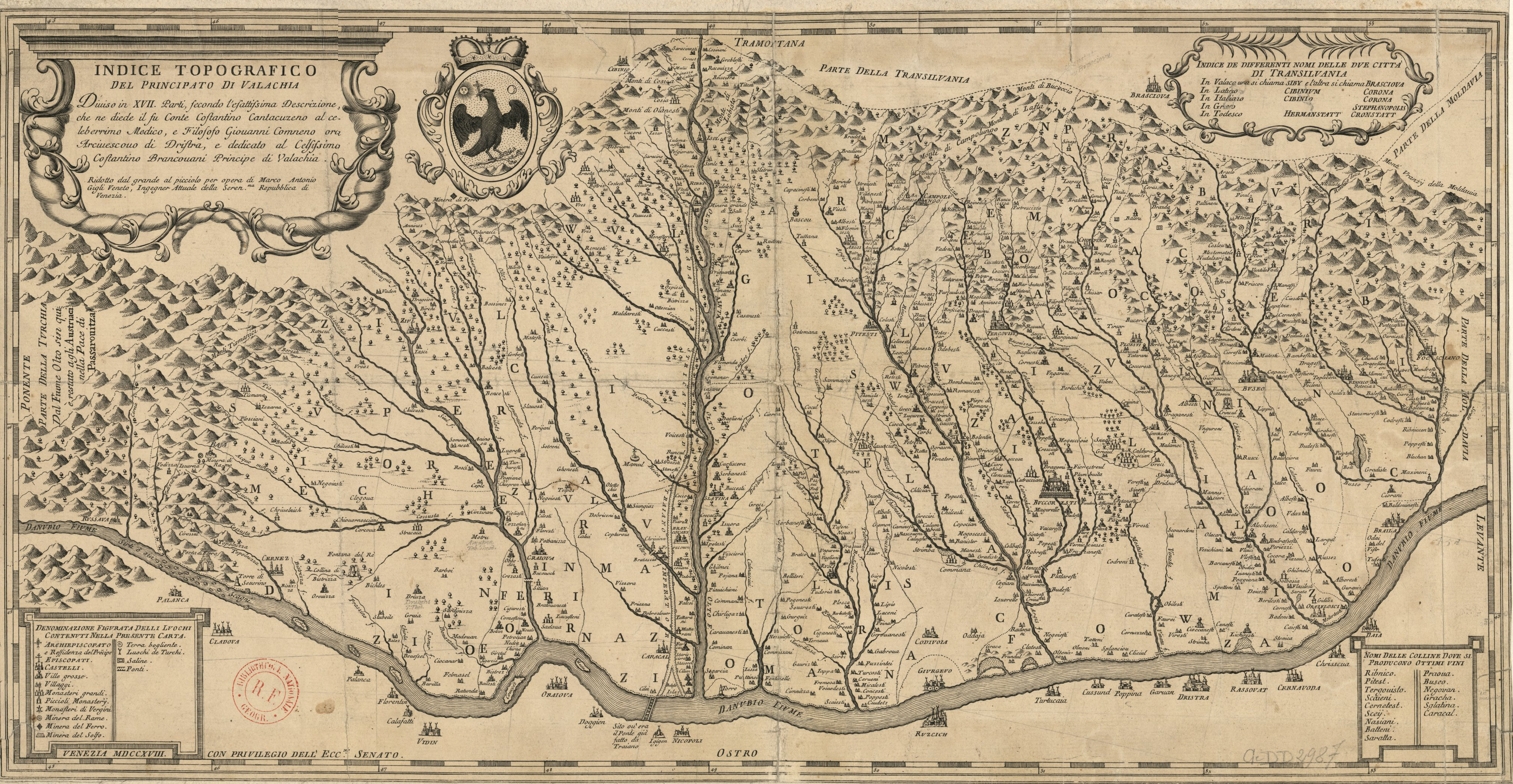
Wallachia. Map by Constantin Cantacuzino

According to the treaties (Capitulations) between the Romanian Principalities (Wallachia and Moldavia), Turkish subjects were not allowed to settle in the Principalities, to own land, to build houses or mosques, or to marry. In spite of this restrictions imposed on the Turks, the princes allowed Greek and Turkish merchants and usurers to exploit the principalities' riches.

== The three principalities under Ottoman rule ==
=== Principality of Transylvania (1606–1688) ===
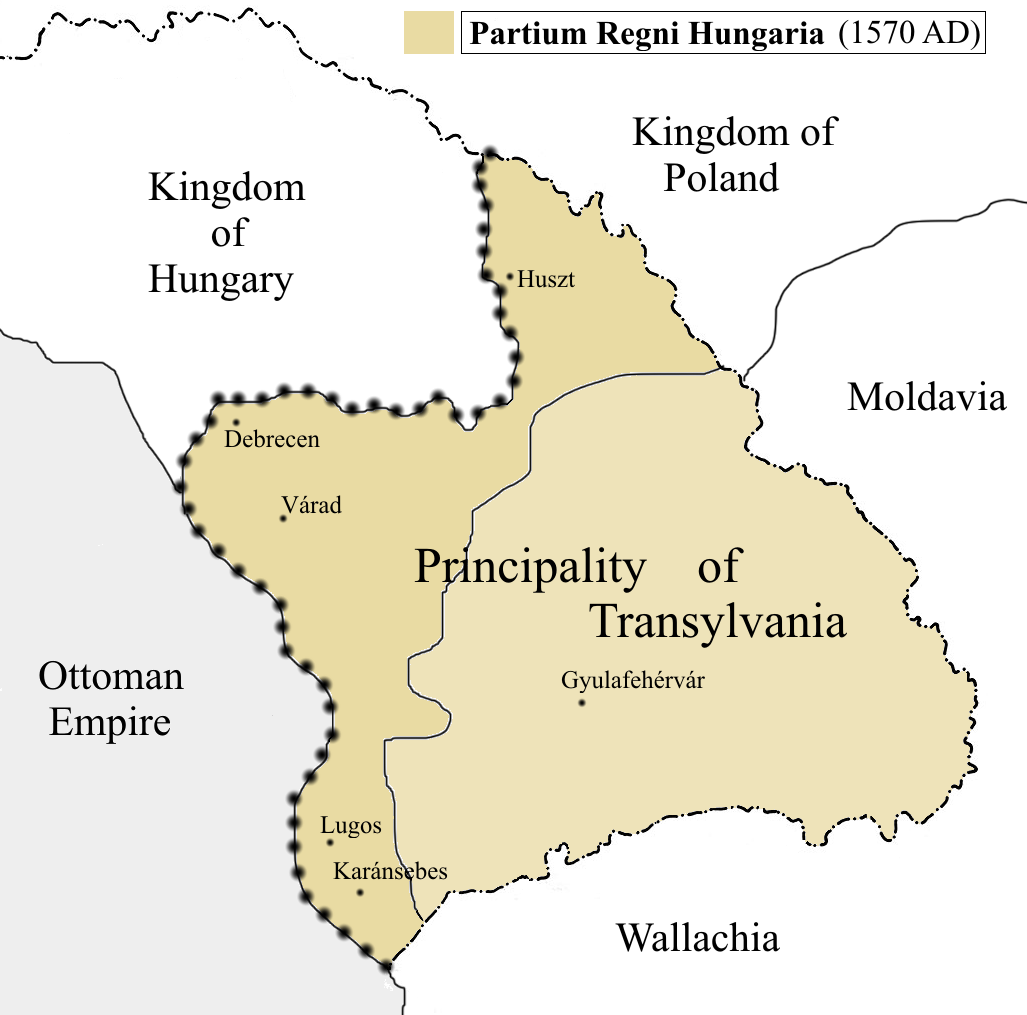
The Principality of Transylvania in 1570: Transylvania proper and the Partium

Long winters and rainy summers with frequent floodings featured the "Little Ice Age" in 17th-century Transylvania. Because of the short autumns, arable lands on the plateaus were transformed into grazing lands. The Fifteen Years' War had caused a demographic catastrophe. For instance, the population decreased with about 80% in the lowland villages and with about 45% in the mountains in Solnocul de Mijloc and Dăbâca Counties during the wars; the two most important Saxon centers, Sibiu and Brașov, lost more than 75% of their burghers. The Diets often passed decrees that prescribed the return of runaway serfs to their lords or granted a six-year tax holiday for new settlers, but such decrees became rare from the 1620s, suggesting that a demographic regeneration had occurred in the meantime. Nevertheless, epidemics – measles and bubonic plague – which returned in each decade killed many peoples during the century.

Bocskay designated a wealthy baron from Upper Hungary, Valentin Drugeth, as his successor. The Ottomans supported Drugeth, but a member of the royal Báthory family, Gabriel Báthory, also claimed the throne. Taking advantage of the two claimants' rivalry, the Diet elected Sigismund Rákóczi prince in early 1607. A year later, Gabriel Báthory made an alliance with the Hajduks, forced Rákóczi to renounce and seized the throne. Upon the Hajduk's demand, he promised that he would never secede from the Holy Crown of Hungary. Radu Șerban of Wallachia and Constantin Movilă of Moldavia swore loyalty to Báthory. Báthory's erratic behavior alienated both his subjects and the neighboring powers: he captured Sibiu and Brașov, and invaded Wallachia without the Sultan's approval. The Sublime Porte decided to dethrone him and dispatched Gabriel Bethlen to accomplish this task. Bethlen invaded Transylvania accompanied by Ottoman, Wallachian and Crimean Tatar troops. The Three Nations proclaimed him prince on 23 September 1613 and the Hajduks murdered his opponent.

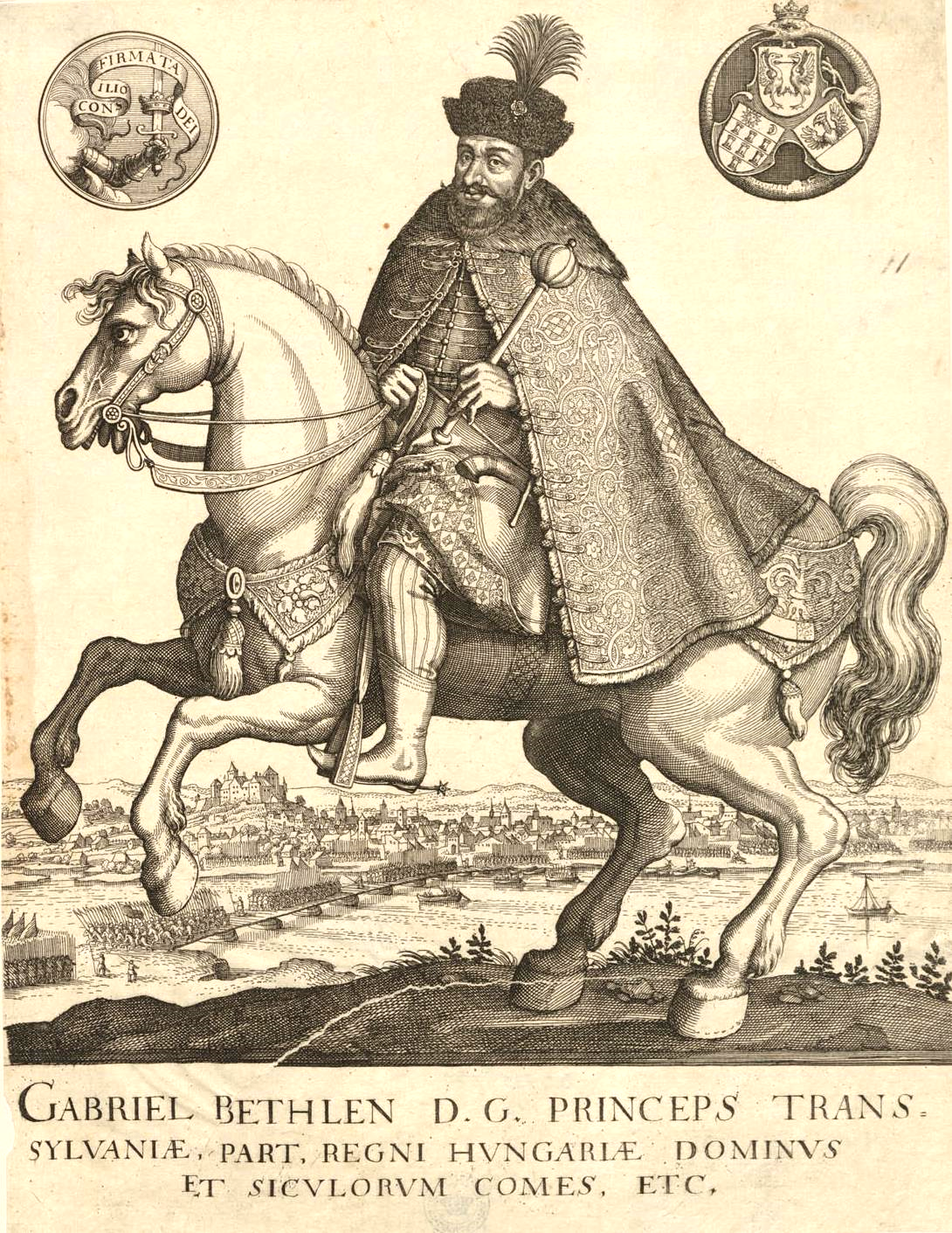
Gabriel Bethlen

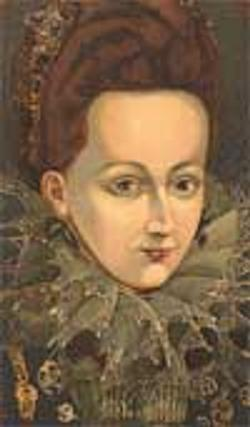
Gabriel Bethlen's widow and successor, Catherine of Brandenburg

Transylvania prospered during Bethlen's reign. He did not restrict the liberties of the Three Nations, but exercised royal prerogatives to limit their influence on state administration. From 1615 at least two-thirds of those who attended the Diet were delegates appointed by him. He introduced a mercantilist economic policy, encouraging the immigration of Jews and Baptist craftsmen from the Holy Roman Empire, creating state monopolies and promoting export. The Diet controlled only about 10% of state revenues – around 70,000 florins from the annual income of about 700,000 florins – from the 1620s. Bethlen set up a permanent army of mercenaries. He forbade Székely communers from choosing serfdom to avoid military service in 1619 and increased the tax payable by Székely serfs in 1623. He often granted nobility to serfs, but the Diet of 1619 requested him to stop this practise. The Diet also prohibited the Romanians from bearing arms in 1620 and 1623. Bethlen set up the first academy in Transylvania, promoted the building of schools and his subjects' studies abroad (especially in England), and punished those landowners who denied an education to children of serfs. Laws prohibiting religious innovations were repeated in 1618 and the Diet obliged the Sabbatarians – a community who adopted Jewish customs – to join one of the four official denominations. He planned to convert the Romanians to Calvinism and tried to convince Cyril Lucaris, Patriarch of Constantinople, to assist him, but the latter refused, emphasizing the "blood ties" between the Romanians of Transylvania, Wallachia and Moldavia. During the Thirty Years' War, Bethlen made an alliance with the Protestant Union and invaded Royal Hungary three times between 1619 and 1626. He was elected king of Hungary in August 1620, but a year later he renounced this title. In exchange, he received seven counties in Upper Hungary to rule during his lifetime.

Bethlen died on 15 November 1629. Conflicts between his widow and brother – Catherine of Brandenburg and Stephen Bethlen – enabled George Rákóczi, Sigismund Rákóczi's son, to claim the throne for himself. Rákóczi was proclaimed prince on 1 December 1630. He did not continue Bethlen's mercantilism: state monopolies were abolished and taxes were lowered. Instead, he expanded his own estates: he held 10 domains in 1630, but 18 years later he owned more than 30 large domains in Transylvania and Upper Hungary. Rákóczi often accused his opponents of high treason, which enabled him to seize their property. Especially Sabbatarian landowners were exposed to persecution. For the Sabbatarians' teachings were based on Anti-Trinitarian theology, Rákóczi introduced a state control over the Unitarian Church in 1638. Rákóczi invaded Royal Hungary and Moravia in 1644, but the Ottomans ordered him to retreat. Even so, Ferdinand III of Hungary agreed to grant him seven counties in Upper Hungary. Transylvania was included in the Peace of Westphalia among the allies of England and Sweden.

George I Rákóczi who died on 11 October 1648 was succeeded by his son, George II Rákóczi. During his reign, the codification of the laws of the principality was accomplished with the publication of a law book (the so-called Approbatae) in 1653. The Approbatae ordered the landowners to capture all runaway commoners (especially the Ruthenians, Romanians and Wallachians who wandered in the country) and to force them to settle in their estates as serfs, prohibited the Romanians and the peasants to bear arms and obliged all Romanians to pay the tithe. The Approbatae also contained derogatory statements about the Romanians, stating that they were "admitted into the county for the public good". Rákóczi who planned to acquire the Polish throne intervened in the Second Northern War on behalf of Sweden and invaded Poland in early 1657. The Poles routed Rákóczi and his Moldavian and Wallachian allies, forcing them to withdraw. On their route, a Crimean Tatar army annihilated Rákóczi's troops, capturing many of the leading noblemen.

Rákóczi's action infuriated the new Grand Vizier of the Ottoman Empire, Köprülü Mehmed Pasha, who ordered his deposition in October 1657. In the next years, princes supported by the Ottomans – Francis Rhédey, Ákos Barcsay, and Michael I Apafi – and their opponents – George II Rákóczi and John Kemény – fought against each other. During this period the Ottomans captured Ineu, Lugoj, Caransebeș, and Oradea, and destroyed Alba Iulia, the capital of the principality, and Crimean Tatars plundered the Székely Land. Although internal order was restored after John Kemény's death in a battle on 23 January 1662, Transylvania could never act as an independent state thereafter.

Michael Apafi, who had been elected prince upon the Ottomans' demand on 14 September 1661, closely cooperated with the Diet throughout his reign. He was the first prince to have invited the Orthodox bishop of Transylvania to the Diet. Apafi declared salt mining a state monopoly and introduced a system of tax farming, which increased state revenues. Upon his initiative, the decrees issued between 1653 and 1668 were revised and published in a new law code (the Compilatae) in early 1669. Leopold I, Holy Roman Emperor suspended the constitution of Royal Hungary and dismissed two-thirds of the Hungarian soldiers from the border forts. The dismissed soldiers – known as Kuruc – sought refuge in Transylvania. Louis XIV of France, who waged a war against the emperor along the Rhine, agreed to pay a subsidy to Apafi for his support of these outlaws in 1677 and 1678. Apafi was forced to join the Ottoman army marching against Vienna in summer 1683, but he returned to Transylvania soon after the Ottomans were defeated on 12 September. Upon Pope Innocent XI's initiative, Leopold I, John III Sobieski, King of Poland, and the Republic of Venice formed the Holy League against the Ottoman Empire in early next year. After the envoys of Apafi and Leopold I signed a treaty in Cârțișoara in spring 1685, Transylvania became a secret member of the alliance. According to the treaty, Apafi accepted the suzerainty of the Hungarian Crown, but Leopold I promised to respect the autonomous status of Transylvania. These provisions were repeated in a new agreement which was signed in Vienna on 28 June 1686, but the new treaty also prescribed that imperial troops should be garrisoned in Deva and Cluj. Although the Diet refused to confirm the agreement, Apafi allowed the imperial troops to winter in Transylvania after a series of victories of the united army of the Holy League in autumn 1687. Even so, Apafi did not fail to send the yearly tribute to the Sublime Porte at the end of the year. Antonio Caraffa, commander of the imperial troops, forced the Three Nations to acknowledge the Habsburgs' hereditary rule and to allow to garrison imperial troops in the main towns. The burghers of Baia Mare, Brașov, Bistrița, and Sibiu denied to yield, but Caraffa submitted them by force in February 1688. Leopold I was only willing to confirm the freedom of religion when Transylvanian delegates reminded him to his previous promises.

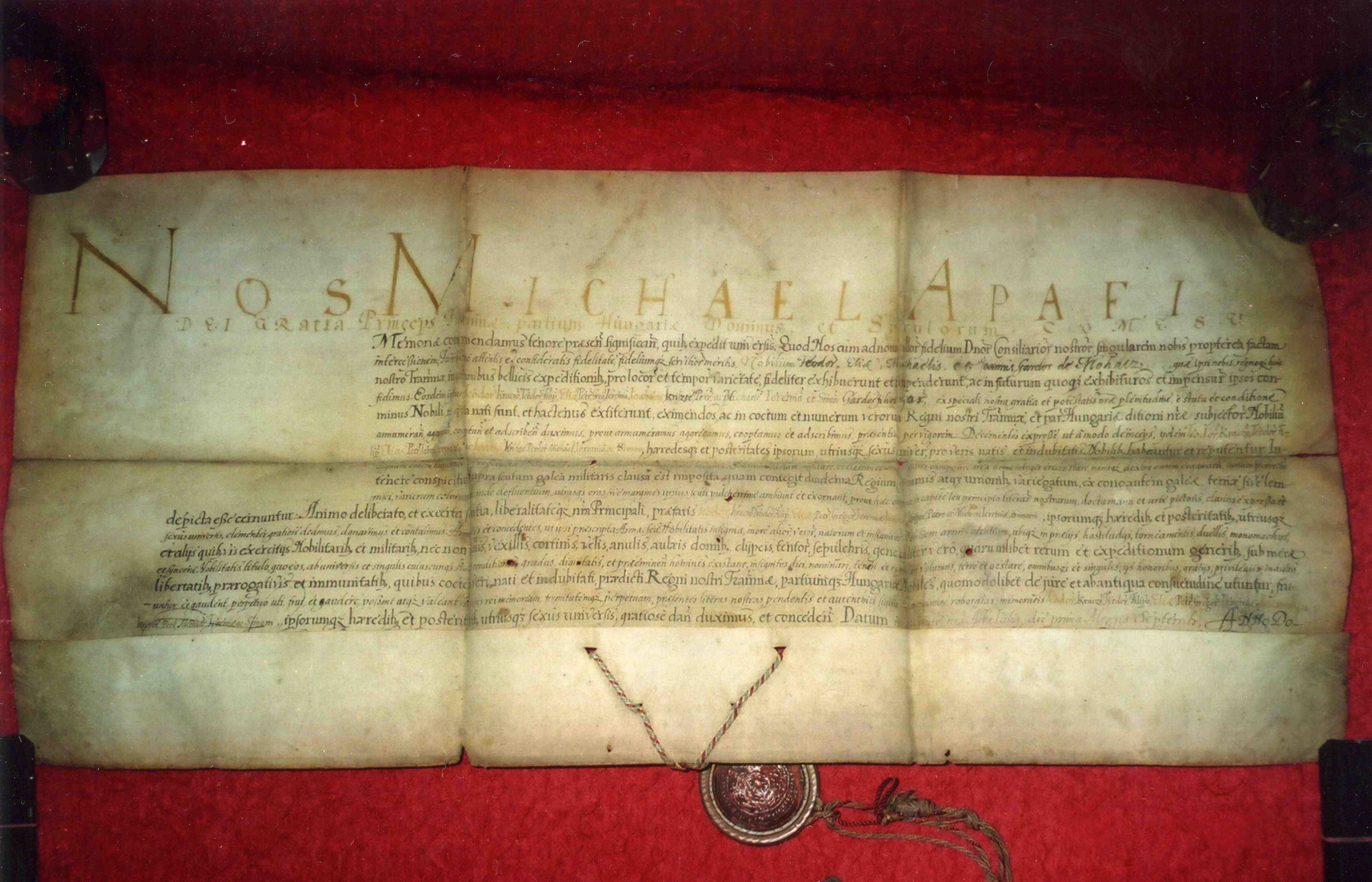
Michael I Apafi's grant of nobility

New species of domesticated plants were introduced in Transylvania in the 17th century. Maize, which was first recorded in 1611, became a popular food in this period. Tobacco was cultivated from the second half of the century, but the Diet passed decrees to regulate smoking already in 1670. Hops was introduced in the mountainous parts in the late 17th century. Mining, which had declined in the previous centuries, flourished during Gabriel Bethlen's reign. The Diet of 1618 decreed that both local and foreign miners could freely open new mines and exempted them of taxation. Besides gold, silver and iron, mercury extracted at Abrud and Zlatna became an important source of state revenues. Settlements destroyed during the Fifteen Years' War were restored between 1613 and 1648. Because of the spread of Renaissance architecture, the towns lost their medieval character in this period. For instance, squares decorated with fountains or statues and parks were established in Alba Iulia and Gilău, Cluj. The villages also transformed: traditional huts disappeared and the new houses were divided into several rooms. Excursions in the countryside became popular among townspeople in this century.

=== Wallachia (1606–1688) ===
Radu Șerban concluded treaties with Sigismund Rákóczi and Gabriel Bethlen. However, the latter invaded Wallachia, forcing Radu Șerban to flee in December 1610. For Radu Șerban had adopted an anti-Ottoman policy, the Sublime Porte assisted Radu Mihnea in seizing the throne in 1611. Most boyars supported the new prince, which enabled him to repel Radu Șerban's attacks between 1611 and 1616. The immigration of Greeks on a grand scale started during Radu Mihnea's reign. Their financial background enabled them to buy landed property and acquire boyar status.

The Sublime Porte transferred Radu Mihnea to Moldavia and appointed Alexandru Iliaș prince of Wallachia in 1616. Two years later, the new ruler's blatant favoritism towards the Greeks caused an uprising during which the discontented native noblemen, who were led by Lupu Mehedițeanu, murdered Greek landowners and merchants. The turmoil enabled Gabriel Movilă to seize the throne. He was expelled in 1620 by Radu Mihnea, who thus united Wallachia and Moldavia under his rule. The Ottoman Sultan Osman II invaded Poland and laid siege to Hotin (now Khotyn in Ukraine) in September 1621. After the Poles relieved the fort, Radu Mihnea who had accompanied the Sultan mediated a peace treaty between the two parties. Radu Mihnea appointed his son, Alexandru Coconul, prince of Wallachia in 1623. Four years later Alexandru Iliaș seized the throne for the second time.

During the reign of Leon Tomșa, who mounted the throne in 1629, a new anti-Greek uprising started. On 19 July 1631 the rebellious boyars, who were supported by George I Rákóczi, forced Leon Tomșa to expel all Greeks who had not married a local woman and did not held landed property in Wallachia. The prince also exempted the boyars of taxation and confirmed their property rights. A year later, the Sublime Porte dethroned Leon Tomșa and appointed Alexandru Iliaș's son, Radu Iliaș, prince. In fear of growing Greek influence, the boyars offered the throne to one of their number, Matei Brâncoveanu, in August 1632. Matei Brâncoveanu, who had fled to Transylvania during Leon Tomșa's reign, returned to Wallachia and defeated Radu Iliaș at Plumbuita in October. He convinced the Sublime Porte to confirm his rule; in exchange, he had to increase the amount of the yearly tribute from 45,000 to 135,000 thalers. Stating that he was a grandson of a former prince, Neagoe Basarab, he changed his name and reigned as Matei Basarab from September 1631.

Matei Basarab whose reign was a period of stability in the 17th-century history of Wallachia

Matei Basarab closely cooperated with the boyars throughout his reign. He regularly convoked their assembly and strengthened the boyars' control of the peasants who worked on their estates. Uppon his initiative, the copper mine at Baia de Aramă and the iron mine at Baia de Fier were reopened, and two paper mills and a glasswork were built. He stopped farming out the revenues from salt mining and custom duties and introduced a new system of taxation. The latter reform increased the tax burden to such an extent that many of the serfs fled from Wallachia. In response, Matei Basarab levied the taxes that the serfs who left the village would have paid upon those who stayed behind. Increasing state revenues enabled him to finance the erection or renovation of 30 churches and monasteries in Wallachia and on Mount Athos. He established the first institution of higher education – a college in Târgoviște – in Wallachia in 1646. He set up an army of mercenaries. Matei Basarab concluded a series of treaties with George I and II Rákóczi between 1635 and 1650, promising to pay a yearly tribute. In exchange, both princes assisted him against Vasile Lupu of Moldavia who made several attempts to expand his authority over Wallachia. Excessive taxation and the prince's failure to satisfy his soldiers' demands for higher salary caused a revolt at the end of his rule. He died on 9 April 1654.

Ten days later, the boyars elected Constantin Șerban – Radu Șerban's illegitimate son – prince. Upon the boyars' demand, the new ruler dismissed many soldiers, causing a new riot in February 1655. The discontented musketeers and local guards – the seimeni and dorobanți – joined the rebellious serfs and attacked boyars' courts. The prince sought the assistance of George II Rákóczi and George Stephen of Moldavia. Their united army routed the rebels on the Teleajen River on 26 June, but smaller groups of the dismissed soldiers continued to fight until their leader, Hrizea of Bogdănei, was killed in 1657. Constantin Șerban acknowledged George II Rákóczi's suzerainty in 1657. After Rákóczi's fall, the Sublime Porte dethroned Constantin Șerban and installed Mihnea III, who was allegedly Radu Mihnea's son, as the new prince in early 1658. However, the latter formed an anti-Ottoman alliance with George II Rákóczi and Constantin Șerban, who had in the meantime seized Moldavia. He defeated the Ottomans at Frătești on 23 November 1659, but a joint invasion of the Ottomans and the Crimean Tatars forced him to flee to Transylvania.

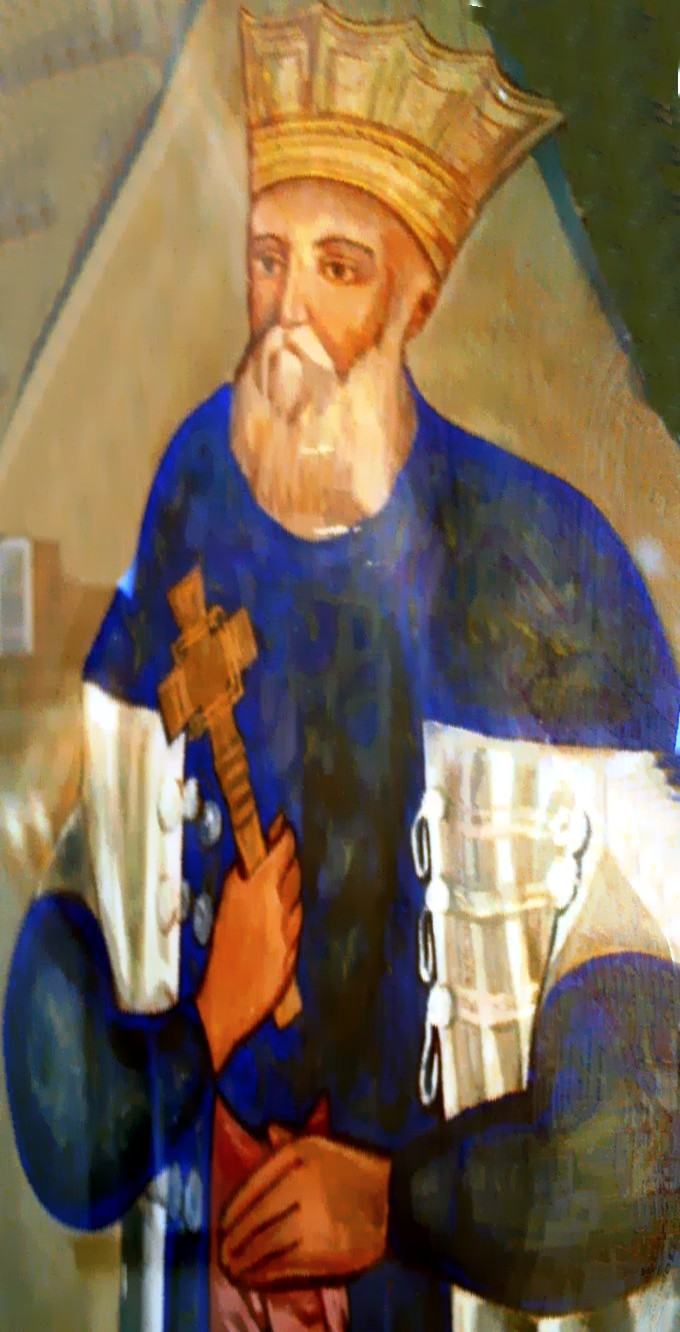
Șerban Cantacuzino who made attempts to transform Wallachia into a hereditary monarchy

The boyars, who were sharply opposed to Mihnea III's anti-Ottoman policy, exerted a powerful influence on state administration after his fall. The boyars formed two parties, which were centered around the Cantacuzino and Băleni families. George Ghica was proclaimed prince in December 1659, but he soon renounced in favor of his son, Gregory. The young prince governed with Constantine Cantacuzino's assistance. Gregory Ghica took part in the Ottoman campaign against Royal Hungary in 1663 and 1664. However, the Ottomans received information of his secret correspondence with the Habsburgs, forcing him to flee for Vienna. The Sublime Porte appointed Radu Leon, who was Leon Tomșa's son, prince. He favored the Greeks, but the boyars forced him to repeat his father's decree against them. He was dethroned in March 1669, and the Catacuzinos' puppet, Anthony of Popeşti, was declared prince. The Sublime Porte reinstalled George Ghica on the throne in 1672. He accompanied the Ottomans against Poland in 1673, but let himself captured by the Poles, which contributed to the Ottomans' defeat in the Battle of Khotyn on 11 November 1673. The Ottomans dethroned Ghica and appointed George Ducas – a Greek from Istanbul – prince. Ghica promoted new boyar families – the Cuparescu from Moldavia and the Leurdeni – to counterbalance the Cantacuzinos' influence. However, the Sublime Porte transferred Ducas to Moldavia and appointed the wealthy Șerban Cantacuzino prince.

The new prince who wanted to restore the monarchs' absolut power captured and executed many members of the Băleni family. He set up a school for higher education and invited Orthodox scholars from the Ottoman Empire to teach philosophy, natural sciences and classical literature. He supported the Ottomans during the siege of Vienna in 1683, but also negotiated with the Christian powers. In fear of the Habsburgs' attempts to promote Catholicism, Cantacuzino tried to forge an alliance with Russia. After imperial troops took control of Transylvania in 1688, Cantacuzino was willing to accept Leopold I's suzerainty in exchange for the Banat and the acknowledgement of his descendants' hereditary rule in Wallachia, but his offers were refused. The negotiations were still in progress when Cantacuzino died unexpectedly in October.

The spread of hans – inns protected by walls – in the 17th century shows the important role of commerce. For instance, according to foreign travelers' accounts, there were seven hans in Bucharest in 1666. Șerban Cantacuzino, who especially promoted commerce, had new roads and bridges built throughout the country. Maize was also introduced in Wallachia upon his initiative. Lofty mansions built for the Cantacuzinos at Măgureni and Filipești in the middle of the century show the boyars' increasing wealth.

=== Moldavia (1606–1687) ===
Ieremia Movilă, who gave his daughters to Polish magnates in marriage, held firm to his alliance with Poland, but never turned against the Ottoman Empire. He achieved that both Poland and the Ottomans acknowledged his family's hereditary right to the throne, but after his death in summer 1606, the boyars tried to hinder his son, Constantine, from seizing the throne. The young prince, whose mother was famed for her political skills, only mounted the throne at the end of 1607. Constantin Movilă strengthened his alliance with Poland, Transylvania and Wallachia, which irritated the Ottomans. The Sublime Porte replaced him with Stephen II Tomșa in September 1611. After Constantin Movilă's unsuccessful attempt to return with Polish support, Stephen Tomșa introduced a policy of terror, executing many boyars. The boyars rose up in open rebellion with Polish assistance and dethroned the prince in favor of Alexander Movilă in November 1615. The Ottomans stepped in, assisting Radu Mihnea, who had pacified Wallachia, to seize the throne in 1616.

Moldavia was included in the Peace of Busza, signed in September 1617, between Poland and the Ottoman Empire, which obliged Poland to cede the fortress of Hotin to Moldavia and to give up supporting Radu Mihnea's opponents. In the same year, peasant uprisings started in many places because of the increased taxation. The Sublime Porte granted Moldavia to Gaspar Graziani, a Venetian adventurer, in 1619. He attempted to forge an anti-Ottoman alliance with Poland and the Habsburgs, but a group of boyars murdered him in August 1620. In the following one and half decades six princes – Alexandru Iliaș, Stephen Tomșa, Radu Mihnea, Miron Barnovschi-Movilă, Alexandru Coconul, and Moise Movilă – succeeded on the throne. Barnovschi-Movilă ordered that runaway serfs be returned to their lords. An uprising of the peasantry forced Alexandru Iliaș to abdicate in 1633, and the mob massacred many of his Greek courtiers.

A period of stability commenced when Vasile Lupu mounted the throne in 1634. He was of Albanian origin and received a Greek education, but he was proclaimed prince after an anti-Greek rebellion. Lupu Vasile regarded himself as the Byzantine emperors' successor and introduced an authoritarian regime. He gained the support of both the pro-Polish and the pro-Ottoman boyars, but also strengthened the Greeks' position through farming out state revenues and supporting their acquisition of landed property. He set up a college in Iași in 1639 and promoted the establishment of the first printing press in Moldavia three years later. He was planning to unite Moldavia and Transylvania under his rule and invaded Matei Basarab's Moldavia four times between 1635 and 1653, but achieved nothing. He attacked the Cossacks and the Crimean Tatars who marched through Moldavia after their campaigns against Poland in 1649. In retaliation, the Cossacks and the Tatars jointly invaded Moldavia in the next year. Hetman Bohdan Khmelnytsky persuaded Vasile Lupu to marry his daughter, Ruxandra, to the Hetman's son, Tymofiy in 1652. Vasile Lupu was overthrown in a military coup that logofăt George Stephen organized against him with Transylvanian and Wallachian assistance in early 1653. Tymofiy Khmelnytsky supported him to return, but their troops were defeated in the Battle of Finta on 27 May.

George Stephen dismissed Vasile Lupu's relatives from the highest offices. He spent enormous sums to pay his mercenaries, but could not hinder the latter from pillaging the countryside or fighting against each other. Although the Sublime Porte forbade him to support George II Rákóczi, he sent a troop of 2,000 to accompany Rákóczi to Poland. In retaliation, the Porte dethroned George Stephen and placed George Ghica on the throne in 1659.

== 17th–18th centuries ==
Although centuries of continued attacks and raids from Turks, Tatars, Poles, Hungarians, and Cossacks, had crippled Moldavia and Wallachia and caused economical and human losses, the two countries were relatively adapted to this type of warfare. During the second half of the 17th century, Poland suffered a similar series of attacks: Swedish, Cossack and Tartar attacks ultimately left Poland in ruin, and it lost its place as a Central European power (see The Deluge).

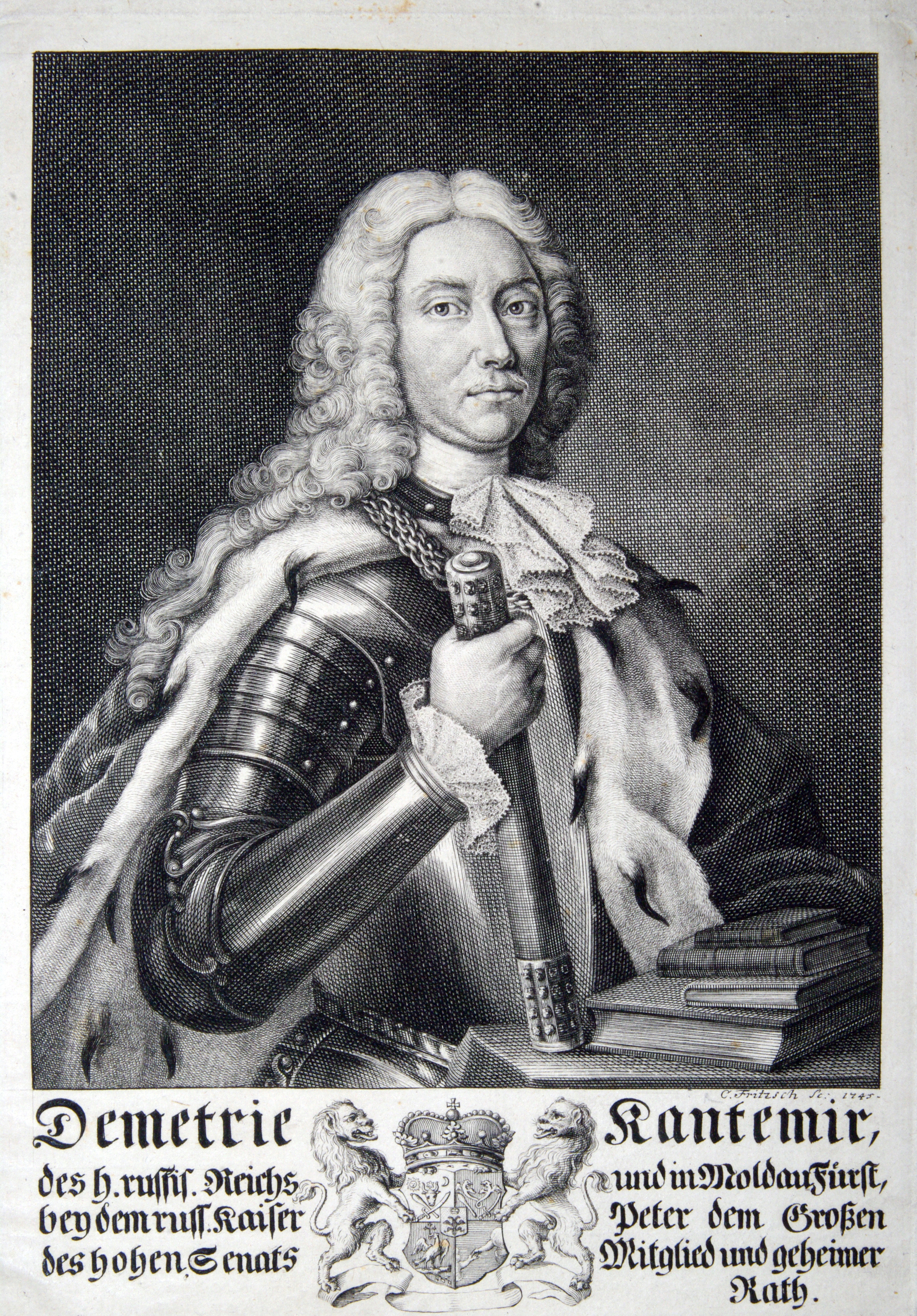
Dimitrie Cantemir (1673–1723)

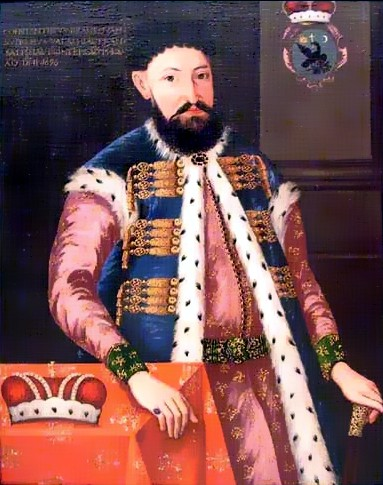
Constantin Brâncoveanu (1654–1714)

Catholic Poland and Hungary, which despite being Christian countries, constantly tried to take control of the Eastern Orthodox Moldavia and Wallachia. A new possible ally was Russia, which apparently posed no danger to Moldavia, for geographic and religious reasons.

During the early 17th century, Moldavia had unfortunate experiences in their efforts for Russian assistance from Ivan III and Alexis Michaelovitch against the Turks and Tatars. Under Peter the Great, Russia's strength and influence had grown, and it seemed to be an excellent ally for Moldavia. Numerous Moldavians and Wallachians enlisted in Peter's army, which contained one squadron made up only of Romanian cavalry. Under Constantin Cantemir, Antioh Cantemir and Constantin Brâncoveanu, Moldavia and Wallachia hoped that with Russian help they might drive out the Turks from the border cities (Chilia, Cetatea Albă).

Charles XII of Sweden, after his defeat in 1709 at the Battle of Lesnaya, sought refuge in Tighina, a border fort of the Turkish vassal state of Moldavia, guarded by Ottoman troops. As a response, Peter came to Iaşi in 1710. There he re-signed the Russian-Moldavian treaty of alliance (previously signed at Lutsk on 24 April 1711), which provided for the hereditary leadership his close friend Dimitrie Cantemir (son of Constantin Cantemir and brother of Antioh Constantin) who was supposed to bear the title of Serene Lord of the land of Moldavia, Sovereign, and Friend (Volegator) of the land of Russia, but not as a subject vassal, as under the Ottomans. Although at that time Russia's western border was the Southern Bug River, the treaty stipulated that the Dniester should be the boundary between Moldavia and the Russian Empire and that the Budjak would belong to Moldavia. The country was to pay not a cent of tribute. The Tsar bound himself not to infringe the rights of the Moldavian sovereign, or whoever might succeed him. Considering him the savior of Moldavia, the boyars held a banquet in honor of the Tsar and to celebrate the treaty.

In response, a great Ottoman army approached along the Prut and, at the Battle of Stanilesti in June 1711, the Russian and Moldavian armies were crushed. The war was ended by the Treaty of the Pruth on July 21, 1711. The Grand Vizier imposed drastic terms. The treaty stipulated that Russian armies would abandon Moldavia immediately, renounce its sovereignty over the Cossacks, destroy the fortresses erected along the frontier, and restore Otchakov to the Porte. Moldavia was obliged to assist at and to support all expenses for the reinforcements and supplies that traversed Moldavian territory. Prince Cantemir, many of his boyars and much of the Moldavian army had to take refuge in Russia.

As a result of their victory of the 1711 war, the Turks placed a garrison in Hotin, rebuilt the fortress under the direction of French engineers, and made the surrounding region into a sanjak. Moldavia was now shut in by Turkish border strips at Hotin, Bender, Akkerman, Kilia, Ismail and Reni. The new sanjak was the most extensive on Moldavian territory, comprising a hundred villages and the market-towns of Lipcani-Briceni and Suliţa Noua. Under the Turks, Bessarabia and Transnistria witnessed a constant immigration from Poland and Ukraine, of Ukrainian speaking landless peasants, largely fugitives from the severe serfdom that prevailed there, to the districts of Hotin and Chişinău.

The existing Moldavians in the Russian armies were joined by newly joined Moldavian and Wallachian Hussars (Hansari in the Romanian language) from the 1735–39 war. When Field Marshal Burkhard Christoph von Münnich entered Iaşi, the capital of Moldavia, Moldavian auxiliary troops on Turkish service changed side and joined the Russians. They were officially constituted into the "Regiment number 96 – Moldavian Hussars" ("Moldavskiy Hussarskiy Polk"), under Prince Cantemir, on October 14, 1741. They took part in the 1741–43 war with Sweden, and the 1741 and 1743 campaigns at Wilmanstrand and Helsinki. During the Seven Years' War they fought at the Battle of Gross-Jägersdorf (1757), Battle of Zorndorf (1758), Battle of Kunersdorf (1759) and the 1760 capturing of Berlin.

=== Phanariots ===
An important demand of the Treaty of Prut was that Moldavia and Wallachia would have only appointed rulers. The Phanariots would be appointed as Hospodars from 1711 to 1821. The late 18th century is regarded as one of the darkest time in Romanian history. The main goal of most Phanariots was to get rich and then to retire.

Under the Phanariots, Moldavia was the first state in Eastern Europe to abolish serfdom, when Constantine Mavrocordatos, summoned the boyars in 1749 to a great council in the church of the Three Hierarchs in Iași. In Transylvania, this reform did not take place until 1784, as a consequence of the bloody revolt of the Romanian peasantry under Horea, Cloşca and Crişan. Bessarabia was now still more attractive to the Polish and Russian serfs. The former had to serve their masters free for 150 days every year, and the latter were virtually slaves. Clandestine immigration from Poland and Ukraine flowed particularly to the boundaries of Bessarabia, around Hotin and Cernăuţi.

=== Russian expansion ===
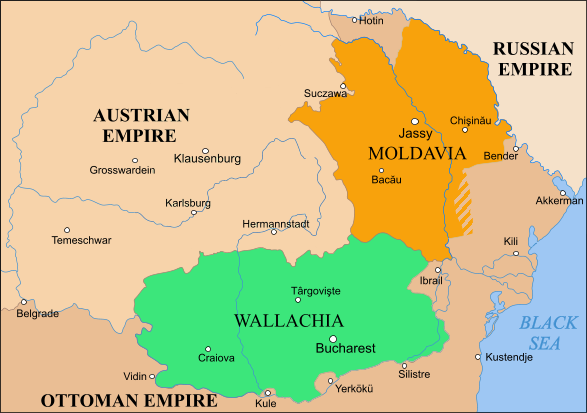
Moldavia prior to the Treaty of Bucharest (1812)

By the late 18th century and early 19th century, Moldavia, Wallachia and Transylvania found themselves as a clashing area for three neighboring empires: the Habsburg Empire, the newly appeared Russian Empire, and the Ottoman Empire.

In 1768, a six-year war broke out between Russia and Turkey (see Russo-Turkish War (1768–74)). The Russians took Hotin, Bender and Iaşi, and occupied Moldavia the whole extent of the war. In 1772, the partition of Poland gave Galicia and Lodomeria to Austria, and Volhynia and Podolia to Russia, so that Moldavia was now in immediate contact with the Austrian and Russian Empires. In the Peace of Kuchuk-Kainarji (1774) Turkey ceded to Russia the country between Dnieper and Bug, but retained the Bessarabian border fortresses and their sanjaks. Moldavia kept its independence, under Turkish suzerainty, as before. Catherine self-assumed the right of protecting the Christians of the Romanian Principalities.

In 1775, Empress Maria Theresa of the Habsburg monarchy took advantage of the situation and occupied the northern extremity of Moldavia, called Bucovina, marching the Austrian armies through Cernăuţi and Suceava, considered the holy city of Moldavia, as it preserved the tombs of Stephen the Great and other Moldavian rulers. The occupation was acknowledged with a treaty between the Habsburg Empire and the Ottoman Empire, despite the protests of Grigore Ghica, the Hospodar of Moldavia. Grigore Ghica was assassinated in 1777, at Iaşi, by Austrian paid Turkish troops.

In 1787, Russia and Austria declared war on Turkey (see Russo-Turkish War (1787–92)). Empress Catherine wished to install Grigori Alexandrovich Potemkin as Prince of Dacia, a Russian vassal state corresponding to the ancient Roman Dacia, and thus to approach her final goal, Constantinople. In 1788 war started, but Turkey's preparations were inadequate and the moment was ill-chosen, now that Russia and Austria were in alliance. After a long list of failures, the Ottomans were forced to surrender. The Peace Treaty was signed at Iaşi (see the Treaty of Jassy) in January 1792. It stipulated that the Moldavia shall remain a Turkish vassal, that Dniester was the frontier between Moldavia and the Russian Empire, and that the Budjak shall pass under Russian control.

In 1806, Napoleon I of France encouraged Czar Alexander Pavlovitch to begin another war with Turkey. Russian troops occupied again Moldavia and Wallachia under General Kutuzov who was made Governor-General of the Romanian Principalities. The foreign consuls and diplomatic agents had to leave the capital cities of Iaşi and Bucharest. After the Russians broke the truce with a surprise attack, the Ottomans entered peace negotiations. At Giurgiu and at Bucharest (see Treaty of Bucharest (1812)), the Russians annexed the Budjak and the eastern part of Moldavia, which was called Bessarabia.

=== Bessarabia and Bukovina ===
Bessarabia, which according to the official Russian census of 1816, 92.5% of the population was Romanian (419,240 Romanians, 30,000 Ukrainians, 19,120 Jews, 6,000 Lipovans), would be held by Russia until 1918. During this time, the percentage of the Romanian population of the area decreased because of the politics of colonization pursued by the Russian government. In the first years following the annexation, several thousand peasant families fled beyond the Pruth out of fear that the Russian authorities would introduce serfdom. This was one of the reasons behind the decision of the Russian government not to extend the regime of serfdom into Bessarbia.

During the first fifteen years after the annexation, Bessarabia enjoyed some measure of autonomy on the basis of "Temporary Rules for the Government of Bessarabia" of 1813 and more fundamentally, "the Statute for the Formation of Bessarabian Province" that was introduced by Alexander I during his personal visit to Chisinau in the spring of 1818. Both documents stipulated that the dispensation of justice is made on the basis of local laws and customs as well as the Russian laws. Romanian was used alongside Russian as the language of administration. The province was placed under the authority of a viceroy who governed together with the Supreme Council formed in part through election from the ranks of the local nobility. A considerable number of positions in the district administration were likewise filled through election. Bessarbia's autonomy was considerably reduced in 1828 when, on the representation of the governor general of New Russia and the viceroy of Bessarabia Prince Mikhail Vorontsov, Nicholas I adopted a new statute which abolished the Supreme Council and reduced the number of elected positions in the local administration.

In parallel, the Russian government pursued the policy of colonization. On 26 June 1812, Tsar Alexander I promulgated the Special Colonization Status of Bessarabia. Bulgarians, Gagauz, Germans, Jews, Swiss and French colonists were brought in. In 1836, the Russian language was imposed as official administration, school and church. Initially an aspect of administrative unification of Bessarabia with the rest of the empire, the promotion of the Russian language in the public sphere became a full-fledged policy of Russification by the end of the 19th century, when the Russian government adopted repressive policies towards local Romanian intellectuals.

Bukovina (including North Bukovina) at that time (1775) had a population of 75,000 Romanians and 12,000 Ukrainians, Jews and Poles. It was annexed to the Habsburg-held province of Galicia, and colonized by Ukrainians, Germans, Hungarians, Jews and Armenians. They were granted free lands and exclusion from paying any taxes. Between 1905 and 1907, 60,000 Romanians were promised more land, and were sent to Siberia and the Central Asian provinces. Instead, further Belarusians and Ukrainians were brought in. The official languages in school and administration were German and Polish.

== Transylvania ==
=== The Habsburgs ===
In 1683 Jan Sobieski's Polish army crushed an Ottoman army besieging Vienna, and Christian forces soon began the slow process of driving the Turks from Europe. In 1688 the Transylvanian Diet renounced Ottoman suzerainty and accepted Austrian protection. Eleven years later, the Porte officially recognized Austria's sovereignty over the region. Although an imperial decree reaffirmed the privileges of Transylvania's nobles and the status of its four "recognized" religions, Vienna assumed direct control of the region and the emperor planned annexation.

The Romanian majority remained segregated from Transylvania's political life and almost totally enserfed; Romanians were forbidden to marry, relocate, or practice a trade without the permission of their landlords. Besides oppressive feudal exactions, the Orthodox Romanians had to pay tithes to the Roman Catholic or Protestant church, depending on their landlords' faith. Barred from collecting tithes, Orthodox priests lived in penury, and many labored as peasants to survive.

Under Habsburg rule, Roman Catholics dominated Transylvania's more numerous Protestants, and Vienna mounted a campaign to convert the region to Catholicism. The imperial army delivered many Protestant churches to Catholic hands, and anyone who broke from the Catholic Church was liable to receive a public flogging. The Habsburgs also attempted to persuade Orthodox clergymen to join the Romanian Greek-Catholic Church, which retained Orthodox rituals and customs but accepted four key points of Catholic doctrine and acknowledged papal authority.

Jesuits dispatched to Transylvania promised Orthodox clergymen heightened social status, exemption from serfdom, and material benefits. In 1699 and 1701, Emperor Leopold I decreed Transylvania's Orthodox Church to be one with the Roman Catholic Church; the Habsburgs, however, never intended to make Greek-Catholicism a "received" religion and did not enforce portions of Leopold's decrees that gave Greek-Catholic clergymen the same rights as Roman Catholic priests. Despite an Orthodox synod's acceptance of union, many Orthodox clergy and faithful rejected it.

In 1711, having suppressed an eight-year rebellion of Hungarian nobles and serfs, the Austrian empire consolidated its hold on Transylvania, and within several decades the Greek-Catholic Church proved a seminal force in the rise of Romanian nationalism. Greek-Catholic clergymen had influence in Vienna; and Greek-Catholic priests schooled in Rome and Vienna acquainted the Romanians with Western ideas, wrote histories tracing their Daco-Roman origins, adapted the Latin alphabet to the Romanian language (see Romanian alphabet), and published Romanian grammars and prayer books. The Romanian Greek-Catholic Church's seat at Blaj, in southern Transylvania, became a center of Romanian culture.

The Romanians' struggle for equality in Transylvania found its first formidable advocate in a Greek-Catholic bishop, Inocenţiu Micu-Klein, who, with imperial backing, became a baron and a member of the Transylvanian Diet. From 1729 to 1744, Klein submitted petitions to Vienna on the Romanians' behalf and stubbornly took the floor of Transylvania's Diet to declare that Romanians were the inferiors of no other Transylvanian people, that they contributed more taxes and soldiers to the state than any of Transylvania's "nations", and that only enmity and outdated privileges caused their political exclusion and economic exploitation. Klein fought to gain Greek-Catholic clergymen the same rights as Roman Catholic priests, reduce feudal obligations, restore expropriated land to Romanian peasants, and bar feudal lords from depriving Romanian children of an education.

The bishop's words fell on deaf ears in Vienna; and Hungarian, German, and Szekler deputies, jealously clinging to their noble privileges, openly mocked the bishop and snarled that the Romanians were to the Transylvanian body politic what "moths are to clothing". Klein eventually fled to Rome where his appeals to the Pope proved fruitless. He died in a Roman monastery in 1768. Klein's struggle, however, stirred both Greek-Catholic and Orthodox Romanians to demand equal standing. In 1762 an imperial decree established an organization for Transylvania's Orthodox community, but the empire still denied Orthodoxy equality even with the Greek-Catholic Church.

=== The Revolt of Horea, Cloşca and Crişan ===
Emperor Joseph II (ruled 1780–90), before his accession, witnessed the serfs' wretched existence during three tours of Transylvania. As emperor he launched an energetic reform program. Steeped in the teachings of the French Enlightenment, he practised "enlightened despotism," or reform from above designed to preempt revolution from below. He brought the empire under strict central control, launched an education program, and instituted religious tolerance, including full civil rights for Orthodox Christians. In 1784, Transylvanian serfs under Horea, Cloşca and Crişan, convinced they had the Emperor's support, rebelled against their feudal masters, sacked castles and manor houses, and murdered about 100 nobles. Joseph ordered the revolt repressed, but granted amnesty to all participants except their leaders, whom the nobles tortured and put to death in front of peasants brought to witness the execution. Joseph, aiming to strike at the rebellion's root causes, emancipated the serfs, annulled Transylvania's constitution, dissolved the Union of Three Nations, and decreed German as the official language of the empire. Hungary's nobles and Catholic clergy resisted Joseph's reforms, and the peasants soon grew dissatisfied with taxes, conscription, and forced requisition of military supplies. Faced with broad discontent, Joseph rescinded many of his initiatives toward the end of his life.

Joseph II's Germanization decree triggered a chain reaction of national movements throughout the empire. Hungarians appealed for unification of Hungary and Transylvania and Magyarization of minority peoples. Threatened by both Germanization and Magyarization, the Romanians and other minority nations experienced a cultural awakening. In 1791 two Romanian bishops—one Orthodox, the other Greek-Catholic—petitioned Emperor Leopold II (ruled 1790–92) to grant Romanians political and civil rights, to place Orthodox and Greek-Catholic clergy on an equal footing, and to apportion a share of government posts for Romanian appointees; the bishops supported their petition by arguing that Romanians were descendants of the Romans and the aboriginal inhabitants of Transylvania. The Emperor restored Transylvania as a territorial entity and ordered the Transylvanian Diet to consider the petition. The Diet, however, decided only to allow Orthodox believers to practise their faith; the deputies denied the Orthodox Church recognition and refused to give Romanians equal political standing alongside the other Transylvanian nations.

Leopold's successor, Francis I (1792–1835), whose almost abnormal aversion to change and fear of revolution brought his empire four decades of political stagnation, virtually ignored Transylvania's constitution and refused to convoke the Transylvanian Diet for twenty-three years. When the Diet finally reconvened in 1834, the language issue reemerged, as Hungarian deputies proposed making Magyar (Hungarian) the official language of Transylvania. In 1843 the Hungarian Diet passed a law making Magyar Hungary's official language, and in 1847 the Transylvanian Diet enacted a law requiring the government to use Magyar. Transylvania's Romanians protested futilely.

At the end of the 17th century, following the defeat of the Turks, Hungary and Transylvania become part of the Habsburg monarchy. The Austrians, in turn, rapidly expanded their empire: in 1718 an important part of Wallachia, called Oltenia, was incorporated into the Austrian Empire as the Banat of Craiova and was only returned in 1739.

== See also ==
- List of Wallachian rulers (up to 1859)
- List of Moldavian rulers (up to 1859)
- List of Transylvanian rulers (up to 1918)

== Bibliography ==
- Andea, Susana (2005). "The Romanian Principalities in the 17th Century". In Pop, Ioan-Aurel; Bolovan, Ioan (eds.). History of Romania: Compendium. Romanian Cultural Institute (Center for Transylvanian Studies). pp. 315–396. ISBN 978-973-7784-12-4.
- Barta, Gábor (1994). "The Emergence of the Principality and its First Crises (1526–1606)". In Köpeczi, Béla; Barta, Gábor; Bóna, István; Makkai, László; Szász, Zoltán; Borus, Judit (eds.). History of Transylvania. Akadémiai Kiadó. pp. 245–300. ISBN 963-05-6703-2.
- Bolovan, Ioan; Constantiniu, Florin; Michelson, Paul E.; Pop, Ioan Aurel; Popa, Cristian; Popa, Marcel; Scurtu, Ioan; Treptow, Kurt W.; Vultur, Marcela; Watts, Larry L. (1997). A History of Romania. The Center for Romanian Studies. ISBN 973-98091-0-3.
- Cartledge, Bryan (2011). The Will to Survive: A History of Hungary. C. Hurst & Co. ISBN 978-1-84904-112-6.
- Crowe, David M. (2007). A History of the Gypsies of Eastern Europe and Russia. Palgarve. ISBN 978-1-4039-8009-0.
- Davies, Norman (1982). God's Playground: A History of Poland, Volume I: The Origins to 1795. Columbia University Press. ISBN 0-231-05351-7.
- Dörner, Anton (2009). "Power Structure". In Pop, Ioan-Aurel; Nägler, Thomas; Magyari, András (eds.). The History of Transylvania, Vol. II (From 1541 to 1711). Romanian Academy (Center for Transylvanian Studies). pp. 134–178. ISBN 978-973-7784-43-8.
- Dungaciu, Dan; Manolache, Viorella (2019). 100 Years since the Great Union of Romania. Cambridge Scholars Publishing. ISBN 978-15-27-54297-6.
- Fine, John V. A (1994). The Late Medieval Balkans: A Critical Survey from the Late Twelfth Century to the Ottoman Conquest. The University of Michigan Press. ISBN 0-472-08260-4.
- Georgescu, Vlad (1991). The Romanians: A History. Ohio State University Press. ISBN 0-8142-0511-9.
- Hitchins, Keith (2014). A Concise History of Romania. Cambridge University Press. ISBN 978-0-521-87238-6.
- Kontler, László (1999). Millennium in Central Europe: A History of Hungary. Atlantisz Publishing House. ISBN 963-9165-37-9.
- Makkai, László (1994). "The Emergence of the Estates (1172–1526)". In Köpeczi, Béla; Barta, Gábor; Bóna, István; Makkai, László; Szász, Zoltán; Borus, Judit (eds.). History of Transylvania. Akadémiai Kiadó. pp. 178–243. ISBN 963-05-6703-2.
- Péter, Katalin (1994). "The Golden Age of the Principality (1606–1660)". In Köpeczi, Béla; Barta, Gábor; Bóna, István; Makkai, László; Szász, Zoltán; Borus, Judit (eds.). History of Transylvania. Akadémiai Kiadó. pp. 245–300. ISBN 963-05-6703-2.
- Pop, Ioan-Aurel (1999). Romanians and Romania: A Brief History. Boulder. ISBN 0-88033-440-1.
- Pop, Ioan-Aurel (2013). "De manibus Valachorum scismaticorum...": Romanians and Power in the Mediaeval Kingdom of Hungary: The Thirteenth and Fourteenth Centuries. Peter Lang Edition. ISBN 978-3-631-64866-7.
- Prodan, D. (1971). Supplex Libellus Valachorum or The Political Struggle of the Romamnians in Transylvania during the 18th Century. Publishing House of the Academy of the Socialist Republic of Romania.
- R. Várkonyi, Ágnes (1994). "The End of Turkish Rule in Transylvania and the Reunification of Hungary (1660–1711)". In Köpeczi, Béla; Barta, Gábor; Bóna, István; Makkai, László; Szász, Zoltán; Borus, Judit (eds.). History of Transylvania. Akadémiai Kiadó. pp. 359–411. ISBN 963-05-6703-2.
- Rüsz Fogarasi, Enikő (2009). "Habitat, nutrition, crafts". In Pop, Ioan-Aurel; Nägler, Thomas; Magyari, András (eds.). The History of Transylvania. Vol. II (From 1541 to 1711). Romanian Academy (Center for Transylvanian Studies). pp. 181–197. ISBN 978-973-7784-43-8.
- Stavrianos, L. S. (2000). The Balkans since 1453. Hurst & Company. ISBN 978-1-85065-551-0.
- Szegedi, Edit (2009). "The Birth and Evolution of the Principality of Transylvania (1541–1690)". In Pop, Ioan-Aurel; Nägler, Thomas; Magyari, András (eds.). The History of Transylvania. Vol. II (From 1541 to 1711). Romanian Academy (Center for Transylvanian Studies). pp. 99–111. ISBN 978-973-7784-43-8.
- Treptow, Kurt W.; Popa, Marcel (1996). Historical Dictionary of Romania. Scarecrow Press, Inc. ISBN 0-8108-3179-1.
- Charles Upson Clark: Bessarabia: Russia and Roumania on the Black Sea ;
- Stanislaw Schwann: Marx-Engels Archives, International Institute of Social History, Amsterdam, the Netherlands;
- Karl Marx – Însemnări despre români, Ed. Academiei RPR, București, 1964
- Pop, Ioan Aurel, Istoria Transilvaniei medievale: de la etnogeneza românilor până la Mihai Viteazul ("Histori of medieval Transylvania, from the ethno-genesis the Romanians until Mihai Viteazul"), Cluj-Napoca.
- Iorga Nicolae: "Byzance après Byzance. Continuation de l'"Histoire de la vie Byzantine"", Institut d'Etudes Byzantines, Bucharest 1935;
- Chris Hellier "Monasteries of Greece"; Tauris Editions, London 1995;
