= Alexandru Coconul =

Prince of Wallachia (1611-1632)

Prince of Wallachia
- Reign: 14 August 1623 – 5 October 1627
- Predecessor: Radu Mihnea
- Successor: Alexandru Iliaș

Prince of Moldavia
- Reign: June 1629 – 29 April 1630
- Predecessor: Miron Barnovschi-Movilă
- Successor: Moise Movilă
- Born: 1611
- Died: June or October 1632 (aged 21); Istanbul
- Spouse: Ruxandra Beglitzi
- Dynasty: Drăculești; Hunyadi (claimed)
- Father: Radu Mihnea
- Mother: Arghira Minetti
- Religion: Orthodox (presumed crypto-Catholic)

Alexandru Radu (Church Slavonic and Romanian Cyrillic: Алєѯандрꙋ воєвод, Alexandru Voevod; Italian: Alessandro Radoulo or Alessandro sesto, "Alexander the Sixth"; 1611 – June or October 1632), better known as Alexandru Coconul ("Alexander the Child" or "the Princelet") or Alexandru Corvin, was the Prince of Wallachia from 1623 to 1627, and then the Prince of Moldavia from 1629 to 1630. He was the son of Radu Mihnea, who reigned several times in both countries the 1600s and 1610s; this connection also made Alexandru among the last of Vlad the Impaler's Romanian bloodline within the House of Drăculești. The dynasty's apex coincided with the tightening of control by the Ottoman Empire over both principalities, leading to their direct appointment or demotion by the Ottoman Sultan, in exchange for gifts and promises to pay up in taxes (including the haraç). Radu Mihnea contemplated ways to decrease the Ottoman-imposed burdens, and had a cautious foreign policy, aligning himself with the Republic of Venice; he was part-Venetian himself, while Alexandru's mother was Italo-Levantine. The family also favored Catholicism, possibly to the point of secretly embracing it—while continuing to act as nominal protectors of the Eastern Orthodox Church.

Alexandru's Wallachian reign was instrumented as a dynastic union, since his father was at the time serving as Moldavia's prince; the fourteen-year-old made Bucharest his permanent capital, and continued works at Radu Vodă Monastery. Both countries were at the time partly occupied by the Crimean Khanate, whose troops, which produced a major economic slump, were only chased out by the neighboring Principality of Transylvania. As a result, both Radu Mihnea and Alexandru were controlled by Gabriel Bethlen, the Transylvanian Prince, who wished to eventually annex Moldavia and Wallachia to his own polity. Alexandru obtained more political leverage by marrying Ruxandra Beglitzi, from an influential clan of Ottoman Greeks, but immediately shunned her upon discovering that she had been disfigured by smallpox. Coconul was orphaned and politically isolated by 1626, when Miron Barnovschi-Movilă, who took over in Moldavia, came to act as his superior.

Targeted by intrigues and uprisings, Coconul tried to reduce government waste, and oversaw the first trial for embezzlement in Wallachia's history; he also tried lessening the fiscal weight on his subjects. His failure to pay up his Ottoman debts ended up vexing his liege, Murad IV, who had him deposed and exiled. When his protectors intervened on his behalf, Alexandru was allowed to replace Barnovschi in Moldavia. His seven-months-long reign there was sabotaged by the Movilești family, as well as by Coconul's subservience to his Greek-and-Venetian allies. Perceived as a liability, he was replaced by Murad with the more experienced Moise Movilă; this did not stop Alexandru from still pursuing the throne of either principality, and he presented himself as a candidate to the day of his death, aged 21. His relatives engaged in a protracted legal battle over money he had stored at the Zecca of Venice. He himself faded out of public memory, and by the 19th century was casually mistaken for his lifelong rival, Alexandru Iliaș.

== Biography ==
=== Origins and early life ===
Coconul was active at a time when the twin principalities of Wallachia and Moldavia were experiencing direct submission to the Ottoman Empire, with their rulers (also known collectively as voivodes or hospodars) directly appointed by the Sublime Porte from various qualified families. Alexandru's father Radu Mihnea was the illegitimate son of Prince Mihnea Turcitul. The latter had reigned twice in Wallachia before 1591, afterwards embracing Islam. Turcitul and his progeny formed a separate branch of the Drăculești clan, which had divided itself into competing factions; all three figures were occasionally known as the Mihnești, which honored their 15th-century ancestor, Mihnea cel Rău, who was himself born out of wedlock to Vlad the Impaler. When addressing Catholic foreigners, Turcitul and his descendants occasionally styled themselves as "Corvin"—stating a claim of descent from the Hunyadi family, and thus favoring a (since debunked) theory that all of the Impaler's descendants were blood relatives of John "Corvinus".

The princelet was most likely born in 1611, when Radu Mihnea was on his second stint as a Wallachian ruler. Historian Nicolae Iorga believes that he was named after his great-grandfather Alexander II Mircea, while his sister, Ecaterina, was a namesake of her great-grandmother, Catherine Salvaresso. Through Salvaresso, the two children were already descendants of Venetian nobility, an Italian connection that was reinforced by their father's marriage. Coconul and Ecaterina's mother was Lady Arghira, whom genealogist Constantin Gane tentatively identified as a Greek. Other scholars, who have recovered her original surname, "Minetti", describe her as an Italo-Levantine with Venetian roots. The more detailed documents on her life report that she was residing at Pera and was financially destitute before marrying Radu, who was at the time in his Ottoman exile.

Radu Mihnea's legitimate children were the recipients of at least some Western education: Ecaterina could at least sign her name, while Alexandru could write in Venetian (though, as Iorga notes, his style was ungrammatical). Venetian sources nevertheless suggest that he could not speak the language, and had to use gestures to make himself understood. They had a half-brother, born from Radu Mihnea's affair with a slave-girl, and thus half-Romani. He is identified by Iorga as Mihnea Radu, himself a future Prince of Wallachia. This view is challenged by another historian, Andrei Pippidi, since the obscure second son was only known in records as "Nicolachi", and could not have had the same age as Mihnea Radu. Another scholar, Constantin Rezachevici, argues that Radu Mihnea had yet another legitimate daughter, whose name is unknown, and who was married to Constantine Vevelli in 1630. A second or third "youngest daughter" is described by Gane, though Rezachevici identifies her with Ecaterina.

The family was ambiguous in its religious expression. They did not follow Turcitul's religious beliefs, which would have disqualified them from ruling in either Moldavia and Wallachia, though they allowed Turcitul's Muslim daughters to settle in Bucharest and pray there in an improvised mosque. Radu Mihnea was pledged as a protector of the Eastern Orthodox Church (he had been educated on Mount Athos), but were also interested in forming close ties with Catholic powers. Overall, his religious policies were informed by Cyril Lucaris and, to a lesser degree, by Maximos Margunios—in that they came close to advocating full communion with the Roman Church. As eyewitness Giovanni Battista Montalbani reports, he passed himself off as a "good Catholic". This statement was backed by a Franciscan missionary, Paolo Bonici, who was also a privy secretary of "Radulio Corvino". According to Bonici, Radu was a crypto-Catolic, to the point of receiving the last rites as a member of the Roman Church. The monarch was also good friends with Philippe de Harlay, the French ambassador to the Ottoman court, who believed that Radu supported his agenda for consolidating Catholicism in Eastern Europe. Arghira's brother, Bartolommeo Minetti, served as a liaison between Radu and de Harlay; he was also Stolnic of Wallachia in 1620–1627.

When Alexandru was still an "infinitely small child", his father was ordered by the Grand Vizier, Öküz Mehmed Pasha, to leave Wallachia and take the Moldavian throne for his first of two reigns in that country; Alexandru therefore spent part of his childhood in Iași, the Moldavian capital. This interval was ended by a revolt of the Moldavian boyardom against their new lord's all-Greek retinue. Though the uprising was quashed, it alerted the Ottomans as to Radu Mihnea's weaknesses. Consequently, Arghira and her children were dispatched as hostages to Istanbul. The boy was seen by his father as useful for his own political project, namely a dynastic union between Wallachia and Moldavia—an idea that "seems to have taken hold in Radu Mihnea's mind as early as 1616, when he took the reins of Moldavia for the first time, after having twice held the Wallachian throne." An avviso appearing at Istanbul during that month narrates that Radu had wanted his son to succeed him in Wallachia, but that this project had been shelved due to Alexandru's "very young age" (he would have been "five or six years old"). Battling gout or rheumatism and an eye disease, Radu Mihnea resigned in 1619, and joined the other Mihnești in Istanbul. He was cured by his doctors, allowing him to seek the Wallachian throne; he was eventually granted this favor, and returned with Arghira and Alexandru to his twin capitals, Bucharest and Târgoviște, in 1620.

=== Wallachian coronation and marriage ===
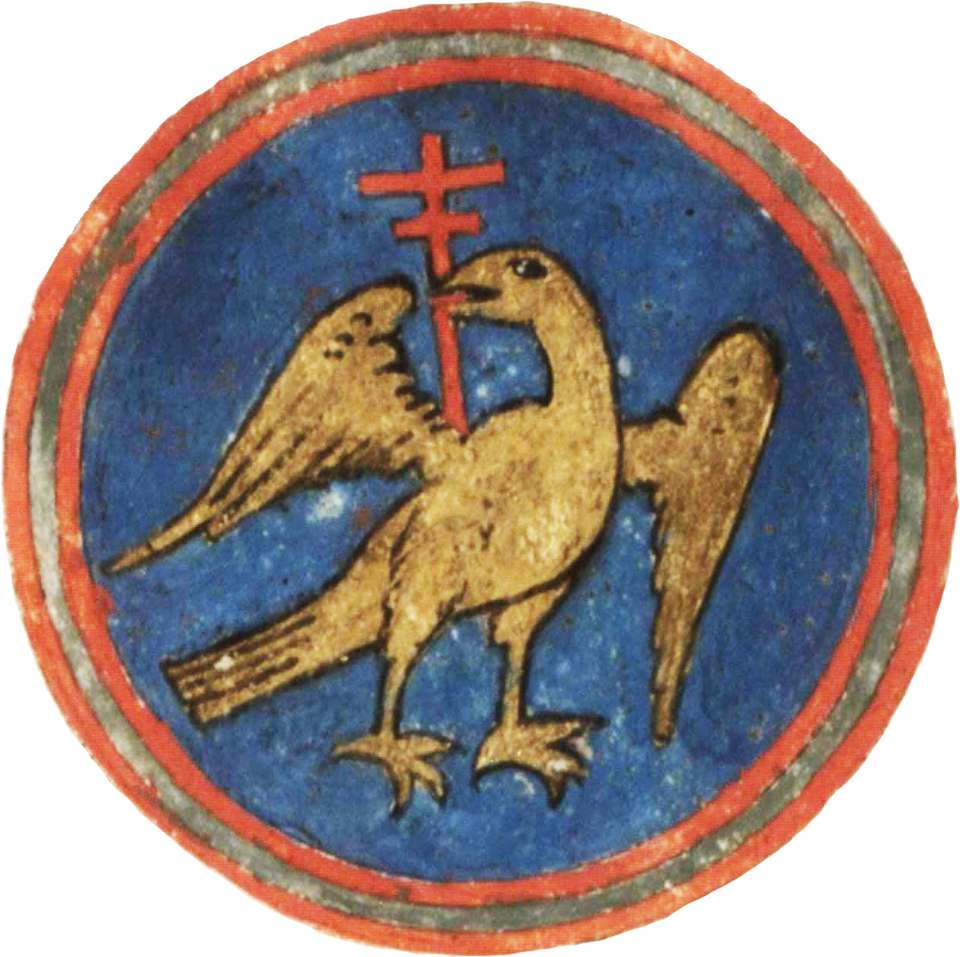
Emblem of Wallachia as depicted on one of Coconul's writs, 1624

Alexandru was formally assigned the Wallachian throne on 14/24 August 1623. When he began his reign in September, he effectively sealed a dynastic union of the two principalities. Specifically, Radu Mihnea asked and obtained that he himself be moved to Iași, while his son remained in Bucharest with Arghira as regent; in this arrangement, Gane sees evidence that Wallachia was in reality governed from Iași. According to cultural historian Răzvan Theodorescu, the quasi-unification, one of several such projects effected at various intervals by Drăculești princes, was a "testament to the surpassing of medievalness" by political strategists in both countries. His coronation was regarded as a personal triumph by his father, who, according to notes kept by Krzysztof Zbaraski, personally attended the ceremony—and thus delayed his own coronation at Iași. The two courts remained in near-permanent contact, exchanging officials: in 1625, Alexandru's scribe Udriște Năsturel was dispatched to Hârlău, in what may have been an effort to create a Latin school for the local boyardom. At that stage of his reign, Radu Mihnea was probably hoping that the Ottoman Empire would eventually crumble through the efforts of Catholic powers; while his son was just taking the Wallachian throne, he himself was sending money for safekeeping in the Republic of Venice, and, according to Bonici, was preparing his own self-exile in the Papal States.

Coconul's Wallachian reign had its artistic achievements centered on Bucharest, where he ordered Greek painters to complete work at the monumental Radu Vodă Monastery, which had been erected by his father. In 1625, he awarded its Orthodox monks a portion of his own princely estate, comprising several mills along the Dâmbovița. In early 1626, he donated Saint Nicolas Church (located somewhere in Bucharest) as a metochion of Radu Vodă. He was the first monarch to be entirely focused on Bucharest. Also in 1625, he made it a permanent capital, citing it as a favorite city of his ancestors; Târgoviște was abandoned by the court, and experienced an economic slump as a result. His own character was regarded by his contemporaries as failing: Moldavian chronicler Miron Costin dismisses Alexandru as a "weakling in both body and spirit". This verdict is shared by other contemporaries, with an avviso from the Dutch Republic (May 1630) declaring him as "unfit to rule". The entirety of Coconul's term was marked by his conflicts with the courtiers, including the powerful Vistier Necula Catargiu—who supported the rival pretender, Alexandru Iliaș, to the point of instigating a peasant revolt against the Mihnești. Whether or not related to Catargiu's intrigues, other groups also rebelled against Coconul. One uprising was registered by the rural cavalry units in Mănești-Prahova, but it was quashed by the loyalist boyars and the bulk of the Wallachian military forces; in another incident, Oltenian "thieves" proclaimed an obscure figure, known as Paisie, as the legitimate ruler, only to be hunted down and decimated by local troops.

As a Wallachian ruler, Alexandru adhered to his father's policies in respect to the Tsardom of Russia, which had recently secured access to the Black Sea through its Cossack intermediaries. In December 1624, he recommended Radu Mihnea's apparent ally, Sergius, the Orthodox Metropolitan of Grevena, for a mission to Moscow; in his safe conduct, Sergius is referred to as Coconul's guest, having been shielded in Wallachia from his Ottoman persecutors. Earlier in 1624, both Moldavia and Wallachia had been raided and partly occupied by another Black Sea power, the Crimean Khanate, which was by then allied with the Cossacks against the Ottoman Empire. The invaders only left after a long series of negotiations in autumn of that year, but Wallachia was immediately after raided again, this time by forces from the Principality of Transylvania. The Transylvanian Prince, Gabriel Bethlen, had declared his support for Coconul; the expedition was led by Péter Béldi, who had a mandate to hunt down Catargiu and put an end to any mutinies that the latter was still instigating. As attested by one of Bethlen's letters, Radu Mihnea had asked him to intervene, on behalf of Coconul and Lady Minetti, both of whom were still in Wallachia. The Transylvanians took precautions to transport them safely at a camp outside Rucăr; Bethlen ordered them not to bring the two royals into Transylvania, since that would have permitted the boyars to elect themselves another prince. Though Béldi ended up capturing the Vistier, his life was spared—probably because killing him would have enraged his allies at the Ottoman court; Catargiu was instead exiled to Istanbul, by way of Moldavia.

In September 1625, Alexandru, probably urged on by his father, married Ruxandra Beglitzi. Known in some Romanian sources as Smaranda, she was daughter to Scarlatos, or Scărlet saigiu, a highly influential Greek tax farmer, who attended the wedding. Celebrations took place in the Moldavian village of Movileni on the Siret, just across from the border with Wallachia. As Costin recounts in his chronicle, "the two countries were gathered together", with all boyars attending as guests for partying that lasted for two weeks. However, unbeknown to Alexandru and his father, Ruxandra had been disfigured by smallpox, also developing corneal opacity. She was veiled throughout the wedding, informing Alexandru that such was the custom in her family. When her affliction was discovered, her husband had fits of uncontrollable rage: though tradition holds that Ruxandra was immediately dispatched to her father, it is more likely that Radu Mihnea forced his son not to divorce her; instead, Coconul publicly humiliated her until Scarlatos sent his men to take her back to Istanbul.

=== Orphaned outcast ===
The Mihnești were indebted to the Beglitzi family and their various associates, for which reason Scarlatos' other son-in-law, Costandin Celebiul Asanis, always held parasitical offices at Coconul's court. This situation was complicated by Radu Mihnea's failing health. His debilitating diseases having returned, he died on his Moldavian throne on 13/23 January 1626. He probably appointed a boyar, Miron Barnovschi-Movilă, as his immediate successor. Coconul received his father's remains in Bucharest, and had them buried at Radu Vodă, also commissioning an ornate tombstone. By May, he had also lost Lady Arghira, complining about his loneliness in a letter to de Harlay. Barnovschi was by then set to marry one of the Mihnești girls, and was thus perceived as Coconul's brother-in-law. There is disagreement as to which princess this was—either Ecaterina or her unnamed sister. Ecaterina is known to have been disgraced by a scandal: in what may have been Moldavia's first documented romantic entanglement, she had tried to elope with a house servant, whom Radu Mihnea had to capture and put to death. It remains unclear whether the royal wedding ever took place, since, according to a 1629 letter by de Harlay, Barnovschi had actually wed a Polish lady from Kamieniec.

Scholar Ștefan Andreescu suggests that Barnovschi did not initially break with the Mihnești policies, and that he may have recognized the orphaned Wallachian ruler as a subordinate ally. In contrast, Bethlen was now actively opposed to Coconul, since he supported another member of the Movilești family, Gabriel, for the Wallachian throne. Alexandru was also beset by financial troubles, with one of his writs containing a unique statement about his taking pity on the Khanate-raided villages, from which he felt he could no longer collect taxes such as the haraç. In April 1626, both he and Barnovschi paid ransom to Mehmed III Giray, in exchange for a Crimean pledge not to raid either country. Coconul tried to solve the deepening crisis by eliminating fiscal privileges for newly settled villages (slobozii), and also by convening the estates of the realm; as a result, he obtained a budget of 1 million akçeler, which he then spent on efforts to preserve the princely office. He was faced with an exodus of taxpayers, and, in May 1627, wrote off the debts owed by the Aromanian and Serb colonists, provided they returned to their assigned homes in Marotin. Also then, he wrote to the monks at Radu Vodă, expressing thanks for the sacrifices they and the country at large had endured.

Coconul's main rival was by then Alexandru Iliaș—secretly assisted by Coconul's former father-in-law, who had grown resentful of the Mihnești, he also obtained sizable boyar support. In December 1626, the Transylvanian resident in Budin Eyalet, Tamás Borsos, wrote about the "insane [and] treasonous Wallachian nation", whose representatives were trying to convince Bethlen that he should give recognition to Iliaș. Meanwhile, Coconul's delays in paying up the haraç angered the Ottoman Sultan, Murad IV: in July 1627, the latter ordered his vassal to send all the money he still owed, including sums borrowed from the Ottoman treasury, to Murad's Crimean representatives at Vozia; Coconul showed up at that place, but could not provide the money, and instead helped to fortify Vozia as a service to his liege. In September, Murad was more lenient, issuing a firman by which Moldavia's boyars were required to pay back all the sums they had "squandered" from Coconul's inheritance, and confirming that he still trusted the boy-prince.

Catargiu, mentioned by Borsos as an instigator, was returned to Bucharest in October 1627, and subjected to the first-ever documented trial for embezzlement in Romanian history. The Porte ultimately intervened against Coconul: on 5/15 October, he was unceremoniously deposed by Murad, and exited the country three days later. Observing from the side, the Venetian Bailo, Sebastiano Venier, nominated Scarlatos as the main intriguer, suggesting that he had obtained and then betrayed Coconul's confidence. The usurper, Iliaș, was nominally placed on the throne immediately, but in practice only began his reign on 28 January/7 February 1628. Bethlen, who regarded Iliaș as a personal enemy, tried to fight this change. He did not support either Gabriel or Coconul, but rather asked the Ottomans to unify Transylvania, Moldavia and Wallachia into a single vassal "kingdom", with Bethlen himself as its ruler.

=== Moldavian reign and final years ===
In July 1629, partly acting on Bethlen's intrigues against Barnovschi, the Porte dismissed the latter and sent Coconul to occupy the Moldavian throne. Alexandru owed this appointment to Curt Celebi (son of Celibiul Asanis), who bribed Murad and the Grand Vizier, Hüsrev Pasha, with gifts amounting to 14,000 écus or 100,000 ducats. Alexandru himself had contracted large debts with various Italian bankers, and had assured Bailo Venier that he intended to follow the republic's guidance while on the throne. He also benefited from Barnovschi's political mistakes, since the latter had come to be perceived by the Ottomans as a secret ally of the Polish–Lithuanian Commonwealth. His arrival was welcomed by some of his subjects, with the Orthodox monks of Putna writing to those of Bistrița of their hopes that Alexandru would bring with him "some peace for this land." The prince was however open toward Catholic proselytism, and was initially set to ride into Moldavia alongside Guglielmo Foca, the apostolic prefect; Foca's mission was vetoed by the Bailo, adding to the many conflicts which plagued and weakened the Moldavian Catholic communities.

As part of his justifications, Coconul began spreading rumors that Radu Mihnea had died from being poisoned by Barnovschi. The latter did not immediately relinquish power, and instead took control of Khotin Fortress, with some help from the Crimeans and from the Polish squadron in Kamieniec. His refusal was dealt with by the Ottoman Army: in August, troops were dispatched to ensure that Coconul could safely reach Iași. The Barnovschi threat was neutralized by October, when the Crimeans agreed to leave Moldavia. On his first mission, Coconul was dispatched with the Moldavian military forces to Vozia, strengthening the defense of Yedisan against Cossack raids. He himself dated his enthronement to 22 September/2 October, in a letter that he wrote just days after, wherein he praised Bethlen and informed him on the Moldavian affairs He boasted his having successfully thwarted a Cossack intrusion and having isolated Barnovschi at Khotin. The latter allegedly informed Moldavians that he did not intend to fight "his Lord's son", and that he intended to leave Moldavia once the Khanate will have withdrawn its troops into Poland. In tandem, Barnovschi was also in talks with Tomasz Zamoyski, the Polish Vice-Chancellor, hoping to obtain his support for a mercenary incursion in Moldavia.

In November, Coconul heard of Bethlen's sudden death. With the prospect of Transylvania being dragged back into the Thirty Years' War that was ravaging Central Europe, Murad ordered all his regional vassals, including Coconul, to assist the Transylvanians at a moment's notice; effectively, Coconul was thus subordinated to the Transylvanian Princess, Catherine of Brandenburg. The Mihnești ascendancy signaled another defeat for Catargiu, who was forced out of his Moldavian office; instead, Alexandru promoted a local ally, Vasile Lupu, even though Lupu had been an enemy of Radu Mihnea's. His Boyars' Divan was staffed by foreigners by early 1630. Curt Celebi, who was Alexandru's permanent envoy to the Porte, or Kehaya, uniquely appeared as the presiding officeholder. He seems to have been supplanted as Kehaya by an obscure Ahmet, who was the only Muslim to hold that office, and who may have been one of Coconul's relatives from the Turcitul branch. Lesser offices went to Greeks and other foreigners, possibly including Ragusans; Minetti was left out of the Divan, but apparently continued to assist from abroad.

In line with his deceased father's policies, Alexandru collected funds that Radu Mihnea had stored away in the Zecca of Venice, and which he hoped to use in outmaneuvering rival contenders for his throne; his deposit, possibly arranged for by his distant relative Polo Minio, had 20,000 sequins by 1629. In exchange for such financial services, Venier expected him to provide Moldavian soldiers for the Venetian army. As noted by Pippidi, both Radu and Alexandru were "prudent" in their Venetian policy, hoping to obtain backing from the republic and from other Western powers, but not to the point of joining an anti-Ottoman coalition. There was also some continuity in their treatment of Catholic missionaries, grouped around the Propaganda Fide. Coconul was thus approached by Andrea Bogoslavich, who had carried out missionary work in Moldavia under Radu Mihnea; their rapprochement was curbed from within the Catholic Church itself, since the Latin Patriarchate of Constantinople had demoted Bogoslavich and had labeled him a political suspect.

Coconul's government was meanwhile sabotaged from within by a strong party of Movilești loyalists, who were now backing Moise Movilă as their candidate. They also enjoyed crucial support from the King of Poland, Sigismund Vasa and the Kapudan Pasha (Cataldjali Hasan), who viewed Coconul as responsible for Moldavia's tangible destruction. The isolated young man was now widely perceived as incompetent, which eroded his relations with the Ottoman overlord; summarizing accounts by his older peers, Costin noted that Murad could no longer afford to leave an "outer territory" (țară de margine) to be managed by a "sickly boy" (boleac). Another Transylvanian envoy, Mihály Tholdalagi, was perplexed to note that Coconul "just sits there on his throne, like he's made of iron, while others, some Greek and some Romanian, are ravaging his country". On 28 or 29 April (8 or 9 May) 1630, Coconul was deposed by his overlord. The throne went to Moise, who had generously bribed the Ottoman court in exchange for this advancement. Exiled to Istanbul, which he reached on 30 June, Alexandru still had hopes to return on the throne of Moldavia, and tried to so throughout 1631. As part of this campaign, he offered to provide the Bailo "with any sort of services." According to Gane's reading, by then his sister Ecaterina was married off to his rival Moise Movilă, who made her princess-regnant in 1633 (on his own second reign in Moldavia). Coconul himself died in Istanbul at the age of twenty-one. His death is dated either to early July or (mid-)October 1632.

== Legacy ==
For a while in the 1630s, Celebi tried to obtain political and financial support for Coconul's two surviving siblings—the supposed half-brother, Mihnea Radu, eventually sat on the Wallachian throne in 1658–1659. The latter's claim to legitimacy is discounted by various historians, who suggest that Coconul was the last regnant member of the Drăculești. Both heirs, alongside Bartolommeo Minetti and the various Italian creditors, faced each other in a legal battle over Alexandru's remaining assets; the trial was held in Ottoman courts, and, as Gane notes, only ended up enriching the presiding qadis. Some of the princelet's relatives were able to recover parts of the Zecca deposit, despite opposition from Minio. According to Gane, Coconul's other sister, who was widowed by Barnovschi's execution in 1633, spent her later life at a Movilești estate in Poland; this is contradicted by later scholarship, which sees Barnovschi's wife as unrelated to the Mihnești.

In parallel to the inheritance dispute, Curt Celebi continued to involve himself in intrigues as the nominal Kehaya, favoring various pretenders in both principalities. He was chased out of Wallachia in 1634, when Matei Basarab inaugurated his anti-Greek regime; Celebi enraged Lupu, who had taken the throne in Iași, and who obtained his killing by the Ottomans and then the exile of his entire family. Lady Ruxandra, still regarded as Coconul's widow, went on to marry into the Mavrokordatos family; her new husband, Nikolaos, was an impoverished silk merchant, whom she fell in love with after Alexandru's death. Her transfer of wealth of influence contributed to the Mavrokordatos ascendancy at the Porte, as well as in both principalities—though she herself was disgraced after a clampdown that followed the losing battle of Vienna, and died, after a brief imprisonment, in 1648.

In addition to his serving his father as a proxy, and lasting allegations about his own relative incompetence, Coconul was remembered for his connection to several enduring landmarks and art projects. The works he commissioned at Radu Vodă Monastery included paintings of the Mihnești clan, which are mentioned in a 1650s travel account by Paul of Aleppo. These may have included his own portrait, now lost; the current church murals were done c. 1979 by Sofian Boghiu and Vasile Caraman. The "tall mound" erected on the site of his 1625 wedding was still visible in the 1640s, when the Polish diplomat Wojciech Miaskowski was crossing the Siret valley. In 1631, Apostol Tzigara dedicated Alexandru a manuscript of Pseudo-Dorotheos; this act recognized Coconul as a great-grandson of Peter the Lame, at whose court the Tzigaras had served. The late-17th-century Wallachian chronicle, Letopisețul Cantacuzinesc, preserves a positive image of him, since, due to his "being very young", he relied on "very faithful boyars" and, as such, enforced the laws rather than ruling as a despot. Alexandru had been largely forgotten by the 18th century, when scholar Dimitrie Cantemir mistakenly argued that Ruxandra's first husband had been Matei Basarab—his false deduction was replicated in works by Jean-Louis Carra and Gheorghe Șincai. In the 19th century, following scholarly research into early modern Romania, some historians were thrown off by the similarity of names between Coconul and Iliaș, reading the two Alexandrus, who were real-life enemies, as one and the same figure. As Gane notes, this "bewildering confusion" was created by Alexandru D. Xenopol, and perpetuated by some other period researchers.

== Notes ==
Alexandru Coconul House of Drăculești Cadet branch of the House of Basarab
Preceded by Radu Mihnea	Prince/Voivode of Wallachia; 1623–1627	Succeeded by Alexandru Iliaș
Preceded by Miron Barnovschi-Movilă	Prince/Voivode of Moldavia; 1629–1630	Succeeded by Moise Movilă
