= Alexandra Mavrokordatou =

Greek intellectual & salonist (1605–1684)

Alexandra Mavrokordatou (Greek: Αλεξάνδρα Μαυροκορδάτου; 1605–1684), also called Loxandra or Roxandra (Λωξάνδρα/Ρωξάνδρα), was a Greek intellectual and salonist who lived in the Ottoman Empire. She was also known as Loxandra Scarlatou.

Alexandra was the daughter of Scarlatos Beglitzi, a merchant who had grown wealthy from contracts to supply the Ottoman army, and had considerable influence at the Ottoman court. She was first married to Alexandru Coconul (1611–1632), Prince of Wallachia. Some Greek sources state instead that she was married to the Prince of Wallachia Matei Basarab, but this is likely an error. Alexandra contracted smallpox just days before the wedding, which cost her her one eye and disfigured her face. When her husband saw that, he sent her back to Constantinople. There she fell in love with the Chiot silk merchant Nikolaos and married him. The marriage produced eight children, five boys and three girls: Ioannis (1633), Skarlatos (1636), Kokona (1638), Georgios (1639), Konstantinos (1640), Alexander Mavrokordatos the Exaporite (1641-1709), Mariora (1642), and Zoitza (1653). This began the rise of the Mavrokordatos family to prominence.

Loxandra was very well educated, and possessed of a strong character. After two unhappy marriages, she became the first Greek woman to start a salon in the Ottoman Empire. Christian Greeks were not obliged to obey the Islamic laws of restriction in contacts between the sexes, which made a literary salon possible. Her example was soon followed by other Greek women, and she became quite influential in society as the centre of political discussions.

In 1683, her son Alexander participated in the Battle of Vienna and was blamed for the Ottoman loss to Austria, and Alexandra was accused by the Turks of having encouraged his alleged treason because of her wish to liberate Greece from Ottoman rule. She was arrested and put in jail, where she died at the age of 79 in 1684.

== Sources ==
- Stamatiadis, Epameinondas (1865). Βιογραφίαι τῶν Ἑλλήνων Μεγάλων Διερμηνέων τοῡ Ὀθωμανικοῡ Κράτους [Biographies of the Greek Great Dragomans of the Ottoman State] (in Greek). Athens: K. Tefarikis.
- Tzelepis, Dimitrios (2020). Τα Ρωμαϊκά του Αλέξανδρου Μαυροκορδάτου: κριτική έκδοση [Roman History of Alexander Mavrocordatos: critical edition] (PhD thesis) (in Greek). Democritus University of Thrace.
- Vakalopoulos, Apostolos E. (1973). Ιστορία του νέου ελληνισμού, Τόμος Δ′: Τουρκοκρατία 1669–1812 – Η οικονομική άνοδος και ο φωτισμός του γένους (Έκδοση Β′) [History of modern Hellenism, Volume IV: Turkish rule 1669–1812 – Economic upturn and enlightenment of the nation (2nd Edition)] (in Greek). Thessaloniki: Emm. Sfakianakis & Sons.
