= Moise Movilă =

Prince of Moldavia (r. 1630–1631; 1633–1634)

Prince of Moldavia (1st reign)
- Reign: 28 April 1630 – November 1631
- Predecessor: Alexandru Coconul
- Successor: Alexandru Iliaș

Prince of Moldavia (2nd reign)
- Reign: 2 July 1633 – April 1634
- Predecessor: Miron Barnovschi-Movilă
- Successor: Vasile Lupu
- Born: 1596
- Died: 1661 (aged 64–65)
- Dynasty: Movileşti
- Religion: Eastern Orthodox

Moise Movilă (Polish: Mojżesz Mohyła; 1596–1661) was the voivode (prince) of Moldavia twice: between April 28, 1630 and November 1631, and between July 2, 1633 – April 1634. Of the Movileşti boyar and princely family, Moise was Simion Movilă's son and brother of Gabriel Movilă and Mihail Movilă.

He obtained the throne from the Ottoman overlord through bribery and intrigue against Alexandru Iliaş. After replacing Iliaş, Moise Movilă distinguished himself only through his determination to stay on the throne in Iaşi. Nevertheless, Iliaş took an opportunity to retrieve his position in late 1631.

After Miron Barnovschi Movilă's assassination in Istanbul, Moise was given back his office on the orders of Sultan Murad IV, in the hope that the gesture would pacify Moldavia after the rebellion of boyars led by Vasile Lupu. The Prince chased away Vasile Lupu, who benefited from the protection of Wallachian Prince Matei Basarab and that of Mehmet Abza, Pasha of Silistra.

Although expected to take the side of the Turks in the Polish-Ottoman War in 1633, Moise continued his family traditional friendship with Poland, and started furnishing false information to the Porte. The moment this was discovered, a kapucu was sent to depose him. Moise fled to Poland, carrying off the large fortune he had gathered during his rule.

| Preceded by Miron Barnovschi-Movilă | Prince/Voivode of Moldavia; 1630–1631 | Succeeded by Alexandru Iliaş |
| Preceded by Alexandru Iliaş | Prince/Voivode of Moldavia; 1633–1634 | Succeeded by Vasile Lupu |
