= Tamás Borsos =

Mayor of Marosvásárhely
- In office 1599–1604
- Preceded by: György Köpetzi
- Succeeded by: János Nagy Szabó
- Constituency: Marosvásárhely

Ambassador to the Sublime Porte
- In office 1613, 1618 – 1620

Personal details
- Born: 14 June 1566 Marosvásárhely (now Târgu Mureș)
- Died: after 1633
- Occupation: Diplomat

Tamás Borsos de Ozd (Hungarian ponounciation:[borʃoʃtɒmaːʃ]; Marosvásárhely, 14 June 1566 – after 1633) was a Hungarian politician and diplomat in the Principality of Transylvania, who served as mayor of Marosvásárhely (now: Târgu Mureș, Romania), then ambassador of Gabriel Bethlen, Prince of Transylvania to the Ottoman Empire.

== Life ==
He was the son of historian Sebestény Borsos. In 1597, he served as notary, from 1602 till 1604, he was the mayor (chief judge) of Marosvásárhely.

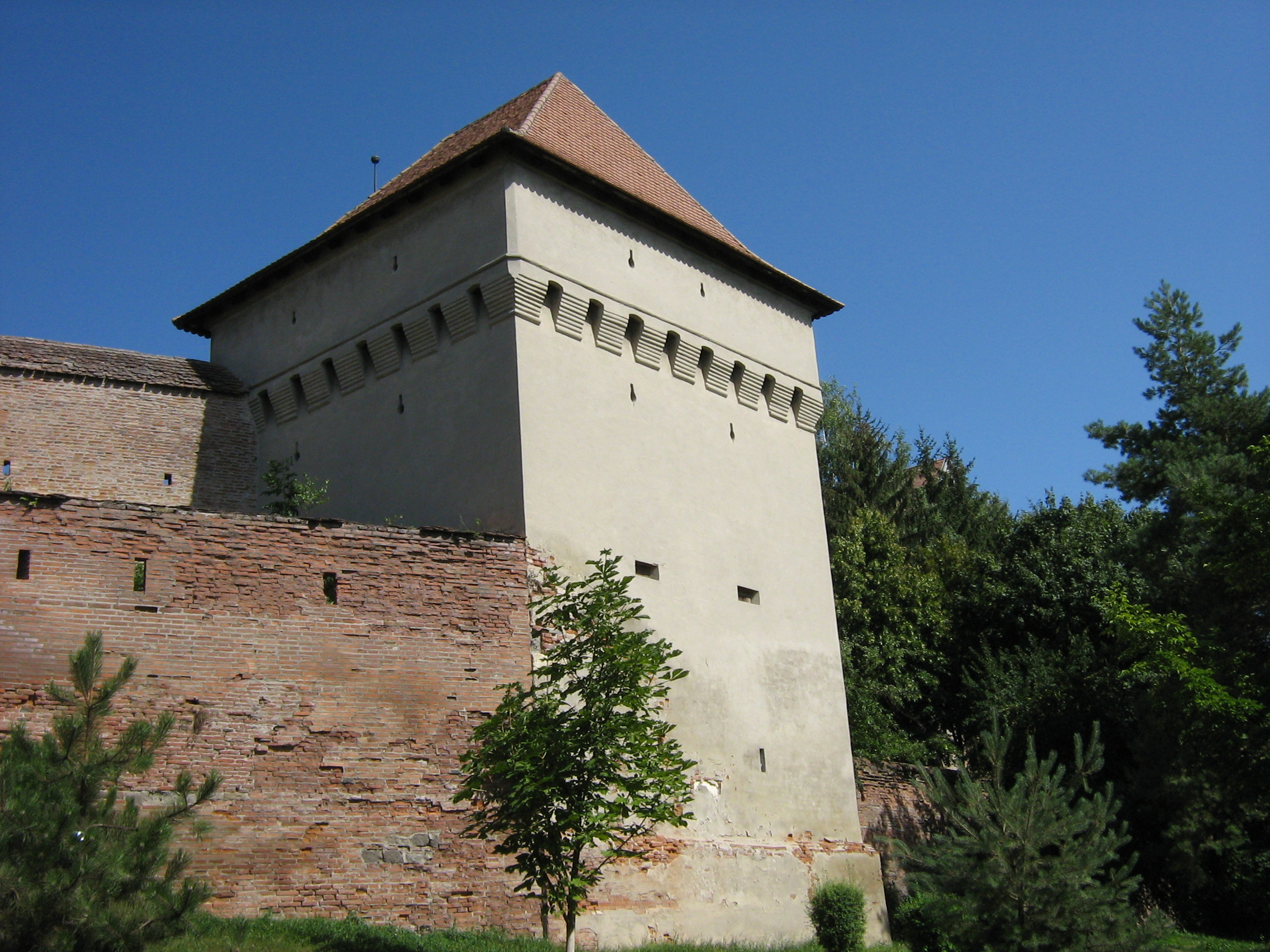
One of the bastions of the Fortress of Marosvásárhely

During the fights of the Long War, the old fortress of Marosvásárhely was destroyed, and did not give shelter to the inhabitants. Among many townfolk, Tamás Borsos found shelter in Kronstadt (Hungarian: Brassó, Romanian: Braşov), city of the Transylvanian Saxons. Seeing the city's castle, he was said to exclaim: "Oh, if only I could build just one of its bastions in Marosvásárhely, there would be no need for the people to seek refuge in the woods in case of danger". During the time of his office as chief judge he wrote several applications to the prince of Transylvania and to the Turkish sultan to request permission to construct a fortress. After obtaining the necessary approvals, the construction began in 1602. First, the damaged fortress church was restored, then the bastions and the ten-meter thick walls were built. The city's population contributed significantly to the construction of the castle and bastions as the guilds of the city undertook the construction costs and work of five out of seven bastions.

He was the representative of his hometown on the session of the Transylvanian parliament held in Dés (now: Dej, Romania) in 1603. From 1605, he was appointed judge to the High Court of the Prince of Transylvania (Hungarian: fejedelmi tábla). In 1606, he was a member of the Transylvanian parliament, and made known to prince István Bocskay that Marosvásárhely recognised his rule.

Tamás Borsos is renowned for being one of the first Hungarian diplomats. In the years of 1613, 1618 and 1625, he was the ambassador (Turkish: kapu kethüdasi, Hungarian: kapitiha) of Transylvania to the Sublime Porte of the Ottoman Empire, in Constantinople. He acted as a commissioner of Prince Gabriel Bethlen at peace treaties of Nagyszombat (1615) and of Gyarmat (1625). In 1630, he was the envoy of Transylvania to the Turkish vezir of Buda. He died after 1633.

His diplomatic letters written in Hungarian language to Gabriel Bethlen, prince of Transylvania, and his other manuscripts are important sources for the study of the political history of Transylvania.

== Works ==
- Manuscripts describing the political events in Transylvania between 1584 and 1612
- Diary on his first diplomatic mission to the Sublime Porte (1614)
- Diary on his second diplomatic mission to the Sublime Porte (1618–20)
- Memoriale (diplomatic mission to the vezír of Buda in 1630)
- Vásárhelytől a Fényes Portáig ("From Vásárhely to the Sublime Porte"). Mémoires and diplomatic correspondence of Tamás Borsos, published in 1972 by Kriterion Könyvkiadó, Bucharest

== Bibliography ==
- Szamota István: Régi magyar utazók (Old Hungarian Travellers (Nagybecskerek, 1892).
- Barts Gyula: Marosvásárhelyi Borsos Tamás élete és történeti szereplése (Life and Historical Activity of Tamás Borsos of Marosvásárhely (Kolozsvár, 1912).
- Szinnyei, József (2000), Magyar írók élete és munkái [Life and Works of Hungarian Writers] (in Hungarian), Budapest: Arcanum, ISBN 978-9638602992
