= Miron Barnovschi-Movilă =

Prince of Moldavia (r. 1626–1629; 1633)

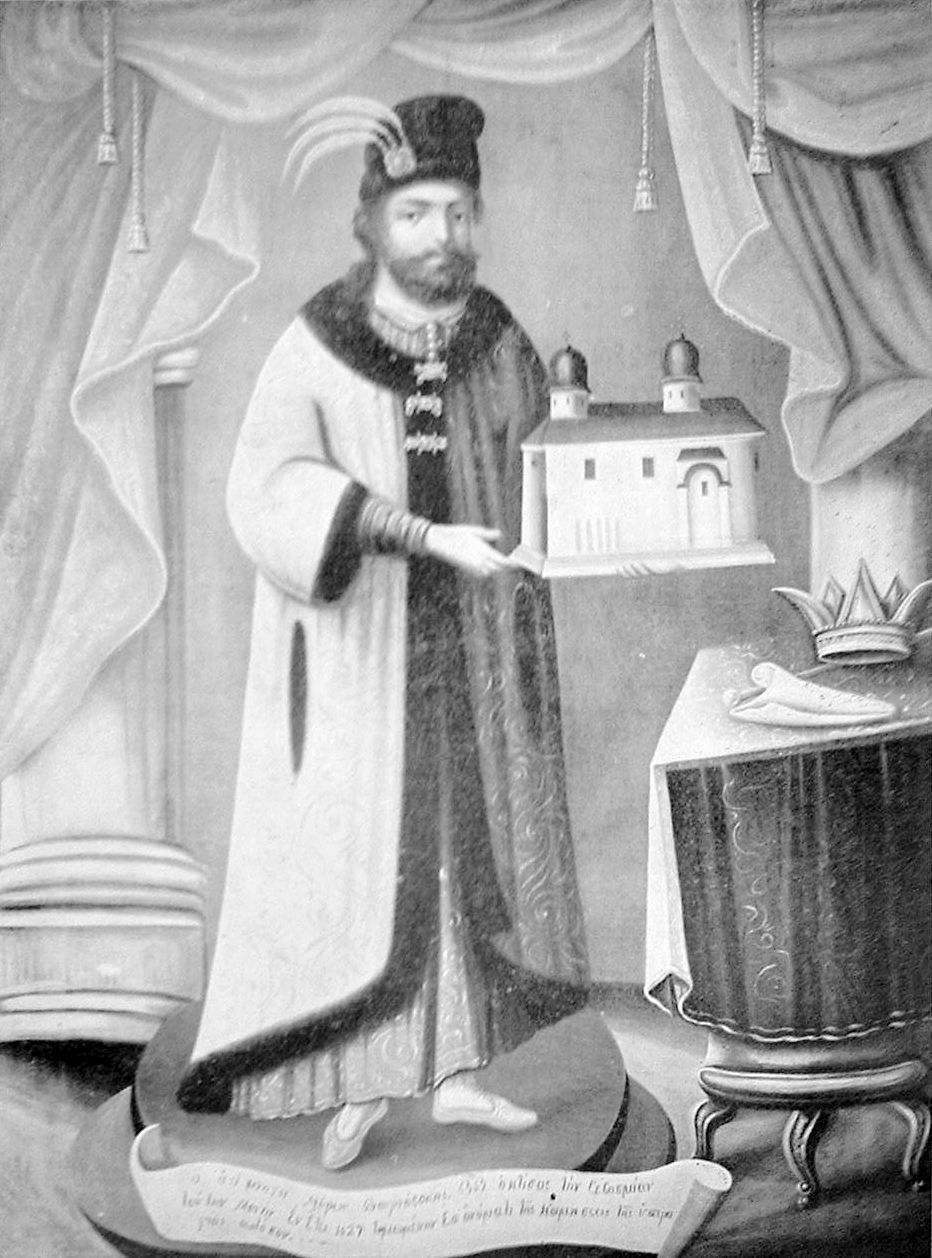

Prince of Moldavia (1st reign)
- Reign: 13 January 1626 – July 1629
- Predecessor: Radu Mihnea
- Successor: Alexandru Coconul

Prince of Moldavia (2nd reign)
- Reign: April – 2 July 1633
- Predecessor: Alexandru Iliaş
- Successor: Moise Movilă
- Born: 1590; Toporivtsi
- Died: 2 July 1633 (aged 42–43); Istanbul
- Dynasty: Movileşti family
- Father: Dimitrie Barnovschi
- Religion: Eastern Orthodox

Miron Barnovschi Movilă (1590 – 2 July 1633) was the prince of Moldavia from 1626 to 1629 and again in 1633.

== Life ==
=== Family background ===
Miron Barnovschi comes from a family of Moldovan boyars of Polish origin (Barnowski). His father Dimitrie had held high office in the Moldavian court where he was "Mare Postelnic" ("Grand Chamberlain") from 1599 to 1606. His grandfather Thomas Barnovschi had been one of the leaders of the conspiracy of the boyars who had ended to the reign of John the Despot in 1563.

By his mother, the family of Moldovan boyars Movilă, was also the grand-nephew of the princes Ieremia Movilă and Simion Movilă.

=== Reign ===
Barnovschi assumes high office with the princes of Moldavia: he is "Spătar" ("Constable") from 1615 to 1618, "Pârcălab" ("Châtelain") of Hotin from 1618 to 1622 and "Hetman" ("Military Governor" ") from Suceava from 1622 to 1626.

At the end of his reign, his father-in-law Radu Mihnea, weakened by the disease, gives him an important role in the management of the country. It is for this reason that at the death of the prince on January 13, 1626, the boyars elect him as prince and that his appointment is confirmed by the "Sublime Porte".

According to the genealogy "Europaische Stammtafeln", Miron Barnovschi married a daughter of Prince Radu Mihnea. In his book on the reign Miron Barnovschi, Aurel Golimaş presents another version of the facts: in 1614, Barnovschi married a commoner, Elena Vartic (died in 1622). Towards the end of Radu Mihnea's reign, Miron Barnovschi promised to marry Mihnea's daughter, Ecaterina. However, he did not respect his commitment, which Princess Ecaterina would never have forgiven him. In 1626 he would have contracted a union with a Polish princess.

On the religious level, his reign in Moldova is characterized by his attention to the construction of religious monuments. He built the Barnovschi Monastery in his family fiefdom and also fortified the Dragomirna Monastery which had been built in 1609 under the auspices of Atanasie Crimca, Metropolitan of Moldova from 1608 to 1629. He was also responsible for the construction of the Church of St. John of Iasi.

On the secular level, however, Miron Barnovschi Movilă left a bad memory in the Moldavian peasantry, because it is he who introduced serfdom by his decree of January 16, 1628, which fixes the peasants to the land of their lord in their forbidding to move freely.

The following year, he refused to accept the increase in tribute that the Grand Vizier wanted to impose on Moldova. In August 1629, he had to give up his throne to his young brother-in-law Alexander the "little gentleman", son of Radu Mihnea. He then retired to Poland, which does not fail to awaken the suspicion of the Ottomans.

In April 1633, after Prince Alexandru Iliaş was driven out by a rebellion of the boyars, the latter again appointed him as a prince. Miron then decides to go personally to Istanbul (Constantinople) to obtain the confirmation of his election. It takes nearly two months to reach the capital of the Ottoman Empire because he stops in Bucharest where he meets Prince Matei Basarab which reinforces the distrust of the Ottomans against him. When he finally arrives in Istanbul at the end of June, the intrigues led by his opponents, notably the future prince Vasile Lupu, did their job: the Ottoman government refuses to recognize him and condemns him to death.

== Death ==
Miron Barnovschi-Movilă is beheaded on July 2, 1633 for the Divan under the Sultan's eyes. His body is left in the yard until evening. The Grand Vizier then released the "Postelnic" Iancu Costin (father of the historian Miron Costin) who had been arrested with him, so that he had the remains removed and transported to the Orthodox Patriarchate. From there, Prince Vasile Lupu will later transfer his remains to Moldova.

His cousin Musa Movilă, who had married Radu Mihnea's daughter Ecatarina, is named to succeed him.

== Sources ==
- Alexandru Dimitrie Xenopol Histoire des Roumains de la Dacie trajane : Depuis les origines jusqu'à l'union des principautés. E Leroux Paris (1896)
- Nicolas Iorga Histoire des Roumains et de la romanité orientale. (1920)
- (in Romanian) Constantin C. Giurescu & Dinu C. Giurescu, Istoria Românilor Volume III (depuis 1606), Editura Ştiinţifică şi Enciclopedică, București, 1977.
- Jean Nouzille La Moldavie, Histoire tragique d'une région européenne, Ed. Bieler, ISBN 2-9520012-1-9.
- Gilles Veinstein, Les Ottomans et la mort (1996) ISBN 9004105050.
- Traian Sandu, Histoire de la Roumanie, Perrin (2008).
- Joëlle Dalegre Grecs et Ottomans 1453-1923. De la chute de Constantinople à la fin de l'Empire Ottoman, L'Harmattan Paris (2002) ISBN 2747521621.

Preceded by Radu Mihnea	Prince/Voivode of Moldavia; 1626–1629	Succeeded by Alexandru Coconul
Preceded by Alexandru Iliaş	Prince/Voivode of Moldavia; 1633	Succeeded by Moise Movilă
