= Radu Iliaș =

Prince of Wallachia in 1632

Radu Iliaș (died 1632) was the prince of Wallachia between July 21/31, 1632 and September 20/30, 1632.

== Biography ==
He was the son of Alexandru Iliaș, Prince of Wallachia between 1616–1618 and 1627–1629. The date of his birth and the date of his death are unknown. He married Stanca Brâncoveanu, daughter of Constantin Brâncoveanu.

He became Prince when the Ottoman Sublime Porte deposed his predecessor Leon Tomșa. However, he did not manage to occupy the throne, because Matei Basarab, occupied the throne with the help of George I Rákóczi, Prince of Transylvania and also with the support of the Pasha of Silistra. Radu Iliaș tried to take back his throne, but in the Battle of Plumbuita Monastery on October 20/30, 1632, his forces were defeated.

Following negotiations with the Porte, Matei Basarab received the title and the investiture flag and became the next Prince of Wallachia.

Preceded by Leon Tomșa	Prince of Wallachia; 1632–1632	Succeeded by Matei Basarab
