= Alexandru Iliaș =

Prince of Wallachia from 1616-1618, and 1628-1629

Alexandru Iliaş
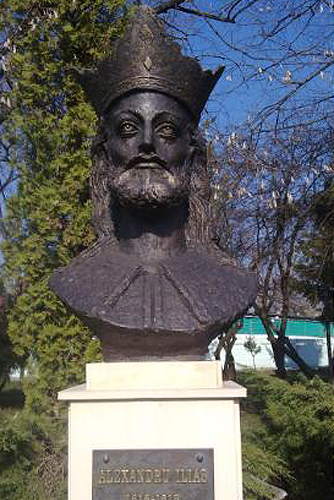

Prince of Wallachia (1st reign)
- Reign: September 1616 – May 1618
- Predecessor: Gabriel Movilă
- Successor: Gabriel Movilă

Prince of Moldavia (1st reign)
- Reign: 10 September 1620 – October 1621
- Predecessor: Gaspar Graziani
- Successor: Ștefan IX Tomșa

Prince of Wallachia (2nd reign)
- Reign: January 1628 – October 1629
- Predecessor: Alexandru Coconul
- Successor: Leon Tomșa

Prince of Moldavia (2nd reign)
- Reign: 5 December 1631 – April 1633
- Predecessor: Moise Movilă
- Successor: Miron Barnovschi-Movilă
- Died: 1666
- Issue: Radu XI Iliaș, Iliaș Alexandru
- Dynasty: Bogdan-Mușat
- Father: Iliaş
- Religion: Orthodox

Alexandru IV Iliaș (died 1666) was Prince of Wallachia from 1616 to 1618, then from 1628 to 1629, and Prince of Moldavia from 1620 to 1621 and 1631 to 1633.

== Life ==
Alexandru IV Iliaș was the son of Ilie, or Iliaș, himself son of Alexandru IV Lăpușneanu, Prince of Moldavia. His father was elected Prince of Wallachia in March 1591 but he could not win against Radu.

Alexandru IV was approved Prince of Wallachia by the Ottomans from September 1616 to November 1618 and from October 1629 to September 10, 1630. He was also Prince of Moldavia under the name Alexandru Ilie from September 10, 1620 (after the Battle of Țuțora) to October 1621 and from December 1631 to April 1633; he died the same year (or 1666).

From an unknown wife he left two sons:

- Radu XI Iliaș, Prince of Wallachia;
- Iliaș Alexandru, Prince of Moldavia.

== Sources ==
- Alexandru Dimitrie Xenopol Histoire des Roumains de la Dacie trajane: Depuis les origines jusqu'à l'union des principautés. E. Leroux Paris (1896)
- Nicolas Iorga Histoire des Roumains et de la romanité orientale. (1920)
- (in Romanian) Constantin C. Giurescu & Dinu C. Giurescu, Istoria Românilor Volume III (from 1606), Editura Științifică și Enciclopedică, București, 1977.
- Jean Nouzille La Moldavie, Histoire tragique d'une région européenne, Ed. Bieler, ISBN 2-9520012-1-9.
- Gilles Veinstein, Les Ottomans et la mort (1996) ISBN 9004105050.
- Joëlle Dalegre Grecs et Ottomans 1453-1923. De la chute de Constantinople à la fin de l'Empire Ottoman, L'Harmattan Paris (2002) ISBN 2747521621.

Preceded by Gabriel Movilă	Voivode of Wallachia; 1616–1618	Succeeded by Gabriel Movilă
Preceded by Gaspar Graziani	Prince of Moldavia; 1620–1621	Succeeded by Ștefan IX Tomșa
Preceded by Alexandru Coconul	Voivode of Wallachia; 1628–1629	Succeeded by Leon Tomșa
Preceded by Moise Movilă	Prince of Moldavia; 1631–1633	Succeeded by Miron Barnovschi-Movilă
