= Celaru =

- Commune
- Location in Romania
- Coordinates: 44°3′N 24°8′E
- Country: Romania
- County: Dolj
- Area: 87 km^{2} (34 sq mi)
- Population (2021-12-01): 3,929
  - Density: 45/km^{2} (120/sq mi)
- Time zone: UTC+02:00 (EET)
  - Summer (DST): UTC+03:00 (EEST)
- Vehicle reg.: DJ

Celaru is a commune in Dolj County, Oltenia, Romania with a population of 4,593 people. It is composed of five villages: Celaru, Ghizdăvești, Marotinu de Jos, Marotinu de Sus and Soreni.
