= Wojciech Miaskowski =

Polish noble and diplomat

Wojciech Miaskowski (?-c. 1654) was a Polish noble, deputy to sejmiks (1611, 1620, 1622) and sejm (1627, 1632, 1637, 1641, 1648, 1650), diplomat and writer of diaries. Stolnik of Podole (from 1625), podkomorzy of Lwów, (from 1637). Participated in the Polish-Swedish wars and the Polish-Muscovite War. In 1638 he was a diplomatic envoy to Ferdinand III, Holy Roman Emperor, in 1640, to the Ottoman Empire. and in 1649 with Bogdan Chmielnicki. The latter diplomatic mission was a source of his memoirs, republished several time since.
