= Moldavian Magnate Wars =

Conflict in eastern Europe, 1593–1617

- Part of the Ottoman–Habsburg wars, Ottoman wars in Europe, Polish–Ottoman Wars
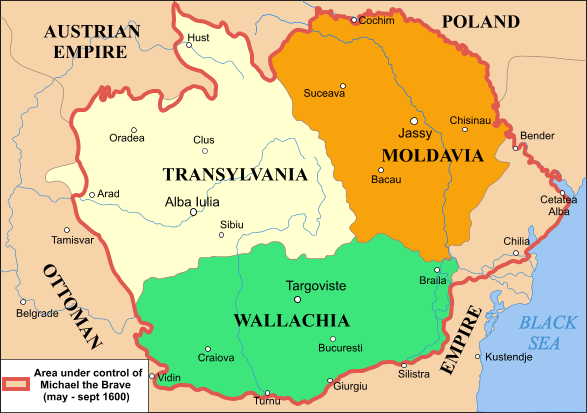
- The Romanian Principalities and their neighbors (1526–1683)
| Date | 1593–1621 |
| Location | Romania, Moldova, Ukraine, Bulgaria, Hungary, Turkey |
| Result | Treaty of Khotyn: Ottomans retains influence and control over Transylvania, Wallachia, and Moldavia, Polish-Lithuanian Commonwealth take Khotyn |

Belligerents
| (Polish–Lithuanian Commonwealth) Polish-Lithuanian Commonwealth; Zaporozhian Cossacks Registered Cossacks Moldavia: Holy Roman Empire (1599–1601 & 1618–1620); Hungary (Holy Roman Empire) Habsburgs Transylvanian Saxons Transylvania: Wallachia (1599–1601); Transylvania Székelys Hajduks Slovaks Hungarians Rusyns | Ottoman Empire; Transylvania Moldavia Wallachia Crimean Khanate Budjak Horde Nogai Horde |

Commanders and leaders
| (Polish–Lithuanian Commonwealth) Sigismund III Vasa; (Polish–Lithuanian Commonwealth) Jan Zamoyski; (Polish–Lithuanian Commonwealth) Stanisław Żółkiewski †; (Polish–Lithuanian Commonwealth) Jan Karol Chodkiewicz; (Polish–Lithuanian Commonwealth) Simon Potocki (POW); (Polish–Lithuanian Commonwealth) Samuel Korecki (POW); (Polish–Lithuanian Commonwealth) Stanisław Koniecpolski (POW); (Polish–Lithuanian Commonwealth) Crown Prince Vasa; Petro Sahaidachny; Ivan Sirko; (Moldavia) Vasile Septilici; (Transylvania) Sigismund Báthory; (Transylvania) Andrew Báthory (executed); (Moldavia) Aaron the Tyrant; (Moldavia) Ștefan Răzvan (executed); (Moldavia) Ieremia Movilă; (Moldavia) (Wallachia) Simion Movilă; (Moldavia) Constantin Movilă (POW); (Moldavia) Mihail Movilă; (Moldavia) Alexandru Movilă (POW); (Wallachia) Gabriel Movilă; (Moldavia) Gaspar Graziani (executed); (Moldavia) (Wallachia) (Transylvania) Michael the Brave; Starina Novak (executed); (Wallachia) Nicolae Pătrașcu; (Transylvania) Moses Székely; (Holy Roman Empire) Rudolf II Habsburg; (Holy Roman Empire) Giorgio Basta; (Holy Roman Empire) Ferdinand II Habsburg | (Ottoman Empire) Mehmed III; (Ottoman Empire) Ahmed I; (Ottoman Empire) Mustafa I; (Ottoman Empire) Osman II; (Ottoman Empire) Iskender Pasha; (Ottoman Empire) Güzelce Ali Pasha; (Ottoman Empire) Ohrili Hüseyin Pasha; (Ottoman Empire) Abaza Mehmed Pasha; Ğazı II Giray; Canibek Giray; Khan Temir; (Transylvania) Stephen Bocskai; (Transylvania) Sigismund Rákóczi; (Wallachia) Radu Șerban; (Transylvania) Gabriel Báthory; (Moldavia) (Wallachia) Radu Mihnea; (Transylvania) Gabriel Bethlen †; (Transylvania) George I Rákóczi; (Moldavia) Ștefan IX Tomșa; (Moldavia) (Wallachia) Alexandru Iliaș |

The Moldavian Magnate Wars, or Moldavian Ventures, refer to the period at the end of the 16th century and the beginning of the 17th century when the magnates of Poland and Lithuania intervened in the affairs of Moldavia, clashing with the Habsburgs and the Ottoman Empire for domination and influence over the principality.

== The Magnate Wars (1593–1617) ==
=== Causes ===
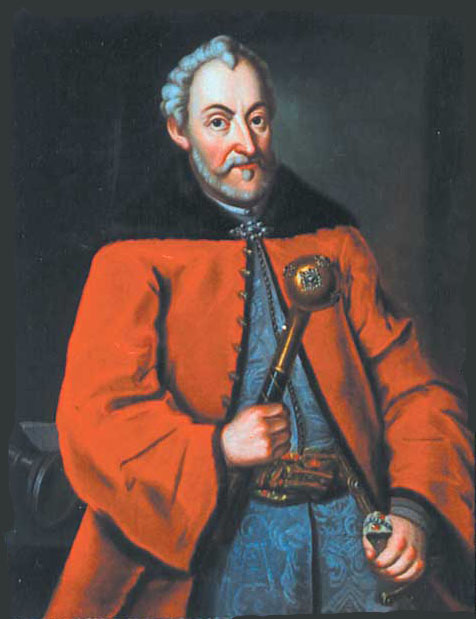
Chancellor Jan Zamoyski

Jan Zamoyski, Polish grand crown chancellor (kanclerz) and military commander (grand crown hetman), known for his opposition towards the Habsburgs, had been a vocal supporter of southward Commonwealth expansion. Since the early plans made by Commonwealth King Stefan Batory for the war against the Ottomans, Zamoyski supported them, viewing those plans as a good long-term strategy for the Commonwealth. Any policy that was against the Ottomans was also supported by the Holy See, and Pope Sixtus V strongly expressed his support for any war between the Commonwealth and the Ottomans. Three powerful magnate families from the Commonwealth, the Potockis, Koreckis and Wiśniowieckis, were related to the Moldavian Hospodar (Prince or Voivode) Ieremia Movilă (Jeremi Mohyła), and, after his death in 1606, they supported his descendants.

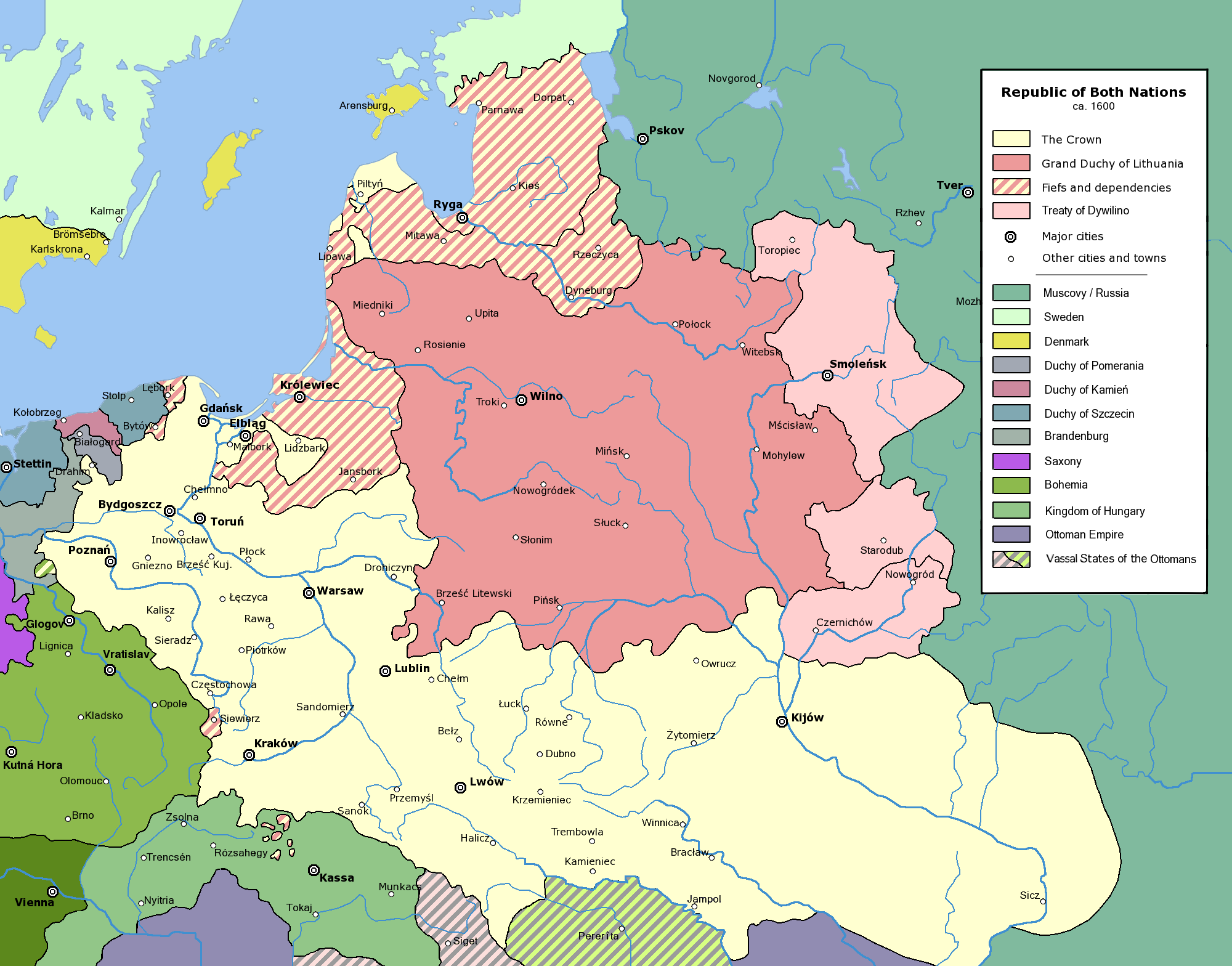
The Commonwealth at its greatest extent (c. 1630)

Around the end of the 16th century, relations between the Commonwealth and the Ottomans, never too cordial, further worsened with the growing number of independent actions by Cossacks. From the second part of the 16th century, Cossacks started raiding the territories under Ottoman rule. The Commonwealth could not control the fiercely independent Cossacks, but was held responsible for them, since at that time they were nominally under the Commonwealth rule. At the same time, Tatars living under Ottoman rule were raiding the Commonwealth. However, they attacked mostly in the south-eastern areas of the Commonwealth, which were fairly sparsely inhabited, while the Cossacks were raiding the heart of the Ottoman Empire, wealthy merchant port cities just two days away from the mouth of the Dnieper river (which the Cossacks used as their main transportation route). By 1615, Cossacks had even burned the townships on the outskirts of Constantinople. Consecutive treaties between the Ottoman Empire and the Commonwealth called both parties to curb Cossack and Tatar activities, but they were never implemented on either side of the border. In internal agreements, pushed forward by the Polish side, the Cossacks agreed to burn their boats and stop their raiding. However, Cossack boats could be built quickly, and the Cossack lifestyle required periodic hunts for glory and booty. Sometimes Cossacks just needed resources to ensure their subsistence, while on other occasions they were bribed by the Habsburgs to help ease Ottoman pressure on their borders. Also, there was widespread animosity between Cossacks and Tatars, after decades of border clashes and reciprocal looting of estates and villages. Cossacks raided Ottomans territories and their vassals near the Black Sea almost yearly, usually attracting retaliatory Tatar raids (and vice versa). The vicious circle of chaos and retaliations often turned the entire south-eastern Commonwealth border into a low-level warzone.

=== 1593–1595 ===
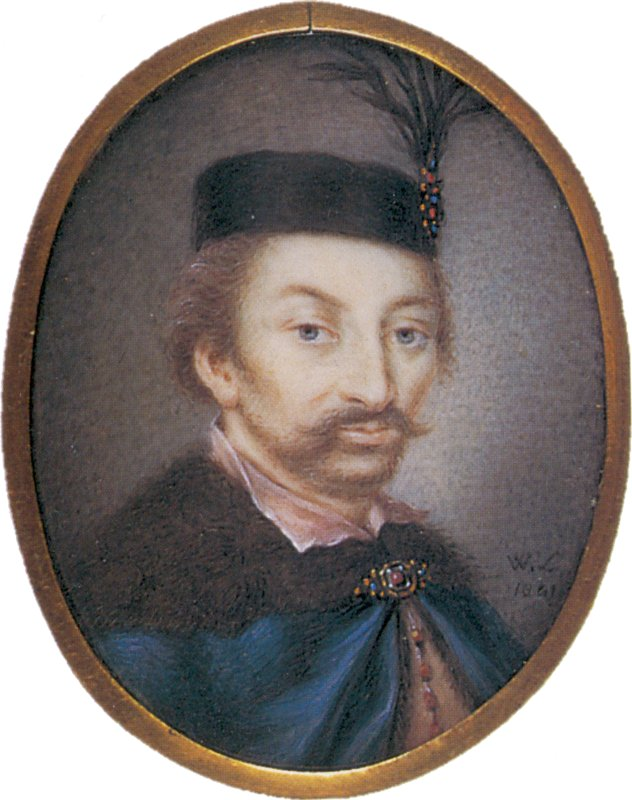
Hetman Stanisław Żółkiewski participated in the Moldavian campaign and the battle of Cecora of 1595, near the Prut river.

In 1593, war between the Ottoman Empire and the Habsburgs started. In 1594 a very strong Tatar raid, carried out by about 20,000–30,000 men led by the Khan of Crimea, Ğazı II Giray (Gazi Gerej II), plundered Pokucie and moved to Hungary through mountain passes, in order to plunder Habsburg lands. Commonwealth troops gathered too late to intercept it. The Prince of Transylvania, Sigismund Báthory (Zsigmond Báthory), nephew of former Polish king Stefan Batory (István Báthory), had strengthened Habsburg influence in Moldavia after setting Ștefan Răzvan (Stefan Rozwan) on the Moldavian throne. Ștefan Răzvan was a Roma from Wallachia (his father had been an Ottoman Muslim Roma, therefore not a slave) and had married a Moldavian noblewoman (his story was the basis of a play by 19th-century Romanian writer and historian Bogdan Petriceicu Hasdeu).

A pro-Polish hospodar was mostly tolerated by the Porte when the Commonwealth was anti-Habsburg or neutral. Therefore, when Emperor Rudolf II's forces gained control of Moldavia, Transylvania (Polish: Siedmiogród) and started supporting Mihai Viteazul (Polish: Michał Waleczny), prince of Wallachia, the Ottomans didn't look too favourably at the Commonwealth's meddling.

In 1595 Zamoyski, persuaded by Moldavian refugees, decided to intervene. The Commonwealth forces (numbering ~7,000–8,000 soldiers) under hetman Jan Zamoyski crossed the Dniester, defeated local opposition (while Transylvanian troops retreated to their own country) and Ottoman reinforcements, and set Ieremia Movilă on the Moldavian throne as a Commonwealth vassal. This was seen by many as a very dangerous step because the Ottomans were preparing to place their own candidate on the Moldavian throne. Zamoyski contacted grand vizier Sinan Pasha and negotiated with the Ottoman governor on the Black Sea island of Tyahyn (near the Dnieper river) and convinced them of his peaceful intentions and that he did not want to fight with the Ottoman Empire. However, the Khan of Crimea, Ğazı II Giray, reacted and entered Moldavia with about 20,000 men (but no cannons and few janissaries). Zamoyski fortified his camp near Cecora at Prut river, withstood a three-day siege (17–20 October), and managed to obtain an agreement with the Ottoman Empire that recognized Movilă as hospodar (Treaty of Cecora). Moldavia became the Commonwealth's vassal and paid tribute to Constantinople at the same time (this is known as condominium—territory under rule of two sovereign powers). Not satisfied with this, previous hospodar Ștefan Răzvan invaded Moldavia, but his troops were crushed by Zamoyski and Răzvan was impaled by Movilă.

=== 1599–1601 ===
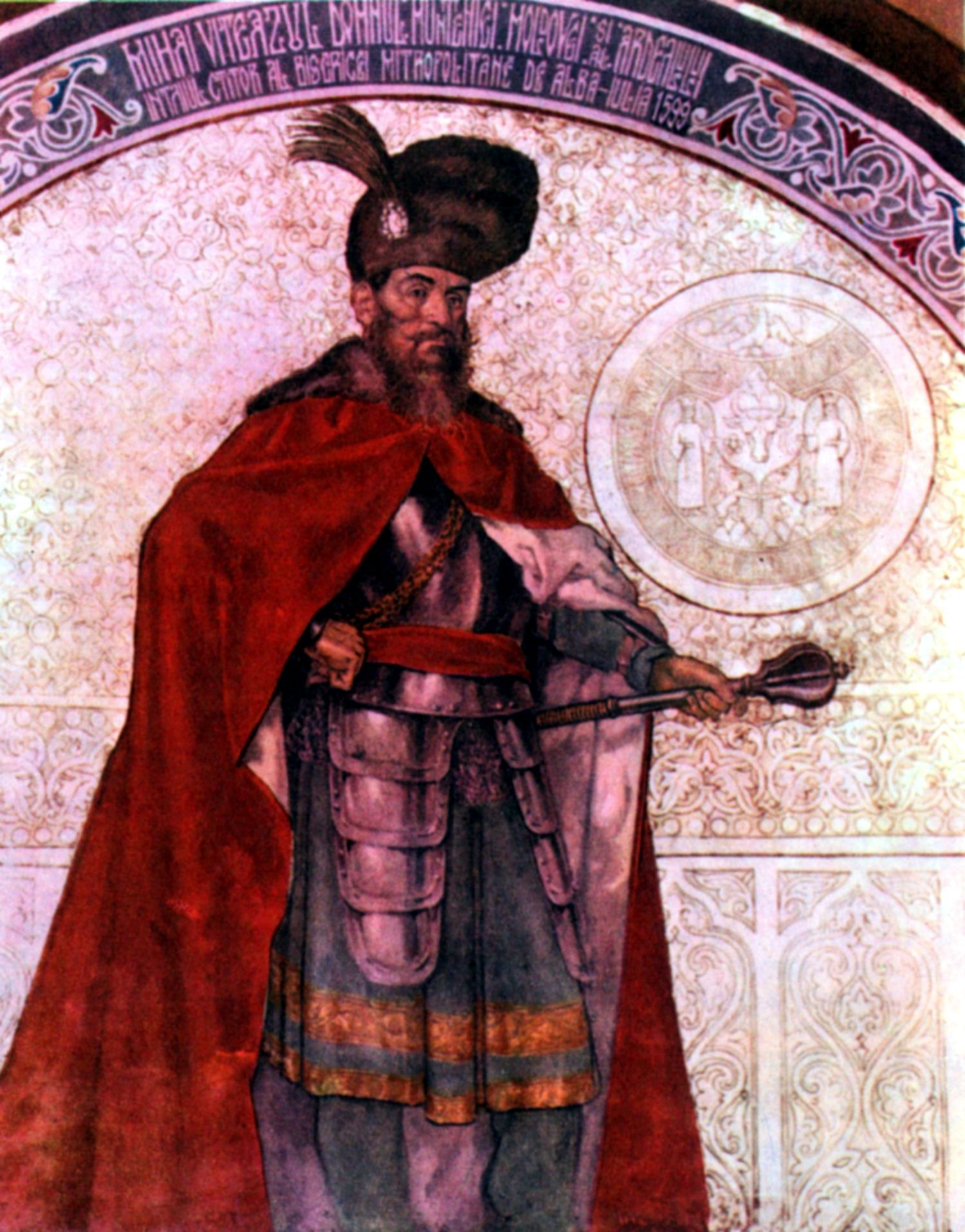
Mihai Viteazul, Voivode of Wallachia, Transylvania and Moldavia

In 1599, Mihai Viteazul, wishing to secure his back after Sigismund Báthory's departure from the Transylvanian throne, defeated the new ruler of Transylvania, Andrew Cardinal Báthory (Andrzej Batory), who lost his life fleeing after battle, and took over Transylvania as governor on behalf of the Habsburg emperor Rudolf II. Later on, Mihai defeated Ieremia Movilă and took control over almost all of Moldavia, with the exception of Khotyn (Chocim or Hotin, a castle and a city on the right bank of the Dniester), which remained in Polish hands. Mihai used titles of voivode of Wallachia, Transylvania and Moldavia for the first time in May 1600. He tried to get recognition from Emperor Rudolf II, offered his vassalage to the Commonwealth, and organized an anti-Turkish league. After King Sigismund III Vasa (Zygmunt III Waza) refused, Mihai sent his troops to take over Pokucie (an area Moldavians were claiming to be theirs) but Commonwealth hetman Stanisław Żółkiewski met them with resistance.

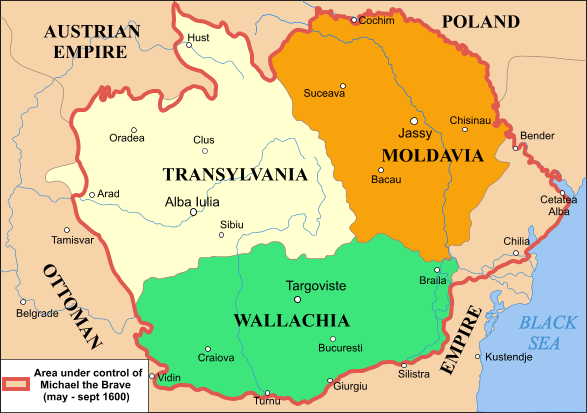
The three Principalities and the territories united under Mihai's authority for four months.

In 1600 Zamoyski and hetman Jan Karol Chodkiewicz gathered Commonwealth forces, returning to Moldavia, where they fought Mihai. Zamoyski defeated Mihai Viteazul near Bucov (Bukova) in Wallachia, on the Teleajen river, near present-day Ploiești, restored Ieremia Movilă to the throne, and helped his brother Simion Movilă to gain the throne in Bucharest, thus temporarily extending the sphere of Commonwealth influence south all the way to the Danube. In the meantime, Mihai Viteazul traveled to Vienna to ask for the Emperor's help, in exchange for assisting the Habsburgs against the Ottomans and Imperial influence over Moldavia, previously aligned with the Commonwealth. The Emperor promised help and in 1601 sent an army led by Giorgio Basta that was to accompany Mihai on the way back. Upon their arrival in Transylvania, after the joint victory at Gurăslău against the prince of Transylvania, Sigismund Báthory, general Basta assassinated Mihai Viteazul during the night, on the field of Câmpia Turzii (south of Cluj), effectively taking Transylvania under the Emperor's lead.

Captain John Smith, the famous leader of the colony at Jamestown, Virginia and the Pocahontas story, was serving Sigismund Báthory as a mercenary. Smith was captured, and sold to Crimean Tatar slave traders. He later escaped to Poland before continuing on to England, from where he sailed to America in 1607.

The Commonwealth was unable to capitalize on its gains, as the Polish–Swedish war had just started and the majority of Commonwealth forces were desperately needed to protect Livonia (Inflanty). A year later, Simion Movilă was ousted from the Wallachian throne by local boyars who replaced him with Radu Șerban, with the consent of the Ottomans (relieved to see the Polish influence at the Danube diminish). The Commonwealth managed to retain control over Moldavia, and the only side not to gain anything was the Habsburgs: in fact, they lost control over all of their former possessions in the region. However, the Peace of Žitava ended the Habsburg-Ottoman conflict known as the Long War, and forced the Ottomans to recognize the Habsburgs as equals, due to the former's inability to penetrate royal Hungary. This ended direct war between the Ottomans and the Habsburgs for decades, but the two powers still struggled for influence in the region that constitutes modern-day Romania.

=== 1607–1613 ===
Ieremia Movilă died in 1606. In 1607 Stefan Potocki set his brother-in-law (and son of Ieremia), Constantin Movilă (Konstanty Mohyła), on the Moldavian throne. However, Stefan Potocki was one of the pro-Habsburg magnates and Gabriel Báthory, the anti-Habsburg ruler of Transylvania, removed Constantin Movilă in 1611. The Moldavian throne now fell to Ștefan II Tomșa (Tomża).

A second intervention by Stefan Potocki (with tacit assistance from Sigismund III, but against the will of Sejm and Senate) in 1612 was a complete failure. Potocki's 7,000 strong army was defeated on 19 July in the Battle of Sasowy Róg (near Ștefănești) by troops of Tomșa and Khan Temir's Tatars of the Budjak Horde. Stefan Potocki and Constantin Movilă ended their lives in Ottoman captivity in Constantinople. A counter-raid of Tatars and Tomșa on the Commonwealth was stopped by Żółkiewski without a fight, and an agreement between Żółkiewski and Tomșa was signed in October 1612 (at Khotyn). Tomșa assured about his friendliness, that he will help to patch up conflict between the Ottoman Empire and the Commonwealth and pledged allegiance to the Polish king.

In 1613, when Sigismund signed a de facto anti-Turkish defensive treaty with the Habsburgs, counting on their support for his restoration to the Swedish throne, Poland further moved into the enemy camp from the Ottoman point of view. Hetman Stanisław Żółkiewski, with a show of force, induced Moldavians and Turks to compromise and signed an agreement in 1612 with Ștefan Tomșa at Khotyn.

=== 1614–1617 ===
In 1614 Sultan Ahmed I wrote Sigismund III that he was sending Ahmed Pasha to punish “those bandits”, that this was not meant as a gesture of hostility to the Commonwealth, and that he asked of him not to be a host to fugitives; Ahmed Pasha wrote hetman Żółkiewski asking for cooperation. Żółkiewski answered that he had already done a lot in order to curb Cossack attacks, and that most of the Cossacks raiding Ottoman lands were not the Zaporozhian Cossacks of the Commonwealth, but rather Don Cossacks (and thus Muscovy subjects). Żółkiewski's troops made another demonstration, but Ahmed Pasha did not attempt to cross the border, and settled for building new fortifications in the region of Ochakov (Oczaków, tr:Ozi) in order to prevent future raids.

In 1615, Ieremia Movilă's widow and dukes Michał Wiśniowiecki and Samuel Korecki organized a third intervention, this time carried against King Sigismund's wishes. Their troops consisted of their own private troops, mercenaries, Cossacks and Moldavians loyal to Movilă. Tomșa was removed and the young Alexandru Movilă (Aleksander Mohyła) was set on the throne. But this situation was not to last: in August 1616 Iskender Pasha, beylerbey (bejlerbej) of Bosnia, defeated magnate forces on the very same spot at Sasowy Róg, with Duke Samuel Korecki and the Movilă family ending up as prisoners in Constantinople (Wiśniowiecki had died prior to imprisoning). Korecki managed to escape captivity, briefly reemerged, but was taken prisoner yet again after the defeat in the Battle of Cecora in 1620 and was strangled to death while in custody.

Again in 1616, Stefan Żółkiewski managed to cool the tensions, displaying Commonwealth military readiness and signing a new agreement with the new hospodar, Radu Mihnea, in Braha. He was promised Moldavian mediation in patching up conflict between the Ottoman Empire and the Commonwealth. Radu Mihnea pledged allegiance to the Polish king and promised not to allow the Tatars passage through his territory. However, northern and eastern wars with Sweden and Muscovy diverted the attention of the Commonwealth and strained its military might to the limit. In 1617, after yet another wave of Cossack raids, the Sultan sent a powerful force under Iskender Pasha to the Commonwealth borders. The army consisted of janissaries, Tatars and vassal troops form Transylvania, Moldavia and Wallachia (numbering up to 40,000). Żółkiewski met them near Busza (on the Jaruga River), but neither side could decide to attack, and letters between leaders had been exchanged since the start of Iskender's march. Żółkiewski had mostly magnate troops and no Cossack troops, as the Commonwealth waged war with Muscovy and with new Swedish aggression on Livonia at the same time, while the Ottomans were at war with Persia. Żółkiewski was forced to renounce all Polish claims to Moldavia through the Treaty of Busza (also known as the "Treaty of Jaruga") signed with Iskender Pasha. The treaty stated that Poland would not meddle in the internal affairs of Ottoman vassals in Transylvania, Moldavia and Wallachia, the Commonwealth was to prevent Cossacks from raiding lands in the Ottoman Empire, while ceding Khotyn. In return, the Turks promised to stop Tatar raids.

== Prelude to the next conflict (1618–1620) ==
=== 1618 ===
However, few of the treaty provisions were ever fulfilled. The Tatar raids resumed in 1618 (or perhaps even 1617), as commanders of the Dobruja and Budjak hordes left Iskender's camp during talks. At first, Żółkiewki could not divide forces and Tatars plundered unopposed, but he met the Iskender Pasha's force near Kamianets-Podilskyi (Kamieniec Podolski). On September 28, 1618, he drove it back while enduring heavy losses. In 1617 and 1619 Żółkiewski forced Cossacks to sign new agreements ("umowa olszaniecka" and "biało-cerkiewna"). Boats were to be burnt and raids were forbidden. In exchange, the Cossack register was expanded, and the annual subsidy to Cossacks from the Crown was increased. However, Cossack raids did not cease, especially as they were encouraged by Muscovy. In July 1618, after many warnings to the Commonwealth, the young and ambitious Sultan Osman II sent a letter to King Sigismund III with the threats of a new war and the burning of Kraków. Since the Ottomans were involved in large-scale war with Persia, this was no more than a warning at the time. However, Osman planned for a war against the Commonwealth, in order to compensate for the heavy losses sustained against Persia, where, in the Ottoman–Persian Wars of 1603–1611 and 1617–1618/19, the Ottoman Empire lost the Caucasus.

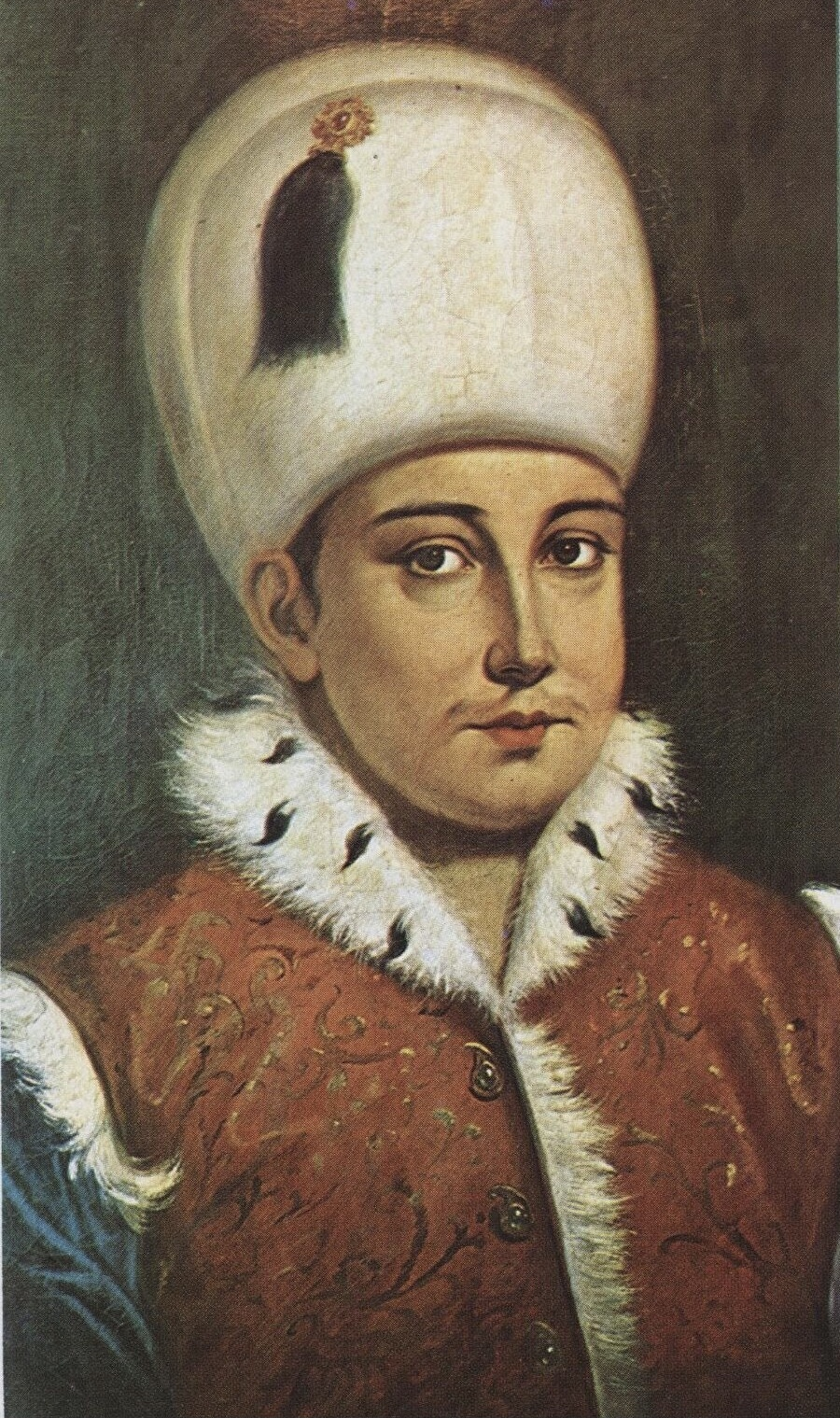
Sultan Osman II, leader of the Ottoman Empire who threatened war with Sigismund II and the burning of Kraków

In 1618, the Thirty Years' War began. Czech Protestants were supported by German and Hungarian Protestants. The Hungarians asked the then Prince of Transylvania, Gabriel Bethlen, for help and declared their wish to unite Hungary with Transylvania. Bethlen had been appointed to the office after the Sultan's removal of Gabriel Báthory (ordered to the troops of Iskender Pasha in 1613). He was anti-Polish and a loyal Ottoman vassal and had aspirations to extend his rule to Moravia, Bohemia and Silesia. Polish hetman Stefan Żółkiewski warned Bethlen against joining the Protestant side and promised help against the Ottoman Empire; however, Bethlen answered that it was too late to change allegiances. When the fight was joined by Gabriel Bethlen on the Protestant side, his siege of Vienna threatened to extend Transylvanian rule (and thus Ottoman) to Bohemia and Silesia.

=== 1619–20 ===
Polish nobles (Szlachta) supported the Czechs (at least verbally) because the struggle of Czech and Hungarian nobles was viewed as a struggle of "free" nobility against absolutist monarchs. Nobles would not fight the Protestants, and the Sejm had even forbidden Sigismund III to send Polish armed forces as assistance to the Habsburgs. However, the king of Poland, Sigismund, was a devout Roman Catholic and a long time sympathizer of the Habsburgs. Additionally, some of the Polish magnates and szlachta hoped to get back some parts of Silesia in exchange for helping out the Habsburgs. During talks with Sigismund's son, Prince Władysław IV Waza, on his voyage to Silesia in mid-1619, Holy Roman Emperor Ferdinand II, promised to allow a temporary occupation of part of Silesia by the Poles, with the possibility of incorporating those areas into Poland at a later date. Some of the Piast (old Polish dynasty) dukes of Silesia also supported returning their lands to the Polish realm, especially given the attractive religious tolerance policy of the Commonwealth and the fact that the Polish western regions had been very peaceful and secure for a long time.

Sigismund III decided to help the Habsburgs and privately hired an infamous mercenary group called the Lisowczycy (name took from their founder Aleksander Józef Lisowski), who were unemployed after the end of the wars with Muscovy (Dymitriads) and were plundering and terrorizing the entire region of Lithuania. Sigismund sent the Lisowczycy to aid the Habsburgs towards the end of 1619. In the end, Ferdinand did not agree to any permanent concessions in Silesia, and only made Prince Karol Ferdynand (Władysław's brother) bishop of Wrocław. Neither did Habsburgs provide any help against the Ottoman Empire. The Lisowczycy crushed Transylvanian forces led by George I Rákóczi (Jerzy Rakoczy) at Závada, Humenné District and Humenné (November 13 or 21–24, sources vary; see Battle of Humenné) and started looting, plundering, killing even children and dogs (as a contemporary historian wrote), and burning Eastern Slovakia, thus forcing Bethlen to lift his siege of Vienna and try to save his own lands. Later, the Lisowczycy plagued Silesia and Bohemia and took part in the Battle of White Mountain.

The ruler of Moldavia, another vassal of the Ottoman sultan, a hospodar of Italian origin, Gaspar Graziani (Kasper Gratiani in Polish), decided he would be better off under Polish rule and started talks with the Polish king, promising to send 25,000 men. The Polish envoy to Constantinople who arrived in April 1620, was received very coldly. Later Cossack raiding and burning of Constantinople suburbs did not help.

The Habsburgs had no qualms about repaying Sigismund's help with treachery. Their envoy actively worked against a new treaty between the Commonwealth and the Ottoman Empire because the Habsburgs knew that any Polish-Ottoman conflict meant less trouble for themselves. This intrigue, coupled with Ottomans annoyance with Commonwealth pro-Habsburg actions and constant attempts by some Polish magnates to gain influence in Moldavia, caused a new war to be unavoidable. In Poland, the king and the hetmans exaggerated the danger in order to recruit more troops and raise taxes for the army. However, the nobles did not trust such measures, and could not be convinced to pay raised taxes for the army, speculating about the reasons behind the expedition. The nobles often thwarted the king's initiatives, even if these could prove to be in the interest of the country at large (including their own long-term purpose), becoming suspicious of any rise in the king's power as a potential reduction of their privileges. The status quo, which translated into their high standard of life, was generally favoured over any alternative.

Some historians say that King Sigismund decided to intervene in Moldavia because of internal problems caused mainly by the dispatch of Lisowczycy mercenaries to the Habsburg side and their conduct in war. Others point out that some nobles threatened with armed rebellion (rokosz), and, in case of a successful intervention, the king would increase his and the hetman's authority and focus noblemen's attention on external instead of internal problems. Additionally, hetman Żółkiewski, foreseeing confrontation with the Ottoman Empire, preferred to meet their troops on foreign soil.

In retrospect, this time the nobles were right about the lack of danger since neither Tatars nor Turks were ready in 1620. While the Sultan was indeed planning an expedition to Poland in 1621, this was to be done with a small contingent. However, it can be argued that the continuous policy of neglect for the military would dearly cost the Commonwealth in the coming decades.

== Battle of Cecora and its aftermath (1620–21) ==
The next phase of the Ottoman-Commonwealth conflict would begin in 1620: the Cossacks' burning of Varna proved the last spark. The new young Ottoman sultan Osman II made peace with Persia and promised to burn the Commonwealth to the ground and "water his horses in the Baltic Sea". Żółkiewski's forces went deep into Moldavia to strike at Ottomans before they were ready, but a large Ottoman force had already invaded Moldavia to remove hospodar Graziani.

In early September 1620 the Royal Grand and Field Hetman's Zolkiewski and his protegee, future hetman Stanisław Koniecpolski, assembled 8,000 men and marched south. However, Graziani's contribution comprised just 600 men. At the Battle of Cecora (September 18 to October 6, 1620), on the river Prut, Zolkiewski met the 22,000-strong army of Iskender Pasha, withstanding repeated attacks during September 1620. On September 29 he ordered a retreat, and for eight difficult days discipline held despite enemy attacks. On approaching the Polish border, order in much of the army melted and the forces disintegrated on the spot. The Ottomans attacked and much of the Commonwealth army was destroyed. Zolkiewski was killed, his head sent to the Sultan as a trophy, while Koniecpolski was captured.

The following year, in 1621, an army of 100,000–160,000 Turkish soldiers led by Sultan Osman II in person advanced from Adrianople towards the Polish frontier, but the disaster of Cecora caused the Commonwealth to mobilise a large army (of about 25,000 Poles and 20,000 Cossacks) in response. Hetman Chodkiewicz crossed the Dniester in September 1621 and entrenched himself in the fortress of Khotyn on the very path of Ottoman advance. It was here that, for a whole month (September 2 to October 9), during the Battle of Khotyn, the Commonwealth hetman held the sultan at bay, up until the first autumn snow. The deaths of his men compelled Osman to withdraw. However, the victory was to be dearly ransomed by Poland. A few days before the siege was raised, the aged grand hetman died of exhaustion in the fortress on September 24, 1621. After his death the Polish forces were led by Stanisław Lubomirski.

Chodkiewicz wasn't the only one to die as a result. Sultan Osman himself paid the highest price for the failure of his plans. After the tides turned, the defeat and subsequent retreat of the Ottoman armies, coupled with internal matters, triggered the rebellion of janissaries in 1622, during which Osman II was murdered.

An honorable peace (Treaty of Khotyn) was agreed, based on that at Busza, and the Commonwealth-Ottoman border was to be fairly quiet until the Polish–Ottoman War (1633–1634).

== See also ==
- History of Poland in the early modern period (1569–1795)
- Sarmatism
