= Polish–Ottoman War (1620–1621) =

1620–21 conflict between Poland–Lithuania and the Ottoman Empire

- Part of the Polish–Ottoman Wars
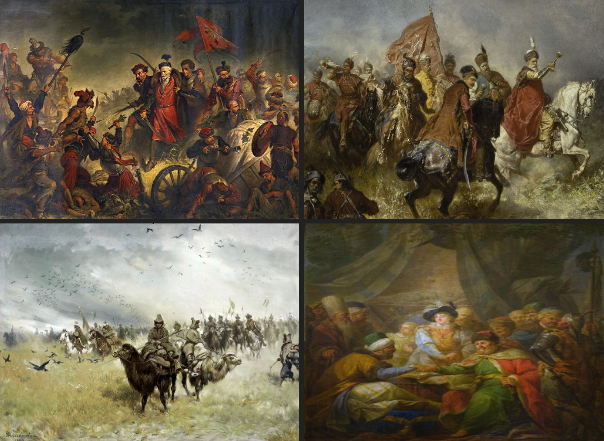
- From top left: Death of Stanisław Żółkiewski at Cecora; Jan Karol Chodkiewicz at Khotyn; Tatars in vanguard; Treaty of Khotyn
Date	1620 – 9 October 1621
Location	Moldavia and Bukovina (modern Ukraine)
Result	Inconclusive
Territorial changes	Treaty of Khotyn: Ottomans reclaim Moldavia; Ottomans given the Khotyn Fortress

Belligerents
(Polish–Lithuanian Commonwealth) Poland–Lithuania; Registered Cossacks; Zaporozhian Host; Moldavia (initially)	Ottoman Empire; Crimean Khanate; Budjak Horde; Transylvania; Moldavia; Wallachia

Commanders and leaders
(Polish–Lithuanian Commonwealth) Stanisław Żółkiewski † (Polish–Lithuanian Commonwealth) Jan Karol Chodkiewicz # (Polish–Lithuanian Commonwealth) Crown Prince Vasa; Petro Sahaidachny (WIA); Yakiv Borodovka; Ivan Sirko (Moldavia) Gaspar Graziani (executed) (Moldavia) Vasile Septilici	(Ottoman Empire) Osman II (Ottoman Empire) Güzelce Ali Pasha # (Ottoman Empire) Ohrili Hüseyin Pasha (Ottoman Empire) Abaza Mehmed Pasha; Canibek Giray; Khan Temir (Transylvania) Gabor Bethlen

Strength
25,000 Polish-Lithuanian troops 20,000 Cossacks	120,000–160,000 Ottoman and Tatar troops 13,000 Moldavian and Wallachian troops

Casualties and losses
16,000–17,000 or 22,500–23,000 (Note: Approximately 2,000–3,000 or up to 8,500–9,000 Polish casualties occurred at the Battle of Cecora (1620), alongside 14,000 casualties at the Battle of Khotyn (1621).)	41,500–81,500 (Note: Approximately 1,500 Ottoman casualties occurred at the Battle of Cecora (1620), alongside 40,000–80,000 casualties at the Battle of Khotyn (1621).)

The Polish–Ottoman War (1620–1621) was a conflict between the Polish–Lithuanian Commonwealth and the Ottoman Empire over the control of Moldavia. It ended with the Commonwealth withdrawing its claims on Moldavia and led to the eventual demise of the Sultan Osman II.

It is also known as the Khotyn War, (Note: Ukrainian: Хотинська війна, romanized: Khotynsjka vijna. Romanian: Războiul de la Hotin. Russian: Хотинская война, romanized: Hotinskaja vojna.) because it was ended by the Treaty of Khotyn (9 October 1621) in the aftermath of the final Battle of Khotyn (1621).

== Background ==
Traditionally, Moldavia had been a subject of the Kingdom of Poland, and later the Polish–Lithuanian Commonwealth. As the Ottoman influence grew in the 16th century, they had become more and more interested in the region. From the end of the 16th century and the beginning of the 17th century, the magnates of the Polish–Lithuanian Commonwealth intervened in the affairs of Moldavia, which the Ottoman Empire considered within its sphere of influence. Additionally, the Ottomans were aggravated by the constant raids of Cossacks, then nominally subjects of the Commonwealth, across the border into Ottoman territories. Another reason causing the war was the recent outbreak of the Thirty Years' War, and the request of support from the Protestant rebel leaders in Bohemia.

At the time, the Thirty Years' War was raging across Europe. Gabriel Bethlen, prince of Transylvania saw an opportunity to unite the two Hungarian principalities, Transylvania and Royal Hungary, and unsuccessfully attacked Vienna in November 1619. He also asked Sultan Osman II for aid, but this was unsuccessful. The Commonwealth was relatively uninvolved in this war but the Polish king, Zygmunt III Waza, sent an elite and ruthless mercenary unit, the Lisowczycy, to aid his Habsburg allies. They defeated the Hungarian lord George Rákóczi at the Battle of Humenné in 1619, and thus, cut the supply lines of Transylvanian forces. Then Gaspar Graziani, ruler of Moldavia, switched sides and joined Poland.

Thus, the sultan agreed to help Bethlen, gathering a large Ottoman army with the intent of a punitive invasion of the Commonwealth.

== War ==
In September 1620, Poland secured a victory at Jassy under Stanisław Żółkiewski.

In 1620, the Ottoman forces crushed the Commonwealth army at the Battle of Ţuţora (Cecora). The campaign was suspended for the winter but, in 1621, both sides resumed hostilities.

The Turks, following their victory in the Battle of Ţuţora, had high hopes of conquering Ukraine (then a part of Poland), and perhaps even toppling the Commonwealth entirely and reaching the Baltic Sea. This time, however, they were stopped by a Commonwealth army, aided by a large Cossack detachment, at the Battle of Khotyn. The 45,000 Poles and Cossacks were able to withstand an Ottoman army at least two times the size of the Commonwealth's army at Khotyn and deal severe losses to the Ottoman army throughout the month of September. When the Polish cavalry rallied forth in October they broke the will of the besiegers and the Sultan sued for peace. The ensuing peace treaty gave the Fortress of Khotyn to Moldavia as an Ottoman vassal, and the Commonwealth agreed to stop its interference in Moldavia. Both sides claimed victory, as the Commonwealth saw the battle of Khotyn as a successful stopping of the Ottoman invasion of its mainland and the Ottoman Empire achieved its goal of removing the impending threat on the Moldavian lands.

The Polish–Ottoman border would remain relatively peaceful until the Polish–Ottoman War (1633–34) and the Polish–Ottoman War (1672–76).

== See also ==
- Moldavian Magnate Wars
