= Guzelce =

Guzelce or Güzelce may refer to:

- Güzelce Ali Pasha (died 1621), Ottoman statesman
- Güzelce Dam, a dam in Turkey
- Asuman Güzelce (born 1969), Turkish writer and art teacher
- Güzelce, Bayburt, a village in Bayburt Province, Turkey
