= Battle of Khotyn (1621) =

1621 battle of the Polish–Ottoman War

- Part of the Moldavian Magnate Wars and Polish–Ottoman War (1620–1621)
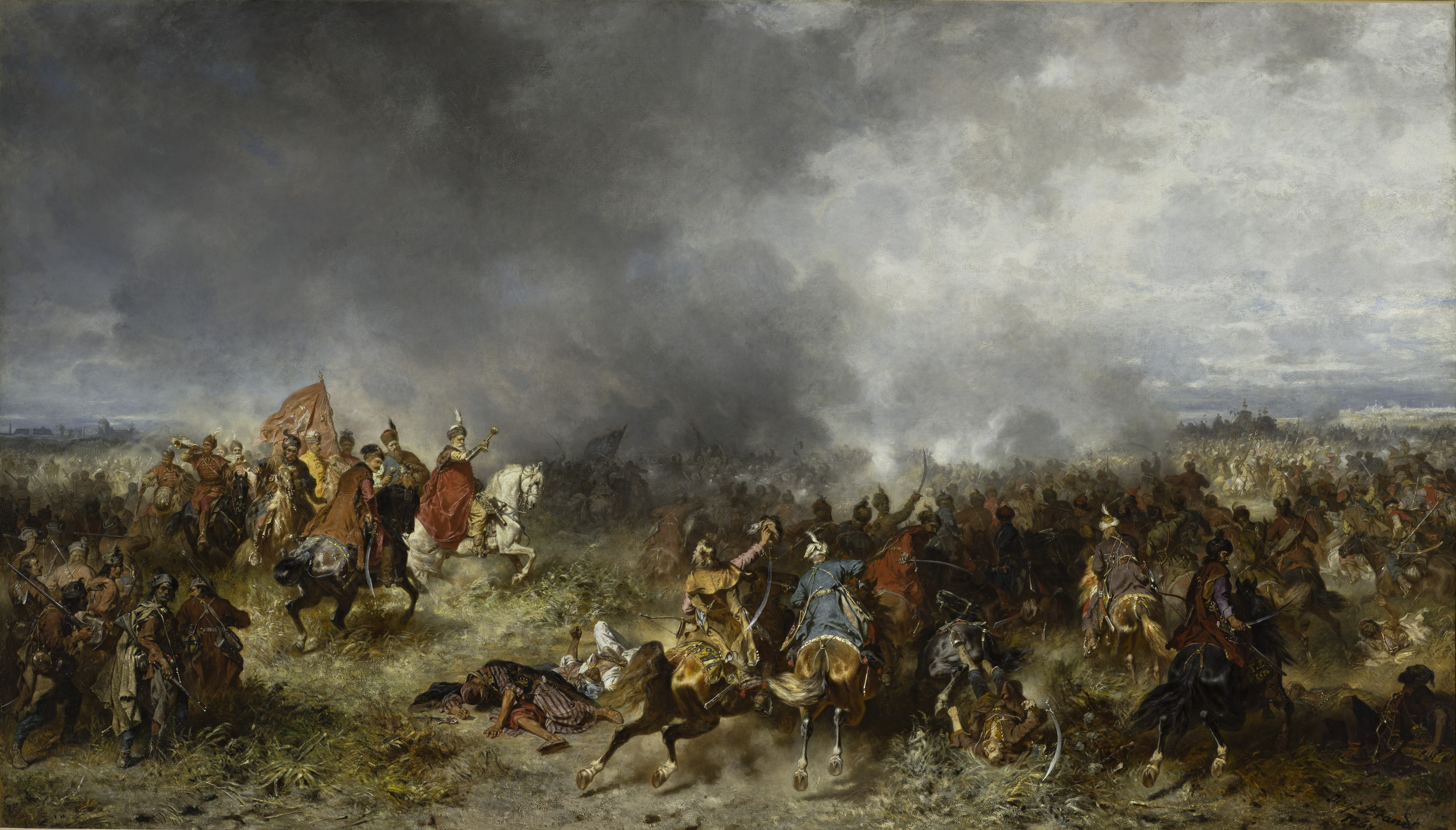
- Battle of Chocim by Józef Brandt
Date	2 September – 9 October 1621
Location	Near Khotyn (now Ukraine)
Result	Polish-Lithuanian victory
Territorial changes	Ottoman forces repulsed from Khotyn

Belligerents
Polish–Lithuanian Commonwealth; Zaporozhian Cossacks	Ottoman Empire; Crimean Khanate; Budjak Horde; Transylvania; Wallachia; Moldavia

Commanders and leaders
Jan Karol Chodkiewicz #; Stanisław Lubomirski; Władysław Vasa; Petro Sahaidachny (WIA); Ivan Sirko	Osman II; Ohrili Hüseyin Pasha; Temir; Canibek Giray

Strength
25,000 Polish-Lithuanian troops: • 4,800 Lithuanian infantry; • 3,500 Lithuanian cavalry.; 20,000–25,000 Zaporozhian Cossacks	120,000–160,000 Ottoman and Tatar, 13,000 Moldavian and Wallachian troops '34,825 Kapikulu (regular army)': ~18,000 Janissary; ~1,800 Cebeci; ~1,300 artillery corps; ~13,000 Kapikulu cavalry.

Casualties and losses
14,000 killed	40,000–80,000 killed

The Battle of Khotyn or Battle of Chocim or Khotyn War (in Turkish: Hotin Muharebesi) was a combined siege and series of battles which took place from 2 September to 9 October 1621 between a Polish–Lithuanian Commonwealth, commanded by the Grand Hetman of Lithuania Jan Karol Chodkiewicz, against an invading Ottoman Imperial army, led by Sultan Osman II, which was stopped until the first autumn snows. On 9 October, due to the lateness of the season and heavy losses – due to failed assaults on Commonwealth fortifications – the Ottomans abandoned their siege and the battle concluded with a Polish–Lithuanian–Cossack victory. Chodkiewicz died on 24 September 1621 shortly before concluding a treaty with the Turks.

== Name ==
Khotyn was conquered and controlled by many states, resulting in many name changes (Ukrainian: Хотин; Polish: Chocim; Romanian: Hotin; Turkish: Hotin). Other variations include Chotyn, or Choczim (especially in Polish).

== Prelude ==
=== Tensions between Poland–Lithuania and the Ottoman Empire ===
At the end of the 16th century and the beginning of the 17th century, the magnates of the Polish–Lithuanian Commonwealth intervened in the affairs of Moldavia, a vassal state of the Ottoman Empire since its conquest by Mehmed II in the 15th century. Additionally, the Ottomans were aggravated by the constant raids into their territories by Ukrainian Cossacks, then nominal subjects of the Commonwealth.

In the meantime, the Thirty Years' War raged across Europe. The Commonwealth was relatively uninvolved in this war but the Polish King Sigismund III Vasa sent an elite and ruthless mercenary unit, the Lisowczycy, to aid his Habsburg allies in Vienna, since his brother-in-law was the Emperor. They defeated George Rákóczi of Transylvania at the Battle of Humenné in 1619. Gabriel Bethlen, the reigning Prince of Transylvania, asked Sultan Osman II for aid. The sultan agreed and a large Ottoman army was gathered for a punitive invasion of the Commonwealth.

=== Campaign of 1620 ===
On 20 September 1620, an Ottoman army under the command of the governor of Oczakov (Ozi) Iskender Pasha routed the Commonwealth army at the Battle of Cecora, captured Stanisław Koniecpolski and beheaded Stanisław Żółkiewski, sending Tatar raiders to ravage southern Poland. The campaign was suspended for the winter. Both sides resumed hostilities in 1621.

=== Campaign of 1621 ===
==== Ottoman forces ====
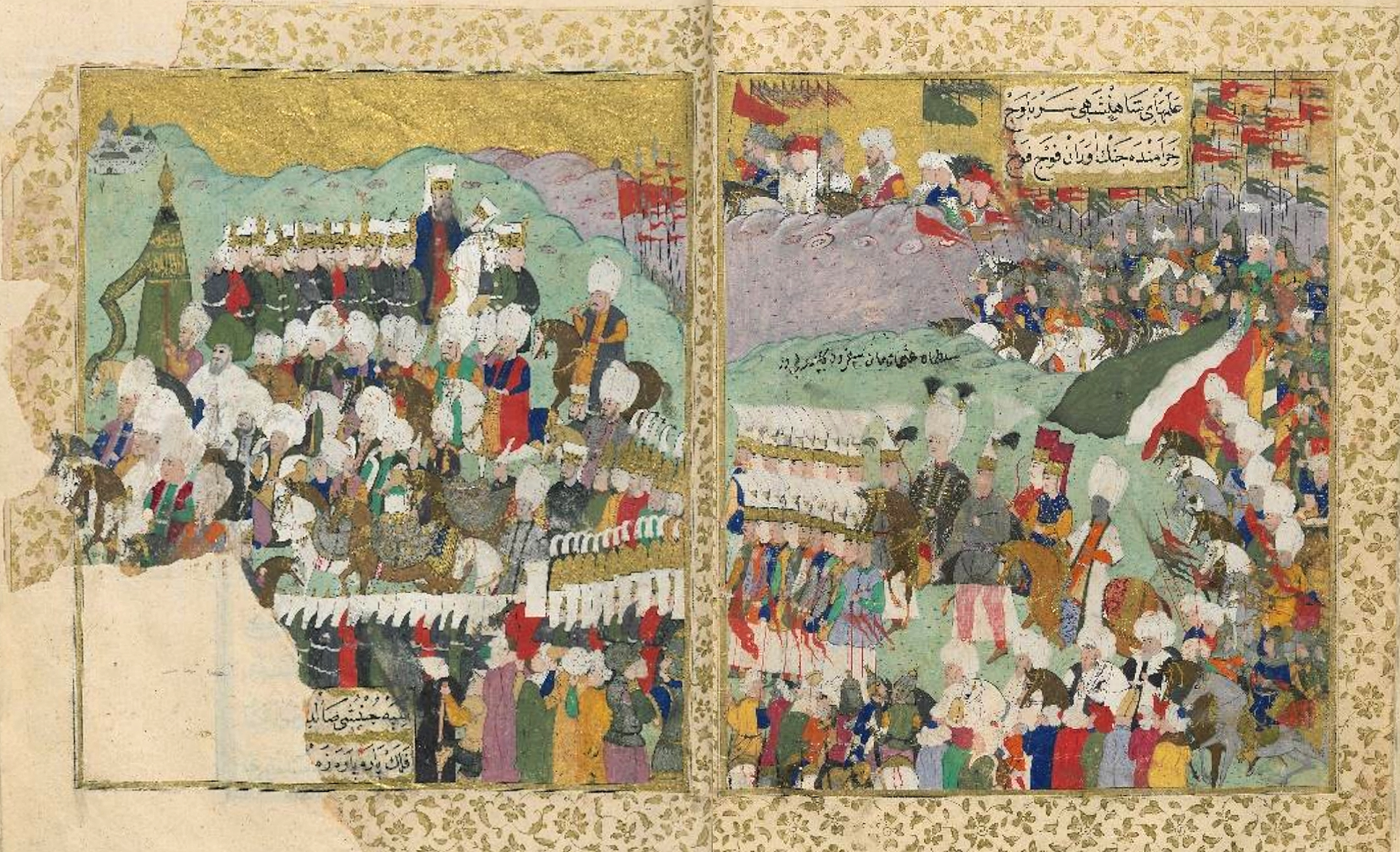
‘Osmān II and the Ottoman army proceeding for the Khotyn campaign (Şehnāme-i Nādirī, TPML, H. 1124, 53b-54a).

In April 1621 an army of 120,000–160,000 soldiers (sources vary), led by Osman II, advanced from Constantinople and Edirne towards the Polish frontier. Khan Temir of the Budjak Horde and the Khan of Crimea, Canibek Giray joined the battle on the Ottoman side. Approximately 25% of the Ottoman forces were composed of contingents from their vassal states: Tatars, Moldavians and Wallachians, a total of about 13,000 troops. The Ottoman army had about 66 heavy guns. When the Ottomans reached an area near Iași a distribution of bahşiş took place on 26/27 July. There were 34,825 paid Kapikulu soldiers, who were the regular troops. Each one was given 1,000 Akçe, for a total of 34,825,000 Akçe spent.

==== Commonwealth forces ====
In the meantime, the Commonwealth's Sejm, shaken by last year's defeat, agreed to raise taxes and fund a larger army, as well as to recruit large numbers of Cossacks. The commander of Polish-Lithuanian forces, the Grand Lithuanian Hetman Jan Karol Chodkiewicz crossed the Dniester River in September 1621 with approximately 20,000 to 35,000 soldiers, joined by 10,000 more led by the future king of Poland, Prince Władysław Vasa. This army numbered 30,000 (18,000 cavalry, 12,000 infantry) and their allied Cossack army led by ataman Petro Konashevych-Sahaidachny was composed of 25,000–40,000 troops, mostly infantry, and about 22 guns.

== Battle ==
=== Commonwealth battle plan ===
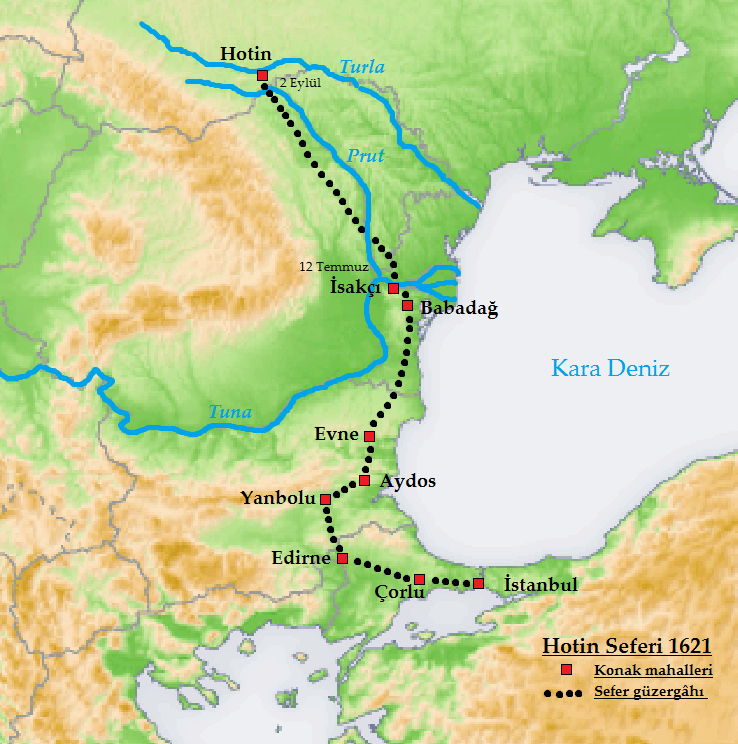
The route of the Ottoman army towards Khotyn (Hotin) which they reached on 2 September 1621

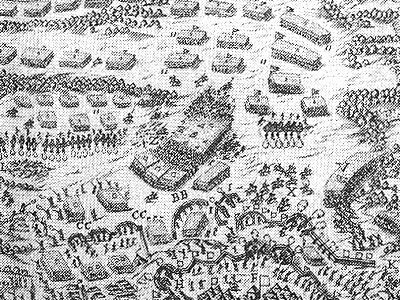
Contemporary drawing of battle formations and defenses for the Battle of Chocim, 1621

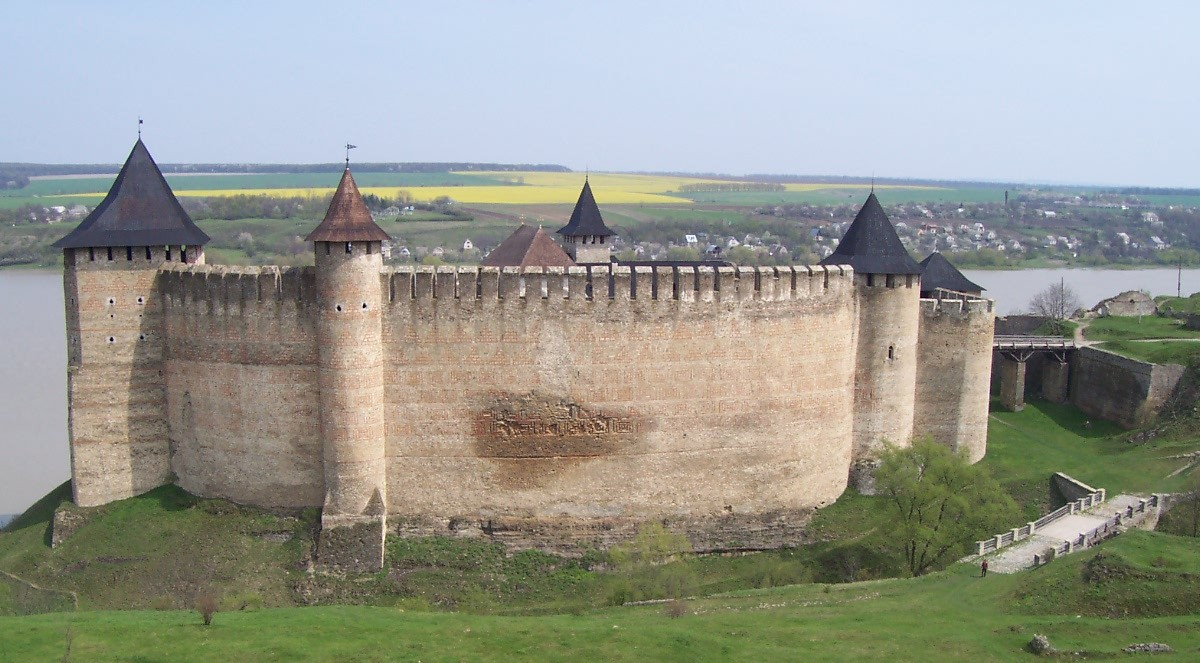
The inner Khotyn Fortress, the centerpoint of the defense. Most of the fighting took place in the outside parts, not shown on this image.

The Polish-Lithuanian army arrived near Khotyn around 24 August and started entrenching itself near the Khotyn Fortress, blocking the path of the Ottoman march. The army followed a common Commonwealth strategy when facing large Ottoman forces. It employed deep defences by building separate field works in front of the camp's defences. These fieldworks were designed to allow the use of cavalry counterattacks. Cavalry counterattacks were especially crucial because the Commonwealth relied heavily on its elite hussars and cossacks. A semicircle of field fortifications was created. The fortress was behind the fortifications and the Dniester River bordered the fortifications. The circle was divided into three sections: right, commanded by Hetman Chodkiewicz; central, commanded by Prince Władysław; and left, under Regimentarz Lubomirski. In addition, two fortified camps were set in front of the main defence line: the Cossacks' and the mercenaries' (the famous Lisowczycy unit).

==== Ottoman and Cossack skirmishes ====
On 27 August, a Cossack cavalry detachment carried out a suicidal raid, delaying the approaching Ottoman forces. It also inflicted casualties amounting to several times the number of attacking Cossacks, but the attackers were nearly annihilated. On 31 August, Ottoman cavalry, in turn, struck at the Cossack forces outside the camp. The Ottomans tried to scatter the Cossacks and cut them off from the main Polish-Lithuanian forces, but did not succeed. By 2 September, the main Ottoman army had arrived, and the siege began the day after the Cossacks joined the Polish camp.

=== Siege ===
==== Ottoman attacks ====
On 2 September the Ottomans tried to breach the unfinished Cossack camp. The Cossacks had received reinforcements from the Polish-Lithuanian army and held their positions. On 3 September, another Ottoman assault was directed at Lubomirski's flank of the main fortifications. This attack was stopped. In the afternoon the big Ottoman forces attacked the Cossack camp. This attack started a very fierce fight. The Ottomans were repulsed. The Cossacks rushed up behind the Ottomans into the Ottoman camp and returned at dusk with rich loot. The next day, 4 September, the Ottomans again tried to overrun the Cossacks camp but failed again. A Commonwealth counterattack managed to destroy several Ottoman guns in their positions. The experienced Commonwealth forces were able to withstand the Ottoman assaults because the Ottoman forces contained too many cavalrymen and too many inexperienced artillerymen to be efficient.

On 7 September, Ottoman troops assaulted the Cossack camp four times but were repulsed. At noon, the Ottoman soldiers stormed the Commonwealth camp, which had not been attacked so far. Janissaries exploited the Poles' lack of vigilance, as they were sleeping, attacking on the right flank of the Commonwealth Army and storming into the Polish entrenchments, cutting down about a hundred infantrymen. The janissaries were repulsed, but a new assault was expected. On 8 September, Ottoman Janissaries and Tatar troops attacked a Cossack convoy. Cossacks allowed the enemy to approach their convoy, once the enemy got into the position favorable to Cossacks, they opened fire from muskets on the approaching Ottoman Janissaries and Tatar troops. The Ottomans and Tatars were forced to retreat after suffering heavy losses, around 3,000 Janissaries died as a result of failed attack.

==== Commonwealth counterattack ====
Around 10,000 Ottomans moved to attack, but then Chodkiewicz personally led a counterattack with three hussar squadrons and one reiter squadron, a total of between 600 and 650 men. The Sipahi could not withstand the charge and they retreated chaotically. Chodkiewicz with his cavalry pursued them to the camp. Ottomans losses amounted to more than 500 killed and Commonwealth losses amounted to 30 killed. The charge inflicted heavy casualties and had a huge impact on the morale of the Ottoman army.

On 10 September, Chodkiewicz proposed a night attack. An assault was prepared for the night of 12 to 13 September, but just before the attack, there was heavy rainfall and the action had to be cancelled. The Cossacks then beheaded Borodavka in retribution.

==== Continued Ottoman attacks ====
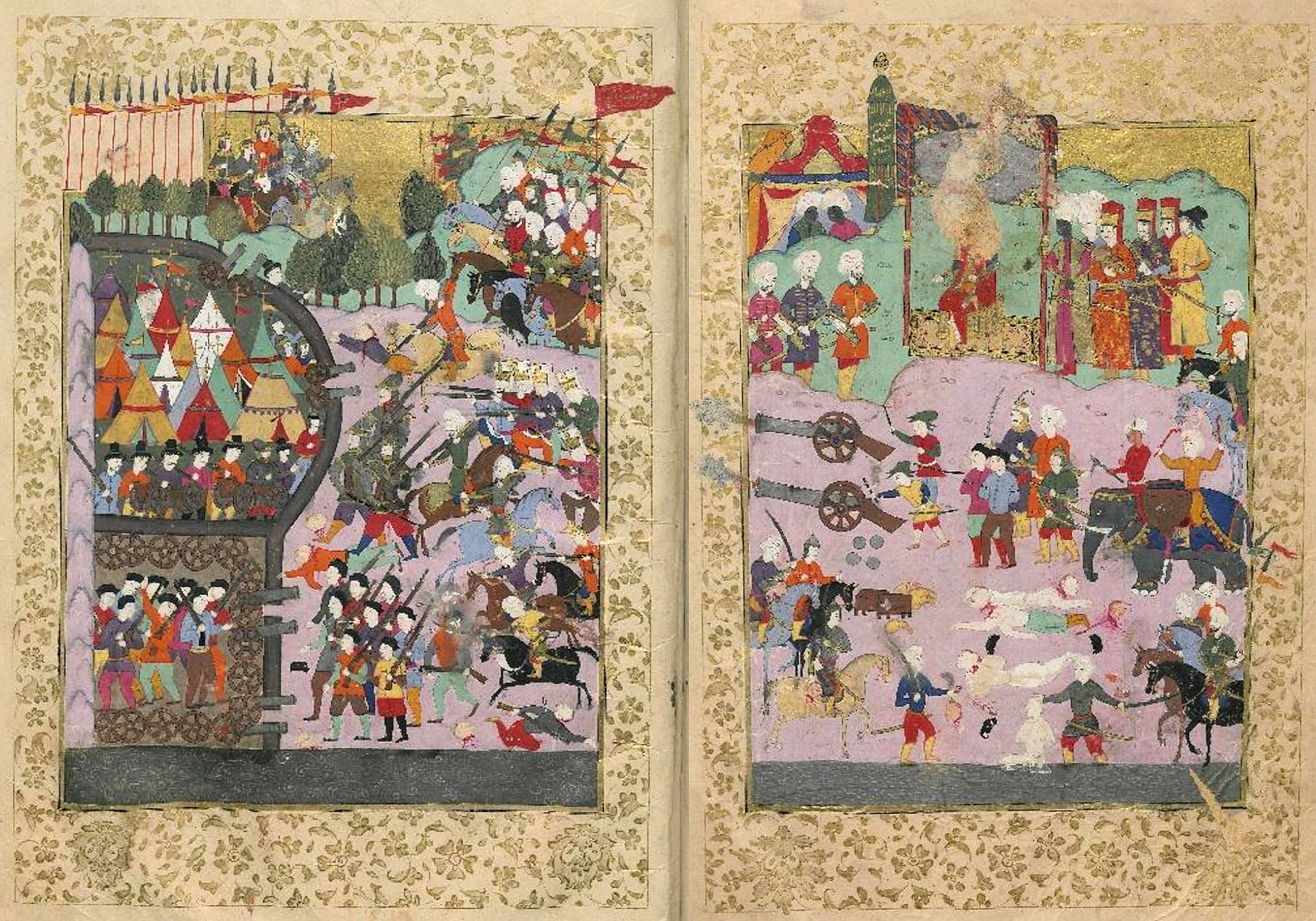
Ottoman-Polish battle during the Khotyn campaign (Şehnāme-i Nādirī, TPML, H. 1124, 67b-68a).

After several costly and unsuccessful assaults in the first week of the siege, the Ottomans tried to take the fortress by cutting off their supply and reinforcements and waiting for them to succumb to hunger and disease. A temporary bridge was raised by 14 September over the Dniester River that allowed the Ottomans to stop the Commonwealth fortress from using the river to communicate with another fortress at nearby Kamianets-Podilskyi. It also allowed the Ottomans to shift some of their cannons to the other bank of the river and shell Commonwealth forces from the rear. Another Ottoman assault on 15 September was again repulsed.

==== Cossack raid ====
On 18 September, at night, Cossacks stormed into the Ottoman camp on the Dniester. The attack was successful and the Ottomans suffered heavy losses. A similar attack took place on the night of 21 to 22 September. This time the objective was the lodging of Ohrili Hüseyin Pasha who was almost taken prisoner. Such actions raised the morale of the Commonwealth troops.

==== Ending supplies ====
Although the defenders were weakened, the Ottomans failed to break their morale. Also, while the defenders were running low on food and supplies, the Ottomans had similar problems. On 24 September, a few days before the siege was to be lifted, the aged Grand Hetman died of exhaustion and illness in the camp. Chodkiewicz's second-in-command, Regimentarz Stanisław Lubomirski, took command of the Polish forces on 23 September, when the ailing hetman passed the command to him. On 25 September Lubomirski ordered his weakened forces to pull back and man a smaller, shorter defensive line; the Ottomans tried another assault hoping for the defenders to be disorganized, but again, the assault failed. A final assault was stopped on 28 September.

The lateness of the season, the loss of 40,000–80,000 of his men in battle, the general exhaustion of the Ottoman army, the fact that his large force was also running out of supplies, and reportedly because of his illness compelled Osman II to accept a request from the defenders to start negotiations, even though the Polish-Lithuanian forces were almost out of supplies (a legend has it that by the end of the siege, the Commonwealth army was down to its last barrel of gunpowder).

== Aftermath ==
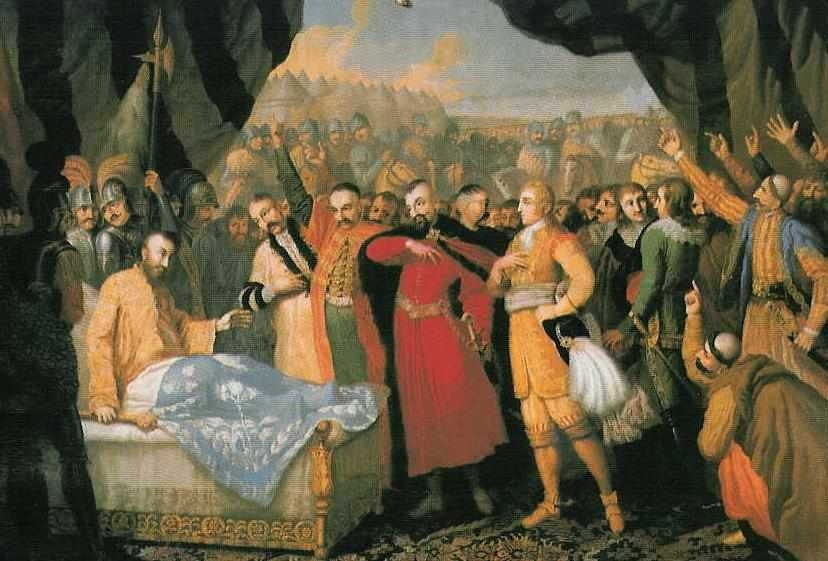
The Death of Chodkiewicz, Franciszek Smuglewicz, 1806

A peace treaty, the Treaty of Khotyn, was signed on 9 October. In some clauses, it favoured the Commonwealth, but the Ottoman Empire also got what it wanted. There were no territorial changes; the Commonwealth-Ottoman border was confirmed to be the Dniester River and the Commonwealth recognized Ottoman control over Moldavia. In the Commonwealth, and among the Cossacks, the stopping of the huge Ottoman army was seen as a great victory.

Sultan Osman himself was not satisfied with the battle's outcome and put the blame for it on the janissaries. Osman wanted to modernize the army, which he blamed for the defeat; his plans for modernization were, however, opposed by the tradition-minded janissaries. That opposition resulted in the rebellion of janissaries in 1622, in which Osman II was deposed and killed.

Having already lost Grand Hetman Chodkiewicz during the battle, the Commonwealth soon lost another of its most notable military figures of the early 17th century in Hetman of Registered Cossacks Petro Konashevych-Sahaidachny, who couldn't recover from battle injuries and died several months later.

== Result ==
A lot of sources consider this battle to be a Polish–Lithuanian–Cossack victory. However, others describe it a stalemate.

== Cultural impact ==
The Battle of Khotyn was the largest battle in the history of the Polish Commonwealth to date, and it was proclaimed as a great victory over the 'heathens'. Among the accounts of the battle is a rather one-sided one from Wacław Potocki's Transakcja wojny chocimskiej (The Progress of the War of Chocim), written during the period 1669–1672. It was based on the less-known Commentariorum Chotinensis belli libri tres ("Commentary on the Chocim War in three volumes") (diary, published in 1646) by Jakub Sobieski and other sources, now lost.

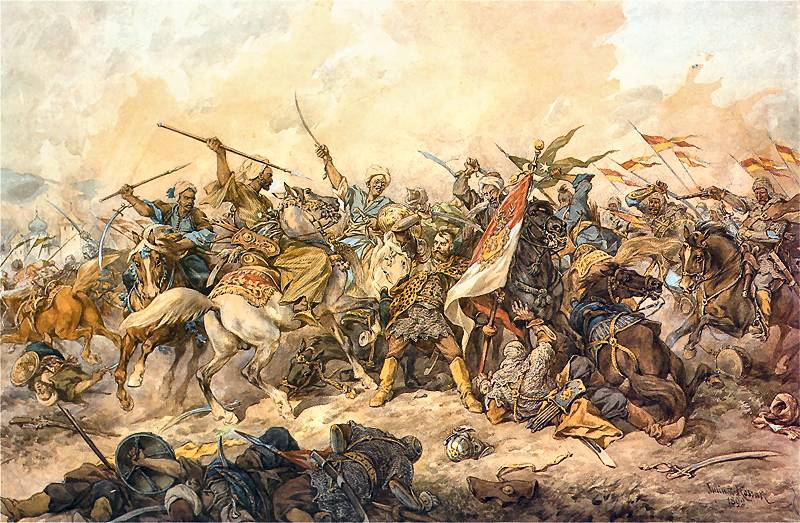
Defending the Polish Banner at Khotyn, Juliusz Kossak, 1892

On the Ottoman side, young Sultan Osman II declared publicly that the result of this battle was an Ottoman victory over the 'giaour'. When he returned to Constantinople on 27 December 1621, he entered with a victory procession; there were three days and nights of victory celebrations. However, the young Sultan was personally very unsatisfied with the result of the battle and the behavior of his household troops, the janissaries, during the campaign and started taking measures to reform the Ottoman military. That attempt led to a revolt in Constantinople by the army, madrasa (religious school) students and wealthy merchants in May 1622, at the end of which Sultan Osman II was deposed and killed by the leaders of the mob. This revolt and the demise of the young Sultan (who was only 17 when killed) is one of the events most written about by Ottoman historians and appears often in Ottoman court literature and Ottoman popular literature. In the peoples' coffee houses in Istanbul (up to the end of the 19th century) public storytellers used to relate the tales, many in poetry form, of the exploits of Young Osman (including Khotin) and his tragic demise.

The Battle of Khotyn is commemorated on the Tomb of the Unknown Soldier, Warsaw, with the inscription "CHOCIM 2 IX - 9 X 1621/10 - 11 XI 1673".
