= Asu (given name) =

Asu is a Turkish feminine given name that means "naughty child", also shortened version of Asuman and Asude.

== Given name ==
- Asu Maralman, Turkish singer and actress
- Asu Sena Kurtyilmaz, Turkish actress
- Asu Emre, Turkish actress

== Fictional Character ==
- Asu, fictional character in Kara Sevda
- Asu, fictional character in Fatmagül'ün Suçu Ne?
