= Battle of Cecora (1620) =

Part of the Polish-Ottoman War of 1620–21

- Part of the Moldavian Magnate Wars and the Polish–Ottoman War (1620–1621)
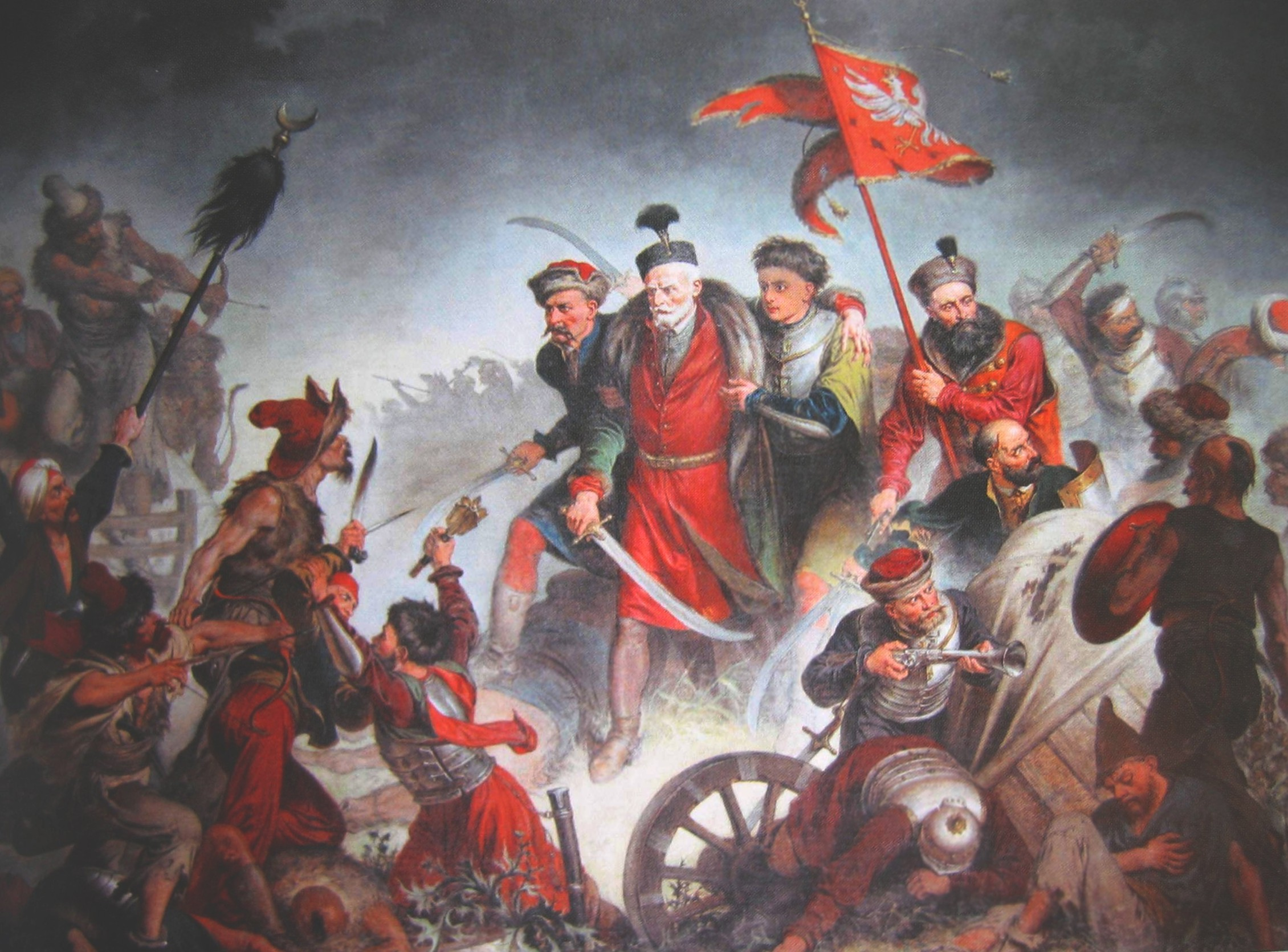
- Death of Hetman Stanislaw Żółkiewski with his confessor, Father Szymon Wybierski, in the Battle of Cecora (1620), painting by Walery Eljasz-Radzikowski
Date	17 September – 7 October 1620
Location	Near Țuțora and the Prut River, Moldavia
Result	Ottoman victory

Belligerents
Polish–Lithuanian Commonwealth; Moldavia	Ottoman Empire; Crimean Khanate; Transylvania

Commanders and leaders
(Polish–Lithuanian Commonwealth) Stanisław Żółkiewski † (Polish–Lithuanian Commonwealth) Stanisław Koniecpolski (POW) (Moldavia) Gaspar Graziani (Moldavia) Vasile Septilici	(Ottoman Empire) Iskender Pasha; Khan Temir (Transylvania) Gabor Bethlen

Strength
9,000 Commonwealth troops 600–1,000 Moldavian troops	20,000 Ottoman troops to 60,000

Casualties and losses
2,000 to 3,000 killed, wounded, or deserted or only 1,000–1,500 survived	1,500 killed or wounded

The Battle of Cecora (also known as the Battle of Țuțora) took place during the Polish–Ottoman War (1620–21) between the Polish–Lithuanian Commonwealth (aided by rebel Moldavian troops) and Ottoman forces (backed by Nogais), fought from 17 September to 7 October 1620 in Moldavia, near the Prut River.

== Prelude ==
Because of the failure of the Commonwealth diplomatic mission to Constantinople, and violations of the Treaty of Busza by both sides (as Cossacks and Tatars continued their raids across the borders), relations between the Ottomans and the Commonwealth rapidly deteriorated in early 1620. Both sides began preparing for war, although neither was quite ready for it at the time. The Ottomans declared war against Poland in 1620 and planned to attack in the spring of 1621. The Commonwealth Sejm denied most funds the hetmans had asked for. The Senate's secret council finally decided, convinced by the Habsburgs' representative, to contribute the Commonwealth forces in 1620—even though many members of the Sejm thought that Polish–Lithuanian forces were neither sufficient nor fully prepared. Hetman Stanisław Żółkiewski, who was by then over 70 years old (as Commonwealth policy didn't allow for a possibility of forced retirement from government offices such as that of hetman), foresaw the coming confrontation with the Ottoman Empire and decided to meet Ottoman troops on foreign soil, Moldavia being the obvious choice. However, the sultan sent Iskender Pasha to Moldavia to remove Hospodar Gaspar Graziani, who had allied himself with Poland.

Hetmans Zółkiewski and Koniecpolski led the army to Țuțora (Cecora in Polish sources), a commune in Iași County, Romania, to fight the Horde of Khan Temir (Kantymir). The army numbered between 5,000 to 9,000 (2,000 infantry but only about 1600 Cossack cavalry), with many regiments being made up of the private forces of magnates Koreckis, Zasławskis, Kazanowskis, Kalinowskis, and Potockis. The army entered Moldavia in September. The Moldavian ruler, hospodar Gaspar Graziani, nominally a vassal of the Ottoman Empire, decided to rebel and support the Commonwealth against the Ottomans. Graziani killed the janissaries in Iași, imprisoned envoys of Sultan Osman II (who had ordered his removal from power and his transport to Istanbul) and then prepared to flee, but was forced by Żółkiewski to attach his troops to the Polish–Lithuanian camp. However, many of the Moldavian boyars left the camp in order to defend their own estates against pillaging by undisciplined Commonwealth magnates' troops, others decided to wait and see what the outcome appeared to be so they could join the winning side, and others joined the Turks. Consequently, only about 600–1000 rebel Moldavian troops appeared in the Commonwealth camp. Żółkiewski ordered the army to proceed to the fortified camp (standing from previous wars) at Cecora.

== Battle ==
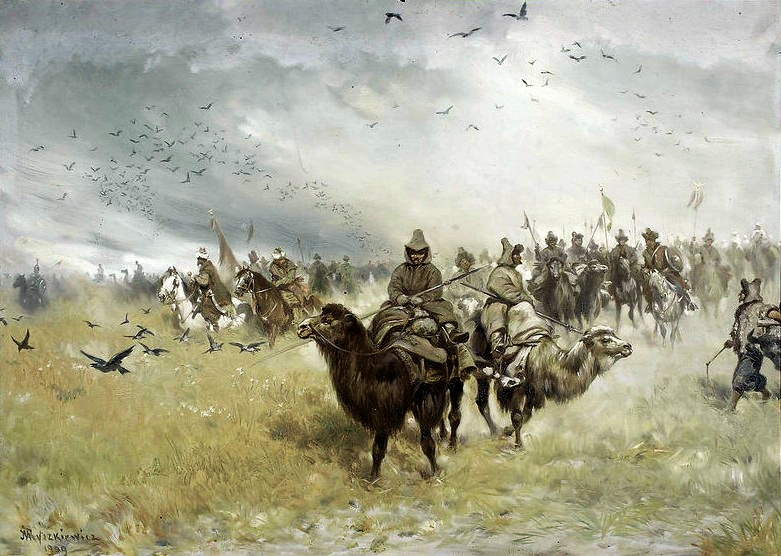
Tatar warriors of the Crimean Khanate during the Battle of Cecora (1620)

On 10 September, near Țuțora (close to Iași, Romania), the Commonwealth army encountered the Tatar and Ottoman forces, 13,000–22,000 strong, under the command of Iskender Pasha, the beylerbey of Ochakiv (Ozi). The Ottoman sultan's force included Gabriel Bethlen's Transylvanian army. The Tatar forces surprised the Commonwealth defenders, taking many prisoners. On the 17th, during the first day of fighting, most of the rebel Moldavians decided to switch sides and quickly attacked the Polish–Lithuanian flank. Mercenaries, private troops and their magnate leaders were lacking in discipline and morale. Stanisław Koniecpolski commanded the right flank of the Commonwealth forces during the ensuing battle. On 19 September it had become clear that the Polish–Lithuanian forces were defeated, although they still managed to hold their positions; on 20/21 September, Koniecpolski prevented the army from disintegrating. On 29 September, Commonwealth troops had broken through Ottoman ranks with tabor wagon trains and started their retreat. However, after Graziani bribed some magnates, units of private troops began to flee and some mercenary cavalry panicked and also ran. This was a prelude of things to come. Consecutive attacks during the retreat (including a particularly violent one on 3 October) were repelled, but troop units started disintegrating.

During another heavy assault on 6 October, most of the magnates and nobles broke and fled north, leaving infantry and camp, thus sealing the fate of the whole expedition: most of the Polish–Lithuanian troops were killed or captured. The ensuing battle saw the death of Żólkiewski, Koniecpolski, and many others including Samuel Korecki, Mikolaj Struś, Mikołaj Potocki, Jan Żółkiewski, Łukasz Żołkiewski, while Stanisław "Rewera" Potocki and Bohdan Khmelnytsky were taken captive. Before his death, Żółkiewski received the blessing of his confessor, Father Szymon Wybierski (Wybierek) of the Society of Jesus, who stood by his side (7 October). Żółkiewski's head was mounted on a pike and sent to the sultan; Duke Korecki, having often meddled in Moldavian territories, was executed in prison in Constantinople.

In the face of such an important victory, advised by grand vizier Ali Pasha and Gabriel Bethlen, Osman II decided that he could reinforce his rule or even extend it. Alexandru Iliaș was appointed as the ruler of Moldavia, the rebel Graziani having been killed during his flight on 29 September.

== Aftermath ==
Between 1,000 and 1,500 Commonwealth men survived the battles, while the Tatars moved into Podolia, Wołyń and eastern Lesser Poland.

In 1621 an army of 200,000–250,000 Ottoman veterans, led by Osman II, advanced from Edirne towards the Polish frontier. The Ottomans, following their victory in the Battle of Cecora, had high hopes of conquering the southern part of the Polish–Lithuanian Commonwealth. Polish commander Jan Karol Chodkiewicz crossed the Dniester in September with approximately 35,000 Polish troops and Cossack supporters and entrenched himself at the Chocim (Khotyn) Fortress, blocking the path of the slow Ottoman march. During the Battle of Khotyn, for more than a month (2 September – 9 October 1621), the Commonwealth hetman held the sultan at bay until the first autumn snow. The lateness of the season and the loss of approximately 40,000 men in battle compelled Osman II to initiate negotiations. A few days before the siege was to be lifted, on 24 September, the aged grand hetman died of exhaustion in the fortress. The battle was a stalemate and the resulting Treaty of Khotyn reflected it, providing some concessions to the Commonwealth but meeting some Ottoman demands.

Osman II blamed the stalemate of war on the lack of zeal and the "degeneracy" of the Janissaries. His efforts at modernizing the Ottoman army were not well received by the Janissaries and the conservative "learned" class. A revolt led by Janissaries and the students of the madrases erupted on 18 May 1622 and Osman II was deposed, and two days later he was killed by the rebels.

== Commemoration ==
The Battle of Cecora is commemorated on the Tomb of the Unknown Soldier, Warsaw, with the inscription "CECORA 18 – 29 IX 1620".

== See also ==
- Magnate wars in Moldavia
