= Battle of Cecora =

Battle of Cecora may refer to:

- Battle of Cecora (1595)
- Battle of Cecora (1620)
