= Peace of Busza =

1617 treaty between Poland-Lithuania and the Ottoman Empire

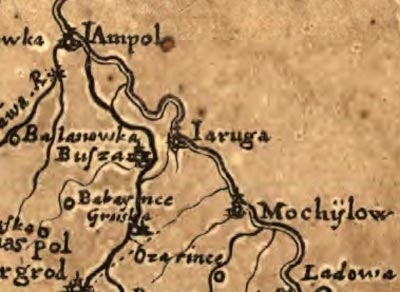
Busza on Beauplan's map from 1648. Note that south is up on this map.

The Peace of Busza (Busha, Bose) also known as the Treaty of Jaruga was negotiated by Stanisław Żółkiewski of the Polish–Lithuanian Commonwealth and Iskender Pasha of the Ottoman Empire in Busza (Busha or Bose) near the Yaruha and Dniester rivers on 23 September 1617. Polish and Ottoman armies met, but decided to negotiate, instead of to fight. In this peace treaty Polish–Lithuanian Commonwealth agreed to cede the Khotyn to the Ottomans and to stop its interference in Moldavia.

That 1617 treaty stated that Poland would not interfere in the internal affairs of Ottoman vassals in Transylvania, Moldavia and Wallachia, the Commonwealth was to prevent Cossacks from raiding lands in the Ottoman Empire, while ceding Khotyn. In return, the Ottoman Empire promised to stop Tatar raids. The Ottoman Empire also had the right to interfere in Transylvania, Moldavia and Wallachia and select the rulers of that region.

The treaty would be violated by both sides, as Cossacks and Tatars would continue to raid the borderlands. This would lead to a new war, but the status quo of the peace of Busza would be confirmed in the aftermath of the Polish-Ottoman War (1620–1621) by the Treaty of Khotyn.
