= Kaşgarli Mahmut Prize =

One-time literary prize

The Kaşgarli Mahmut Prize was a one-time literary prize awarded in 2008 to authors in the Turkic languages area of Turkey and Central Asia as a UNESCO project on the 1000th anniversary of Mahmud al-Kashgari.

- 1st Prize Asuman Güzelce
- 2nd Prize Orhan Seyfi Şirin
- 3rd Prize Mehmet Uyar
- Honorable Mention Kamil Uğurlu

A large number of books were submitted to the competition, including 415 titles from Turkey alone.
