= Asuman =

Asuman is a Turkish feminine given name. Notable people with this name include:

- Asuman Aksoy, Turkish-American mathematician
- Asuman Baytop (1920–2015), Turkish botanist
- Asuman Dabak (born 1970), Turkish actor
- Asuman Güzelce (born 1969), Turkish writer and art teacher
- Asuman Karakoyun (born 1990), Turkish volleyball player
- Asuman Kiyingi (male, born 1963), Ugandan lawyer and politician
- Asuman Krause (born 1976), German-Turkish model, singer, tv host, and beauty contestant
- Asuman Özdağlar (born 1974), Turkish electrical engineering academic
- Asuman Şakı (born 1988), Turkish tennis player
