= Treaty of Khotyn =

1621 treaty between Poland-Lithuania and the Ottoman Empire

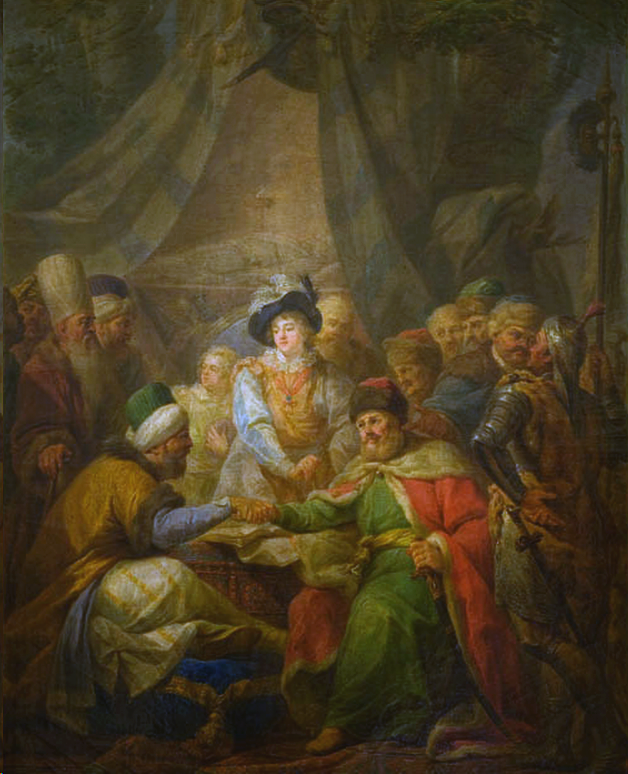
Treaty of Khotyn by Marcello Bacciarelli

Treaty of Khotyn (Chocim/Hotin), signed on 9 October 1621 in the aftermath of the Battle of Khotyn, ended the Polish–Ottoman War. With this peace treaty, the Khotyn fortress was given to Moldavia as an Ottoman vassal and the Polish–Lithuanian Commonwealth agreed to stop its interference in Moldavia. Both sides claimed victory, as the Commonwealth saw the battle of Khotyn as successfully stopping the Ottoman Empire's invasion of its mainland.

The Treaty was rather favorable to the Commonwealth, but the Ottoman Emperor also gained what it wanted. There were no territorial changes; the Commonwealth-Ottoman border was confirmed to be the Dniester river, and the Commonwealth recognized Ottoman control over Moldavia. In the Commonwealth, and among the Ukrainian Cossacks, stopping of the huge Ottoman army was seen as a great victory.

The treaty for the most part repeated the earlier agreement – Treaty of Busza (also known as Treaty of Jaruga) (1617), negotiated by Stanisław Żółkiewski and Iskender Pasha. That 1617 treaty stated that Poland would not meddle in the internal affairs of Ottoman vassals in Transylvania, Moldavia and Wallachia, the Commonwealth was to prevent Cossacks from raiding lands in the Ottoman Empire, while ceding Khotyn. In return, the Ottoman Empire promised to stop Tatar raids.

The Ottomans, on the other hand, even though they gained Commonwealth recognition of their control over Moldavia, were in much worse shape internally. Notably, Chodkiewicz wasn't the only one to die as a result of that battle: Sultan Osman himself paid the highest price for the failure of his plans. The Khotyn outcome, and the Ottoman failure to crush the outnumbered Commonwealth army, led Osman to put the blame on the janissaries. Osman wanted to modernize the army, which he blamed for the defeat; his plans for modernization were, however, opposed by the traditional-minded janissaries, culminating in the rebellion of janissaries in 1622, in which Osman II was assassinated.

The Commonwealth-Ottoman border would be fairly quiet until the Polish-Ottoman War (1633-1634).
