= Gaspar Graziani =

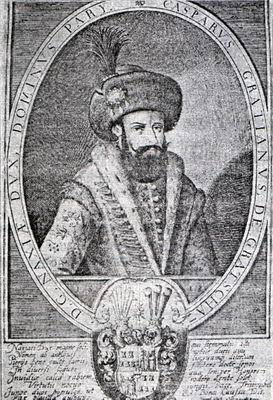

Prince of Moldavia
- Reign: February 1619 – September 1620
- Predecessor: Radu Mihnea
- Successor: Alexandru VII Iliaș
- Born: c. 1575/1580
- Died: 29 September 1620 (aged around 40–45); Țuțora
- Religion: Orthodox

Gaspar (or Gașpar, Gasparo) Graziani (also credited as Grazziani, Gratiani and Grațiani; 1575/1580 – 29 September 1620) was Voivode (Prince) of Moldavia between February 4OS/February 14 NS 1619 and September 19 OS/September 29 NS 1620 (see Adoption of the Gregorian calendar).

== Early life ==
Gaspar Graziani de Candia is of Venetian Italian or Croatian origin and is assumed that he originate from Bihać area. The byname "Croatian" used along with his Christian name and surname, Croat Gašpar Graziani Kandija, appears in European and Ottoman sources.

A polyglot born in Dalmatia, Graziani had been in the service of several European powers: he was an interpreter for the English diplomatic mission in the Ottoman Empire, and then an envoy of both the Grand Duke of Tuscany Cosimo II and the Spanish Viceroy of Naples to the Porte, negotiating the release of Christian sailors captured by Barbary pirates.

The sultan awarded Graziani the title of Duke of Paros and Naxos in 1616; he became a close ally of the Doges and, like his predecessor and rival Radu Mihnea, a self-declared admirer of the Serenissime system of government; Graziani also married into a family of Venetian patricians.

== In Moldavia ==
Appointed Dragoman, he was charged by the Turks with missions in the Holy Roman Empire, and nevertheless acted as a spy in favour of the Habsburgs. These activities, along with bribery and promises of absolute loyalty to the Porte, gathered Graziani the support he needed in his bid for the Moldavian throne. In order to qualify for the customary requirements, he quickly converted from Roman Catholicism to Eastern Orthodoxy and accepted the sacraments. On his way to Moldavia, he was received in Adrianople by a delegation of 20 boyars, and is said to have been acclaimed by thousands upon his arrival on the shores of the Danube.

He organized an armed guard of 500 for his personal defence, and defied the Ottomans by starting negotiations for an alliance with Poland's King Sigismund III Vasa. The Sultan ordered him removed and a kapucu was sent for this purpose; Graziani had the envoy and his 300-strong retinue massacred. He managed to contribute with a minuscule number of his troops to hetman Stanisław Koniecpolski's effort and was present at the Battle of Cecora, but, as he was making his way to refuge in Poland, he was murdered in the village of Braniște (nowadays in Rîșcani, Republic of Moldova) by two of his boyars, Șeptilici and Goia, who were fearful of Ottoman reprisals.

His life was the subject of Ioan Slavici's 1888 tragedy, Gaspar Gratiani.

== See also ==
- Moldavian Magnate Wars

Preceded by Radu Mihnea	Prince/Voivode of Moldavia; 1619–1620	Succeeded by Alexandru Iliaș
