= Güzelce Dam =

- Location within Turkey
- Interactive map of Güzelce Dam
- Location: Turkey
- Coordinates: 40°06′14″N 36°33′58″E
- Construction began: 1995

Güzelce Dam is a dam in Tokat Province, Turkey, which began construction in 1995. The development was backed by the Turkish State Hydraulic Works.

== See also ==
- List of dams and reservoirs in Turkey
