= Busha =

Village in Vinnytsia Oblast, Ukraine

Busha Буша
- Village
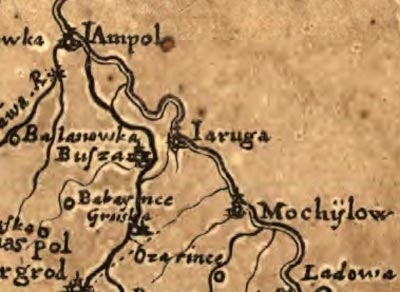
- Busha (marked as Buʃza) on Beauplan's map from 1648. South is up, north is down, the river represented by a double line is Dniester

- Location within Ukraine Location within Vinnytsia Oblast
- Coordinates: 48°20′24″N 28°7′12″E
- Country: Ukraine
- Oblast: Vinnytsia Oblast
- Raion: Mohyliv-Podilskyi Raion
- Hromada: Yampil urban hromada

Area
  - Total: 2.87 km^{2} (1.11 sq mi)

Population (2001 Census)
  - Total: 847
  - Density: 295.12/km^{2} (764.4/sq mi)
- Time zone: UTC+2 (EET)
  - Summer (DST): UTC+3 (EEST)
- Postal code: 24523
- Area code: +380 4336

Busha (Ukrainian: Буша) is a village situated in Podolia region in Ukraine, on the junction of the Murafa and Bushanka Rivers in Mohyliv-Podilskyi Raion in Vinnytsia Oblast, near the Moldovan border.

It got the status of a city in the early 17th century. In 1629 there were 2000 people living in this city.

== History ==
Busha is known in history because of the Peace of Busza that was signed in this village between the Polish-Lithuanian Commonwealth and the Ottoman Empire on September 23, 1617. During the mid-17th century, the city, situated in Bracław Voivodeship of the Polish-Lithuanian Commonwealth, was also the site of several battles between Poles and Ukrainian Cossacks.

=== Fortress ===
In the second half of the 17th century, a big fortress with 6 towers, belonging to an administrative and military unit of the Ukrainian Cossack state named Bratslav Regiment, was built in the centre of the village.

During the Cossack-Polish War (1648–1657) the castle was attacked several times by the Polish army. In 1654 the castle could not hold its ground anymore and was destroyed completely.

=== City's end ===
Despite being a strong defensive backing for Ukrainian Cossacks in the war, as in March 1654, for example, when an attack of 3,000 Polish soldiers was successfully staved off, in November of the same year the fortress was destroyed by an approximately 60,000-strong Polish army during the Russo-Polish war.

About 70 women fled from the fortress with their children and sheltered in another fortress nearby. The Poles refused to chase them because they already lost many of their soldiers as the fortress inhabitants never gave up and would rather die fighting than live in captivity. Seeing the hopelessness of the situation, the wife of local sotnyk Zavistny blew up the fortress along with everyone remaining inside.

After the destruction of the castle, the city soon lost its status and was degraded to a village.

== Social and cultural background ==
Historical settlements in the area around Busha date back to several ancient civilizations, including Cucuteni-Trypillian culture (from the 11th century BC), Scythia (4800–3000 BC), Chernyakhov culture (2nd – 5th century AD). From 400 – 800 AD, old East Slavic cultures arrived during the great Migration Period. In 1629, 2.000 people were living there.

The Podilla region in its entirety includes Ukrainians, Poles, Romanians and Armenians, as well as Germans. Besides Greek and Orthodox Catholics there is also a Jewish community which is, speaking about Ukraine in a whole, is the third biggest in Europe, according to the World Jewish Congress and have a long history in Podolia region according to JewishGen Ukraine SIG.

The cultural legacy of Busha consists of:

- 5th century pagan temple
- ruins of the castle including a town hall and an old tower
- an old cemetery of the 18th century
- four archeological sites dating from the times of the Trypilian culture, Bronze Age, Iron Age, and the Scythian period

It also includes a park with neo-pagan sculptures. The Ukrainian government created the Buszy park historical cultural in 2000.

Furthermore, there are special caves that can be found, near the village. Until the 20th century they were covered with sand. That is why they were discovered quite recently. Even the Dalai Lama came there once and described it as a special place where Earth is connected with God and the Universe.

Today the village has around 850 inhabitants. Rural tourism in the form of ecotourism has been noticeable developing over the last years.

=== Image Mapping project ===
In 2013, the regional NGOs Pangeya Ultima and Nashe Podilla organized the Image Mapping project in Busha with help of EVS volunteers. Its aim is to uncover beautiful and interesting monuments and places that are not very popular amongst tourists yet. This is tried to be done by highlighting these spots with specially produced picture frames providing information for the visitor, while showing him an unhindered view onto the object.

== Logistics ==
Every weekend on Saturday and Sunday a bus leaving Vinnytsia at 8:45am heads to the village of Busha. This timetable is only valid until November 19, 2017.

== In culture ==
In 1894 Ukrainian writer Mykhailo Starytsky published a short story describing the events of the 1654 Siege of Busha. Later it was reworked by the author into a drama.

== Photos of Busha ==
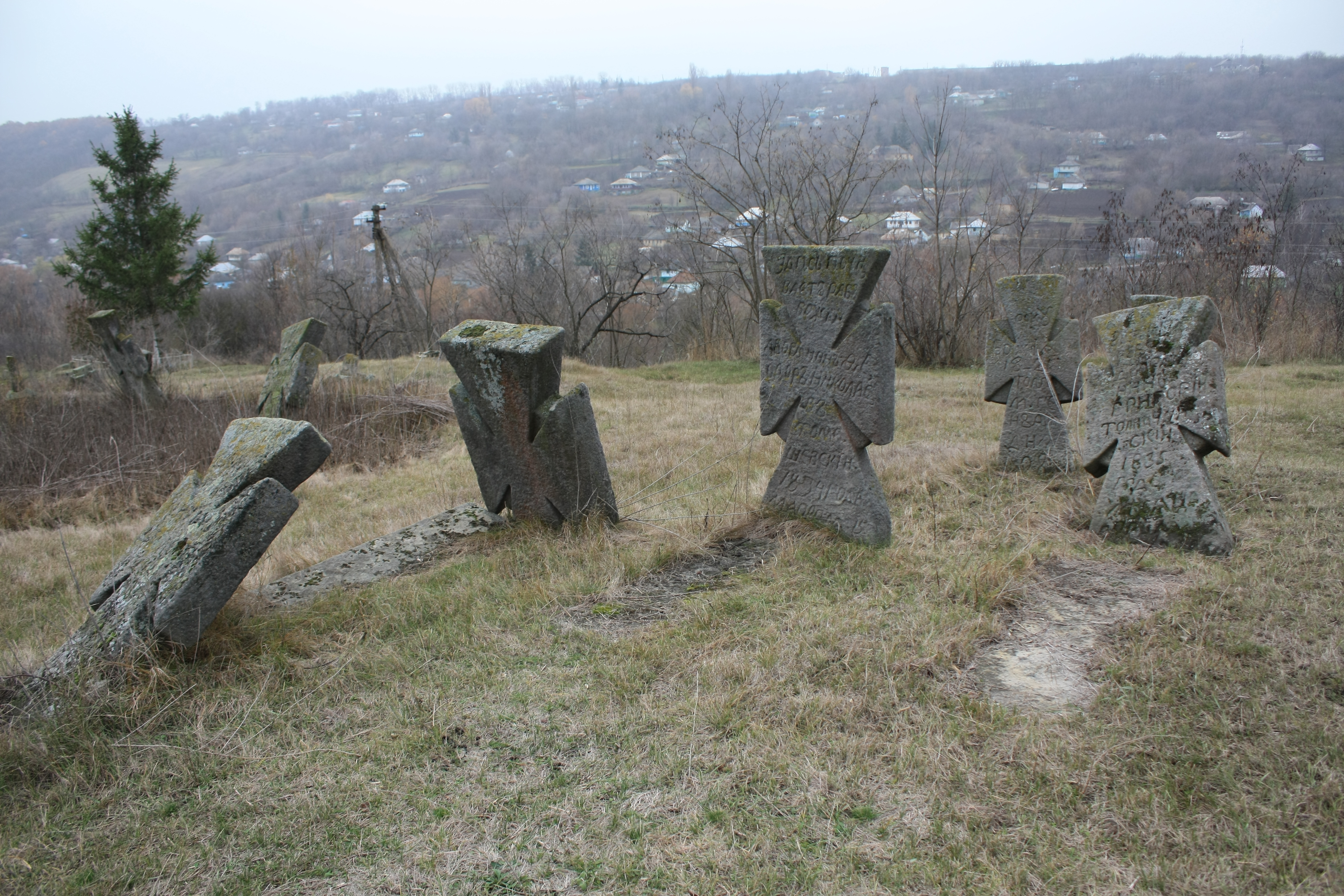
Cossack Cemetery in the forest

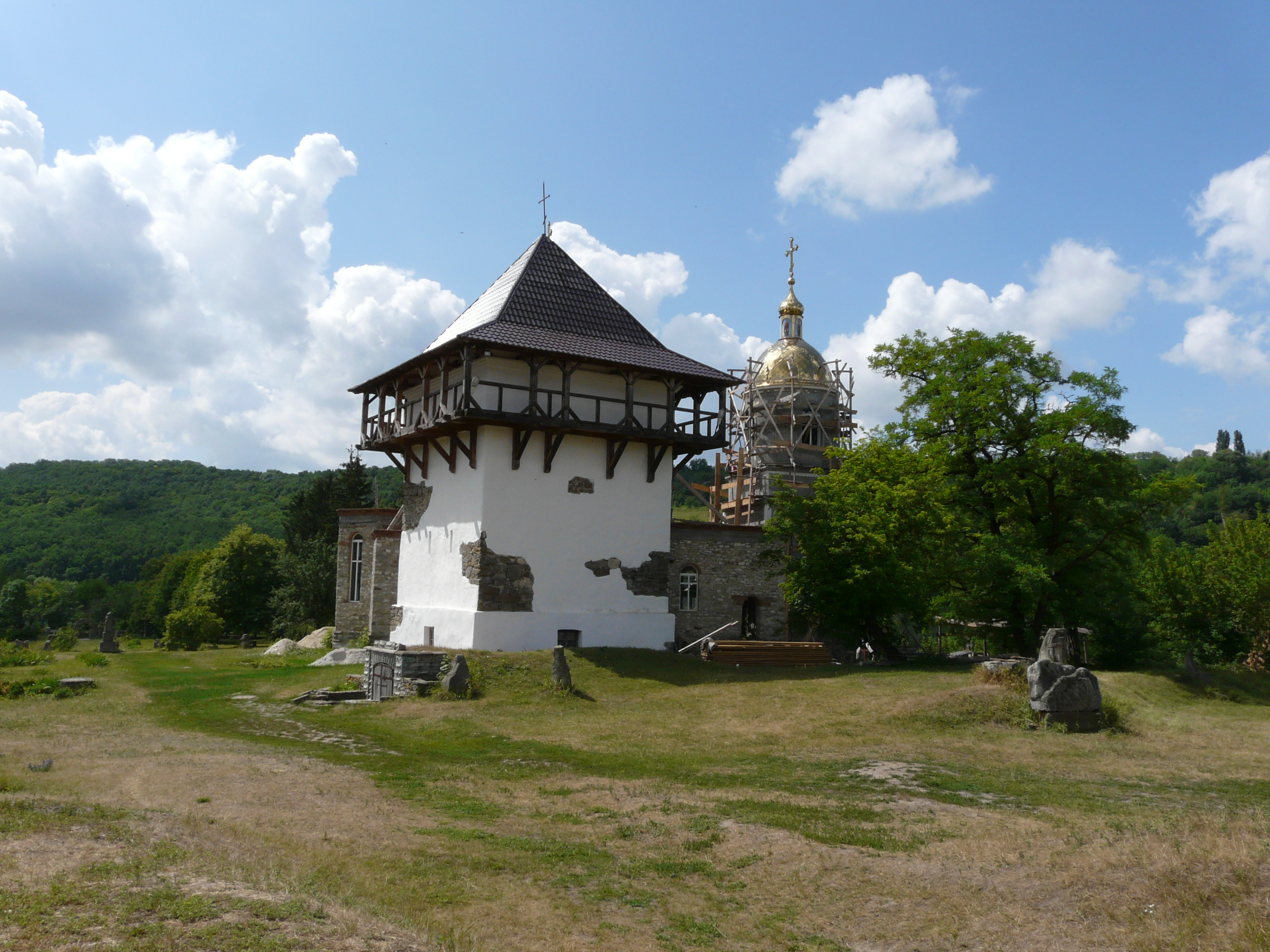
Busha Fort

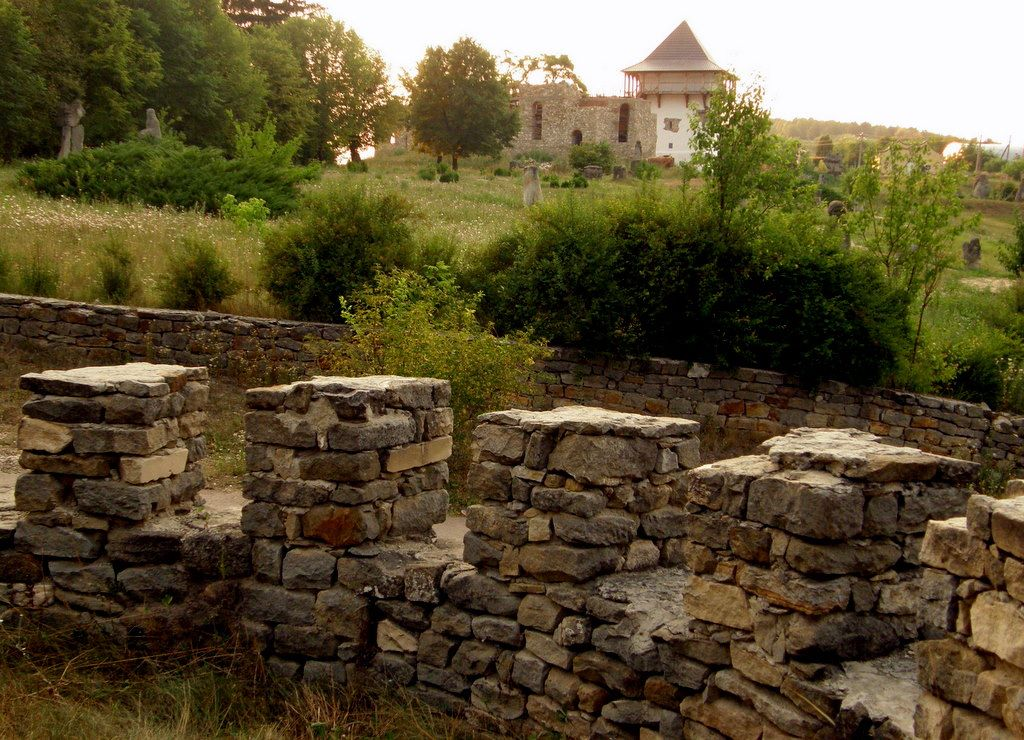
Ruins in Busha
