= Asude (name) =

Asude is a Turkish female given name that means vigorous and comfortable.

== People ==
- Asude Kalebek, Turkish actress
- Ece Asude Ediz (born 2002), Turkish boxer
- Asude Nilgün Özaykal, Turkish actress
