= Țuțora =

- Commune
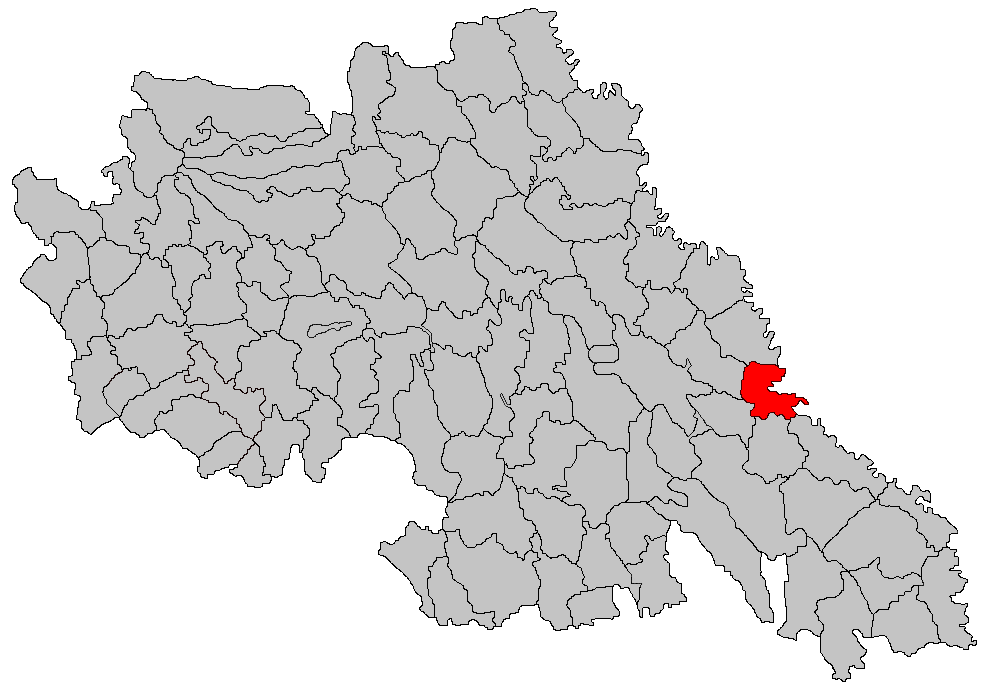
- Location in Iași County

- Location in Romania
- Coordinates: 47°8′N 27°47′E
- Country: Romania
- County: Iași

Government
  - Mayor (2020–2024): Cristinel Albu (PSD)
- Area: 38.07 km^{2} (14.70 sq mi)
- Elevation: 37 m (121 ft)
- Population (2021-12-01): 2,063
  - Density: 54/km^{2} (140/sq mi)
- Time zone: EET/EEST (UTC+2/+3)
- Postal code: 707560
- Area code: +(40) 232
- Vehicle reg.: IS
- Website: www.comunatutora.ro

Țuțora is a commune in Iași County, Western Moldavia, Romania. It is composed of three villages: Chiperești, Oprișeni, and Țuțora. In 2021, it had a population of 2,063. The Battle of Țuțora took place here in 1620.
