= Asuman Güzelce =

Turkish writer, art teacher and hattat (born 1969)

Asuman Güzelce (born Ladik, Samsun, 1 April 1969) is a Turkish writer, art teacher and hattat.

Her novel Sessiz göç was recipient of the 2008 Kaşgarli Mahmut Prize.

Her books include Sessiz Goc, Zamanin Yakama Yapistirdiklari and Elini Kalbime Koy.
