= Ohrili Hüseyin Pasha =

Grand Vizier of the Ottoman Empire (1621)

Ohrili Hüseyin Pasha (Albanian: Ohrili Hysein Pasha; died 20 May 1622) was an Ottoman nobleman, military figure and statesman. He was Grand Vizier of the Ottoman Empire in 1621. He was an ethnic Albanian from the city of Ohrid (today in North Macedonia). His father was a Timariot Sipahi and as a child he grew up in the Bostancı neighbourhood. In 1617 he participated in the Ottoman-Safavid War (1616-1618) and became appointed as a Janissary commander.

== See also ==
- List of Ottoman grand viziers

Political offices
Preceded by Güzelce Ali Pasha	Grand Vizier of the Ottoman Empire; 9 March 1621 – 17 September 1621	Succeeded by Dilaver Pasha
