= Güzelce Ali Pasha =

Ottoman statesman (died 1621)

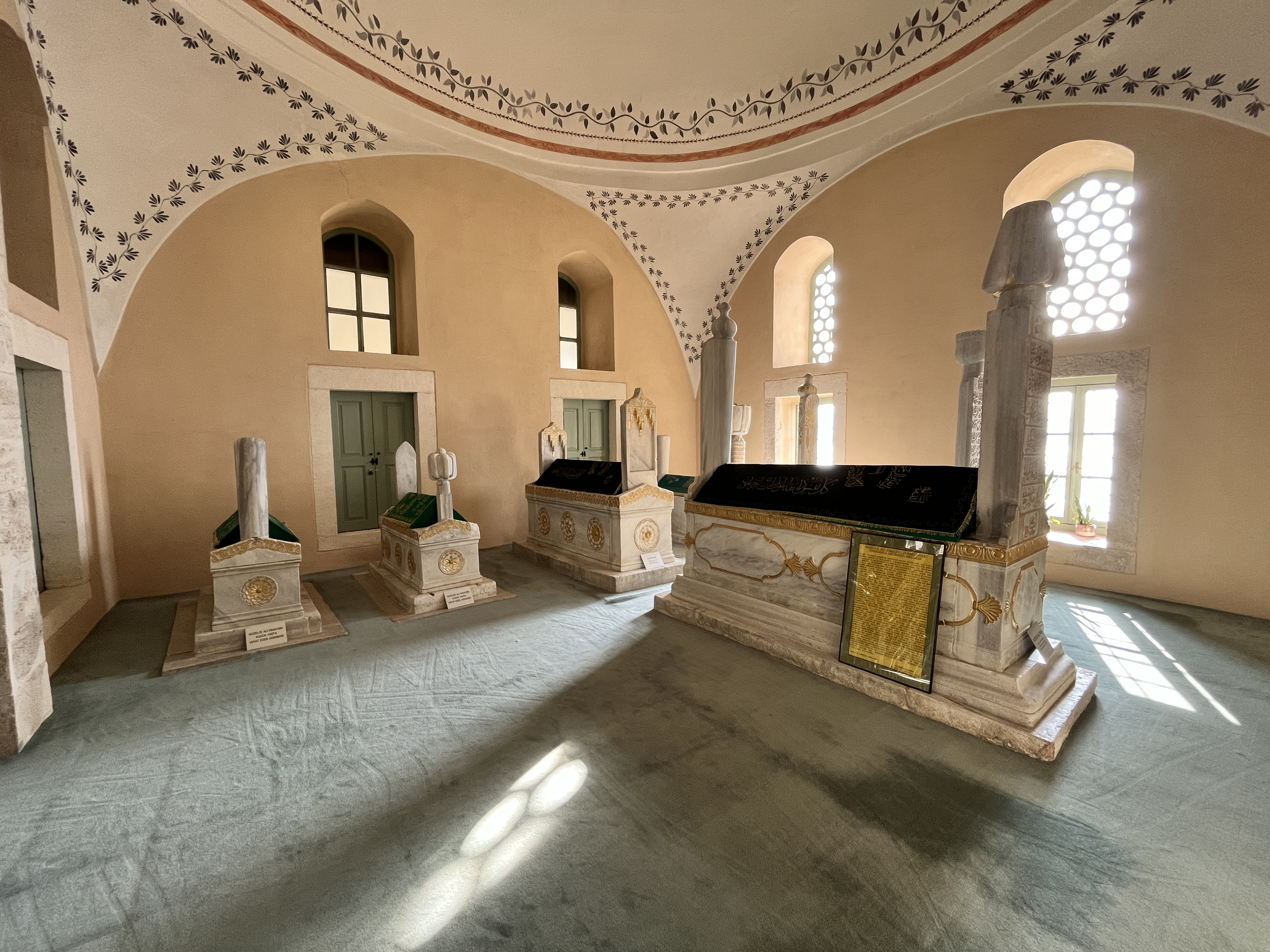
- Tomb of Güzelce Ali Pasha

Grand Vizier of the Ottoman Empire
- In office 23 December 1619 – 9 March 1621
- Monarch: Osman II
- Preceded by: Öküz Mehmed Pasha
- Succeeded by: Ohrili Hüseyin Pasha

Personal details
- Born: 1581 Istanköy, Ottoman Empire (modern-day Kos, Greece)
- Died: 9 March 1621 (aged 39–40) Constantinople, Ottoman Empire (modern-day Istanbul, Turkey)
- Spouse: Fatma Sultan (m. 1616)

Güzelce Ali Pasha (Ali Pasha the Handsome; died 9 March 1621), also known as Çelebi Ali Pasha or İstanköylü Ali Pasha, was an Ottoman statesman and military figure. He was Kapudan Pasha (grand admiral of the Ottoman Navy) around 1617 and Grand Vizier of the Ottoman Empire from 1619 to 1621. He was of Turkish origin.

He was the son of İstanköylü Ahmed Pasha, an Ottoman governor of Tunis.

In 1616, he married Fatma Sultan, the daughter of Sultan Mehmed III and his consort Handan Sultan.

Güzelce Ali Pasha died of inflammation of the gallbladder on 9 March 1621, although there were rumours that Sultan Osman II himself had crept into Ali's tent and strangled him with his own hands due to an ill-advised military campaign on the Polish borderlands.

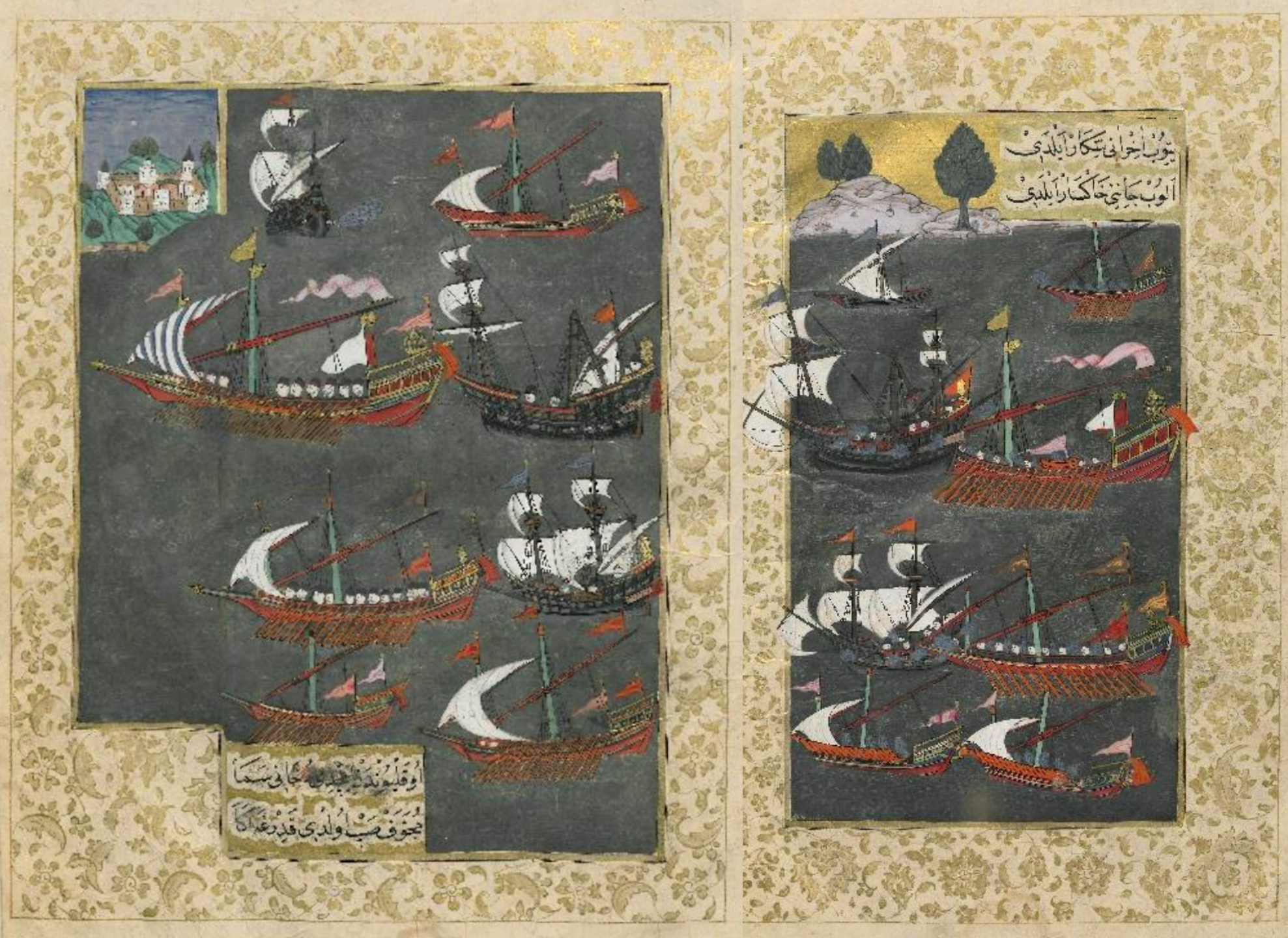
Ottoman navy under ‘Ali Paşa’s command, Şehnāme-i Nādirī, TPML, H. 1124, 28b-29a.

== See also ==
- List of Ottoman grand viziers
- List of Kapudan Pashas

Political offices
Preceded by Öküz Mehmed Pasha	Grand Vizier of the Ottoman Empire; 23 December 1619 – 9 March 1621	Succeeded by Ohrili Hüseyin Pasha
