= Iskender Pasha (governor of Ozi) =

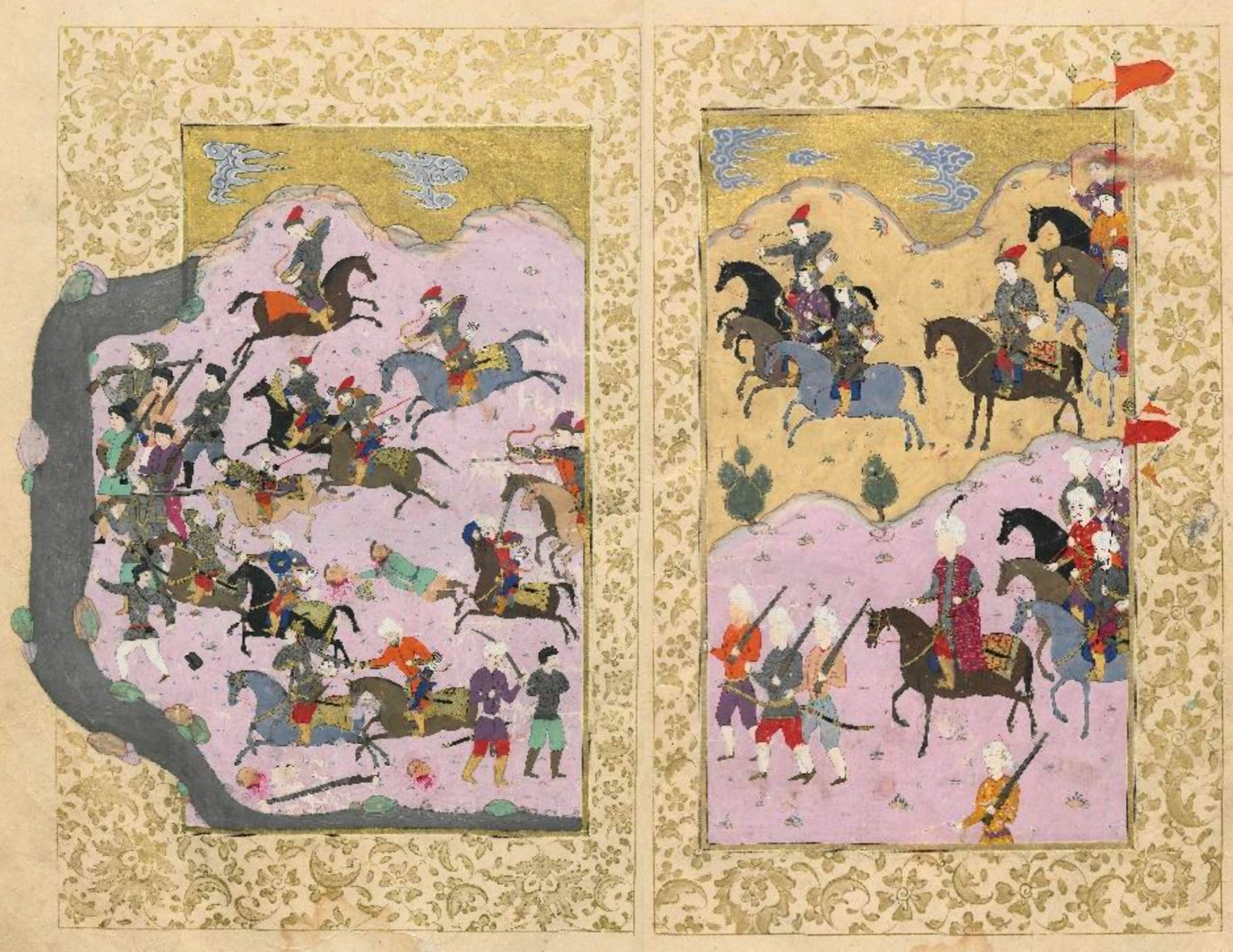
Contemporary depiction of İskender Paşa’s Polish campaign, TPML, H. 1124, 35b-36a.

Iskender Pasha (Ottoman Turkish: اسکندر پاشا, Turkish: İskender Paşa; fl. 1620) was an Ottoman commander and the beylerbey of Oczakov (Ozi). In 1620 Iskender Paşa led an Ottoman army, with Wallachian contingents (13,000-22,000) against the Polish–Lithuanian Commonwealth at the Battle of Cecora, where he was victorious. In 1613–1614 he was the beylerbey of the Bosnia Eyalet.

Political offices
Preceded by ?	Beylerbey of Ozi fl. 1620	Succeeded by ?
Preceded by Karakaş Mehmed Pasha	Beylerbey of Bosnia Eyalet; 1613–14	Succeeded by Abdulbaki Pasha
