= Dutch and Flemish graphics and engravings in the National Museum of Serbia =

Dutch and Flemish graphics and engravings in National Museum of Serbia represent important part of the vast inventory of the Serbia's National Museum. There are over 220 graphics, etchings and engraves in National Museum of Serbia, Belgrade from Hendrik Goltzius-(10 graphics), Rembrandt - (5 etchings and 3 graphics), Jan Toorop-(15 prints), Sadeler family - (10 works), Lucas van Leyden, Jan van de Velde, Cornelis Bos, Frederik Bouttats the Younger, Adriaen van Ostade, Nicolaes Pietersz. Berchem, Lucas Vorsterman, James Ensor-(2 works), Aegidius Sadeler, Jozef Peeters, Carel Willink, Marius Bauer etc.

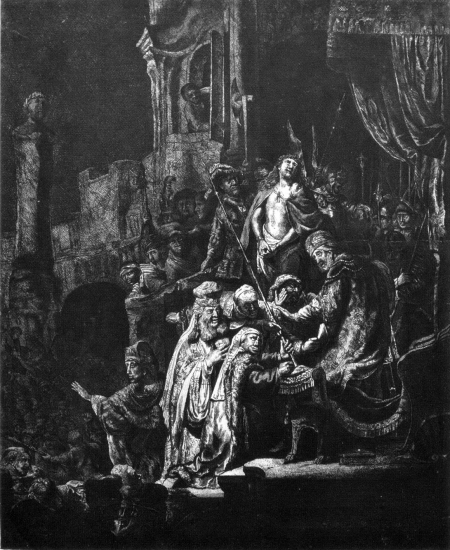
Ecce Hommo by Rembrandt

== List ==
- Scenes from Genesis, by Marten de Vos
- Annunciation, graphic by Hendrik Goltzius
- Forteress by the river, by Jan van de Velde
- Last Supper, graphic by Sadeler family
- Hearing, by Jan Dirksz Both
- Vision, by Jan Dirksz Both
- Ecce homo, copper etching by Rembrandt c. 1636
- Self Portrait with hat, graphic by Rembrandt c. 1630
- Portrait of Man, etching by Rembrandt
- Man with bag, etching by Rembrandt c. 1635
- Merchants expulsion from the temple, etching by Rembrandt c. 1635
- Old man and boy, graphic by Rembrandt
- Old man with hat and pearls, graphic by Rembrandt
- Self Portrait with toga, etching by Rembrandt
- Self Portrait, graphic by Rembrandt
- Apoteosa, graphic by Peter Paul Rubens
- Old Amsterdam, graphic by Lucas van Leyden
- Death over the city, graphic by James Ensor
