= Pieter Stevens II =

Flemish painter

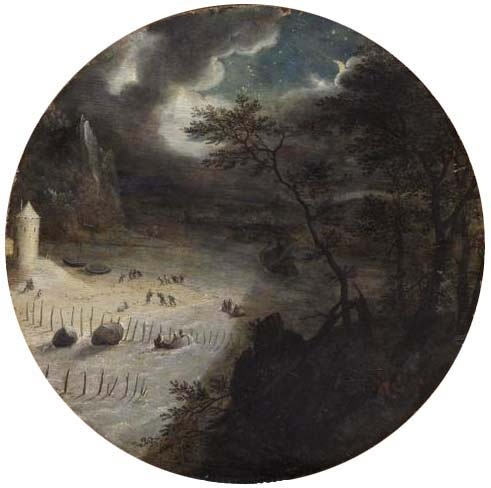
Fishing at night

Pieter Stevens II or Peter Stevens II (ca. 1567 in Mechelen – after 1626 in Prague) was a Flemish painter and draughtsman known for his landscapes. He left Flanders to work for the court of Emperor Rudolf II in Prague. The circulation of prints made after a series of romantic Bohemian landscape drawings by Stevens and other artists had an important influence on the development of Flemish and Dutch landscape art in the 17th century.

== Life ==
Little documentary evidence survives for the life of Pieter Stevens. He was likely born in Mechelen somewhere between 1557 and 1577. There is no information as to whether he was related to Pieter Stevens I, a draughtsman active between 1550 and 1570.

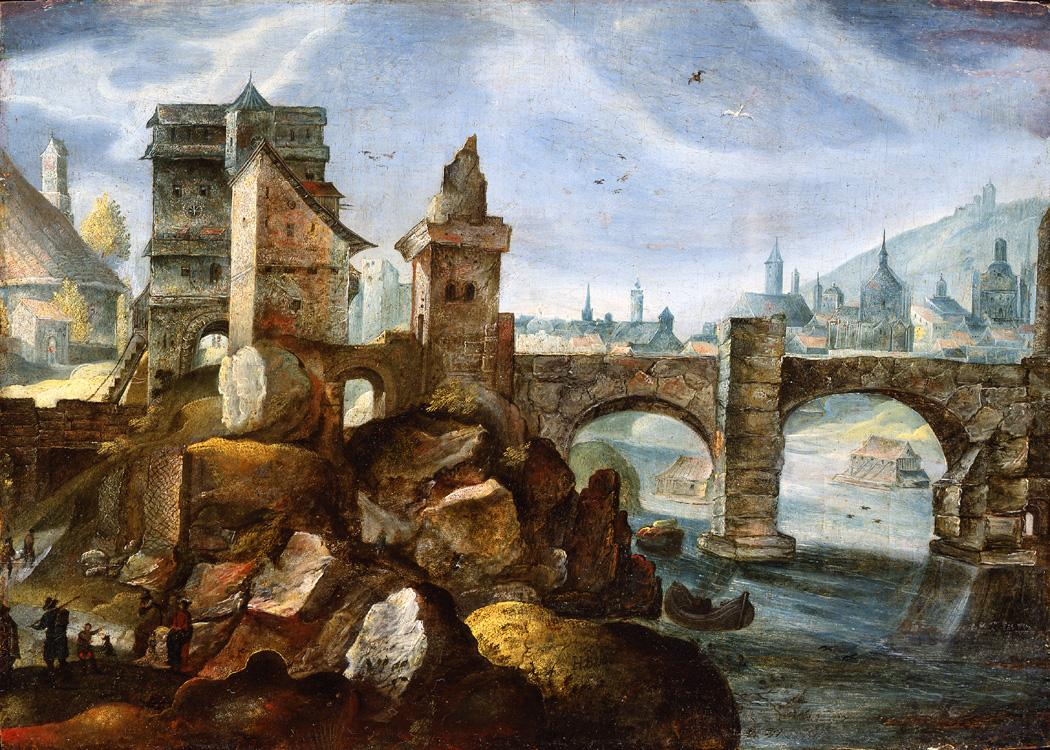
Capriccio View of a City (possibly Prague)

A group of Roman views dated to 1590–91 has been interpreted as an indication that he visited Italy as a young man. However, these drawings are rather crude and probably based on works of Jan Brueghel the Elder and are therefore no evidence that he visited Italy in those years. However, he may have done somewhat later as the first mature works known by him dated 1592 represent views of Roman sights.

By April 1594 Stevens is recorded in Prague at his appointment as a court painter to the Emperor Rudolf II, with a salary of 8 guilders per month. It is likely that he became acquainted with the many other Flemish and Dutch artists active at the Prague court such as Roelandt Savery, Paulus van Vianen, Hans Vredeman de Vries, his son Paul Vredeman de Vries and Philippus van den Bossche. After Rudolf's death in 1612, Stevens likely entered the service of Karl I, Prince of Liechtenstein.

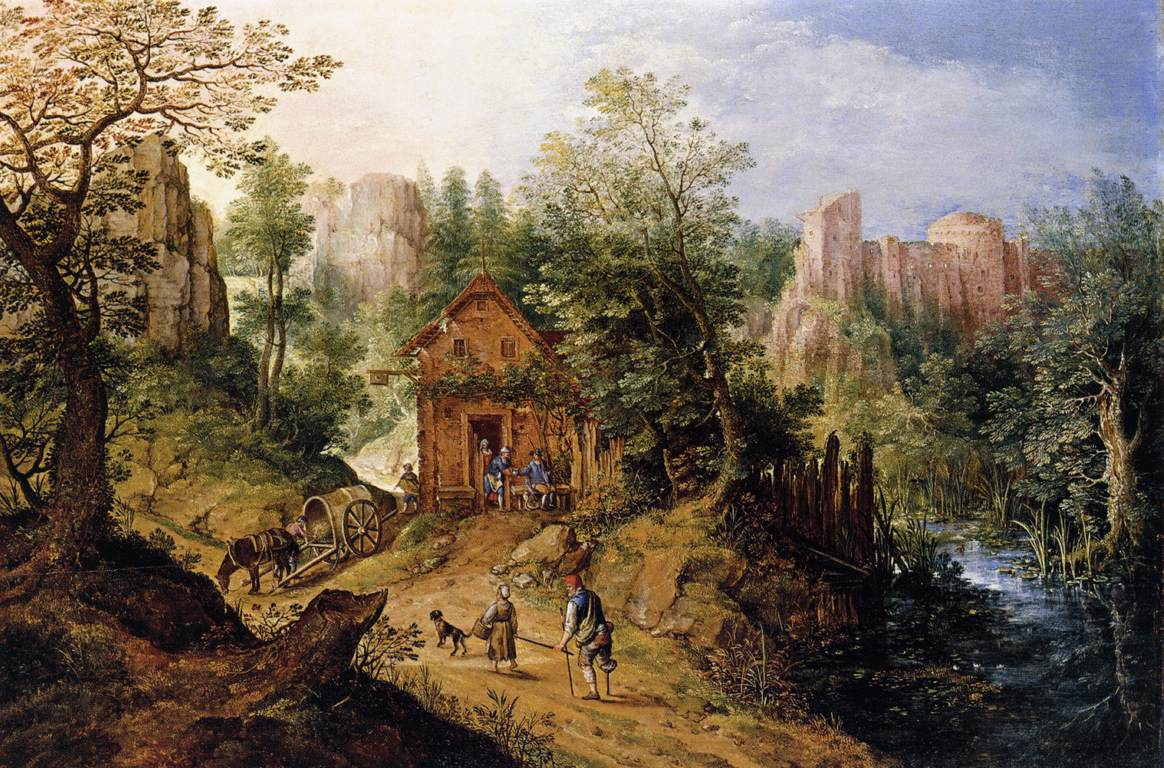
Mountain Valley with Inn and Castle

Details about the time and place of his death are not available. He must have died between 1626 and 1632 as in 1626 he was last recorded in connection with the funeral of his son Šroněk and in 1632 his daughter sold his house, for which she required a proxy of her brother, a sign that the artist was then deceased.

He was the father of Anton II (who trained under him) and Peter III. He was an uncle of Maurus Moreels (II) of Mechelen who studied under him in Prague and had a successful career as a history and portrait painter upon his return to Flanders. Two of his grandsons were also painters in Prague.

== Work ==
Pieter Stevens II was principally a painter and draughtsman of landscapes. The earliest known work of Stevens is the Mountain valley with inn and castle, dated 1593 (Museumslandschaft Hessen Kassel). The composition is executed in a very refined finish and was possibly the work he made to support his application for a position at the Imperial court. Innovative through its complete omission of a view into the distance this painting heralds the idyllic close-up landscape of the 17th century. His contemporaries would probably have been more aware of the uncanniness of the sealed off, swampy valley with its ruinous castle, decaying inn and invalid wayfarers. They would likely have understood these details as symbols of the wickedness of the world, the arrogance of the powerful and the licentiousness of the lowly who can expect punishment.

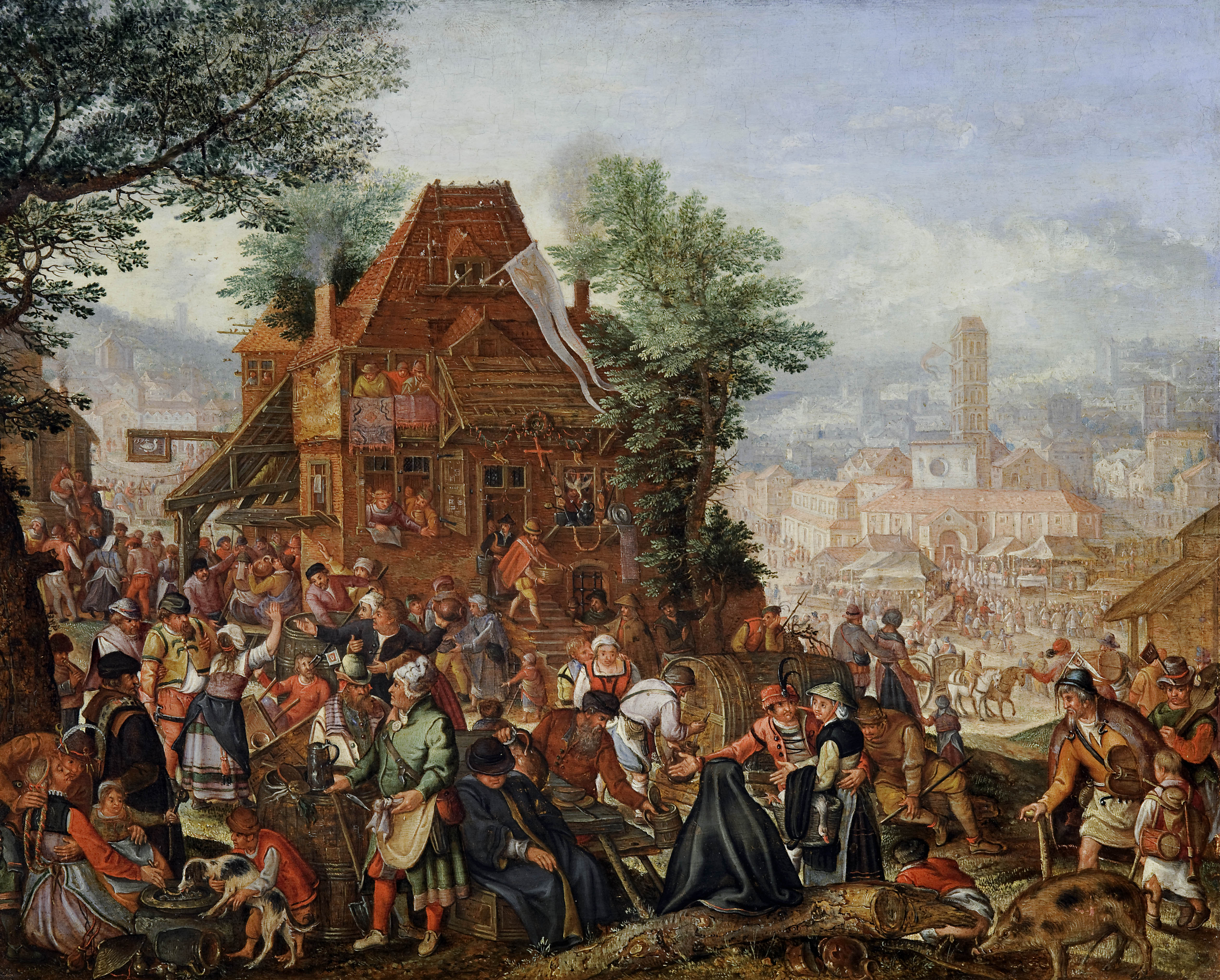
Feast on the anniversary of a church consecration

His early landscapes show genre elements as can be seen in the Feast on the anniversary of a church consecration (Fondation Custodia, Paris) dated 1594 and the Kermesse in the countryside dated 1596 (Royal Museum of Fine Arts Antwerp). The Feast on the anniversary of a church consecration shows a crowded fair near an inn held to mark the anniversary of the consecration of a church. The scene is set in Rome even though such celebrations were actually a northern tradition. The church in the background on the right has been identified as Santa Maria in Cosmedin on the Forum Boarium. As Stevens possibly never went to Rome he must have relied on other artists' work for the Roman details.

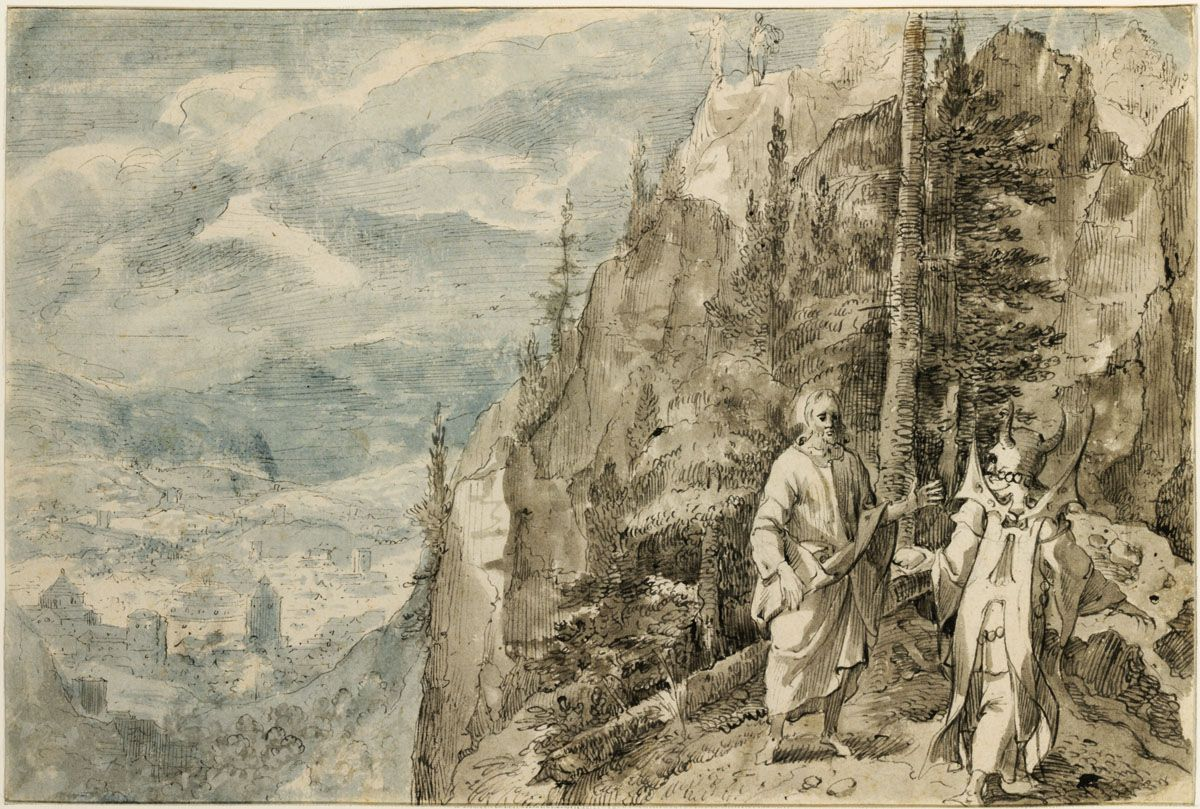
The Temptation of Christ

These early compositions are clearly linked to the style of contemporary works produced by Flemish landscape artists such as Hendrick van Cleve III, Hans Bol, Lucas van Valckenborch, Paul Bril and the members of the Frankenthal School.

Many of Stevens' works depict nocturnal landscapes of a romantic character. These works show his interest in light and atmospheric effects. A good example is the Fishing at Night of c. 1600 (Kunsthistorisches Museum). This is even more pronounced in his drawings where there is a clear move away from his early drawings with pen and dark brown or black ink with deep blue washes in favour of the brush and a combination of soft tones. It is possible that Jan Brueghel the Elder's visit to Prague in 1604 played a role in the change as Brueghel favoured a similar wash technique. The influence of Jan Brueghel is further apparent in the greater sense of volume and better integration of the figures. He drew around 1604 a numbered series of views around Brussels, Rome, Naples and Prague, which he probably intended to be engraved.

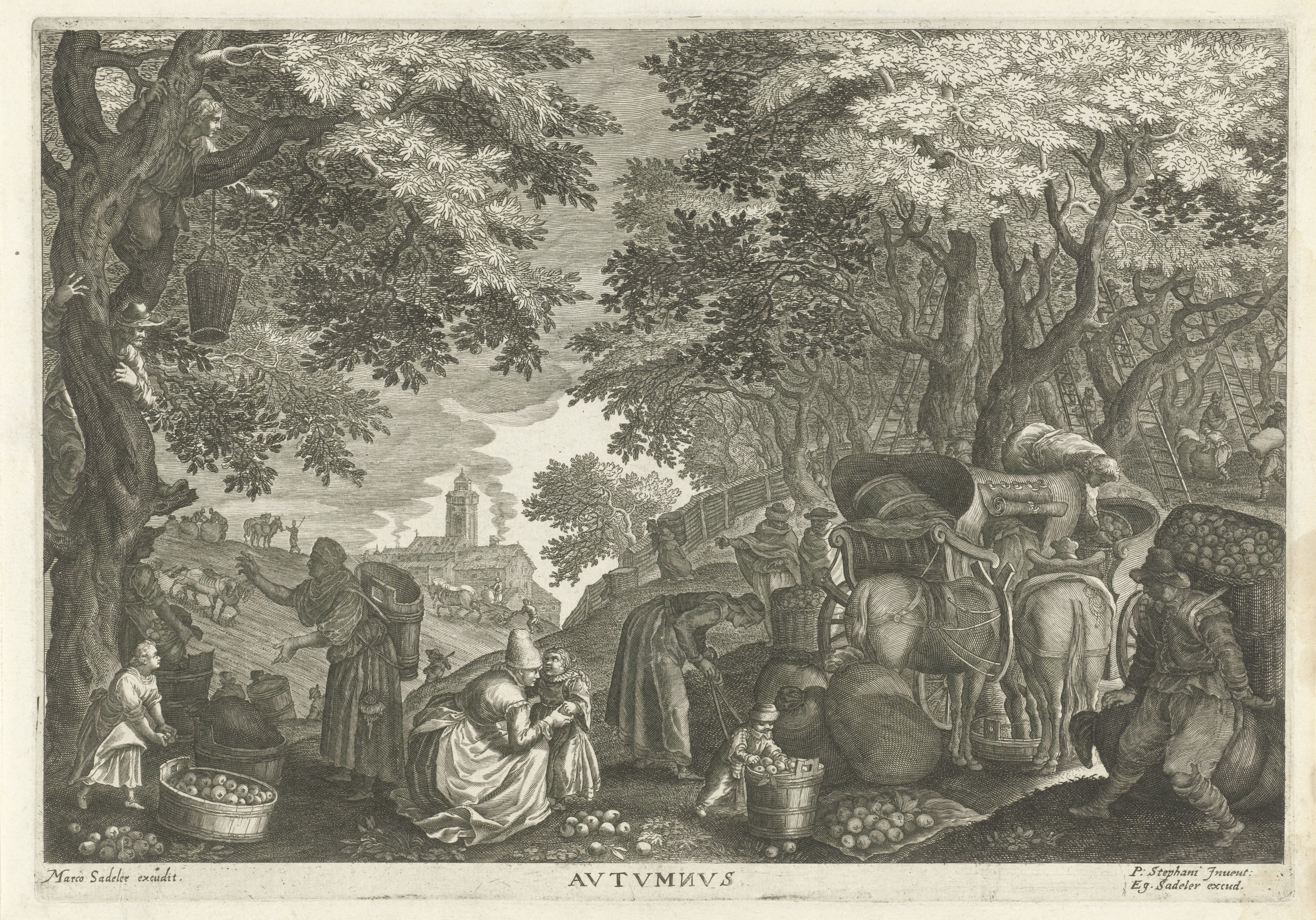
Autumn, Aegidius Sadeler after Stevens

Landscape designs by Stevens and Jan Brueghel and others were reproduced in hardstone in the imperial workshop and used as 'Florentine mosaics' to decorate luxurious furniture. He thanked his renown in his time to the reproduction of his designs by various engravers, including Aegidius Sadeler, Hendrik Hondius I, Isaac Major and Joannes Barra. Sadeler's series of romantic Bohemian forest landscapes engraved in Prague after designs by Stevens and other artists formed an important element in the development of 17th-century Dutch and Flemish landscape painting. Sadeler also published the Four Seasons and The Twelve Months after Pieter Stevens' designs.
