= Křivoklát Castle =

Castle in Křivoklát in the Czech Republic

Coordinates: 50°02′16″N 13°52′21″E

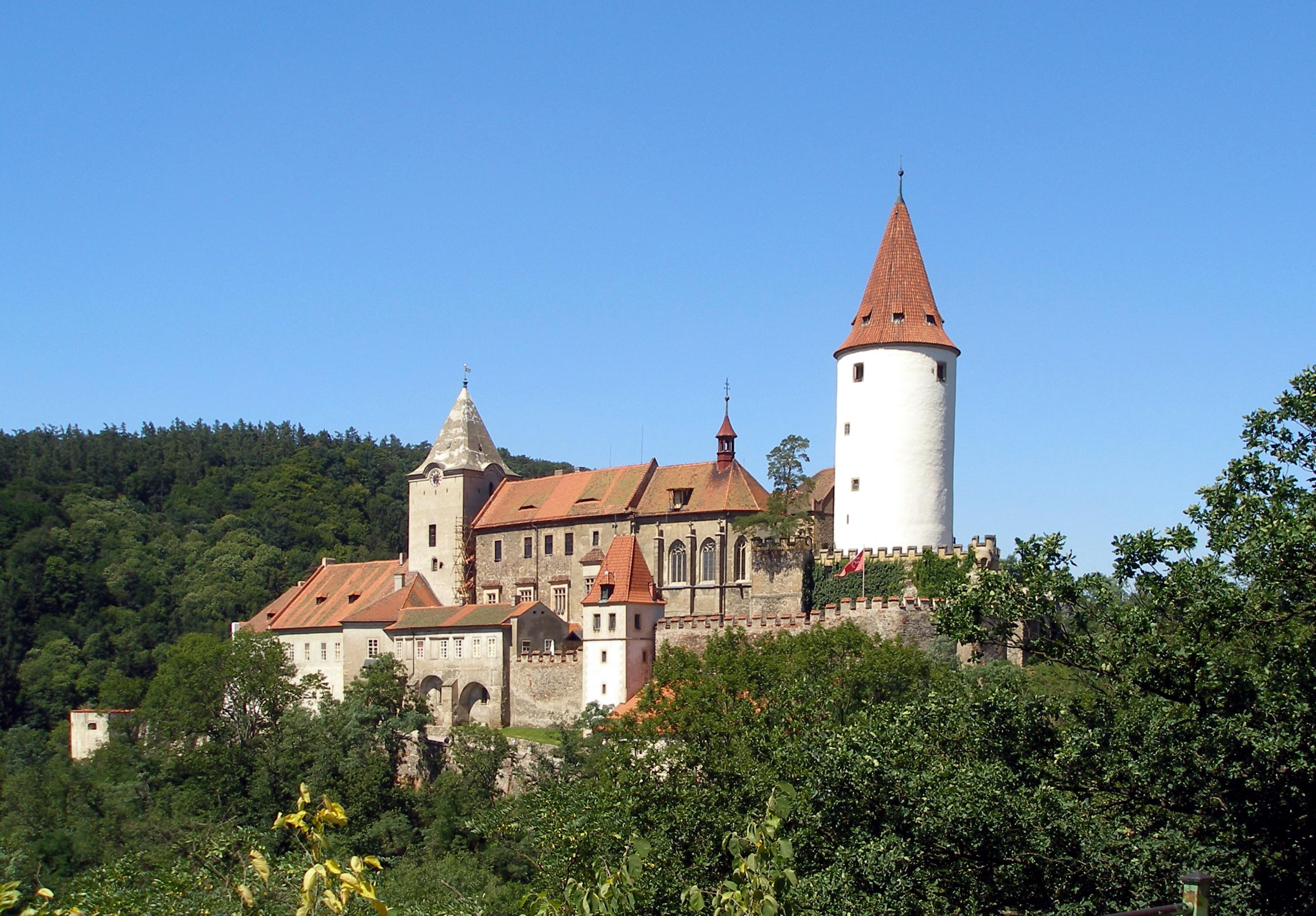
Křivoklát Castle

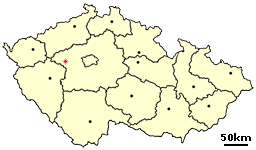
Location of Křivoklát Castle in the Czech Republic

Křivoklát Castle (Czech: hrad Křivoklát) is a castle in Křivoklát in the Central Bohemian Region of the Czech Republic. It is protected as a national cultural monument.

== History ==
Křivoklát was founded in the 12th century, belonging to the kings of Bohemia. During the reign of Otakar II of Bohemia a large, monumental royal castle was built, later rebuilt by King Wenceslaus IV and later enlarged by King Vladislaus II.

The castle was damaged by fire several times. It was turned into a harsh prison and the building slowly deteriorated. During the 19th century, the Fürstenberg family became the owners of the castle and had it reconstructed after a fire in 1826. The Fürstenberg family owned the castle until 1929.

Today the castle serves as a museum, tourist destination and place for theatrical exhibitions. Collections of hunting weapons, Gothic paintings and books are stored there.

Křivoklát Castle served as a primary filming location for Halsey's 2021 visual album If I Can’t Have Love, I Want Power.

== Gallery ==
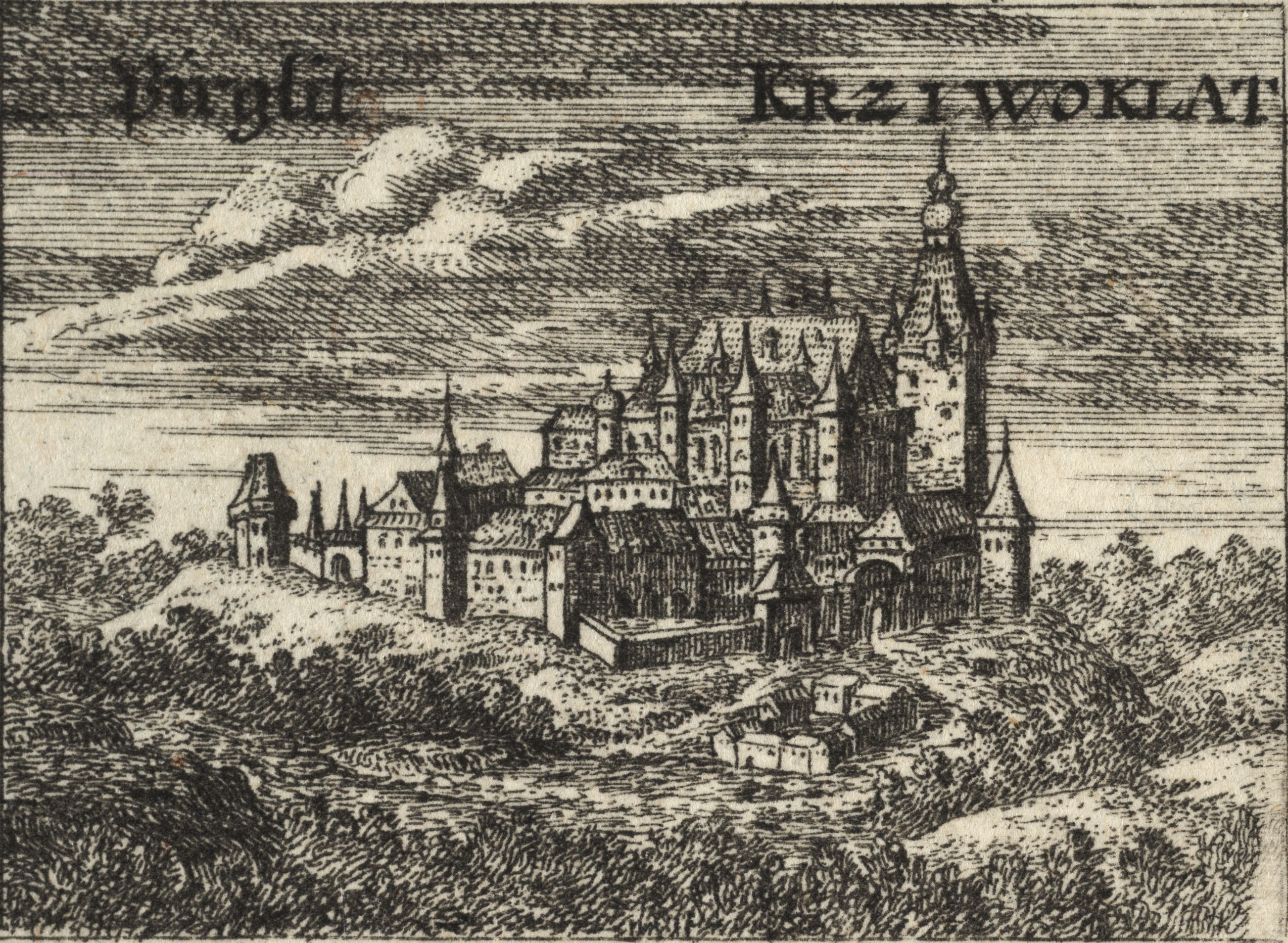
Křivoklát on an engraving by Wenceslaus Hollar from the 17th century

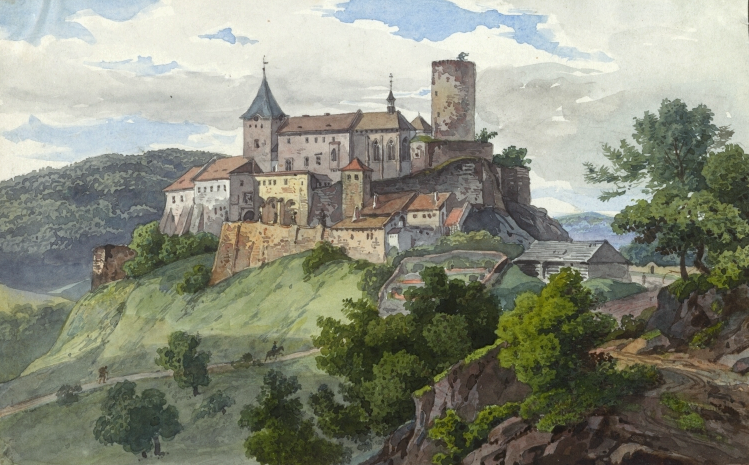
Křivoklát on a watercolor by Antonín Mánes from 1835

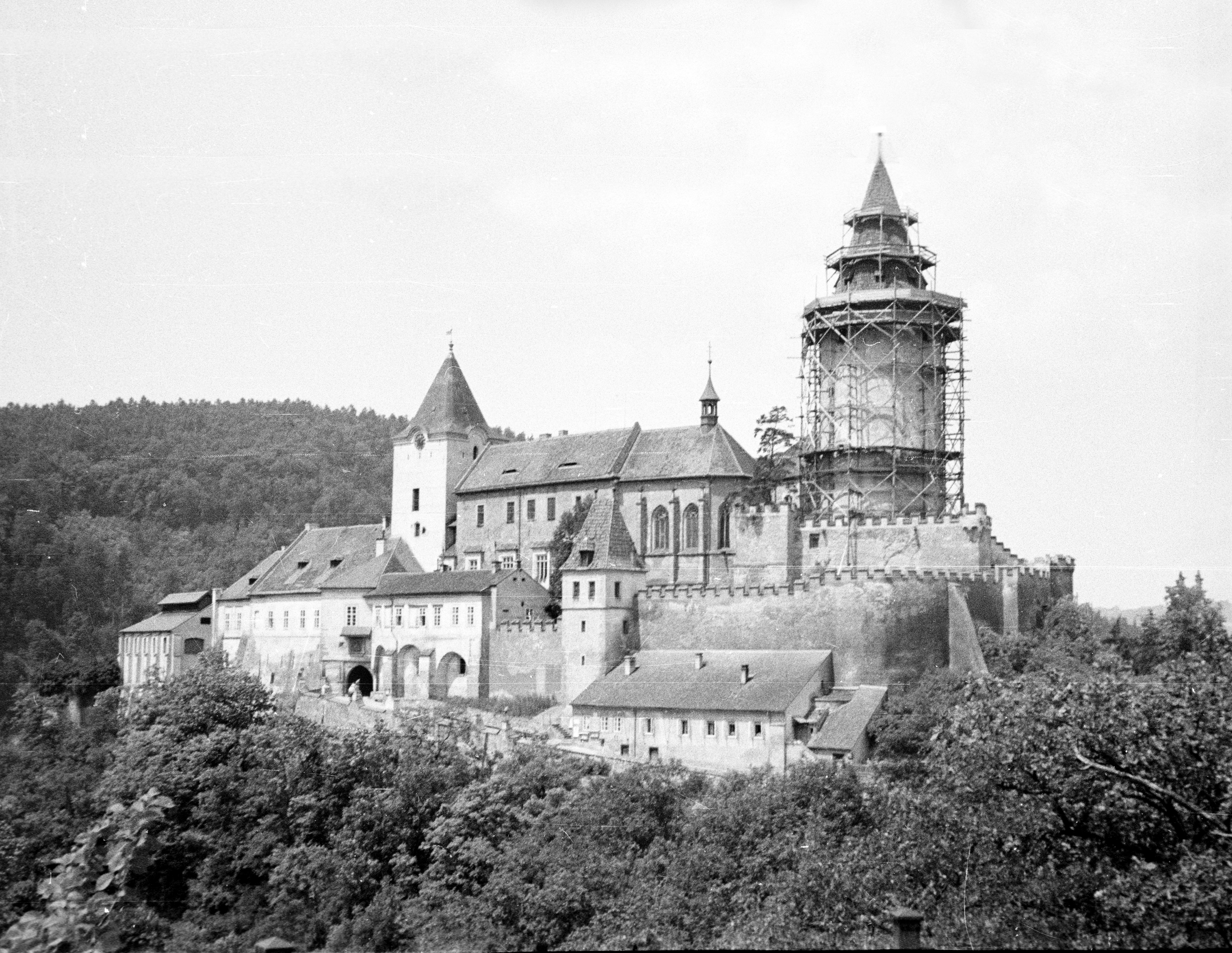
Krivoklat around 1958 when its main tower was reconstructed

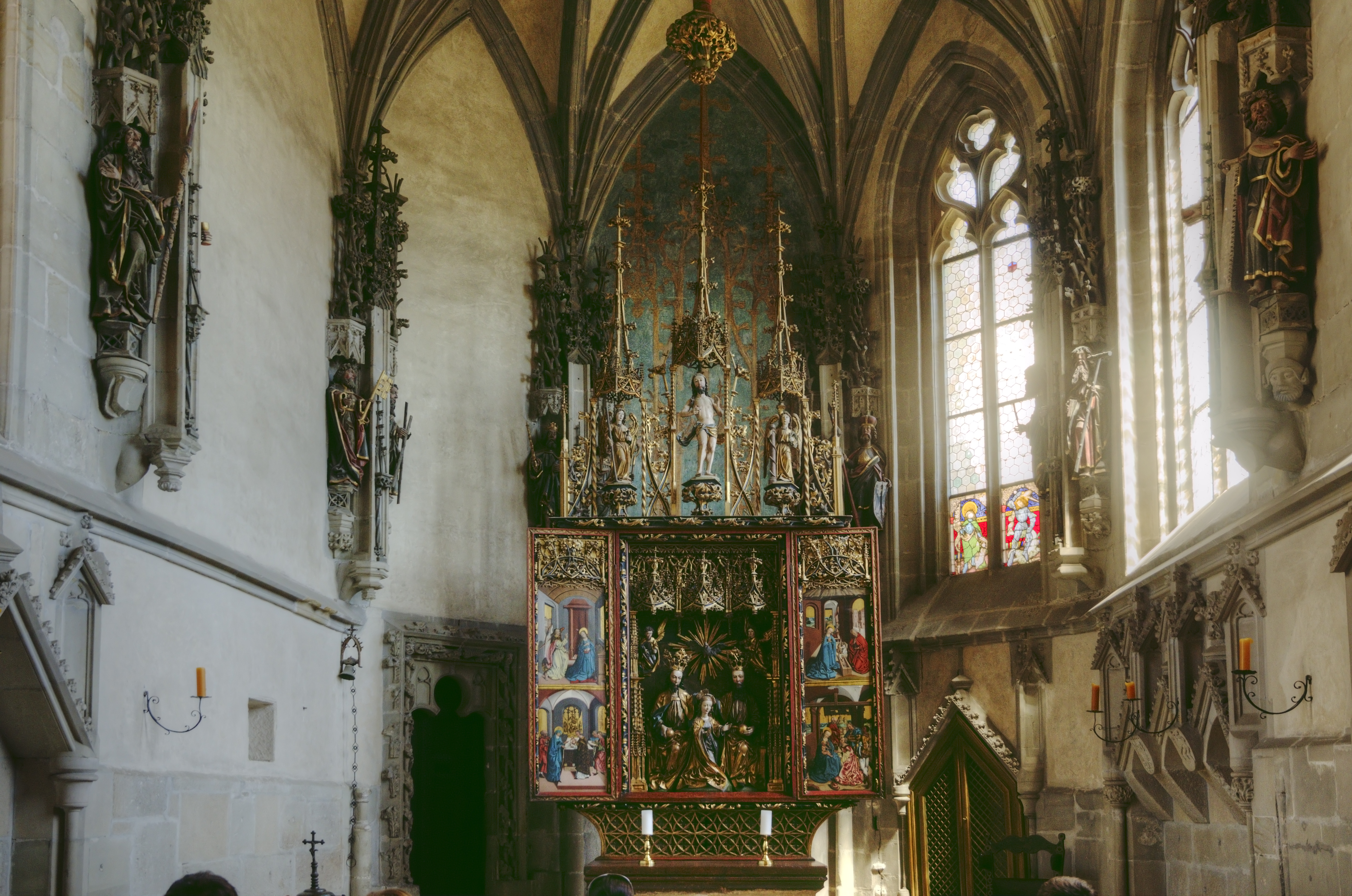
Altar in the Chapel of the Coronation of the Virgin Mary from the 1490s

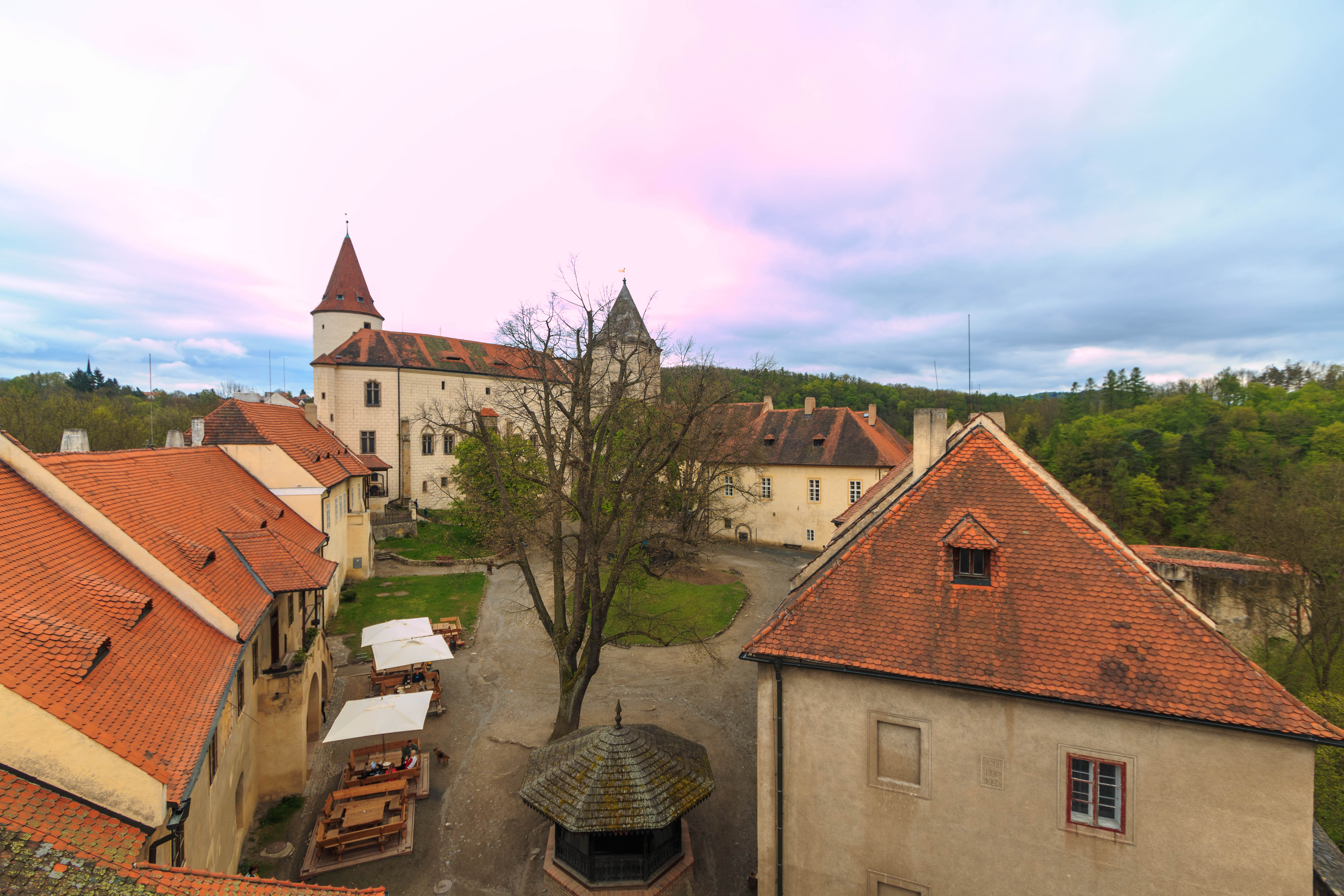
Lower courtyard

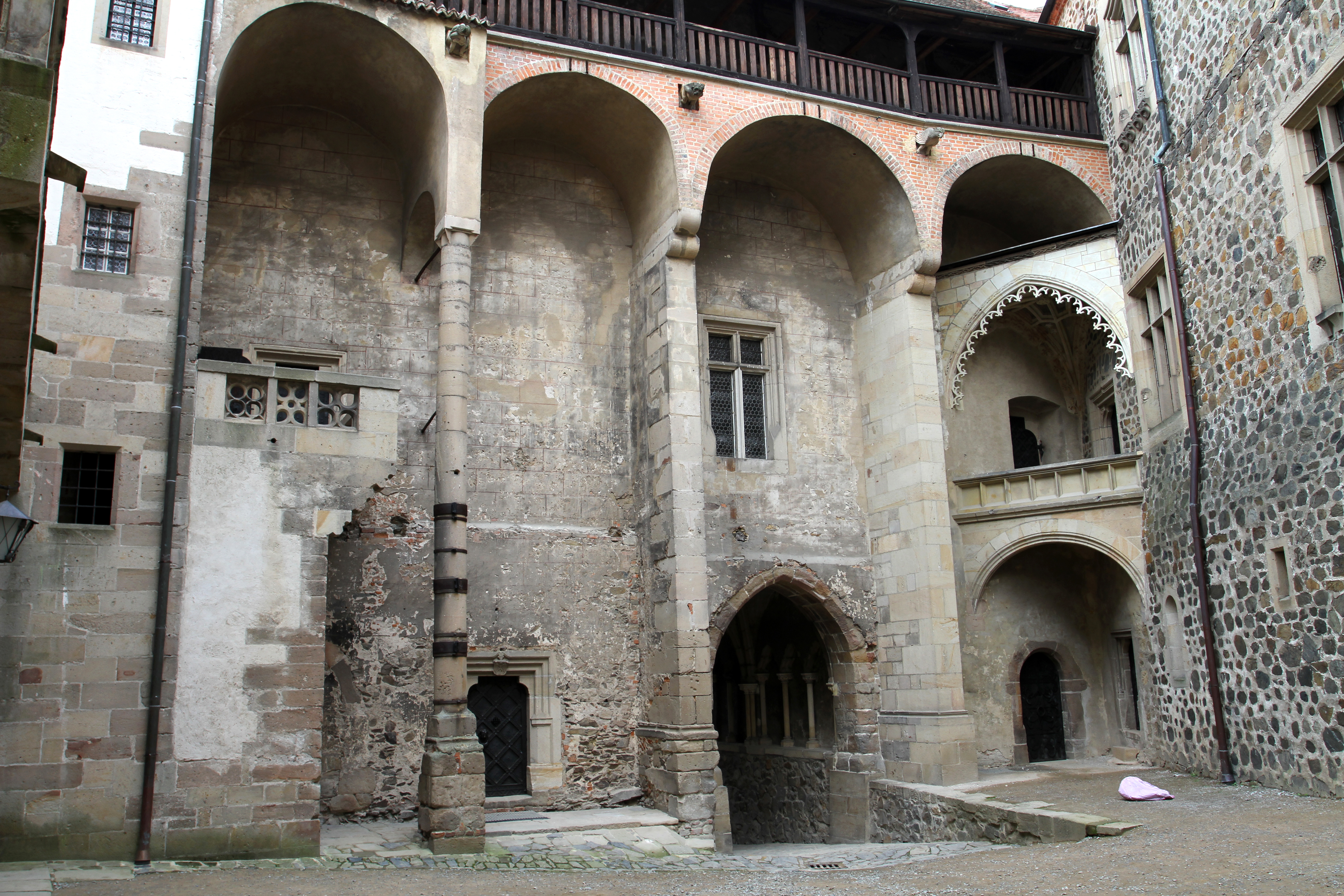
Upper courtyard

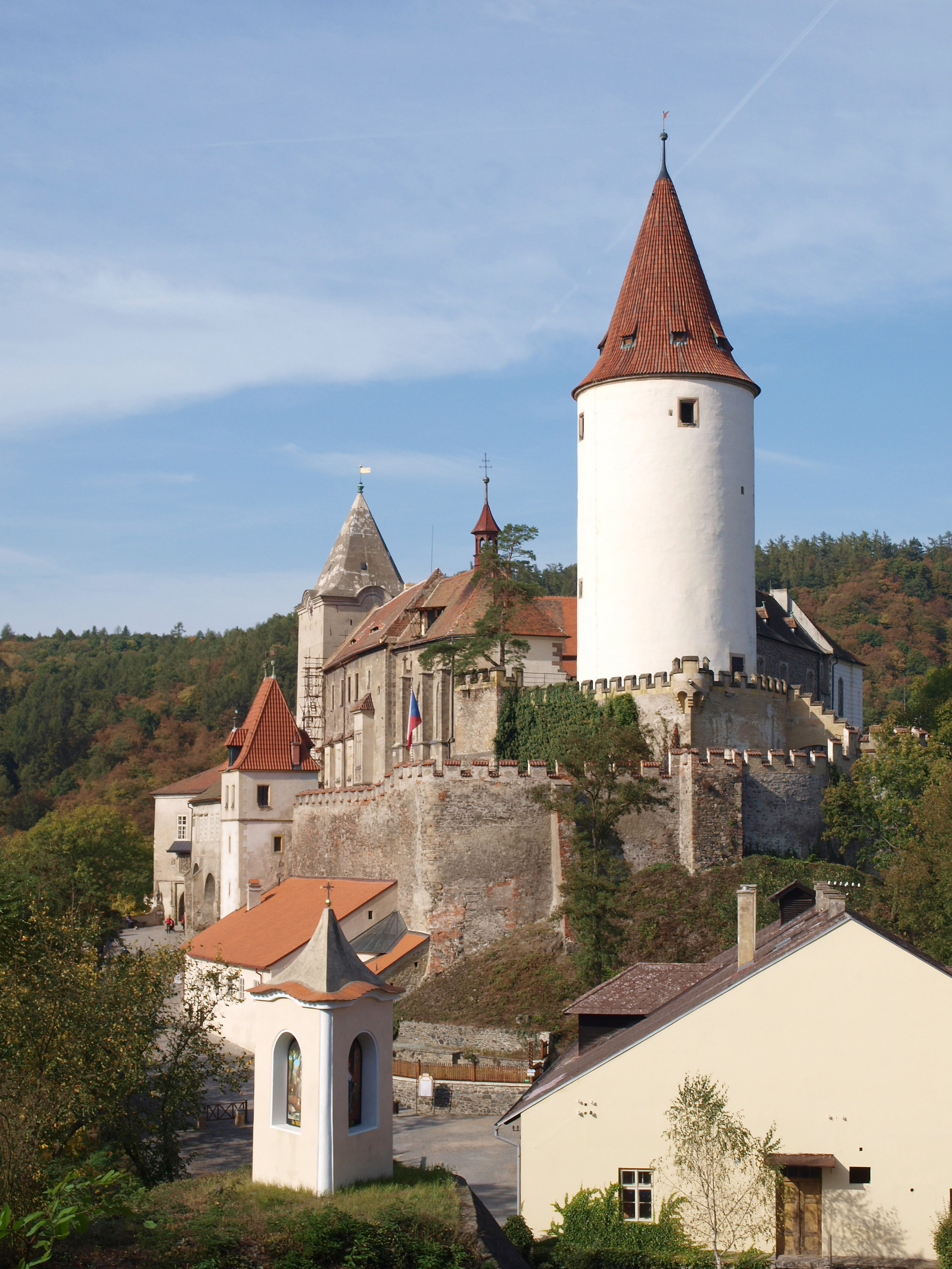
View from the east

== Notable prisoners ==
- Burkhard von Berlichingen
- Edward Kelley
- Hieronymus Makowsky
