= Filseck Castle =

- Schloß Filseck
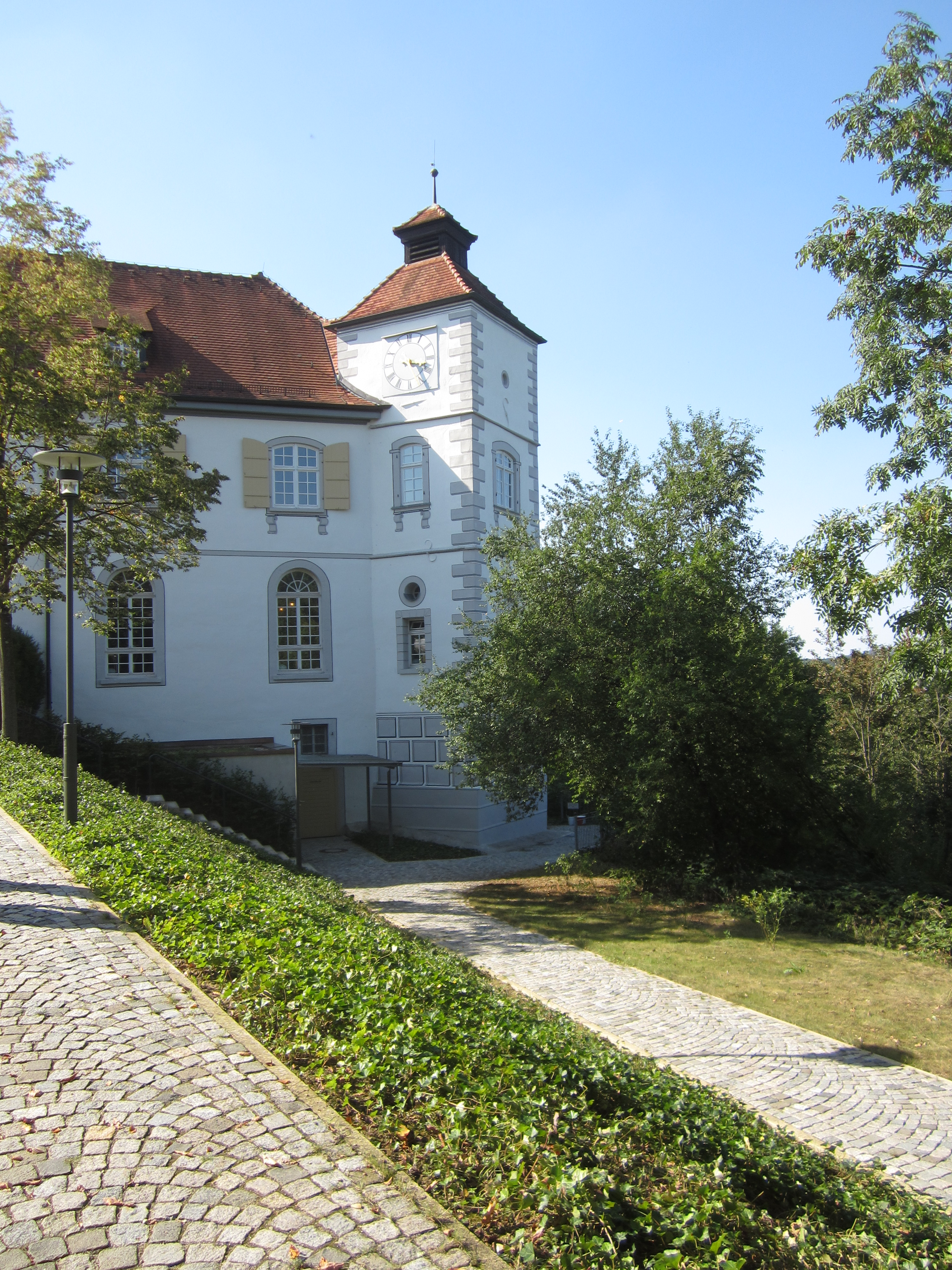
- The North-East Tower

- Location within Baden-Württemberg Location within Germany

General information
- Status: renovated
- Type: castle
- Architectural style: Renaissance
- Location: 73066 Uhingen, Germany
- Coordinates: 48.7008°N 9.6043°E
- Current tenants: Schloss Filseck Stiftung
- Renovated: 1986-1994

Website
- www.schloss-filseck.de

Filseck Castle (German: Schloß Filseck) stands on a promontory where the Pfuhlbach joins the river Fils (a tributary of the Neckar) near Uhingen in the district of Göppingen, Baden-Württemberg, Germany. The castle is now a restaurant, museum and cultural centre, and houses the Göppingen District Archive.

== History ==
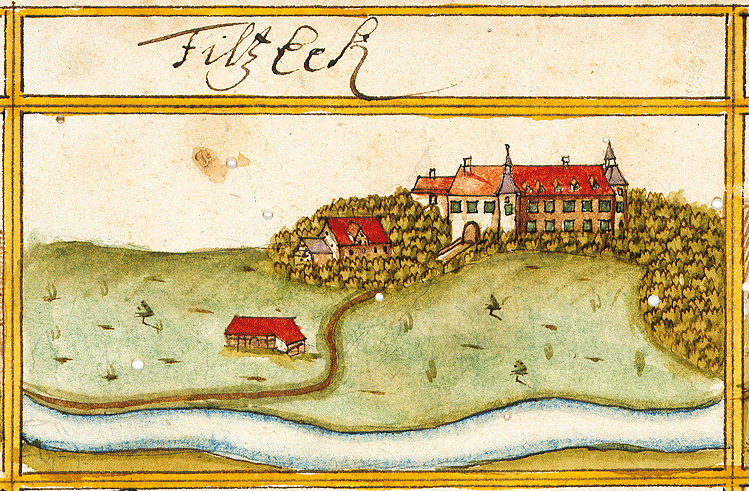
A depiction of Filseck Castle in the forest register books created by Andreas Kieser (c. 1680)

The original castle was built in the 13th century by the Counts of Aichelberg. It was acquired by Burkhard von Berlichingen in 1596, and renovated in a Renaissance style. From 1749 to 1920 the castle was owned by the Von Münch banking dynasty.

In 1971 a fire burnt down the south and the west wings of the castle. Göppingen district acquired the property in 1986, and restoration work was completed in 1994. Since 2008 the castle has been run by the Schloss Filseck Stiftung (Filseck Castle Foundation) of the Kreissparkasse Göppingen (Göppingen District Savings Bank).
