= Aegidius Sadeler =

Flemish engraver

- Aegidius Sadeler engraved by Pieter de Jode II after a self-portrait
- Born: 1570; Antwerp, Spanish Netherlands
- Died: 1629 (aged 58–59); Prague, Holy Roman Empire

Aegidius Sadeler or Aegidius Sadeler II (1570–1629) was a Flemish engraver who was principally active at the Prague court of Rudolf II, Holy Roman Emperor and his successors.

== Life ==
Sadeler was born in Antwerp in the Sadeler family of print dealers and engravers. He was the son of Emmanuel de Sayeleer and the nephew of Aegidius I, Jan I en Raphael Sadeler. He was trained by his uncle Jan I and became a member of the Antwerp Guild of St. Luke in 1589. He was active in Munich the next year in 1590, in Rome in 1593, in Naples and then again in Munich in 1594–1597. From 1597 he settled in Prague where he became court engraver for Rudolf II and made engraved portraits of notables and engravings after artworks there, most notably paintings by Bartholomeus Spranger, Roelant Savery, Hans von Aachen, Giuseppe Arcimboldo, and sculptures by Giambologna and Adriaen de Vries.

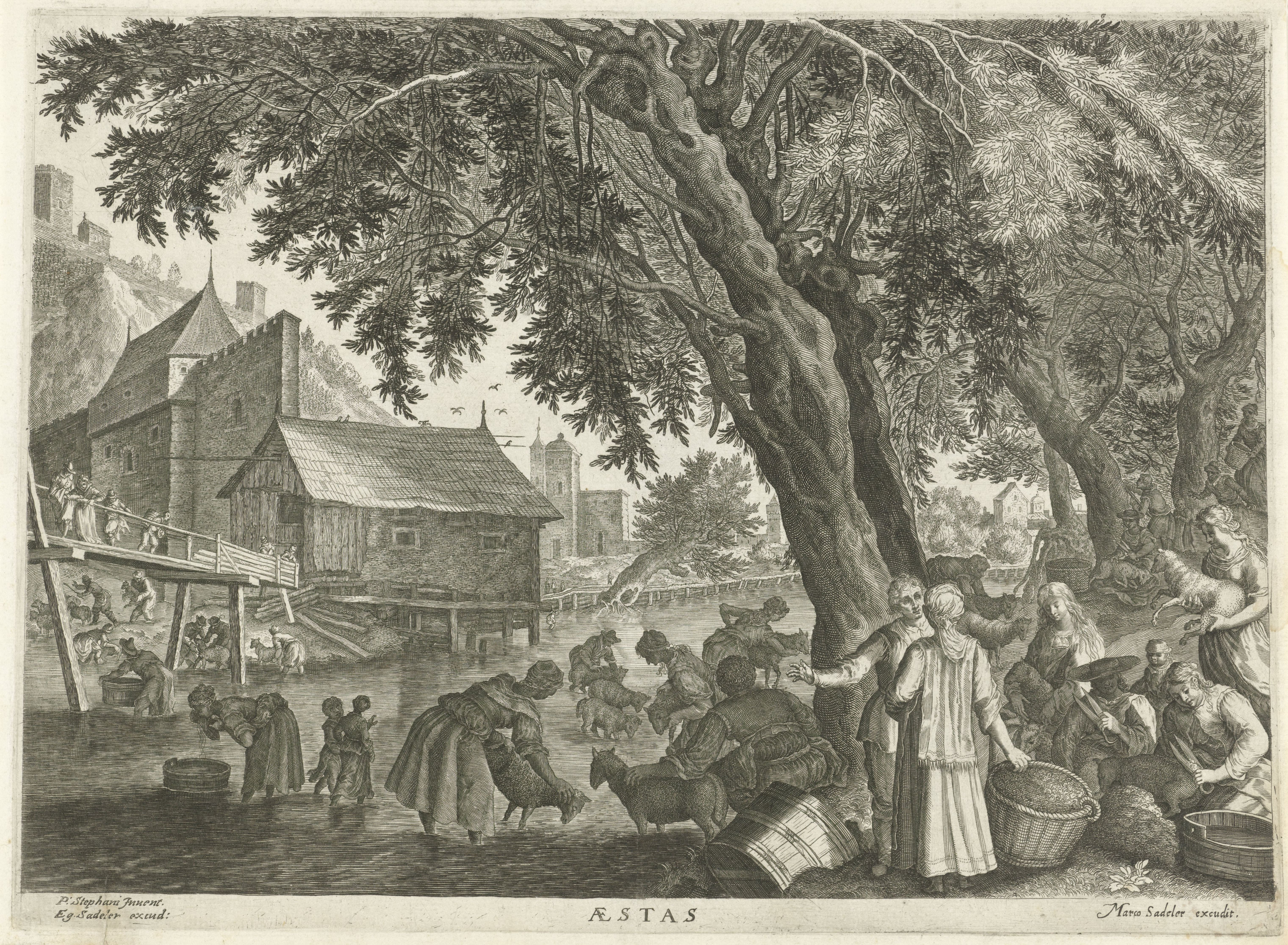
Summer, after Pieter Stevens II

His early engravings were mostly faithful copies of works by Albrecht Dürer in the Imperial collection and copies of paintings by notable Italian painters such as Raphael, Tintoretto, Parmigianino, Barocci and Titian or by Northern painters who worked there, such as Paul Bril and Denys Calvaert. In Prague he also engraved portraits of the notables of Rudolf's court, and collaborated with Spranger, Joseph Heintz the Elder, Jacobus Typotius and his friend Anselmus Boece de Boodt (1550–1632), Rudolf II's gemologist and physician.

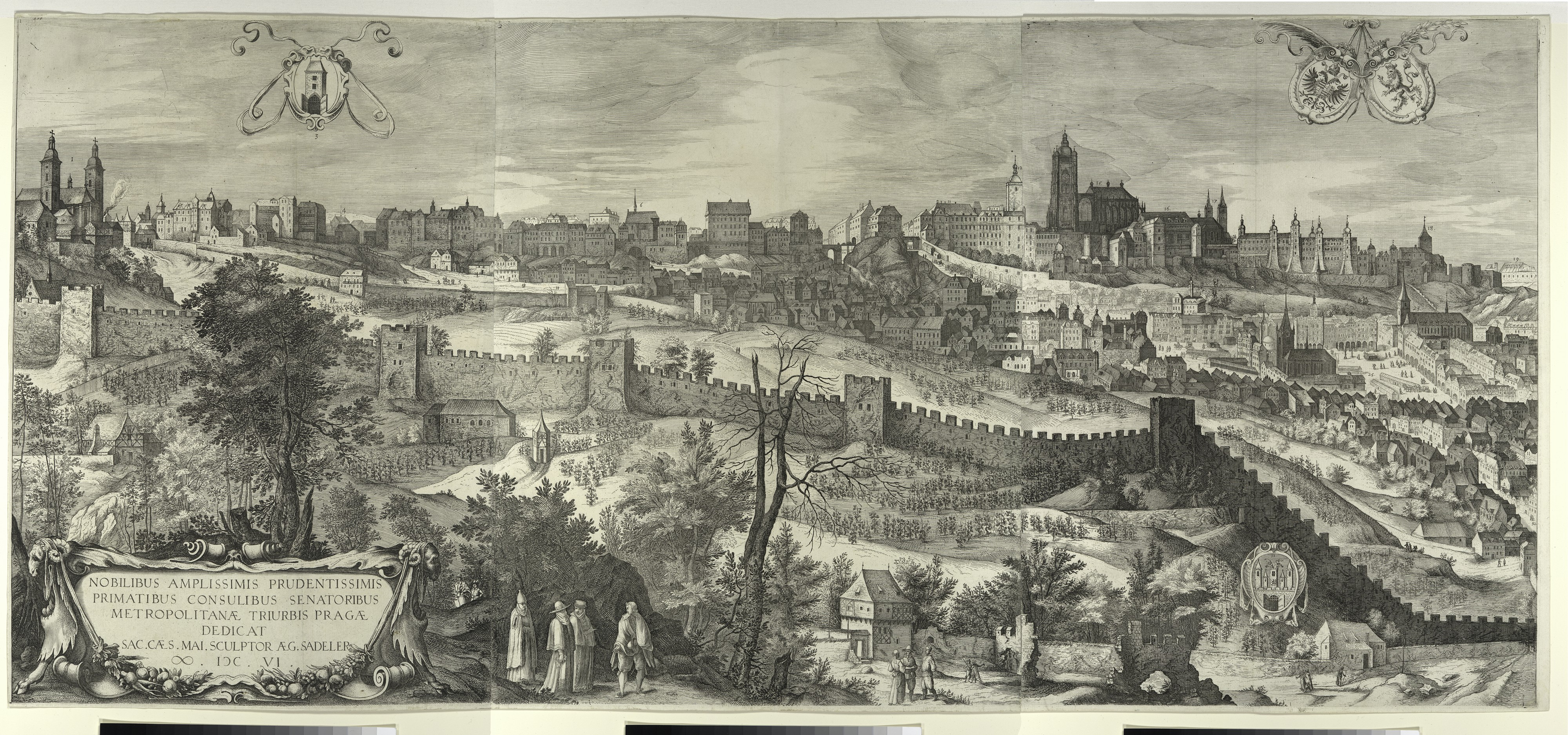
View of Prague, showing a reproduction of the first three plates from the left-hand section of the Sadeler Prospect.

After Rudolf II died he enjoyed the favour and protection of the two succeeding Emperors, Matthias and Ferdinand II. According to Michael Bryan, "He used the graver with a commanding facility, sometimes finishing his plates with surprising neatness, when the subject required it; at other times his burin is broad and bold. His plates are very numerous, representing historical subjects, portraits, landscapes, &c. some of them from his own designs, many of which are much esteemed, particularly his portraits, which are executed in an admirable style.

Sadeler died in Prague in 1629. He had many pupils, including Wenzel Hollar and Joachim von Sandrart, who wrote his biography.

His prints include:

== Portraits ==
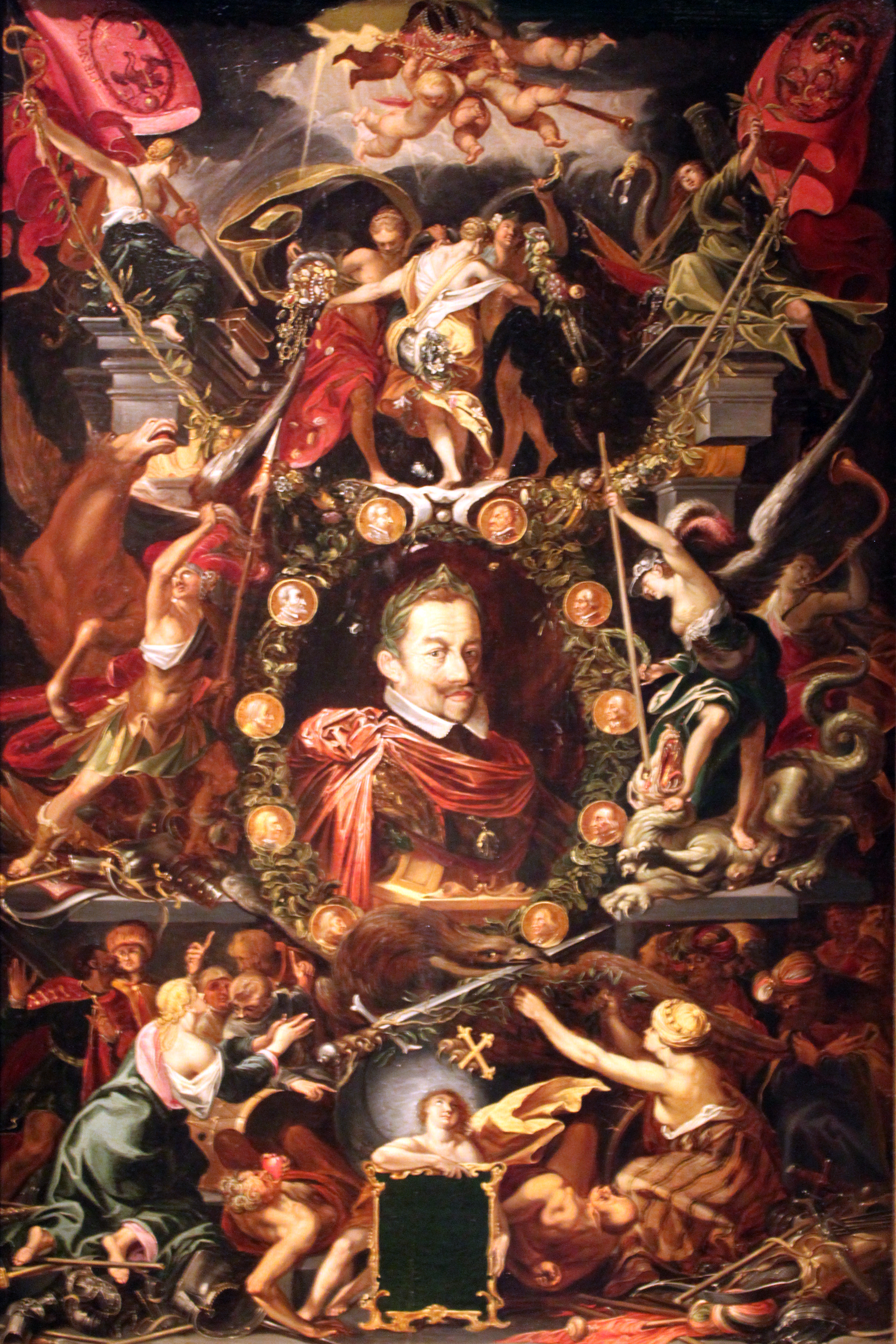
Allegory on the reign of Emperor Matthias, 1614

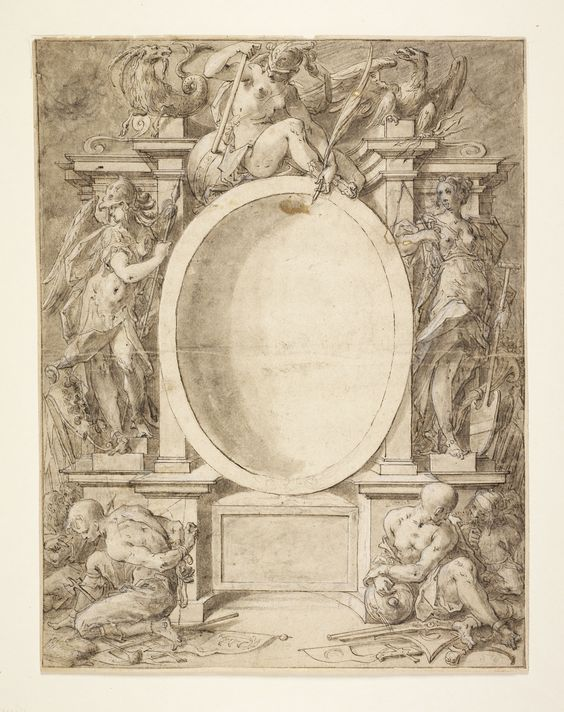
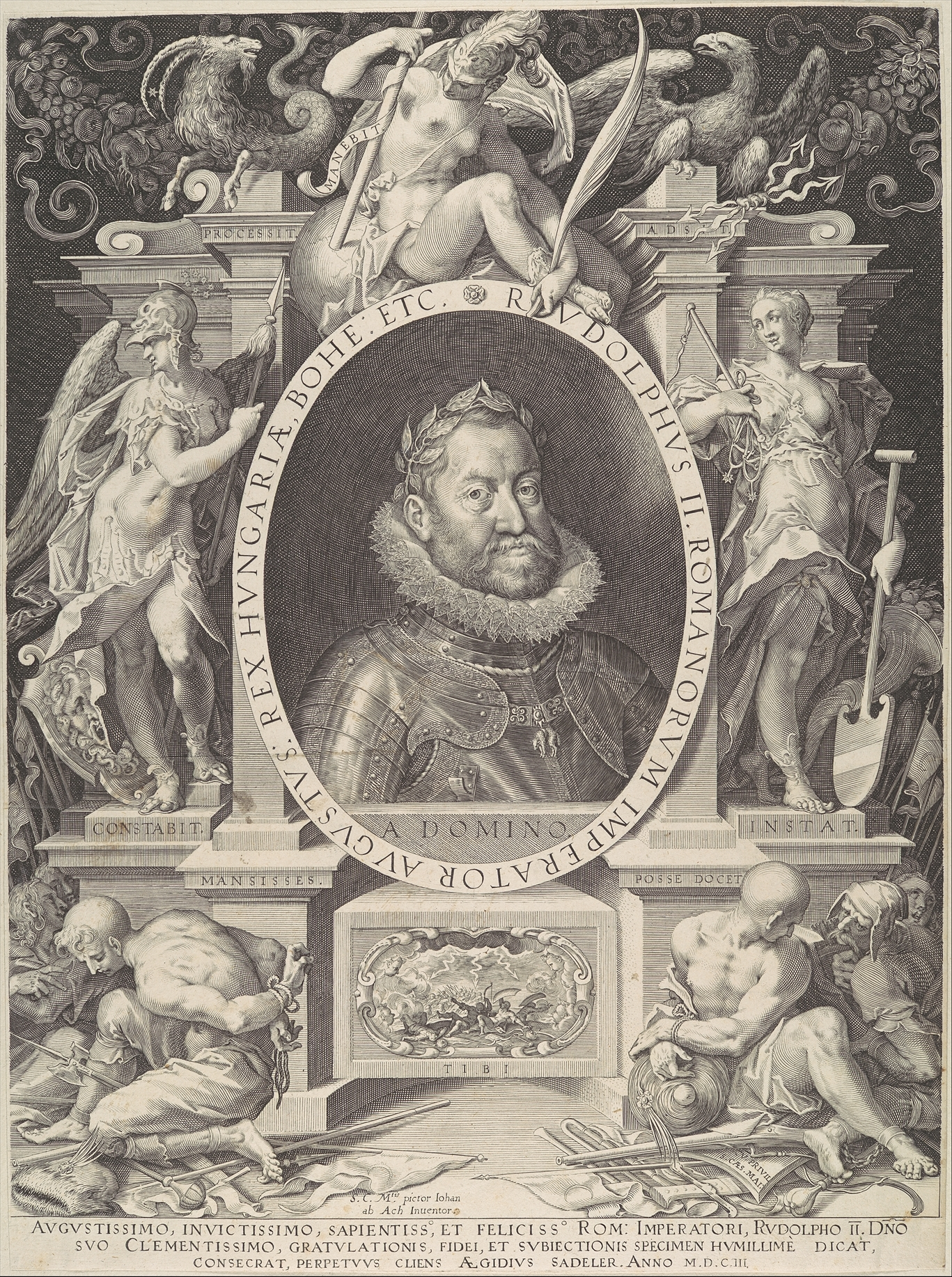
Preparatory drawing by Hans von Aachen for a print with effigy of Emperor Rudolph II, National Library of Poland and Sadeler's print from 1603, Metropolitan Museum of Art.
- Emperor Rudolf on horseback, with a Battle in the background; after Adriaen de Vries.
- The Emperor Matthias. 1616.
- The Empress Anne, his consort. 1616.
- The Emperor Ferdinand II on horseback; in two sheets. 1629.
- Sigismund III Vasa, 1604
- Sigismund Báthory, Prince of Transilvania.
- Michael the Brave, Prince of Wallachia
- Burkhard von Berlichingen, Privy Counsellor to Rudolf II. 1601.
- Pieter Brueghel the Younger, Painter, of Brussels. 1606.
- Jacob Chimarrhaeus, Grand Almoner.
- Franz von Dietrichstein, Cardinal and Bishop of Olomouc. 1604.
- Christopher Guarinonius Fontanus, Physician to Rudolf II.
- John George Goedelman, Jurisconsult.
- Joachim Huber, Aulic Counsellor.
- Siegfried de Kolonitsch.
- Ferdinand de Kolonitsch.
- Hieronymus Makowsky, gentleman of the privy chamber to Rudolf II. 1603.
- Torquato Tasso, 1617
- Ottavio Strada, Antiquary.
- Adam von Trautmannsdorf
- Maerten de Vos, Painter of Antwerp.
- John Matthew Warenfels, Aulic Counsellor. 1614.

== Various subjects from his own designs ==
- A set of twelve plates, representing Angels with the Instruments of the Passion.
- A set of fifty-two Views near Rome, entitled Vestigi delle Antichita di Roma.
- The Burning of Troy, an etching; 2Eg. Sadeler, fecit, aqua forti.
- Charity, represented by a female figure with three children.
- Narcissus admiring himself in a Fountain.
- Pan and Syrinx.
- St. Sebastian dying, with an Angel drawing out the Arrows from his side.
- St. Dominick receiving the Institution of his Order from St. Peter and St . Paul."
