= Jacob Chimarrhaeus =

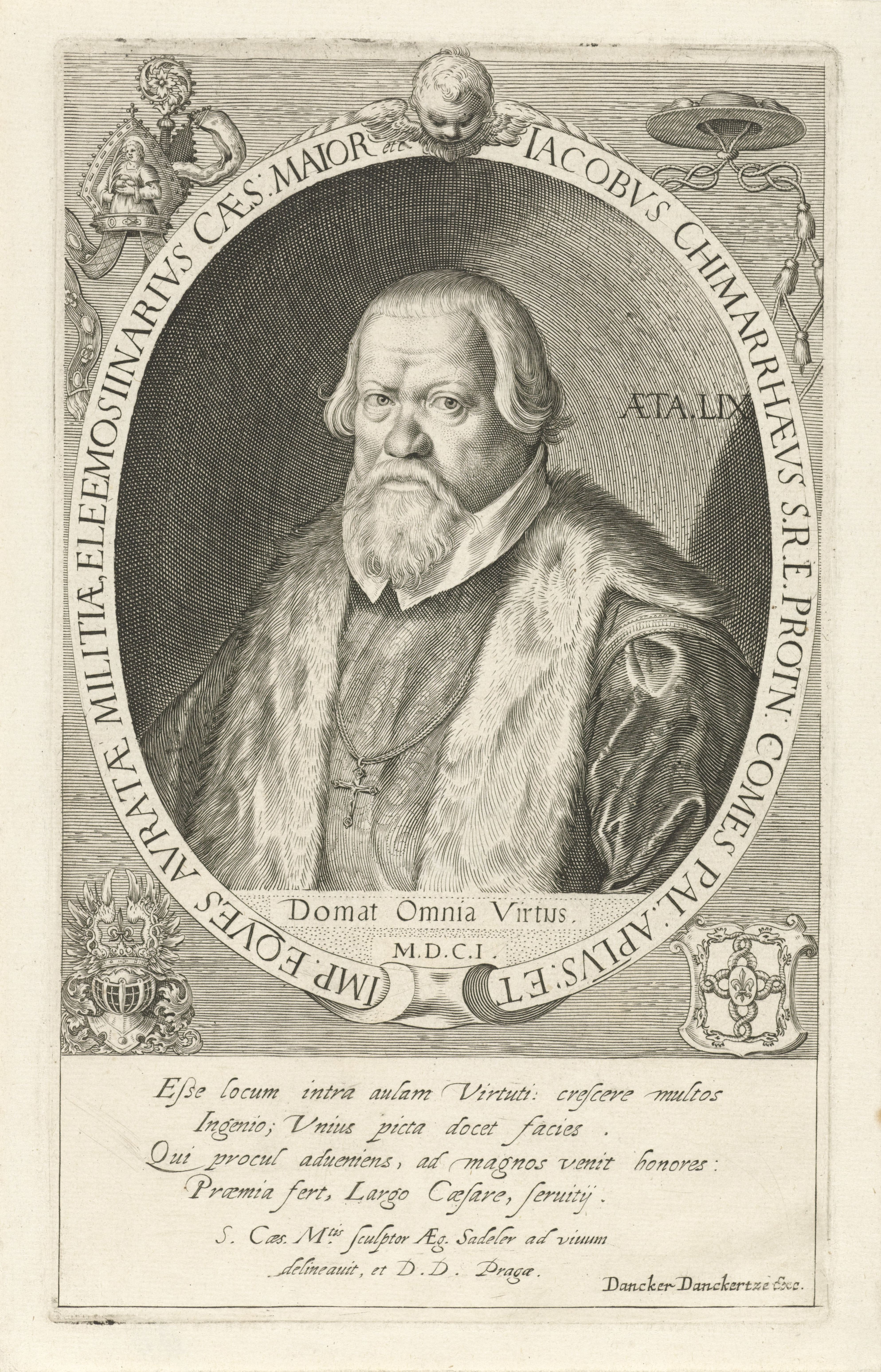
Portrait of Jacob Chimarrhaeus (1601), engraved by Aegidius Sadeler

Jacob Chimarrhaeus (1542–1614) was grand almoner to Holy Roman Emperor Rudolph II.

== Life ==
Chimarrhaeus was a native of Roermond in the duchy of Guelders who became a singer in the court chapel of Rudolph II and was promoted first to chaplain and later to almoner. He was also made a Knight of the Golden Spur and a palatine count of the Holy Roman Empire, and became provost of the Church of St Severin in Cologne. He died in Prague in 1614 but is commemorated in Cologne with a marble and alabaster monument in St Severin carved by Johann in der Müllen.

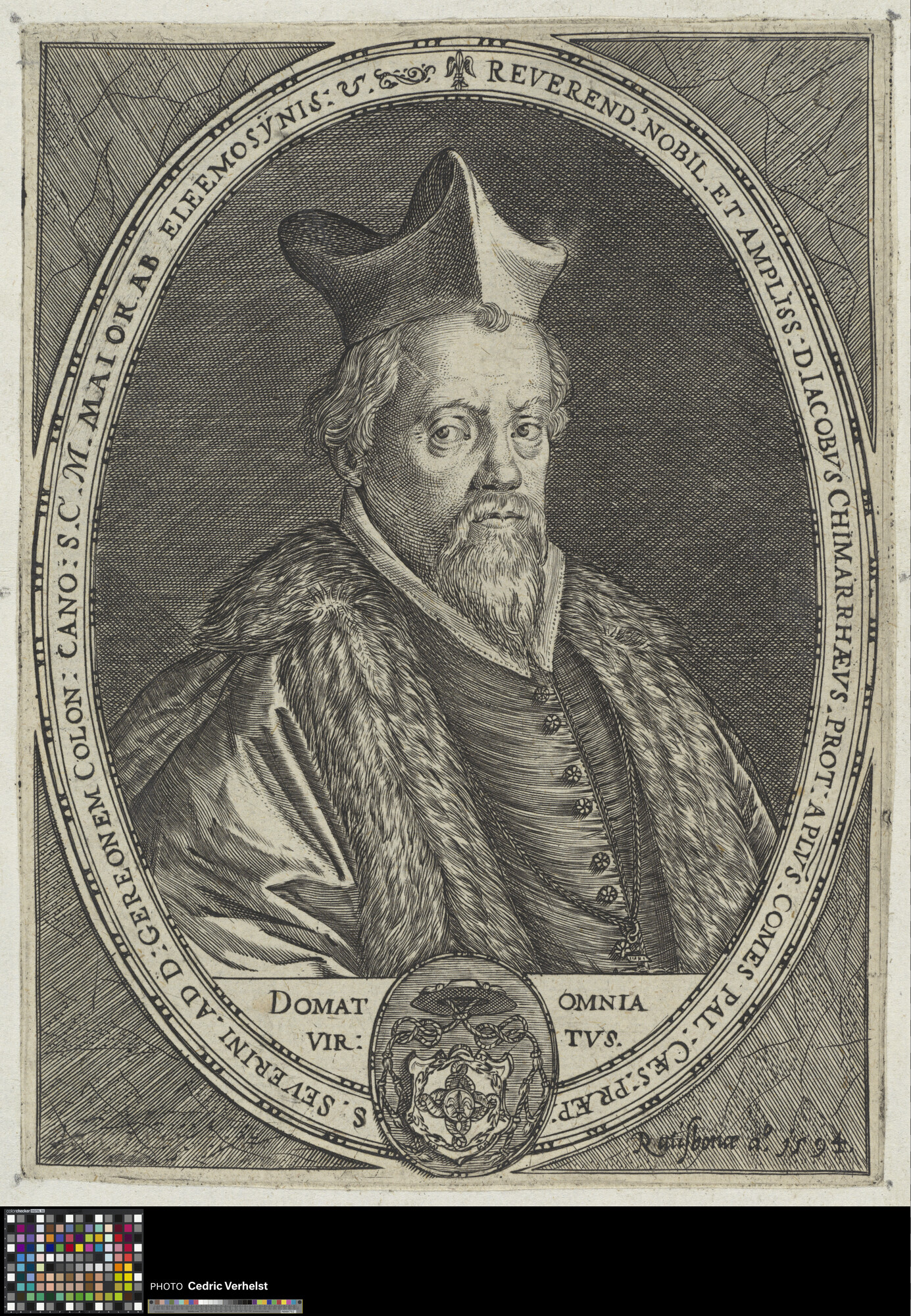
Portrait of Jacob Chimarrhaeus (1594), engraved by Dominicus Custos
