= Christopher Guarinonius Fontanus =

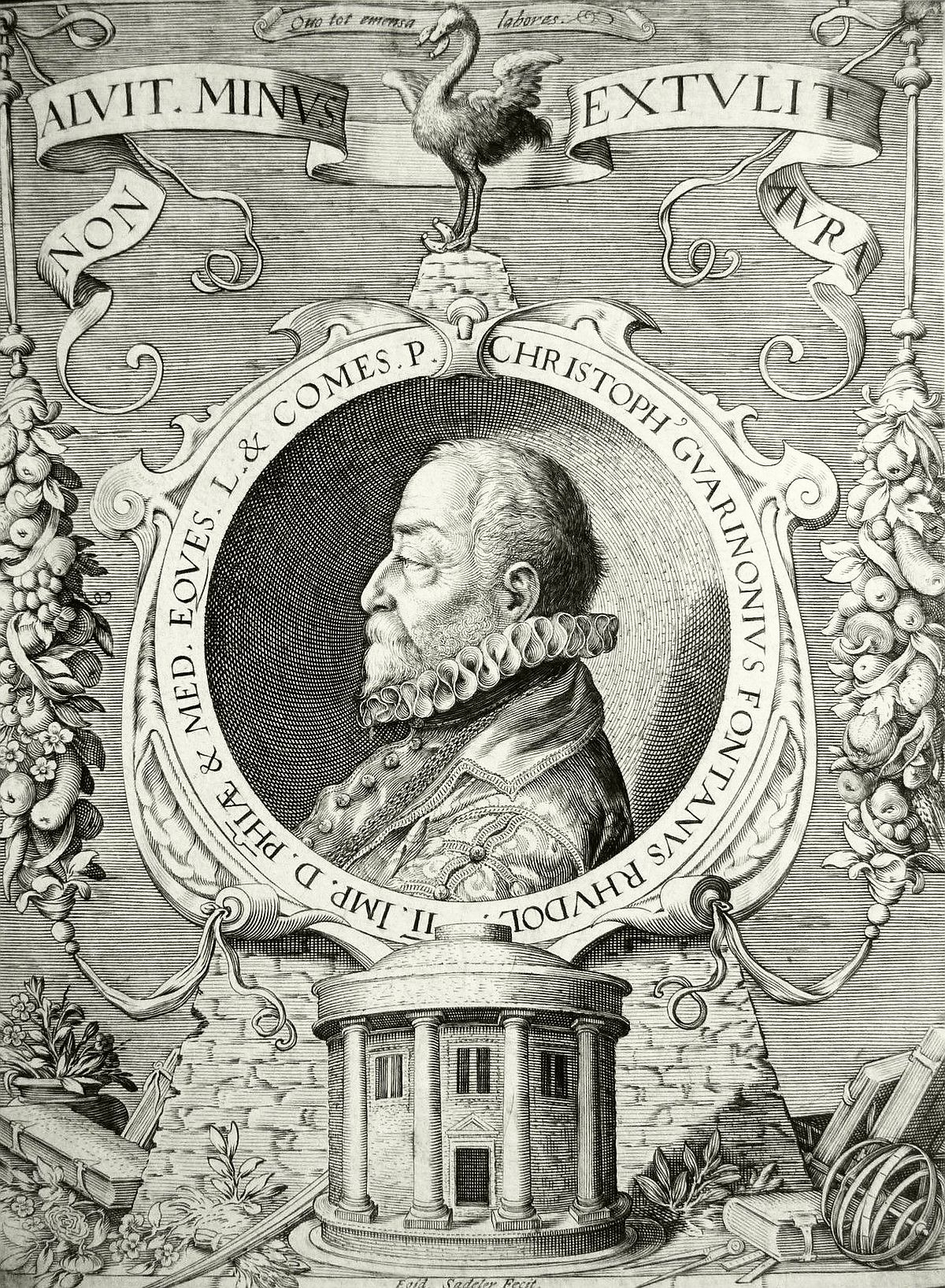
Portrait by Aegidius Sadeler

Christopher Guarinonius or Cristoforo Guarinoni (died 1601) was an Italian physician and naturalist with connections to the courts of the Dukes of Mantua and of the Holy Roman Emperor Rudolph II.

Guarinoni was born in Verona and studied at the University of Padua. Around the year 1600 he was connected to the imperial court in Prague, where his relatives the father and son Bartholomew (1534–1616) and Hippolytus Guarinoni (1571-1654) were active in medicine, philosophy and alchemy.

He wrote three works on Aristotelian natural history and natural philosophy, all of which were published posthumously in Frankfurt within a year of his death.

- Disputatio de methodo doctrinarum ad mentem Aristotelis
- Sententiarum Aristotelis de anima seu mente humana disputatio
- Commentaria in primum librum Aristotelis De historia animalium
