= Hieronymus Makofsky =

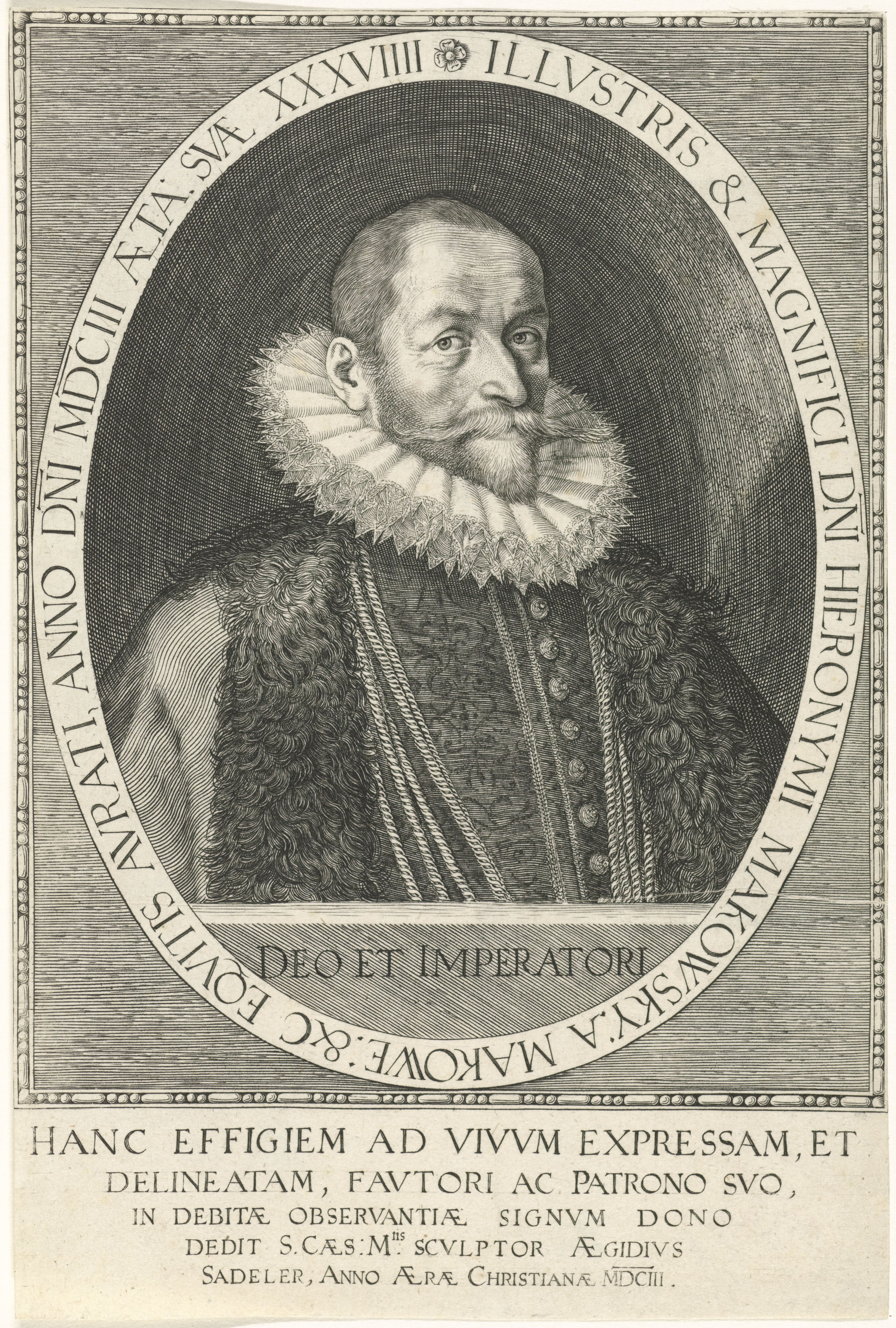
- Portrait of Hieronymus Makowsky (1603), engraved by Aegidius Sadeler
- Born: 1560
- Died: 1630

Hieronymus Makofsky or Makowsky (c. 1565–1630) was a Bohemian knight and a gentleman of the privy chamber to Emperor Rudolph II. He is thought to have had a homoerotic (although not necessarily sexual) relationship with the emperor.

In 1598 he sat in the Bohemian Estates as a member of the knighthood. As a Calvinist, he was thought to have fed the emperor's mistrust of the Capuchins brought to Prague under the leadership of Lawrence of Brindisi. He also dabbled in the occult, and in 1601 it was rumoured that he had used dark arts to bewitch the emperor. In the same year, Rudolph awarded him the hamlet of Vřesce, in the parish of Ratibořice (now part of Ratibořské Hory, Tábor District), and its associated mining rights. In 1603, when he was 38 years old, his portrait was engraved by Aegidius Sadeler.

In 1604 Makofsky was imprisoned in Křivoklát Castle after being accused of neglecting his duties, taking bribes for access to the emperor, intercepting the emperor's letters, betraying the emperor's secrets, and boasting that he held the emperor's life in his hand.

Makofsky died in 1630.
