= Anton Stevens =

Czech painter

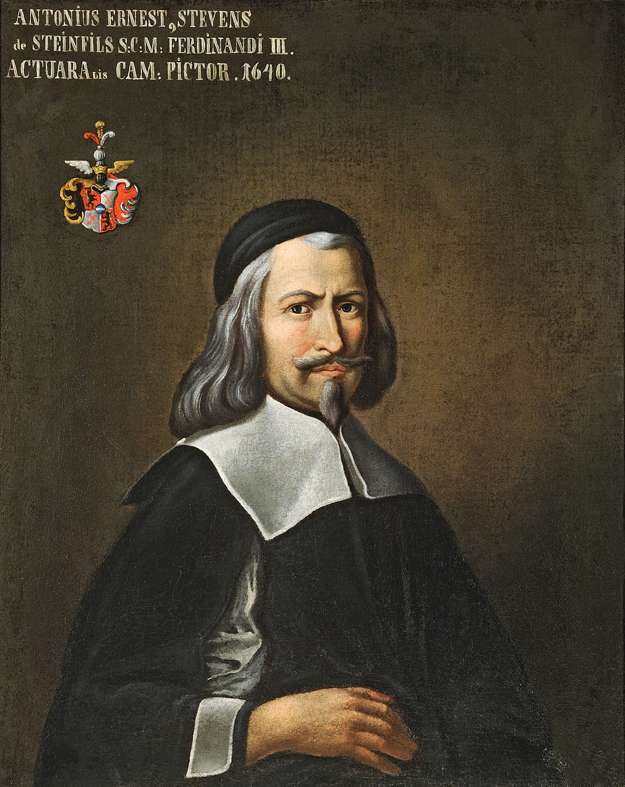
- Self-portrait, around 1670
- Born: c. 1608; Prague, Bohemia, Holy Roman Empire
- Died: c. 1675; Prague, Bohemia
- Education: Pieter Stevens
- Known for: Painting

Anton Stevens (Czech: Antonín Stevens; c. 1608 – c. 1675) was a Czech painter. Besides Karel Škréta, he was another important promoter of early Baroque painting in the Kingdom of Bohemia.

== Life ==
Anton Stevens, born in Prague, mastered the basics of the painting craft with his father, the Rudolfine landscape painter Pieter Stevens (perhaps 1567 – after 1626), who had settled in the city by 1590. In 1629–1635, the young Stevens made a study trip abroad (probably Spanish Netherlands and Germany; in 1635, he was again in Prague, where the Augustinian Hermits at St. Thomas Church in Lesser Town (Malá Strana) became his first clients. Soon afterward, he portrayed Emperor Ferdinand III and in 1640 he was in Vienna, where Prince Gundaker of Liechtenstein tried to win his services. In 1643, he was ennobled by Count Jaroslav Bořita of Martinice, who granted him the predicate von Steinfels and a family coat-of-arms.

== Career ==
His work is extensive, he painted for a long time for the Strahov Monastery and it is the creator of a number of altarpieces in Prague churches and in the countryside (Augustinian Hermit's monastery in Bělá pod Bezdězem, the dean church in Žatec), also portraits, landscape paintings, murals as well as designs of these prints. He was a member of Prague Old Town's painters' guild and for a certain time was the head of its branch in Lesser Town. Stevens drew inspiration from Flemish painting, explicit responses to the work of Peter Paul Rubens are discernible in his figural style; graphic reproductions of masterpieces by prominent Flemish and Italian artists play an important role in his compositions. In the production of his two sons, Paul Anton and Johann Jakob (1651–1730), the painting dynasty, coming from Mechelen in Belgium, continued into a fourth generation.

== Gallery ==
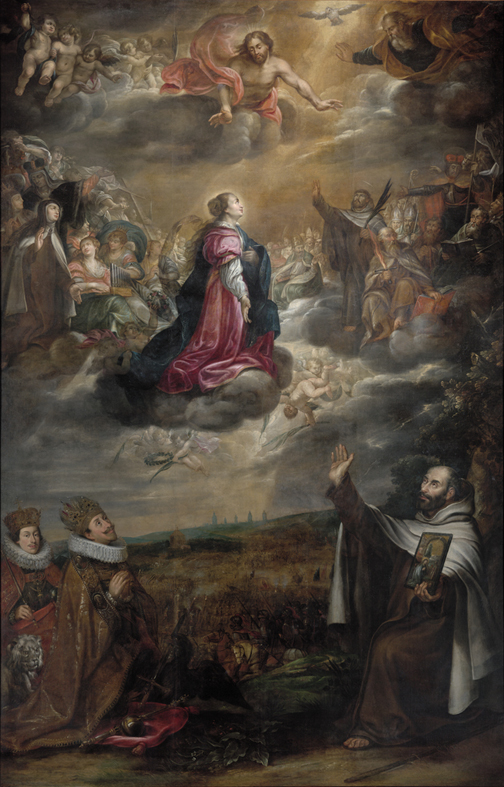
The painting of Our Lady interceding at Holy Trinity for the victory of the Catholic army at the Battle of White Mountain by Anton Stevens from the main altar at the Church of Our Lady of Victory at the Lesser Quarter of Prague from 1641

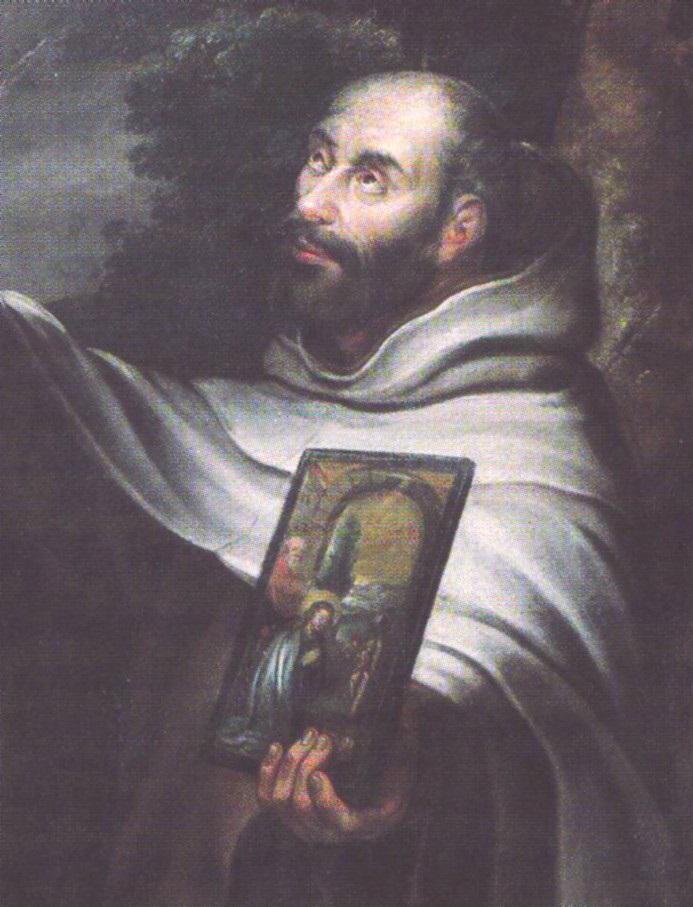
Detail of Stevens picture of Our Lady Victorious from Church of Virgin Mary Victorious in Lesser Quarter of Prague from 1641

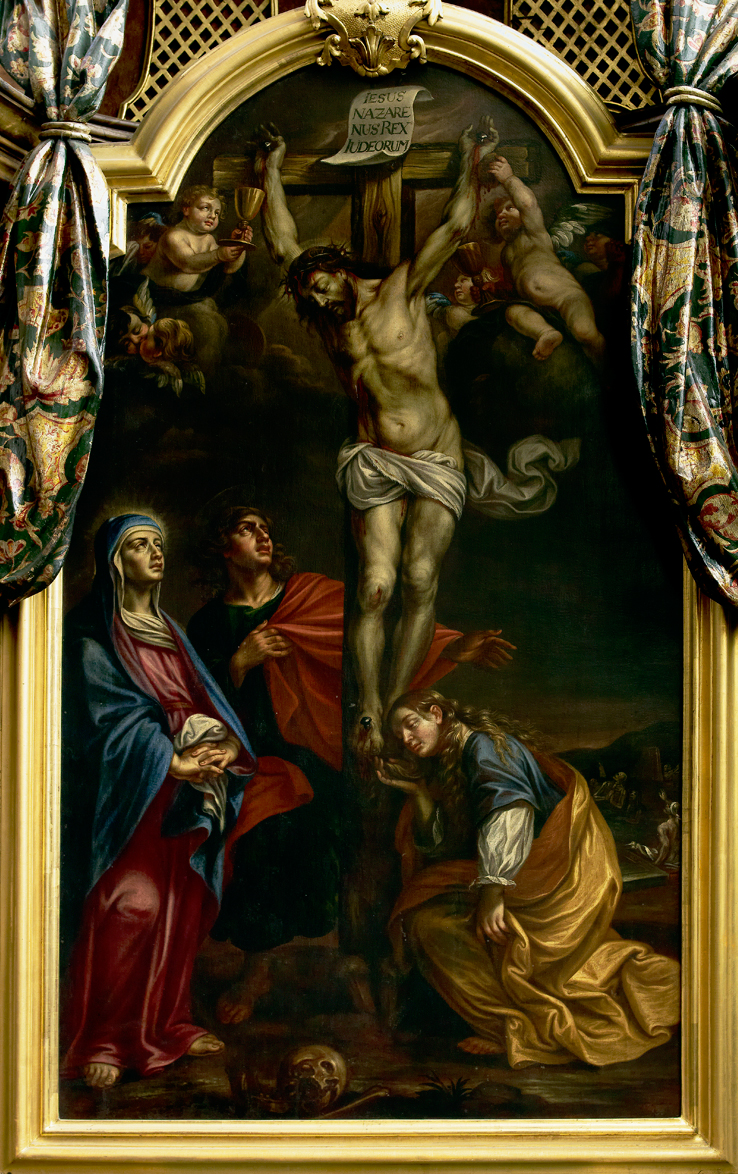
Anton Stevens, Crucifixion in the Church of St. Tomas in the Lesser Quarter of Prague from 1656

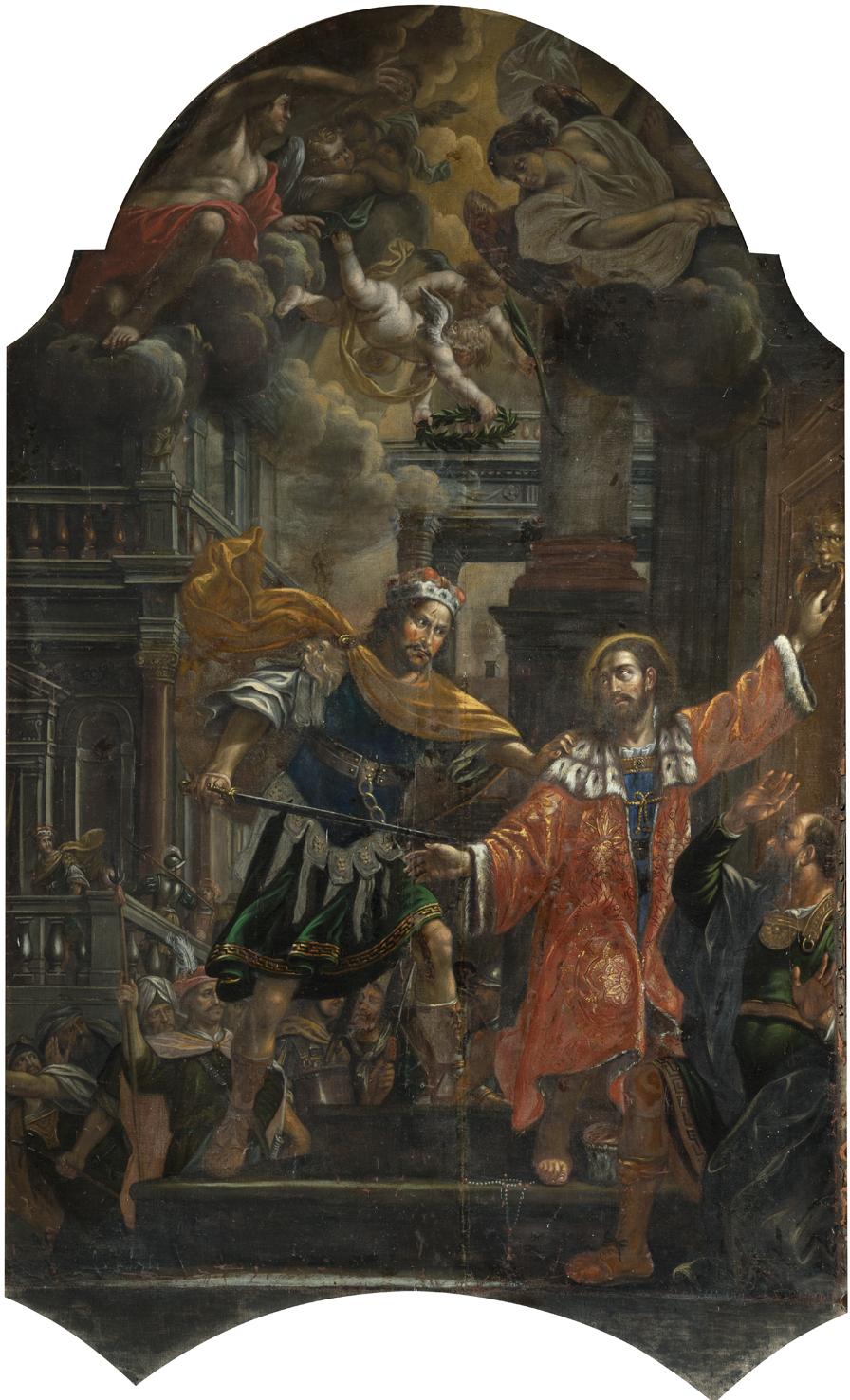
Anton Stevens, Martyrdom of St. Wenceslas from 1666, Bělá pod Bezdězem, the Church of St. Wenceslas

== Bibliography ==
- Štěpán Vácha and Radka Heisslerová, Ve stínu Karla Škréty. Pražští malíři v letech 1635–1680. Antonín Stevens, Jan Bedřich Hess, Matěj Zimprecht [= In the Shadow of Karel Škréta. Prague Painters in 1635–1680. Anton Stevens, Johann Friedrich Hess, Matthias Zimprecht]. Prague: Academia, 2017. ISBN 978-80-200-2801-3
- Štěpán Vácha: Der Prager Maler Anton Stevens im Dienst des Fürsten Gundaker von Liechtenstein. In: Die Liechtenstein und die Kunst, ed. by Liechtensteinisch-Tschechische Historikerkomission (= Veröffentlichungen der Liechtensteinisch-Tschechischen Historikerkomission 3), Vaduz: hvfl, 2014, pp. 185–200. ISBN 978-3-906393-72-8
- Štěpán Vácha: Karel Škréta and Anton Stevens. In: Lenka Stolárová – Vít Vlnas (eds.), Karel Škréta (1610–1674): His Work and His Era (Exh. Cat.), National Gallery in Prague, 2010, pp. 453–473. ISBN 978-80-7035-459-9
