= Anselmus de Boodt =

Belgian physician and gemologist

- Aegidius Sadeler, Engraved Portrait of Anselmus Boetius De Boodt (c. 1600)
- Born: 1550, Bruges
- Died: 1632, Bruges
- Scientific career
- Fields: physician, gemologist, naturalist, writer, draughtsman

Anselmus Boetius de Boodt (1550–1632) was a Renaissance humanist naturalist and gemologist from the County of Flanders in the Habsburg Netherlands. He was appointed court and personal physician to Emperor Rudolf II. Together with the mineralogist Georgius Agricola, De Boodt is considered a founding figure of modern gemology. De Boodt was an avid collector of gems and minerals who travelled widely to various mining regions in the Low Countries, Germany, Bohemia and Silesia to collect samples. His definitive work on the subject was the Gemmarum et Lapidum Historia (1609).

De Boodt was a draughtsman who made many natural history illustrations and developed a natural history taxonomy.

== Life ==
De Boodt was born in Bruges in 1550, to an aristocratic family originating in 13th-century Dordrecht. His father, Anselmus de Boodt (1519-1587), was a renowned broker who also provided overseas insurance coverage.

=== Education ===
De Boodt studied the Liberal Arts at the University of Louvain from 1567. In 1573 he was at the University of Douai, and on 28 November 1575 he graduated licentiate of canon and civil law at the University of Orléans. He then went on a tour of Italy, briefly studying in Padua in 1576, and visiting Venice, Rome, Florence, Milan and Bologna. In January 1579 he matriculated at the University of Heidelberg, where Thomas Erastus, whom he later named as one of his teachers, was lecturing on medicine and pharmacology.

De Boodt returned to Bruges in the course of 1579 and was appointed pensionary to the city council, but after only a few months had to flee the city when rebel forces in the Dutch Revolt seized power.

=== At the imperial court ===
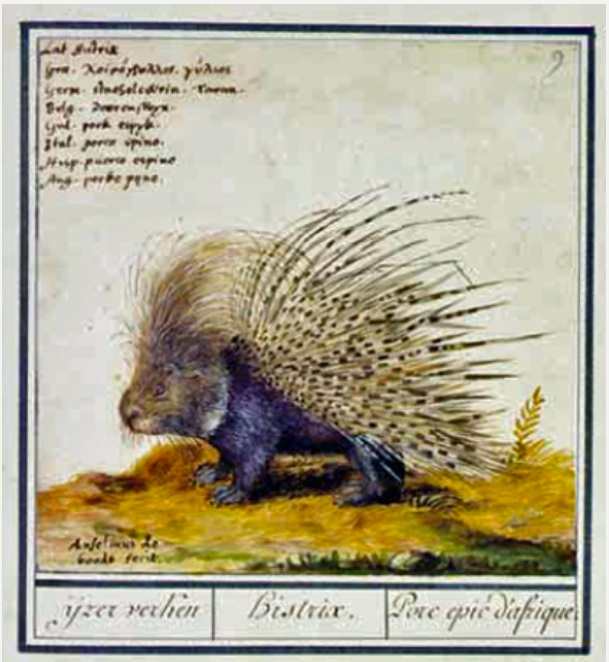
IJzerverken, drawing by Anselmus de Boodt

De Boodt went to Bohemia, where in 1583 he was appointed the personal physician of William of Rosenberg, a holder of high office who was an important patron of the arts and sciences. Rosenberg, who ran the government of Bohemia on behalf of Emperor Rudolf II, divided his time between Prague Castle and his own estate of Český Krumlov Castle in southern Bohemia.

From 1584 to 1595 De Boodt held a canonry of St. Donat's Church in Bruges, but was an absentee throughout his tenure. In 1586 he returned to Padua to continue his study of medicine, obtaining a doctorate in medicine the next year. In 1587, when the Flemish doctor and pioneering botanist Carolus Clusius left the imperial botanical garden in Prague, de Boodt took over his position, and was also appointed physician to the imperial court.

De Boodt thenceforward directed his studies towards the medical field, in which he gained pre-eminence. In Le Parfaict Joaillier, the word illness is used nearly sixty times, ills twenty times, ill twenty-five times; the word "physician", always in capital letters, whether singular or plural, is used twenty-five times for the purposes of certification of medical facts.

In January 1604, De Boodt, was appointed advisor and personal physician to the emperor, with a stipend of 40 florins. Aegidius Sadeler's portrait of him gives his title as Rodolphi II Roman. Imperatoris cubicularius medicus (medic to the bedchamber of Roman Emperor Rudolf II). He retained this title and this function until Rudolf's death, as evidenced by all the title pages of his works.

The publication of the Gemmarum et Lapidum Historia ensured de Boodt's European reputation and he could afford to live in luxury. He decided to leave the imperial court after the death of Rudolf II in 1612.

=== Return to Bruges ===
He returned to Bruges in 1614. Here he remained active as a physician, painted, and performed songs from his own Luteboec (Book of the Lute) on string instruments. He composed various literary works in his native Dutch as a member of the local Chamber of Rhetoric. He translated the Consolatione Philosophiae of Boethius into Dutch verse and for the youth he composed "spiritual songs", prayers and medications in teh collections De Baene des Deugds ("The Way of Virtue"), published in Antwerp in 1624, and De Baene des Hemels ende der Deughden ("The Way of Heaven and the Virtues"), published in Bruges by Nicolaes Breyghel in 1628.

He compiled the first herbal book in Bruges with sixty plates, published posthumously by his young friend Olivier de Wree in 1640 under the title Anselmi Boëtii de Boot I.C. Brugensis & Rodolphi II. imp. Roman. medici a cubiculis florum, herbarum, ac fructuum selectiorum icones, & vires pleraeq. hactenus ignotae.

De Boodt died in Bruges on 21 June 1632.

== Works ==
De Boodt prepared a Theatrum Instrumentarum Mechanicorum for Emperor Rudolph II (unpublished), which described a wide range of scientific instruments. In 1588, De Boodt obtained an engraving licence in order to complete the third part of the Last Judgement of court engraver Martino Rota, who had died in 1583.

When the Flemish court historian Jacobus Typotius died after completing the second part of his Symbola Divina et Humana, a collection of emblems and imprese (the first volume had appeared in Prague with engravings by Sadeler), De Boodt completed the third and most voluminous part. The book appeared in 1603 and was reprinted at least 10 times up to 1972 (Academia, Graz).

=== Natural history studies ===
De Boodt also made many watercolours of native and exotic animals and plants. He filled twelve volumes with 728 illustrations of quadrupeds, reptiles, birds, fish, insects and plants. His aim was to depict all the creatures of the natural world just as his compatriot Joris Hoefnagel had earlier done in his series of the Four Elements.

He developed a taxonomy and standardisation, which he added in many languages to his drawings. These drawings predate the Academy of the Lynxes around Galileo Galilei for which usually primacy of such material is claimed. De Boodt made most of the drawings himself but also engaged the services of other artists such as Elias Verhulst from Mechelen. This Historia Naturalis remained in the hands of his heirs until 1844 and was partially published in 1989 as De Albums van Anselmus De Boodt, edited by M.C. Maselis, A. Balis, and R. Marynissen (Tielt, Lannoo, 1999).

=== Gemological studies ===
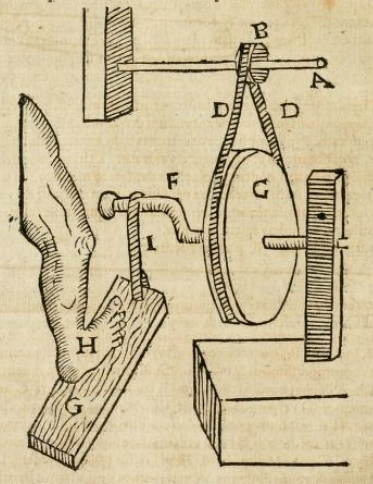
Instrument for cutting stones, on page 56 of the Gemmarum et Lapidum Historia

De Boodt's principal assignment was the study and cataloguing of all known gems, rocks and minerals. He summarized his work in the Gemmarum et Lapidum Historia (The History of Gems and Stones), the finest treatise and encyclopedia of gemology for this time. The first edition appeared in 1609 and was dedicated to the emperor. It was published in Latin in Hanau (Germany). Two further Latin editions were published in Leiden (Dutch Republic) in 1636 and in 1647. These were organized by a physician of Leiden, Adriaan Toll, a commentator of the works of Galenus. The book was translated into French in 1644 as Le Parfaict Jouaillier ou Histoire des Pierreries.

The book was used for many centuries for its information on the splitting of diamonds, how to recognise fake gems, colour-fast mixes for painters, exploration sites for geologists, the hardness of rocks and the health benefits of certain minerals.

The first part of the book gives an account of the various causes of minerals. De Boodt's views on this were influenced by earlier scholastic authors and the Greek philosopher Aristotle. He was still able to arrive at a unique account for the causes of the formation of minerals and several of his ideas became well accepted throughout the seventeenth century. The book contains important contributions to the theory of colour.

=== Select bibliography ===
- Gemmarum et lapidum historia : qua non solum ortus, natura, vis & precium, sed etiam modus quo ex iis olea, salia, tincturae, essentiae, arcana & magisteria arte chymica confici possint, ostenditur : opvs principibvs, medicis, chymicis, physicis, ac liberalioribus ingeniis vtilissimum : cum variis figuris, indiceq. duplici & copioso, Anselmus Boetius de Boot, Hanoviae, Typ. Wechelianis apud C. Marnium et heredes J. Aubrii, 1609
- Le Parfaict joaillier ou l'histoire des pierreries, Ans. Boece de Boot, Lyon, Huguetan, 1644
- Gemmarum et lapidum historia : quam olim edidit Anselmus Boetius de Boot ... / Postea Adrianus Tollius ... recensuit; figuris melioribus, & commentariis pluribus illustravit, & indice auxit multo locupletiore, de Boodt Anselmus Boëtius 1550–1632. -- Tollius Adrianus, 17th century, ed. -- De Laet Joannes 1581-1649—Theophrastus 372-287 BC, Lugduni Batavorum, ex officina Ioannis Maire, 1647.
- Florum, herbarum, ac fructuum selectiorum icones, & vires pleraeq. hactenus ignotae, 1640
- Symbola Diuina & Humana Pontificvm Imperatorvm Regvm. Accessit breuis, & facilis Isagoge Iac. Typotii. Ex Mvsaeo Octavii De Strada. 3. Symbola Varia Diversorvm Principvm. Cvm Facili Isagoge D. Anselmi De Boodt Brvgensis Sac. Caes. Malavlae Medici, Francofvrti: Schönwetter; 1652
