= Burkhard von Berlichingen =

German politician (c. 1550–1623)

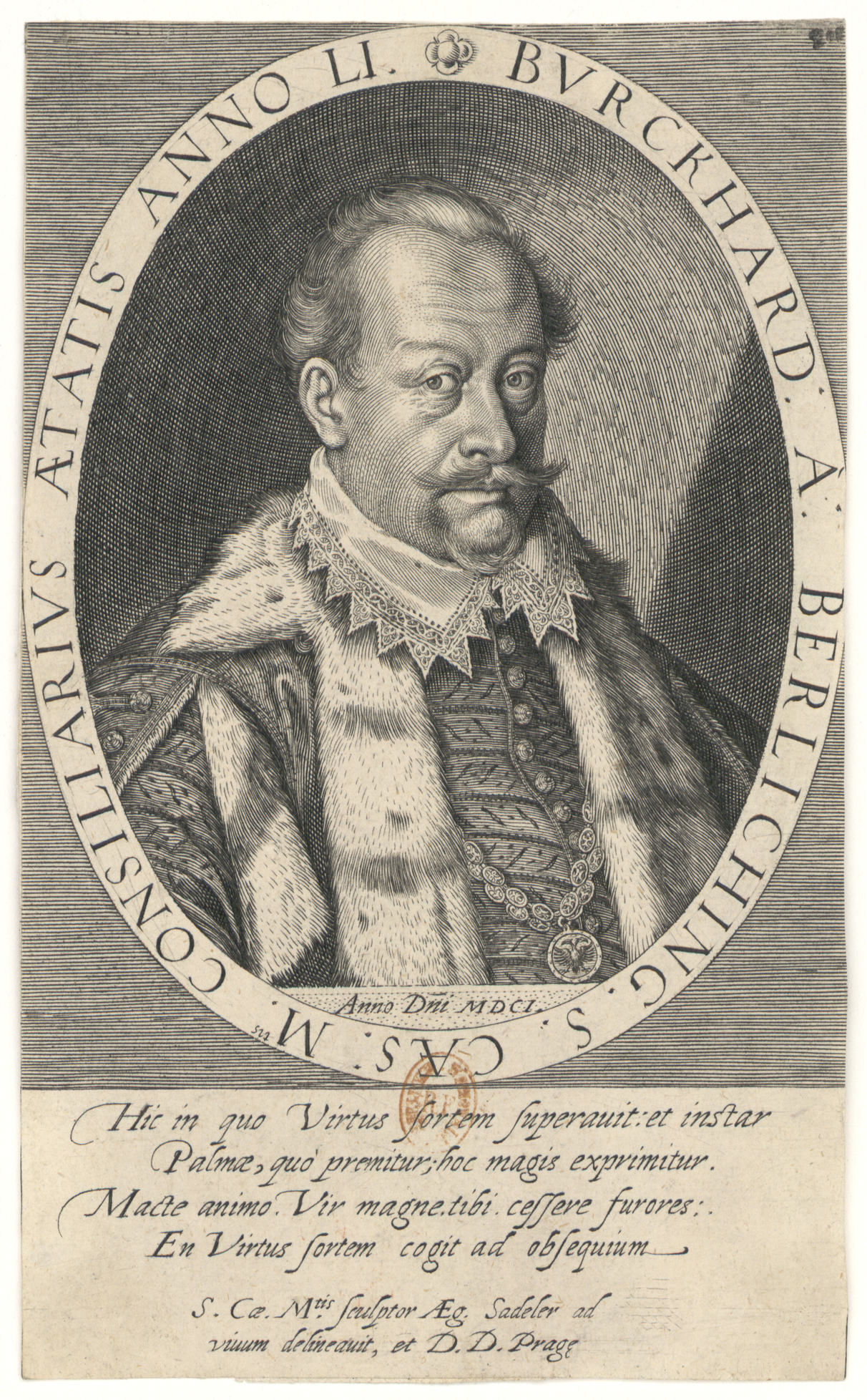
Portrait of Burkhard von Berlichingen in his 51st year, engraved by Aegidius Sadeler (1601)

Burkhard von Berlichingen (c.1550–1623) was an imperial councillor at the court of Holy Roman Emperor Rudolph II.

Berlichingen became court councillor of Württemberg in 1579, chancery councillor in 1586, and in 1588 was sent to the imperial court in Prague, where he became imperial councillor. In 1597, he built the north wing of Filseck Castle.

On 25 June 1613, he was condemned to public humiliation and five years imprisonment in Křivoklát Castle for libeling the honour of the Schlick family in pasquils directed at Magdalena Schlick, Countess of Passaun and Weißkirchen.
