= Jacobus Typotius =

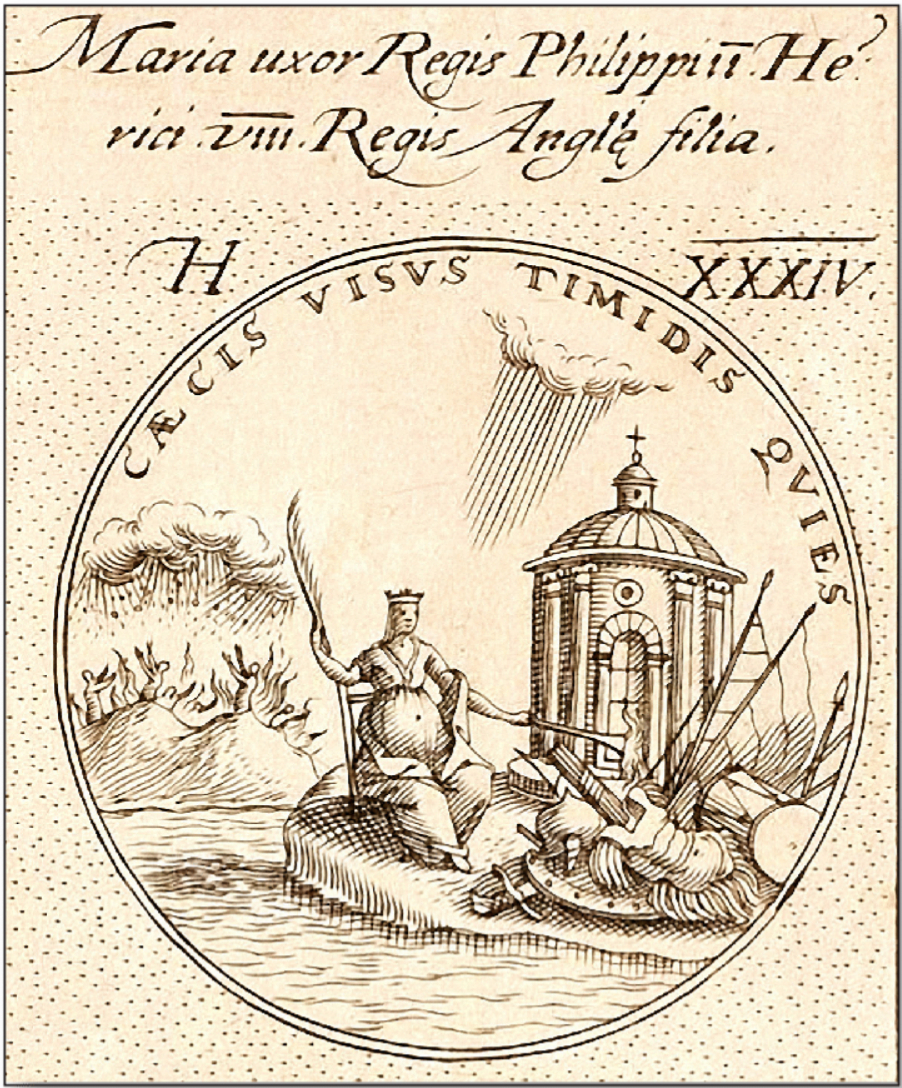
Device of Mary I of England from Symbola Divina & Humana

Jacobus Typotius (1540–1601) was a Flemish humanist, a native of Diest in Brabant, who became court historian to the Emperor Rudolph II. He is now known for his association with the influential collection of emblems and imprese (an emblem book), the Symbola divina et humana which was published first in Prague, in three volumes, from 1601.

While this work is sometimes attributed solely to Typotius, it was seen into print by Anselmus de Boodt, with others. The engravings were by Aegidius Sadeler.
