= Sadeler family =

Dynasty of Flemish engravers

Aegidius Sadeler, in Het Gulden Cabinet

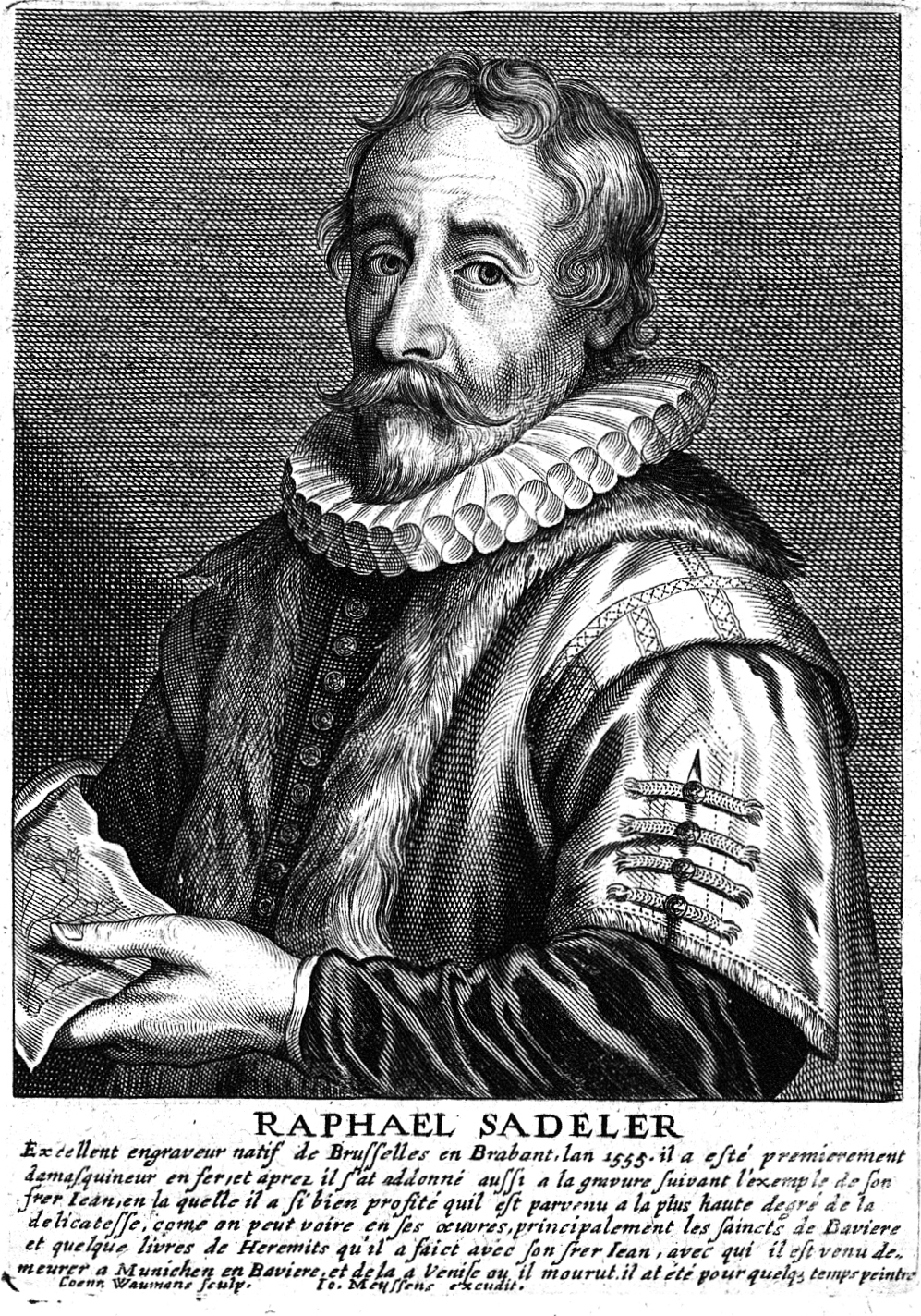
Raphael Sadeler, in Het Gulden Cabinet

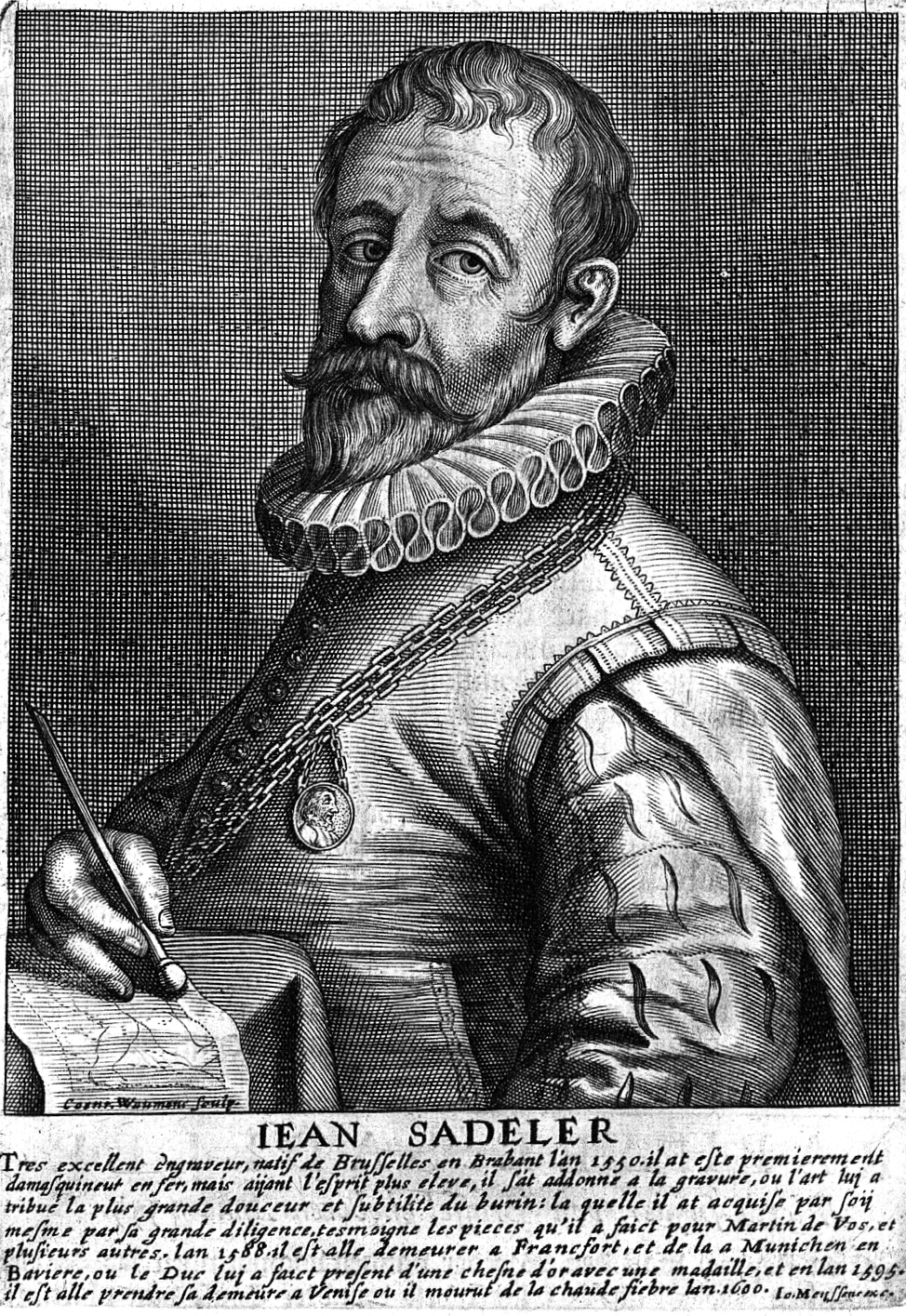
Jan Sadeler, in Het Gulden Cabinet

The Sadeler family were the largest, and probably the most successful of the dynasties of Flemish engravers that were dominant in Northern European printmaking in the later 16th and 17th centuries, as both artists and publishers. As with other dynasties such as the Wierixes and Van de Passe family, the style of family members is very similar. Their work often hard to tell apart in the absence of a signature or date, or evidence of location. Altogether at least ten Sadelers worked as engravers, in the Spanish Netherlands, Germany, Italy, Bohemia and Austria.

Much of their best work was high quality reproductive prints of contemporary artists such as Bartholomeus Spranger (Aegidius II) or the Venetian Bassano family (Jan I and Rafael I), that were important in spreading the reputation and style of these artists.

== The family ==
The Sadelers were descended from "chasers," engravers of armour, from Aalst. Jan de Saeyelleer or Sadeleer had three sons, all usually called "Sadeler": Jan I (1550 Brussels - 1600 Brussels or possibly Venice), Aegidius I (c. 1555 Brussels - c. 1609 Frankfurt am Main) and Rafael I (1560/61 Antwerp - 1628 or 1632). Another Sadeler, Marcus or Marco, was a printer and perhaps publisher who was working in Haarlem in c. 1586–87, and is presumed to be a member of the family, though it is not known where he fits in.

Jan I was the father of Justus (ca. 1572 Antwerp - c. 1620) and Marcus Christoph (b. Munich, active 1614 to after 1650). Aegidius I was the father of Aegidius II (c. 1570 Antwerp - 1629 Prague). Rafael I was the father of Rafael II (1584 - 1627 or 1632, both Antwerp), Jan II (c. 1588 - 1665 or later) and Filips (c. 1600, active to 1650). Aegidius II was the father of Tobias, who was active from 1670 to 1675 in Vienna.

== Jan Sadeler I and Rafael I ==
Jan was in Antwerp by 1572; it was then the centre of the printmaking world, with hugely productive workshops producing work for publishers with excellent distribution arrangements throughout Europe. In that year he became a master of the artists' Guild of Saint Luke, and married in Antwerp Cathedral. By 1569 or 1570, he was working for the publisher Christopher Plantin. His younger brother Rafael I joined him there, and they continued to work closely together, moving to Cologne in about 1579, but continuing to visit Antwerp. The disruptions of the Dutch Revolt scattered all the Antwerp artists across Northern Europe, and after the siege of Antwerp in 1585 Jan and Rafael worked in several German cities - Mainz, Frankfurt-am-main, and Munich without settling for long, before they went to Italy in 1593, where Jan may have died. They first went, accompanied by their nephew Aegidius II, to Verona, then Venice from 1596/7, where they had a shop. In 1604 Rafael returned to Munich, where he remained for most of the rest of his life, of which the last record came in 1622. Jan's son Marcus, or Marco, remained in Italy as a publisher and artist, though there may be confusion between his work and that of his presumed relation the older Marcus.

Three of their best-known prints after the Bassani are known as the "Sadeler kitchen scenes". They show respectively Christ in the house of Mary and Martha, at Emmaus, and Dives and Lazarus. Jan’s testament, drafted on 17 August 1600 and today in the Archivio di Stato in Venice, gave specific instructions to his son Justus for the administration of both his family and business and, among other things, required him to compile an inventory of the copperplates in the shop. Long believed lost, the inventory of the Venetian printing shop as drawn up on 20 November 1600 has recently resurfaced in the Archivio di Stato di Venezia. It reveals that upon Jan’s death the Sadeler shop contained 475 copperplates; 368 of which were the sole property of Jan, with the remaining 107 jointly owned by Jan and his brother Aegidius. The stock was dispersed after the death of Jan’s heir, Justus, in 1620

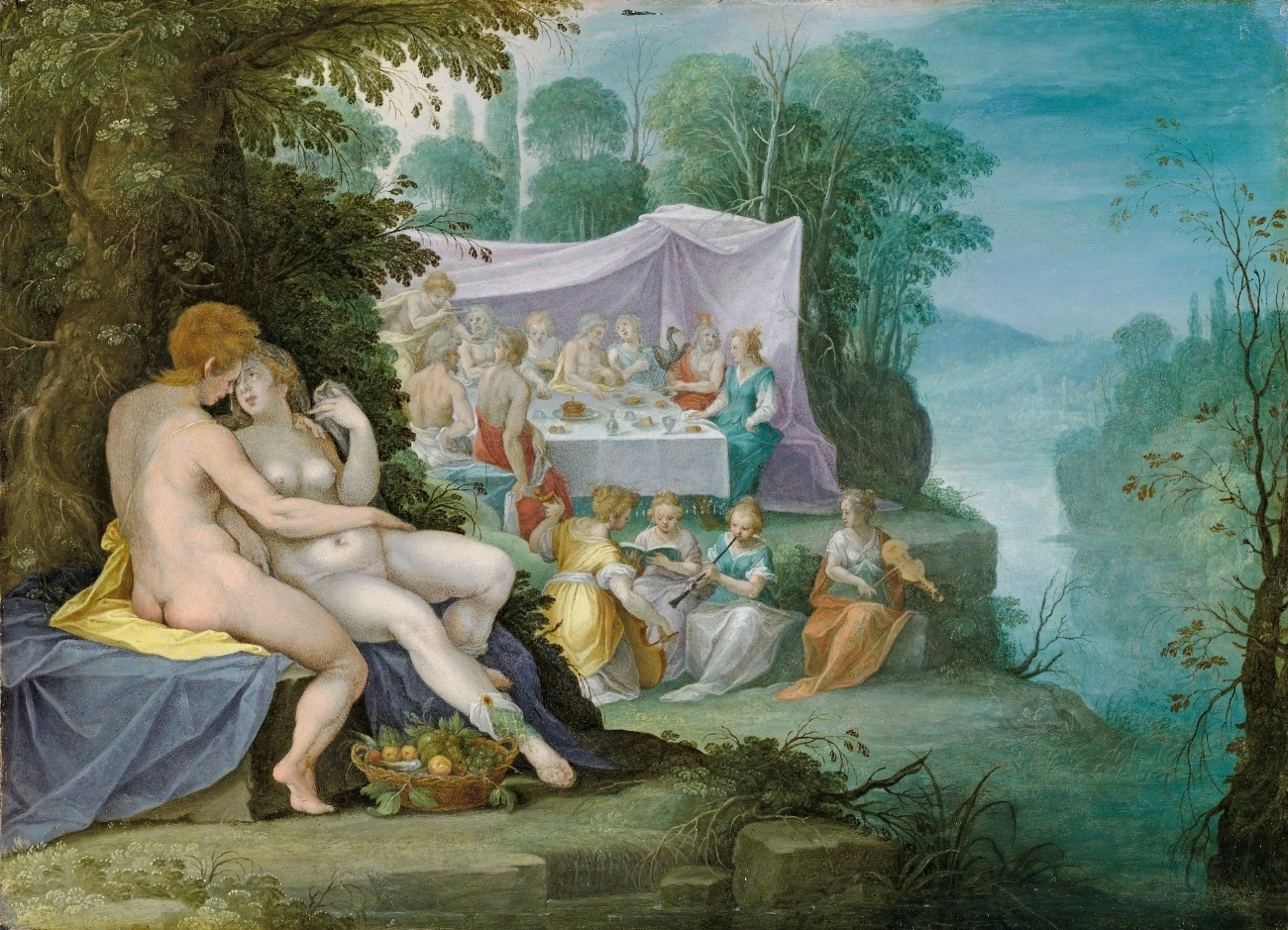
The marriage of Peleus and Thetis, Jan Sadeler, c. 1580–1600

== Aegidius Sadeler II ==
Aegidius Sadeler (sometimes written Egidius, or Gilles) was also a painter, and a leading Northern Mannerist engraver; the best of the dynasty. After moving to Cologne in childhood (c. 1579), then Munich (c. 1588), he trained in Antwerp, and went to Italy, working in Rome (1593), then back to Munich with his uncles Jan and Rafael in 1594, travelling with them to Verona, and probably Venice (1595–97). After a trip (apparently alone) to Naples he moved to Prague in 1597, where spent the rest of his life, mostly employed by Emperor Rudolf II. He lived for some time in the house of Bartholomeus Spranger, whose works he engraved. As the more important figure, references to just Aegidius Sadeler are more likely to mean him than his father.

He sold prints from a stall in the Vladislav Hall in Prague Castle, shown in a well-known engraving of his (1607), and his prints after Spranger, Roelant Savery and other Prague artists were important in disseminating the style of Rudolfine Mannerism across Europe, especially Germany and the Netherlands. He also painted, although no works certainly by him survive.

His early works were mostly religious prints after Northern painters, several in sets. In Italy he added Northern painters working in Italy, such as Paul Bril and Denys Calvaert, as well as Italian masters both some generations older (Titian, Raphael, Parmigianino, and contemporary (Tintoretto, Barocci). In Prague he engraved the Mannerists of Rudolf's court, but also did many portraits of notables, and engraved many of the Dürer drawings in the Imperial collection. He collaborated with Jacobus Typotius on the Prague emblem book, Symbola Divina et Humana.

== Gallery ==
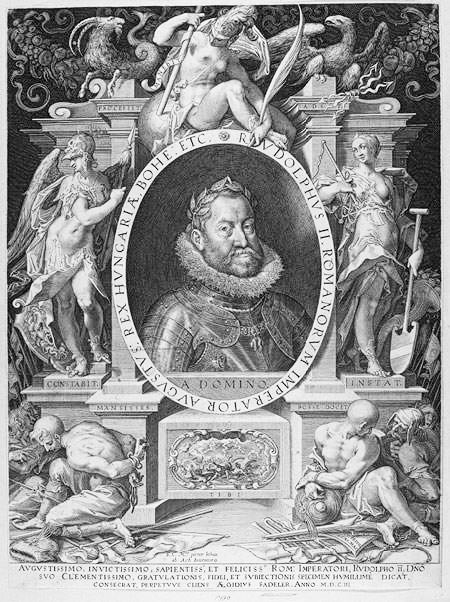
Engraving of Rudolf II by Aegidius Sadeler II (1603).

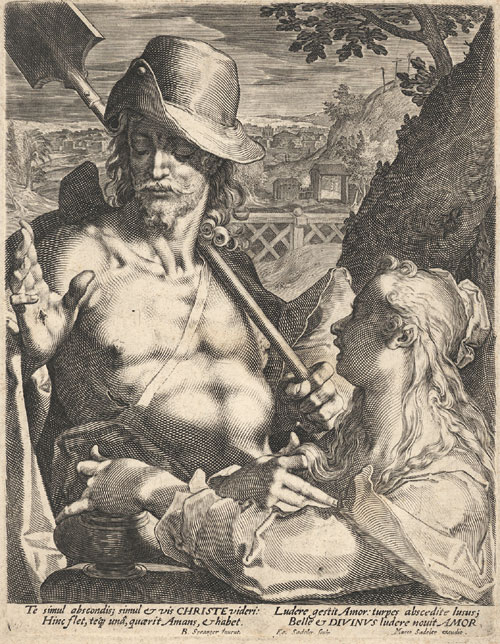
Christ and Mary Magdalene in the garden. Aegidius Sadeler II, engraving after Bartholomeus Spranger

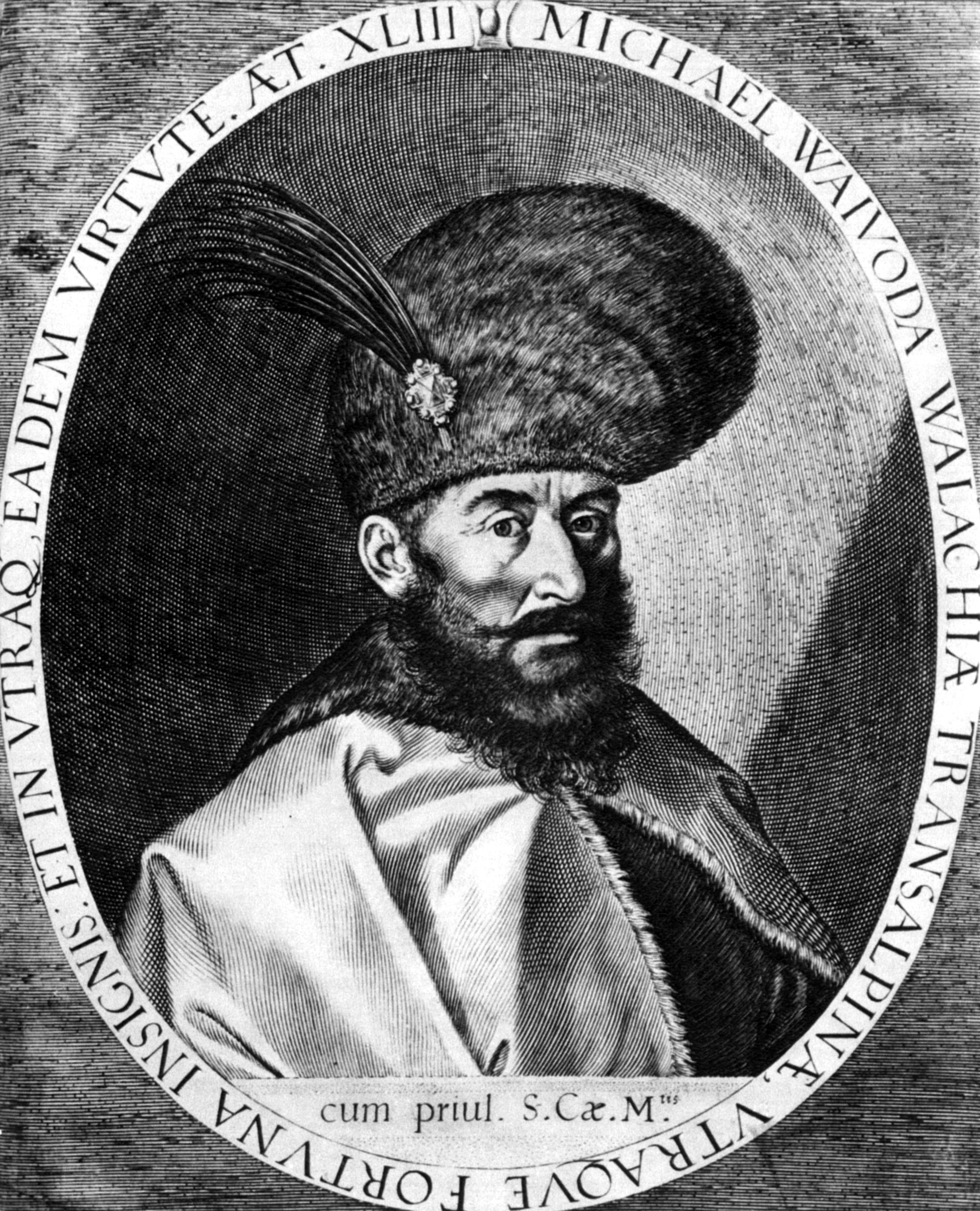
Portrait of Michael the Brave, made by Aegidius Sadeler II
