= Livonian campaign of Stephen Báthory =

1577–82 Polish–Lithuanian offensive against Russia during the Livonian War

- Part of the Livonian War
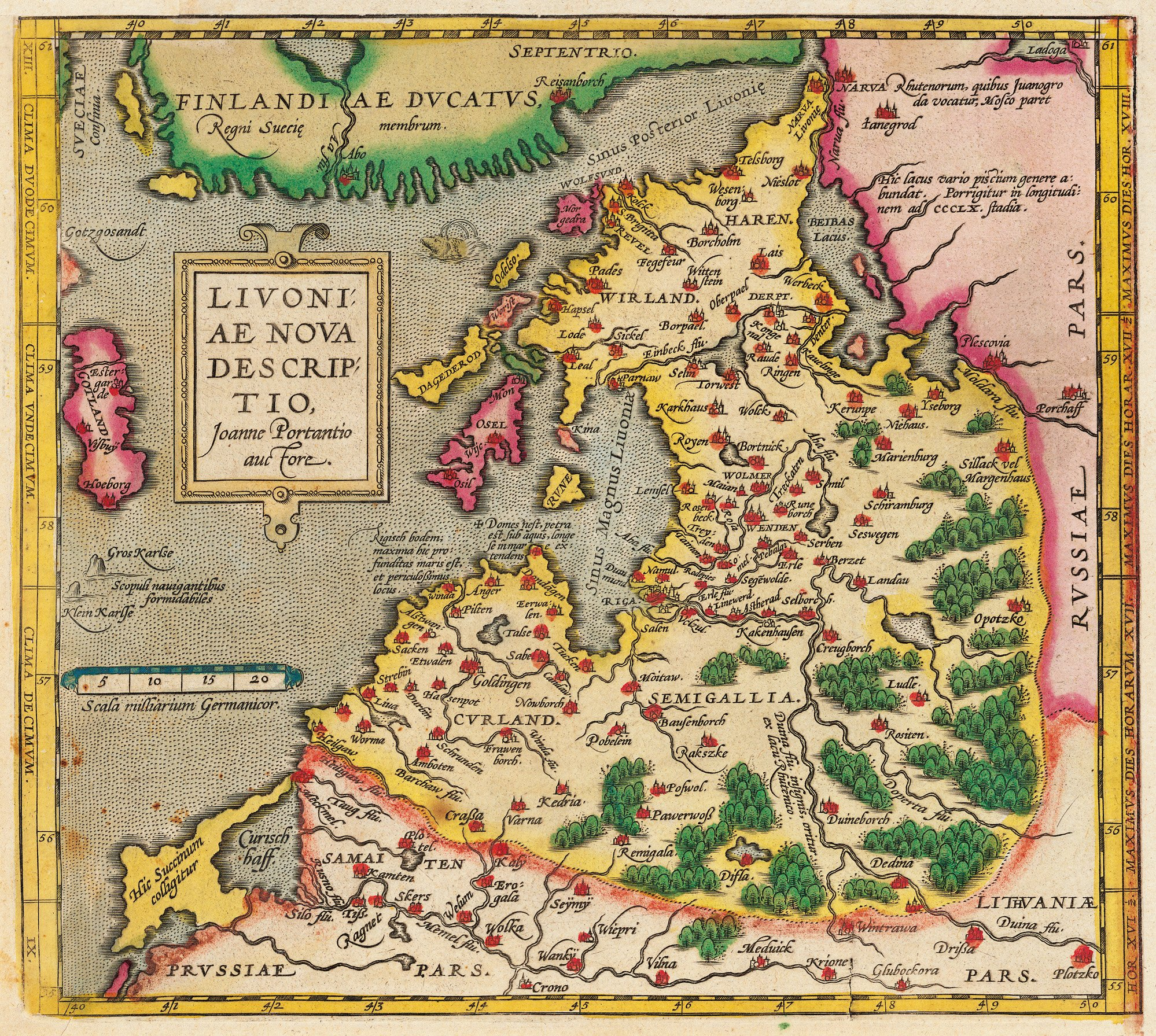
- Map of Old Livonia
Date	1577–1582
Location	Livonia; Poland–Lithuania; Russia
Result	Polish–Lithuanian victory

Belligerents
Poland–Lithuania; Principality of Transylvania	Russia

Commanders and leaders
Stephen Báthory; Jan Zamoyski	Ivan IV of Russia

The Livonian campaign of Stephen Báthory, also referred to as the Russo-Polish War of 1577–1582, took place in the final stage of the Livonian War, between 1577 and 1582. Polish–Lithuanian forces led by Stephen Báthory successfully fought against the army of Russian tsar Ivan IV ("the Terrible") over the Duchy of Livonia and Polotsk. Russian forces were expelled from Livonia before the campaign was concluded by the Truce of Jam Zapolski.

== Background ==
In the second half of the 16th century, several powers, including Poland, Lithuania, and Russia were engaged in the struggle over the control of the ports in the southern Baltic Sea (Dominium Maris Baltici). The Russo-Lithuanian War of 1558–1570, in which Poland aided Lithuania (and in 1569 united with it forming the Polish–Lithuanian Commonwealth), ended inconclusively with a three-year-long truce. The death of Polish king Sigismund II Augustus created a brief period in which Tsar Ivan IV of Russia contemplated taking part in the Polish royal election (see Polish–Lithuanian–Muscovite Commonwealth), but eventually the Commonwealth elected Stephen Báthory of Poland to its throne, and the hostilities between Russia and the Commonwealth resumed.

== 1575–1577 ==
In 1575 Ivan ordered another attack on Poland, and succeeded in taking parts of Livonia (notably, Salacgrīva and Pärnu). In 1577 Russian forces besieged Reval (Revel, Tallinn) and a strong army was concentrating near Pskov. At the same time Polish forces were tied down on the western side of the Baltic Sea, dealing with the Danzig rebellion. In July the main Muscovite army of about 30,000 advanced from Pskov, taking Viļaka, Rēzekne, Daugavpils, Koknese, Gulbene, and surrounding areas. A Polish counter-offensive—known as the First Campaign of Bathory—begun in the fall, and succeeded in taking back some of the territories.

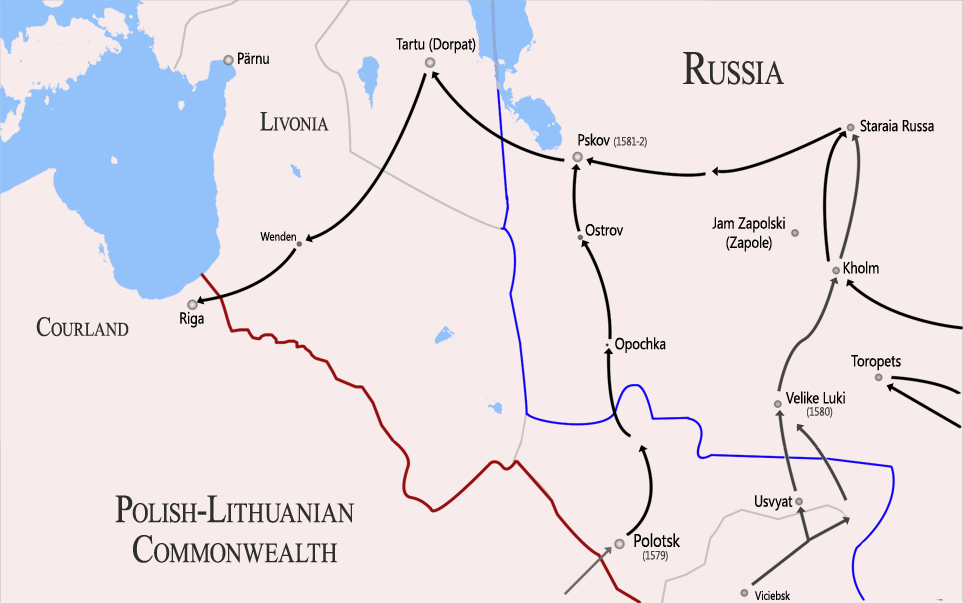
Campaigns of Stephen Báthory (1578-82)

== 1578 ==
Negotiations took part in that year, and a three-year truce was signed, although it was rejected by King Bathory who was preparing for a larger counteroffensive. At the same time, Polish and Swedish forces managed to stop further progress of the Muscovite forces in the Battles of Wenden (1577–1578).

== 1579–1580 ==
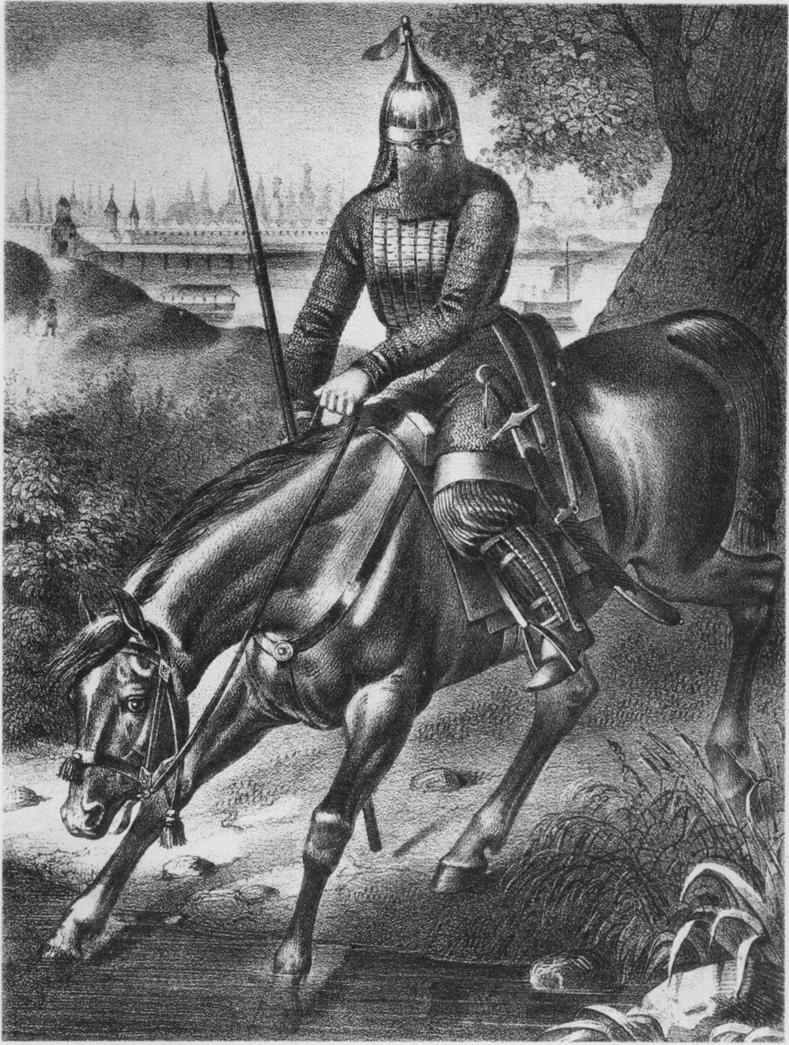
Russian cavalryman

=== Prelude ===
A large army was gathered prior to the campaign. In preparation to the campaign, some 7,311 cavalry and 6,519 infantry mercenaries were hired in the Kingdom of Poland, while the Grand Duchy of Lithuania hired 1,445 cavalry and 2,530 infantry mercenaries. The mercenaries were assembled into units according to their ethnicities (Hungarian, German, and Polish). The Hungarian mercenaries stayed on after the campaign, forming the Hajduk units. Combined with levies among the aristocrats, a force of 41,914 soldiers was assembled (22,975 from Lithuania and 18,739 from Poland). The majority of this force, 71%, were cavalry and mercenaries made up some 41% of the army. Peasant levy pioneer regiments, in addition to Russian streltsy and Ukrainian Cossack bands, were in the army. Bathory's army consisted of Polish, Lithuanian, Hungarian, Wallachian, Bohemian, and German soldiers, besides the Szekler brigade under Mózes Székely.

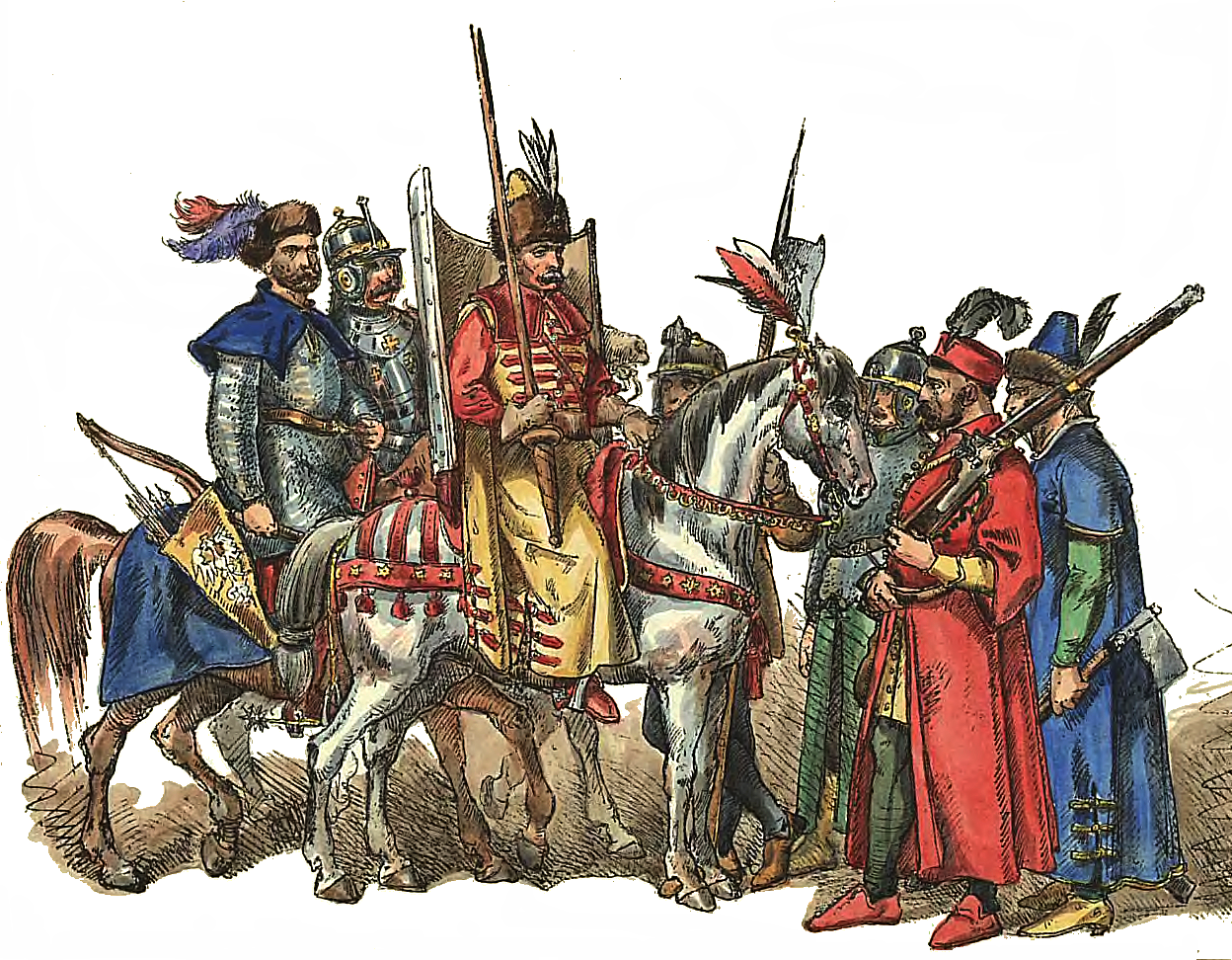
Polish-Lithuanian military men

=== Campaign ===
Bathory was the supreme commander of the main army (over 40,000 strong), however, he appointed commanders to lead different parts of it:

- Lithuanian nobility was led by Mikołaj "the Red" Radziwiłł,
- Lithuanian-hired mercenaries were commanded by Krzysztof Mikołaj "Perkūnas" Radziwiłł,
- German mercenaries were under the command of Krzysztof Rozdrażewski,
- Hungarian mercenaries were led by Gáspár Bekes,
- The Royal Household Guard was led by Janusz Zbaraski,
- The rest were placed under command of Mikolaj Mielecki.

The Lithuanian soldiers were reluctant to follow any orders given by Polish commanders and set up their own military camps apart from the Poles, took military decisions autonomously, in addition to many other actions, sometimes to the detriment of the war effort. In other words, the army did not have a centralised command system.

During the fighting known as the Second Campaign of Bathory, the army advanced on Polotsk. The siege began on 11 August, and the city surrendered on the 29th of that month. The Polish-Lithuanian army also captured all 8 Russian-occupied castles in Polotsk - Rasony region (Sokol, Nescherda, Susha, Krasnae, Turovlia, Sitna, Kaz'jany, Usviaty) . Lithuanian-Polish forces resumed their offensive the following year with the Third Campaign of Bathory, besieging Velikiye Luki on 29 August and taking it on 5 September. A cavalry battle took place on 20 September near Toropets and ended in another victory for the Commonwealth. The joint forces also captured Velizh and Nevel.

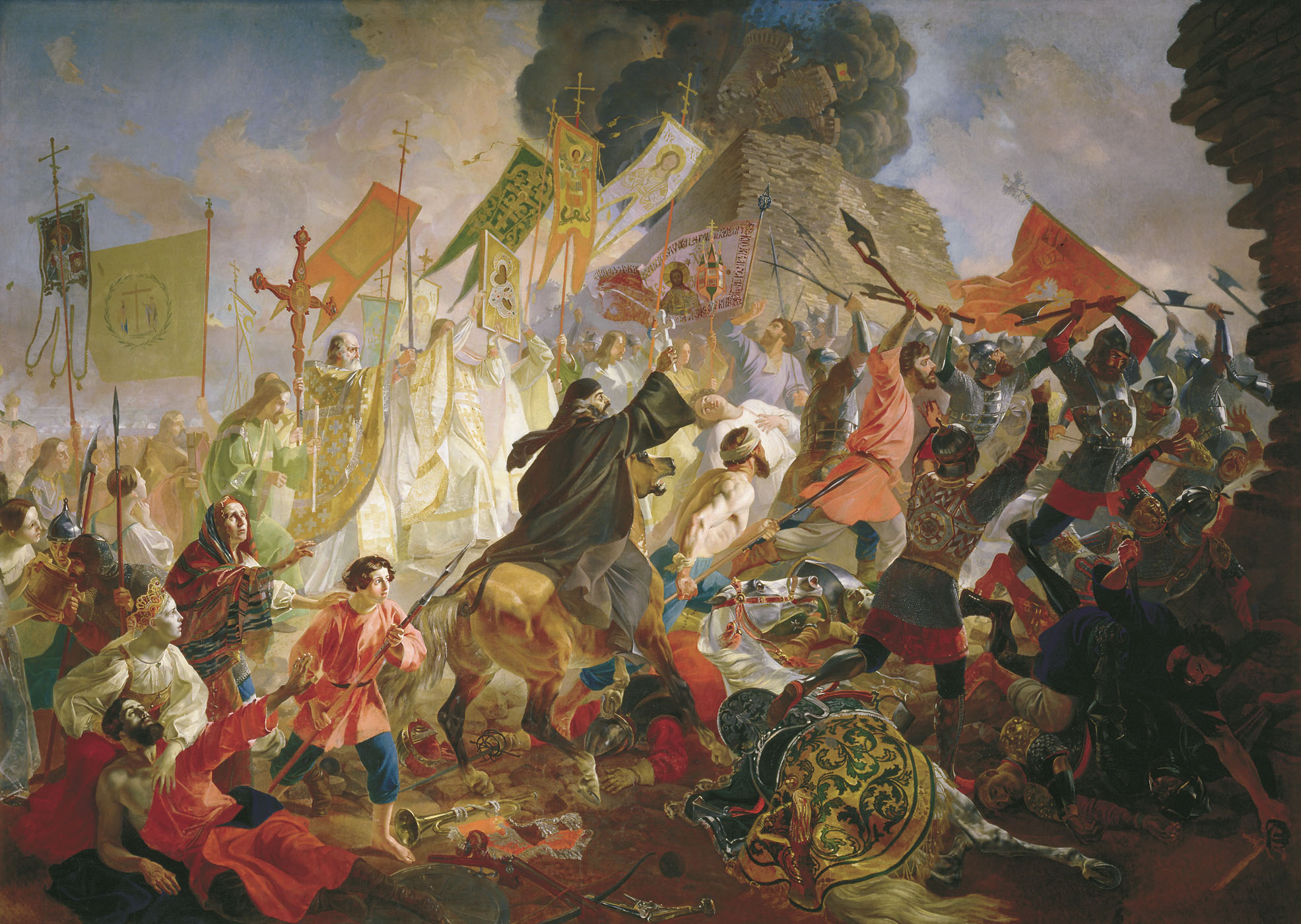
Siege of Pskov, the last (and unfinished) painting of Karl Briullov; the siege from Russian perspective...

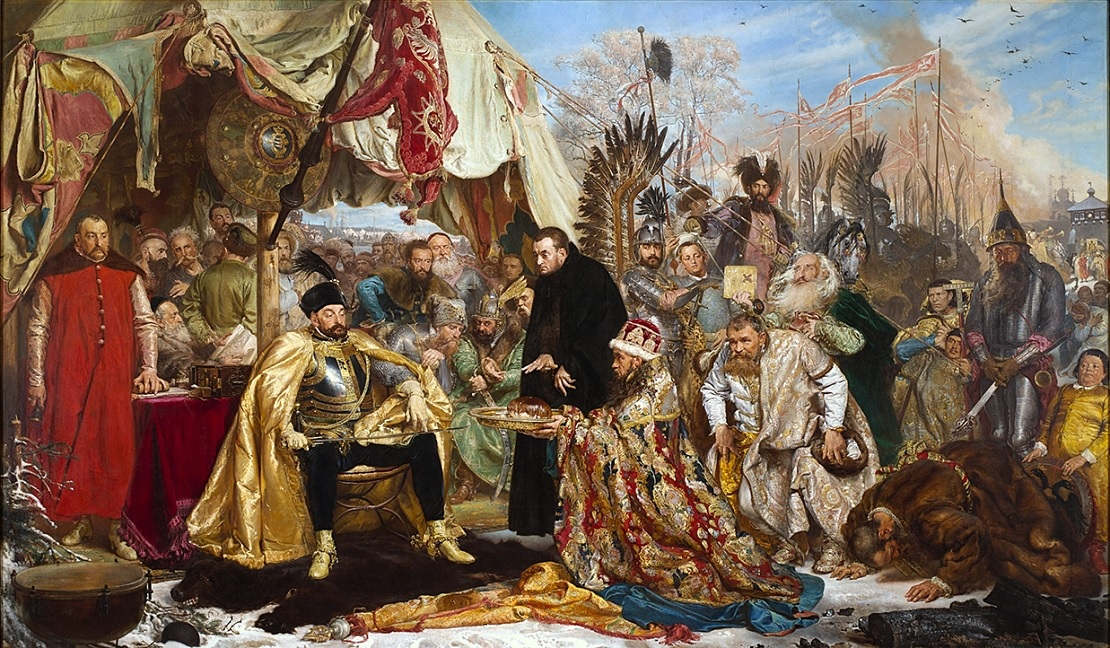
...and the siege from Polish perspective, "Bathory at Pskov" by Jan Matejko.

== 1581–1582 ==
The last phase of the war centered around the siege of Pskov by the Polish forces. Báthory did not succeed in taking the town, but the Russians, facing growing threat from Sweden (who took Narva in the battle of Narva (1581)), decided to sign a truce treaty favorable to Poland.

== Truce of Jam Zapolski ==
The truce, signed in 1582 for 10 years, was favorable to Poland, which regained Duchy of Livonia, kept Velizh and Polotsk. Russia regained Velikiye Luki. Notably, Russia failed in her bid to regain access to the Baltic Sea.

The next stage of the Polish-Russian wars begun in the early 1600s, when the Poles invaded Russia in 1605.

== Sources ==
- Penskoi, Vitaly (2021). "Центурионы" Ивана Грозного: Воеводы и головы Московского войска второй половины XVI века ["Centurions" of Ivan the Terrible: Voivodes and Heads of the Moscow army of the second half of the XVI century] (in Russian). Series: Новейшие исследования по истории России [The latest research on the history of Russia]. Moscow: Центрополиграф. ISBN 978-5-227-09581-7.
