= Moses Székely =

Prince of Transylvania

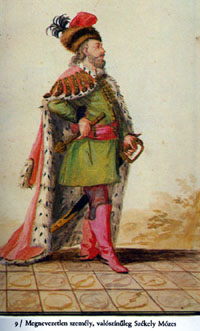
Mózes Székely

Moses Székely (Hungarian: Székely Mózes; c. 1553 – 17 July 1603) was Prince of Transylvania in 1603.

He was a military leader under Prince Sigismund Báthory. After the latter's third and final abdication in 1601, Transylvania was controlled by the mercenaries of Habsburg general Giorgio Basta. In April 1603, Székely instigated the native Transylvanian forces to rebel and, with the support of Turkish-Tartarian auxiliary forces, routed Basta's troops. On 8 May 1603, Székely claimed the title of a Prince of Transylvania, but his rule proved unstable, as his Tartarian mercenaries outdid Basta's troops in cruelty and Radu Șerban, the new Voivode of Wallachia attacked as an ally of the Habsburgs.

Mózes' own kinsmen, the Székely, joined forces with the invaders, who defeated and killed Mózes in the Battle of Brașov on 17 July 1603. Radu withdrew to Wallachia, making way for a return of Basta's mercenaries. Székely was the only Székely monarch of the Transylvanian Principality.

== Early life ==
Moses Székely was born in Székelyudvarhely (now Odorheiu Secuiesc in Romania) around 1553. His father, János Literáti Székely, was a Székely nobleman (or primipilus). His mother is unknown. Moses had three brothers, István, János and Péter.

John Sigismund Zápolya, who ruled the eastern territories of the medieval Kingdom of Hungary as vassal of the Ottoman Empire, made János Literáti the ispán (or head) of the chamber of salt in 1568. According to the Transylvanian historian, István Szamosközy, Moses traded in salt in his youth. After John Sigismund converted to Unitarianism in the late 1560s, Moses was one of the many Székely noblemen who also adopted the Anti-Trinitarian doctrine.

== Career ==
After the death of John Sigismund, the Diet of Transylvania elected Stephen Báthory voivode (or ruler) on 25 May 1571. Báthory's opponent, Gáspár Bekes, invaded Transylvania from Royal Hungary in summer 1575. Bekes was Unitarian, but Moses Székely supported the Catholic Báthory, along with other prominent Unitarian noblemen. He swam over the Maros River at Radnót (now Iernut in Romania) with a sword in his mouth and killed one of Bekes's warriors in a duel. His bravery was noticed by Báthory who made him the commander of his Székely guards. Moses Székely was the first to lead an attack against Bekes's army in the decisive Battle of Kerelőszentpál, which ended with Báthory's triumph on 8 July.

Stephen Báthory was elected ruler of the Polish–Lithuanian Commonwealth on 15 December 1575. Moses accompanied Báthory to Poland. He was one of the commanders of the infantry during the siege of Danzig in 1577. He was injured on his knee during the siege of Polotsk in August 1579. He also participated in the siege of Pskov in 1581. However, he had to leave the army after he cut the ear of a Hungarian nobleman in a duel.

Moses was made the ispán of the salt mine at Felsősófalva (now Ocna de Sus in Romania) in 1582 or 1583. Before long, the royal estates at Siménfalva and Lövéte in the Principality of Transylvania (now Șimonești and Lueta in Romania) were granted to him. His manor house was built in Siménfalva. Moses married in late December 1584, but his wife died in the following year. Historian Lukács Sándor Szekeres says that his wife is unknown, but Judit Balogh associates her with Elisabeth Bodoni, a daughter of the captain of Udvarhelyszék. Moses was mentioned as ispán for the last time on 5 February 1591, but he may have retained this office until 1594 or 1595, according to Szekeres.

The Serbs who lived in the Temeşvar Eyalet rose up against the Ottomans and sought assistance from Sigismund Báthory, Prince of Transylvania. Báthory dispatched Moses at the head of a small army to assist them. By the time the Transylvanian troops crossed the border in June 1594, the Ottomans defeated the Serbs. According to historian Judit Balogh, the Serbs' revolt fell because of the delay of the Transylvanian army. Moses laid siege to the fortress of Facsád (now Făget in Romania) without awaiting the arrival of the infantry. The Transylvanian cavalry could not break into the fortress and Moses was injured which forced him to lift the siege on 30 November. Moses never made a full recovery from the injury and he remained lame for the rest of his life.

Moses participated in the war against the Ottomans in Wallachia in June 1595. Before long, he joined György Borbély, Ban of Karánsebes, who launched an invasion against the Ottoman Empire in late summer. The Transylvanian army captured at least six fortresses along the Maros River before the end of the year. There is no record of his activities during the following years, showing that he gave up his public career for a while. He wanted to prevent the commoners of Bikafalva (now Tăureni in Romania) from turning their pigs loose in his forests to fill and fatten themselves on acorn, but the Court of Udvarhelyszék made a judgement against him in October 1569. At the request of Sigismund Báthory, Moses exchanged his estates in Vágás (now Tăietura in Romania) for the prince's estate at Libaton in March 1598.

== Anarchy ==
Sigismund Báthory abdicated and transferred Transylvania to the Holy Roman Emperor, Rudolph II, on 23 March 1598. Rudolph nominated three imperial commissioners to take charge of the government of Transylvania. Moses Székely started negotiations with one of the commissioners, Bartholomeus Pezzen, in Brassó (now Brașov in Romania) in June, urging the emperor to send an army to Transylvania before the Ottomans invade the principality. After accepting the suzerainty of Rudolph II, Michael the Brave, Voivode of Wallachia, asked the emperor to send Moses Székely to him to take charge of the command of the Wallachian army.in Szászsebes (now Sebeș in Romania). Báthory sent Moses Székely and István Csáky at the head of an army against Várad (now Oradea in Romania), because its captain refused to do homage to him. Before their arrival, an Ottoman army laid siege to Várad. Moses and his Székely warriors routed a band of Ottoman and Tatar marauders near the town, and the Ottoman army withdrew from the principality.

Rudolph II made Michael the Brave his governor in Transylvania. After Michael appointed him the supreme commander of the Transylvanian army, Moses Székely joined him in Gyulafehérvár, but he had left his wife in Marosvásárhely (now Târgu Mureș in Romania) in the custody of her father. Before long, Michael the Brave granted Teke and Mezőszilvás (now Teaca and Silivașu de Câmpie in Romania), and other estates in Kolozs County to Moses and his son. On 24 January 1600, Michael the Brave issued a new charter, confirming the possessions that Moses had seized in Transylvania during the rule of the Báthorys. On the other hand, the voivode who did not trust Moses always asked Rudolph's envoys not to talk about confidential issues if Moses was also attained their meeting.

Michael the Brave invaded Moldavia in May 1600. Moses, who had been made captain of Udvarhelyszék, was one of the commanders of Michael's troops. After Michael returned to Transylvania, Moses stayed behind in Moldavia to command the voivode's army along with a Wallachian boyar, Mirza. Michael could not stabilize his rule in Transylvania, although he forced more than a dozen Transylvanian noblemen to move to Wallachia. Moses Székely returned to Transylvania in late summer 1600 to meet Gáspár Sibrik, György Makó and other Transylvanian noblemen in Burzenland. Michael the Brave summoned them to the Diet to Gyulafehérvár in late August, but Moses and his allies fled to Poland to convince Sigismund Báthory to again lay claim to Transylvania.

After brief spells during which Transylvania was controlled by Wallachian prince Michael the Brave and subsequently by mercenaries of Habsburg general Giorgio Basta, Moses Székely instigated the native Transylvanian forces to rebel and, with the support of Turkish-Tartarian auxiliary forces, proclaimed himself Prince of Transylvania on 8 May 1603.

Székely's attempt to replace the Habsburg presence in Transylvania with a government that was friendly to the Ottoman Empire was unacceptable to Radu Șerban, who ”could not allow Wallachia to be caught in a vice between the Ottoman Empire south of the Danube and a Transylvania that swore fealty to it." Much of the Transylvanian nobility sided with Șerban, against the excesses of the Ottoman-backed usurper, with Brașov itself remaining loyal to the Habsburg. The also pro-monarchy Székelys (Szeklers) of Háromszék and Csíkszék June 8, joined Radu Șerban's forces under captains Bedő and Máttyus (3,000 cavalry and infantry).

In July 1603 several smaller Wallachian-Habsburg forces crossed the Carpathians and engaged in skirmishes with Mózes Székely's forces near Feldioara, resulting in an early strategic victory. Unsure of his chances in open battle against the bulk of the Wallachian army, Székely adopted a defensive posture, entrenching his army (consisting of 4000 Hungarians, 2000 Tatars, and 25 light cannons) near Râșnov in an improvised camp surrounded by linked carts. On the 15th of July Radu Șerban crossed the mountains and joined the rest of the forces. In total, the Wallachian-Habsburg army consisted of 10,000 men: two flanks of 2000 soldiers each and a main army of 6000 men led by Șerban himself.The left wing was led by the Hungarian György Rácz, while the right wing was led by the Serbian mercenary Deli Marko.

The main battle took place on 17 July, when the Wallachian troops attacked the defending camp. Following prolonged close combat, the defenders started suffering heavy losses and broke ranks, attempting to flee. Șerban gave the order to follow and cut down those who were trying to escape This included Mózes Székely who, refusing to surrender, attempted to flee to Brașov to save his life, but Rácz's cavalry overtook him. The prince defended himself bravely, until finally a Székely cavalier named Katona Mihály seriously wounded him and Rácz beheaded him.

== Family ==
Moses's elder son, Stephen, was only mentioned in Michael the Brave's charter on 1 December 1599, which shows that he died in infancy. His younger son, Moses the Younger was born after his death.

== Sources ==
- Balogh, Judit (2012). "Székely Mózes". In Gujdár, Noémi; Szatmáry, Nóra (eds.). Magyar királyok nagykönyve: Uralkodóink, kormányzóink és az erdélyi fejedelmek életének és tetteinek képes története [Encyclopedia of the Kings of Hungary: An Illustrated History of the Life and Deeds of Our Monarchs, Regents and the Princes of Transylvania] (in Hungarian). Reader's Digest. pp. 190–193. ISBN 978-963-289-214-6.
- Barta, Gábor (1994). "The Emergence of the Principality and its First Crises (1526–1606)". In Köpeczi, Béla; Barta, Gábor; Bóna, István; Makkai, László; Szász, Zoltán; Borus, Judit (eds.). History of Transylvania. Akadémiai Kiadó. pp. 247–300. ISBN 963-05-6703-2.
- Granasztói, György (1981). "A három részre szakadt ország és a török kiűzése (1557–1605)". In Benda, Kálmán; Péter, Katalin (eds.). Magyarország történeti kronológiája, II: 1526–1848 [Historical Chronology of Hungary, Volume I: 1526–1848] (in Hungarian). Akadémiai Kiadó. pp. 390–430. ISBN 963-05-2662-X.
- Keul, István (2009). Early Modern Religious Communities in East-Central Europe: Ethnic Diversity, Denominational Plurality, and Corporative Politics in the Principality of Transylvania (1526–1691). Brill. ISBN 978-90-04-17652-2.
- Pop, Ioan-Aurel (2009). "Michael the Brave and Transylvania". In Pop, Ioan-Aurel; Nägler, Thomas; Magyari, András (eds.). The History of Transylvania, Vo. II (From 1541 to 1711). Romanian Academy, Center for Transylvanian Studies. pp. 75–96. ISBN 978-973-7784-04-9.
- Szekeres, Lukács Sándor (2007). Székely Mózes: Erdély székely fejedelme [Moses Székely: The Székely Prince of Transylvania] (in Hungarian).

Moses Székely Székely de Siménfalva Born: 1553
Vacant Land of the Hungarian Crown Title last held by Sigismund Báthory	Prince of Transylvania; 1603–1603	Vacant Land of the Hungarian Crown Title next held by Stephen Bocskai
