= Krzysztof Warszewicki =

Polish noble, diplomat and writer (1543–1603)

Krzysztof Warszewicki (1543–1603), also known as Christopher or Christophorus Varsevicius, was a Polish noble, courtier, diplomat, politician, orator and writer. He was described in a 1960 article in journal The Polish Review as a "very prominent politician and prolific political-juridical writer", a "typical Renaissance statesman" and a "zealous Catholic".

== Biography ==
Warszewicki was born in a Polish noble (szlachta) family whose name originated from their estate of Warszewice. His father, Jan, was a castellan of Warsaw. He was the younger brother of Jesuit and writer Stanisław Warszewicki.

He studied at University of Wittenberg. While abroad, he joined the royal court at the Vienna as a page, and became a royal secretary of Ferdinand I, Holy Roman Emperor. During that time he visited a number of countries, including the United Kingdom, and learned languages including French, Spanish, German, and Italian. By the 1560s he returned to Poland, where he served as a secretary to the bishop of Poznań, Adam Konarski. Later he became the canon of Kraków. He served as a Polish diplomat in several diplomatic mission (to Muscovy and Scandinavia during the reign of Stefan Batory), accompanying Batory during the Siege of Pskov and acting as one of the principal Polish negotiators for the subsequent Truce of Yam-Zapolsky of 1582.

In his political activities during the period of royal elections, Warszewicki supported the monarchs, in particular, Henry of Valoise, and later, House of Hapsburg candidates for the Polish throne. That last decision ended up badly for him; when the Hapsburgs lost the elections, he suffered from royal disfavor and exile which may or may not have been voluntary (sources vary).

== Works, views and assessment ==
Warszewicki was a vocal critic of the system of royal free elections and Golden Freedoms in the Polish Kingdom. He supported strengthening the royal power of that of the nobility. He has been described as one of the most famous writers of the Polish counter-reformation camp. He also supported the idea of a Crusade against the Ottoman Empire.

Warszewicki published a number of works, including a work of poetry, and his only work in Polish, Wenecya (1572), a guidebook to Venice; his other works were in Latin. He published his thoughts on diplomacy in De Legatoet Lagatione (1595). His later major work, De optimo statu libertatis (1598), focused on political issues; one of its main themes was the concept of liberty. Those two works have been described as "his two major contributions to Renaissance political literature". Other works of his include Turcicae Quatuordecim (1598) and De Cognitione (1600). Warszewicki also authored five works focused on theological issues: Dialogus de morte (1581), Clypeus spiritualis (1582), De factis et dictis Jesu Christi (1583), Pro Christi fide et Petri sede (1583), and De morte et immortalitate animae (1599). While most of his works were printed and reprinted in Poland and the Holy Roman Empire, some of his works saw reprints as far as Venice, Spain, France, Sweden, and Rome.

Both in Poland and abroad, Warszewicki was a respected orator. He spoke at the coronation ceremony of Henry of Valoise in 1574, and, in 1576, gave a funerary oration at the funeral of the Emperor Maximilian II. His funerary oration for the king Stefan Batory (d.1586), Vita, Res Gestae et Obitus Stephani Regis Poloniae, has been described as "very popular". Another royal funeral at which he spoke was that of Catherine of Austria, Queen of Poland (d. 1572). His speech from the Yam-Zapolsky negotiations, Christophori Warszewicii ad Stephanum re gem Poloniae oratio, qua cum Joanne Magno Moscorum duce XV Januarii ad Zapolskiam confectam pacem gratulatur, was quickly reprinted in Poland and Germany.

Polish historian Eugeniusz Jarra described Warszewicki as a controversial figure among modern historians, some of whom consider him an influential writer, while others see him as more derivative.
