= Moses Székely the Younger =

Moses Székely
- Born: July 1603; Temeşvar, Temeşvar Eyalet, Ottoman Empire (today Timișoara, Romania)
- Died: c. 1658; Rhodes (?), Ottoman Empire (today Greece)
- Noble family: Székely de Siménfalva
- Spouse: Judit Lónyay
- Issue: Sigismund
- Father: Moses, Sr.
- Mother: Anna Kornis

Moses Székely (the Younger) de Siménfalva (Hungarian: siménfalvi ifjabb Székely Mózes; July 1603 – c. 1658) was a Székely nobleman, the posthumous son of Moses Székely, Sr. who briefly served as Prince of Transylvania in 1603.

== Early life ==
Days after her husband was killed in the Battle of Kronstadt on 17 July 1603, Anna Kornis gave birth to a son in Temesvár, which then belonged to the Ottoman Empire and was capital of the Temeşvar Eyalet (today Timișoara, Romania). Historian István Szamosközy preserved the details of his early life in his work Rerum Transylvanarum Pentades és Hebdomades. Later that year Anna Kornis died of plague in Temesvár, orphaning Moses at a few months of age. His maternal grandmother Krisztina Bethlen, the widow of diplomat Farkas Kornis took care the infant. Her son-in-law János Petki, who had earlier opposed Prince Moses' political orientation, arbitrarily seized Moses the Younger's inherited estates and possessions. Krisztina Bethlen turned for protection to Prince Stephen Bocskai. Moses was ten years old when his grandmother died. Following that he came under the patronage of Prince Gabriel Bethlen, his distant relative. Moses Székely attended the newly established Academicum Collgeium seu Gymnasium Illustre in Gyulafehérvár (today Alba Iulia, Romania). After years he became a familial at the princely court and after years of service, he functioned as master of the stewards there.

Gabriel Bethlen appointed Székely as judge of Udvarhelyszék and donated Marosújvár Castle (today Ocna Mureș, Romania) and the surrounding villages to him in 1620. At the age of 25 Székely married Judit Lónyay, on 13 February 1629. His wife was the widow of András Geréb, the last member of the once-powerful noble house. Through the marriage Székely received Fiátfalva (today part of Cristuru Secuiesc), Szederjes and four other villages (today part of Vânători) and several other domains in Udvarhelyszék, Aranyosszék and Torda County.

== Exile ==
His career and fate took a sharp downturn after the death of Gabriel Bethlen and George I Rákóczi's accession to the Transylvanian throne. The new prince immediately confiscated the Geréb heirdom, overriding his predecessor's provision, and also accused Székely of being part of a conspiracy led by Dávid Zólyomi against him. As a result, Székely moved to Temesvár in early December 1632, leaving behind his pregnant wife. As the son of the late Moses Sr. he became a political trump in the hands of Nikolaus, Count Esterházy, the Palatine of Hungary and the Sublime Porte against George Rákóczi. Meanwhile, Székely also "laid claim to his father's realm". According to contemporaries, including Szamosközy, John Kemény and Georg Krauss, an ahidnâme which had been drafted during Prince Moses' rule and contained his still unborn namesake son's appointment as Prince of Transylvania, was in the possession of Székely.

George Rákóczi unsuccessfully asked the Porte to extradite Székely. In August 1633 the Transylvanian Diet sentenced to death Dávid Zólyomi and Moses Székely and confiscated their properties. The prince promised a full amnesty to Székely when returning home, but he refused the offer. Although Székely was formally imprisoned at the Yedikule Fortress, he enjoyed a relatively high degree of freedom and was authorized to correspond with domestic supporters, which meant a constant threat to Rákóczi. This manifested in the summer of 1635, when a certain Yusef Agha came with a letter to Transylvania which reflected a possible appointment of Székely as Prince. Albeit the letter later proved to be a private action by Székely, this further increased the tension in the domestic politics of Transylvania. With the help of his partisans, Székely tried to gain support in Moldavia. In response, Rákóczi asked Grand Vizier Tabanıyassı Mehmed Pasha to extradite or assassinate Székely during a secret correspondence. The Grand Vizier refused his request.

By the 1640s, Székely lost all political influence in Transylvania. His uncle and last domestic supporter Simon Péchi died in December 1643. In addition, the late Gabriel Bethlen's brother, Stephen became a more significant potential pretender to the Transylvanian throne in the eyes of the Sublime Porte. Székely was taken away from Stamboul and lived in Rhodes since 1646. When George II Rákóczi delayed the payment of regular tax in 1650, the Ottomans threatened to replace him with Székely. According to historian John Kemény, Moses Székely died in exile around 1658. As his name as potential pretender did not arise following Rákóczi's disastrous campaign against Poland, it is possible he was already dead by 1657. His only son, Sigismund (Zsigmond) was born in 1633, after his emigration to the Ottoman Empire thus they never met each other.

== Sources ==
- Horn, Ildikó (2009). "Ifjabb Székely Mózes (1603–1658?) [Moses Székely the Younger (1603–1658?)]". In Körmendi, Tamás; Thoroczkay, Gábor (eds.). Auxilium Historiae. Tanulmányok a hetvenesztendős Bertényi Iván tiszteletére (in Hungarian). Faculty of Arts, Eötvös Loránd University. pp. 143–148. ISBN 978-963-284-105-2.
