= Griselda Báthory =

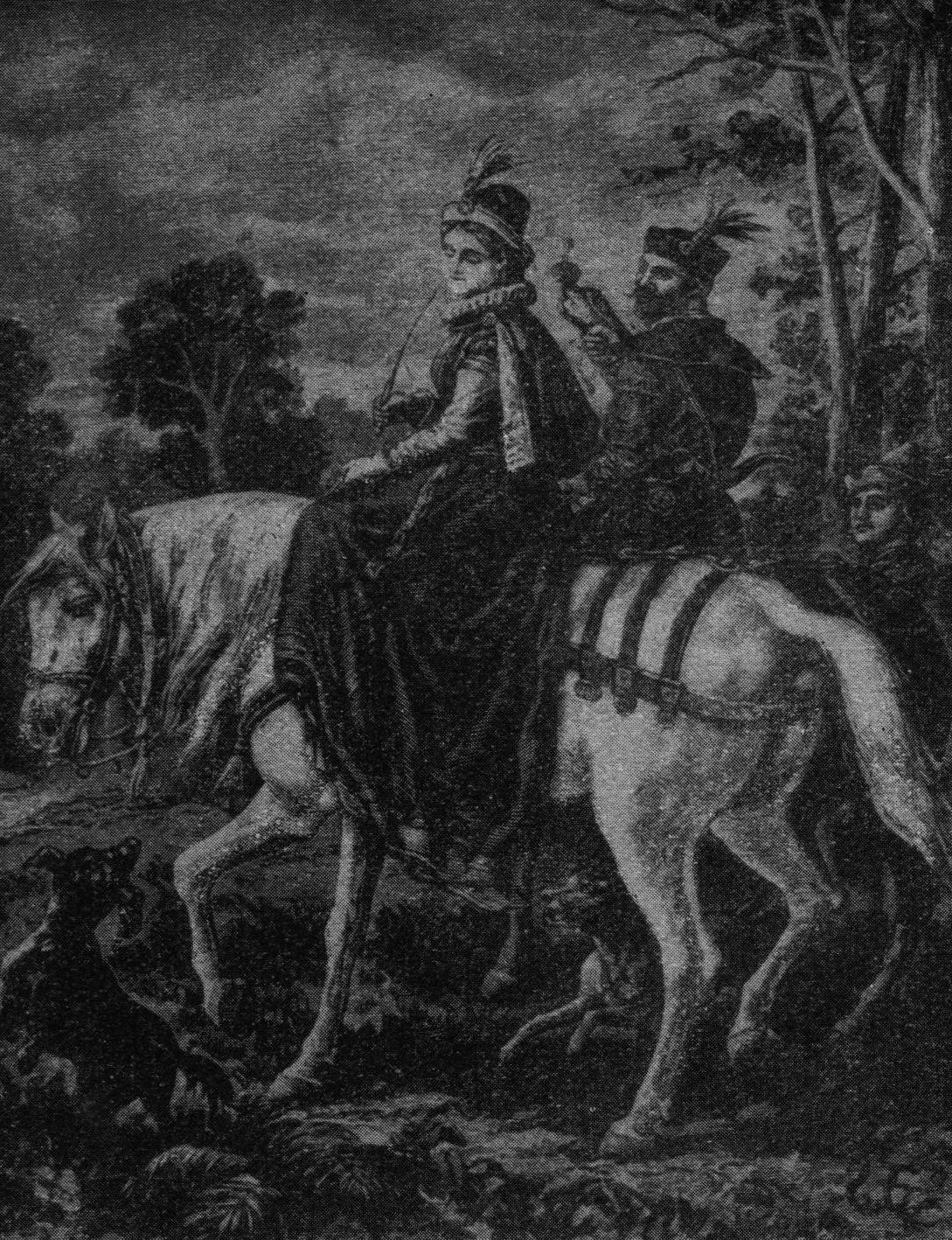
Griselda Báthory

Griselda (née Christine) Báthory (1569-1590) was a Hungarian and Polish noble, the daughter of Christopher Báthory, and third wife of Jan Zamoyski.

At the time of her wedding with Zamoyski, her relative, Stephen Báthory, was king of Poland. Zamoyski, in turn, was one of Poland's chief political and military leaders, and their marriage tied him even more closely to his king's side.
