= Siege of Polotsk (1579) =

Polish–Lithuanian victory of the Livonian War

- Part of the Livonian campaign of Stephen Báthory in the Livonian War
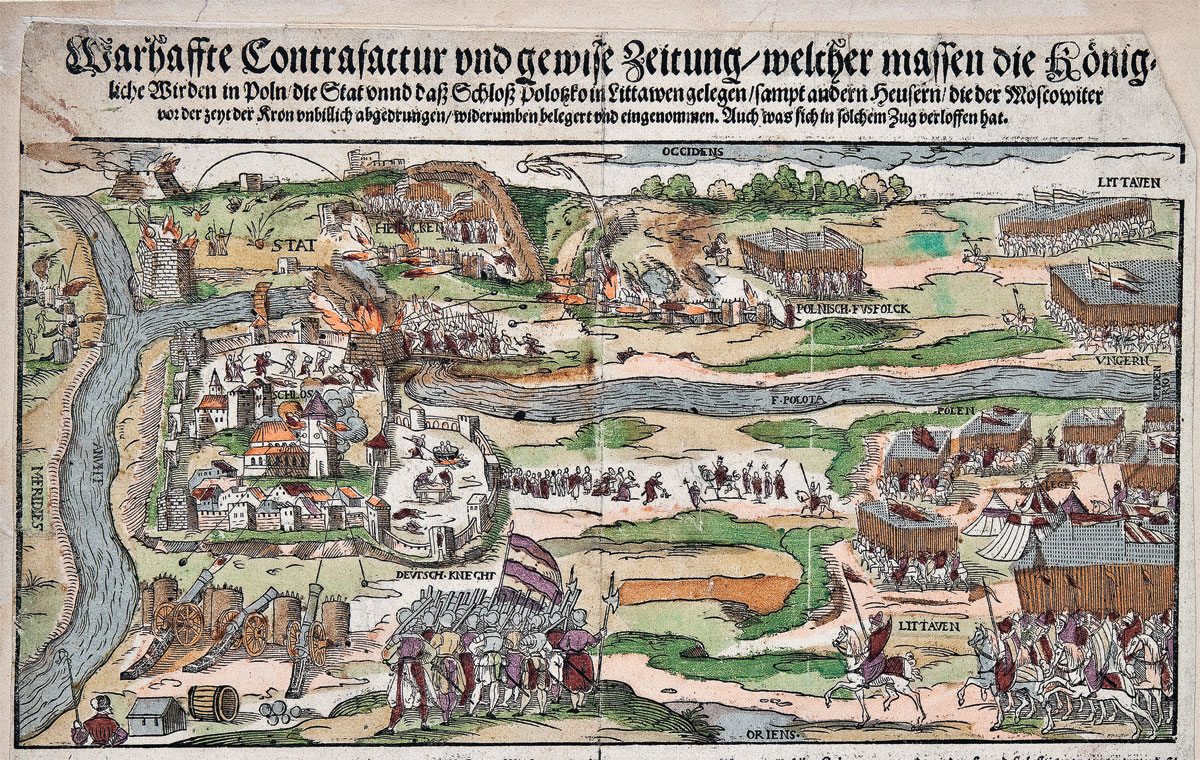
- The Siege of Polotsk, 1579, in a contemporary illustration.
Date	August 11–30, 1579
Location	Polotsk 55°29′13″N 28°45′39″E
Result	Polish–Lithuanian victory
Territorial changes	Polish–Lithuanian Commonwealth captures Polotsk

Belligerents
Polish–Lithuanian Commonwealth	Tsardom of Russia

Commanders and leaders
Stefan Bathory; Mikołaj Mielecki; Jan Zborowski; Gáspár Bekes; Krzysztof Rozdrażewski; Mikołaj "the Red" Radziwiłł; Krzysztof "Piorun" Radziwiłł	Ivan IV of Russia residing in Pskov; Knyaz Wasyl Iwanowicz Tielatiewski garrison commander

Strength
41,714: 18,000 German mercenaries; 67 cannons	~6,000 garrison; 38 cannons

Casualties and losses
At least 1,462 including dead, injured, deserted: 602 Polish; 860 Germans; unknown number of Hungarians(probably similar to Polish losses); unknown small number of Lithuanians	Up to 2,000 dead All others captured and then released except commander and a few city elders.

The siege of Polotsk (Russian: Осада Полоцка, Polish: Oblężenie Połocka,Lithuanian: Polocko apgultis, Belarusian: Аблога Полацка) was a siege by forces of the Polish–Lithuanian Commonwealth under Stephen Báthory on the Russian-held city of Polotsk. Polotsk had been captured and heavily fortified by the Russians under Ivan the Terrible in 1563 because the river Daugava, which led to the key city of Riga, flowed through it. Hungarian soldiers, led by Caspar Bekes, Polish soldiers, led by Mikolaj Mielecki, and Lithuanian soldiers, led by Mikolaj Radziwill, converged at the Dzisna fortress, joined Bathory's men, and moved on to Polotsk, with a total force of about 42,000. Polotsk had three fortresses: the central one, nearby Strelec fortress, and the walled town of Zapolochie. The primary focus was on the central fortress: first with artillery, which failed because it only punctured the wooden walls, then with cannons, and eventually with fire. The Russians defended Polotsk with trenches and artillery, but after the Hungarian contingent captured Zapolochie, the Russians surrendered. After taking the city, Bathory's forces then moved to besiege Velikiye Luki.
