= Truce of Yam-Zapolsky =

1582 peace treaty between the Poland–Lithuania and Russia

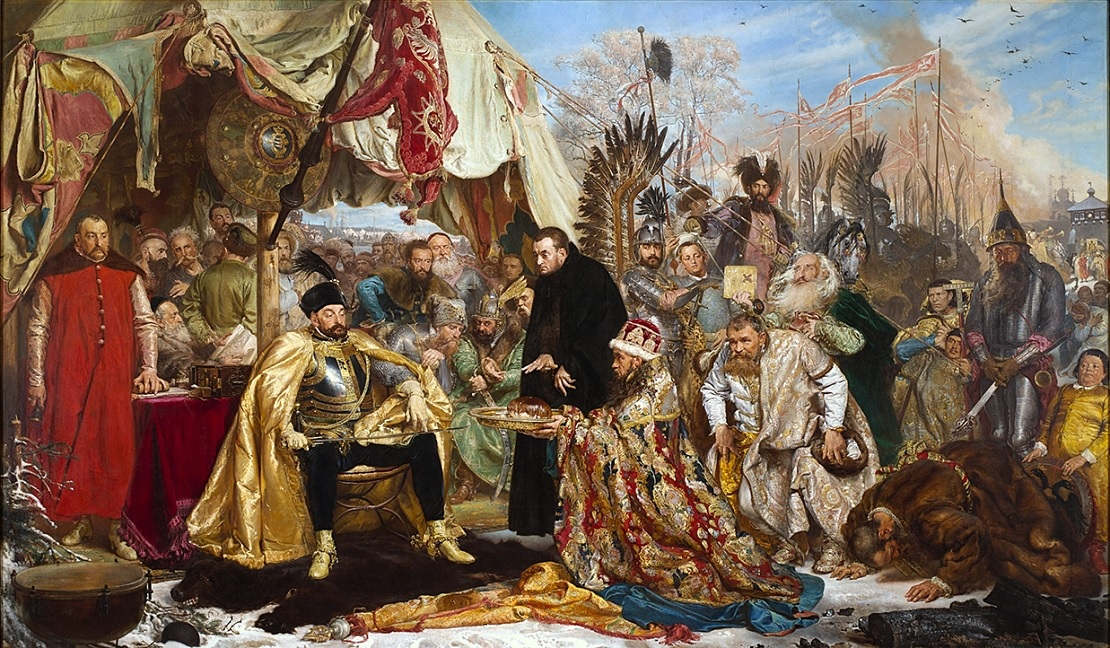
Stephen Báthory near Pskov. Painting by Jan Matejko, 1872.

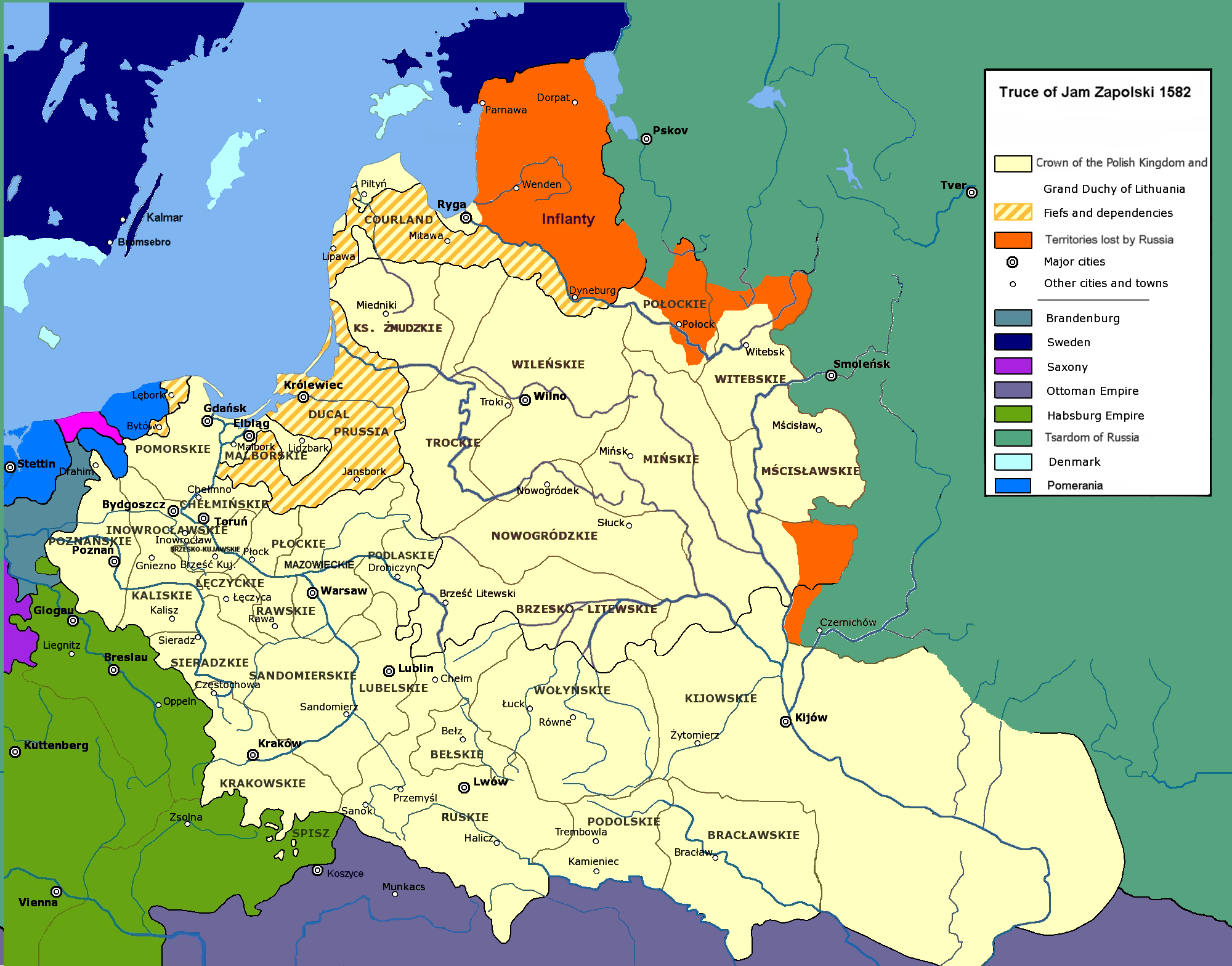
Truce of Yam-Zapolsky, orange indicates territories recovered by Polish–Lithuanian Commonwealth

The Truce or Treaty of Yam-Zapolsky (Ям-Запольский) or Jam Zapolski, signed on 15 January 1582 between the Polish–Lithuanian Commonwealth and the Tsardom of Russia, was one of the treaties that ended the Livonian War. It followed the successful Livonian campaign of Stephen Báthory, culminating in the siege of Pskov.

The truce was concluded with help of papal legate Antonio Possevino and was signed for the Polish–Lithuanian Commonwealth by King of Poland and Grand Duke of Lithuania Stefan Batory and for Russia by Tsar Ivan the Terrible, and established a ten-year truce.

In the terms of the treaty, Russia renounced its claims to Livonia and Polotsk but conceded no core Russian territories as Batory returned the territories his armies had been occupying (particularly, he gave up on the siege of Pskov and left the town of Velikiye Luki. The truce was extended for twenty years in 1600, when a diplomatic mission to Moscow led by Lew Sapieha concluded negotiations with Tsar Boris Godunov. The truce was broken when the Poles invaded Russia in 1605.

One of the principal negotiators on the Polish side was Krzysztof Warszewicki.

== See also ==
- Treaty of Plussa – Russo-Swedish truce
- Treaty of Drohiczyn – concerning Riga
- List of treaties
- Timeline of Polish diplomacy
- Timeline of Russian history
