= Catherine Telegdi =

16th-century Hungarian noblewoman

- Born: 1492
- Died: 1547 (aged 54–55)
- Noble family: Telegdi of Kincstartó
- Spouse: Stephen VIII Báthory
- Father: Stephen Teledgi of Kincstartó
- Mother: Margaret Bebek of Pelsőcz

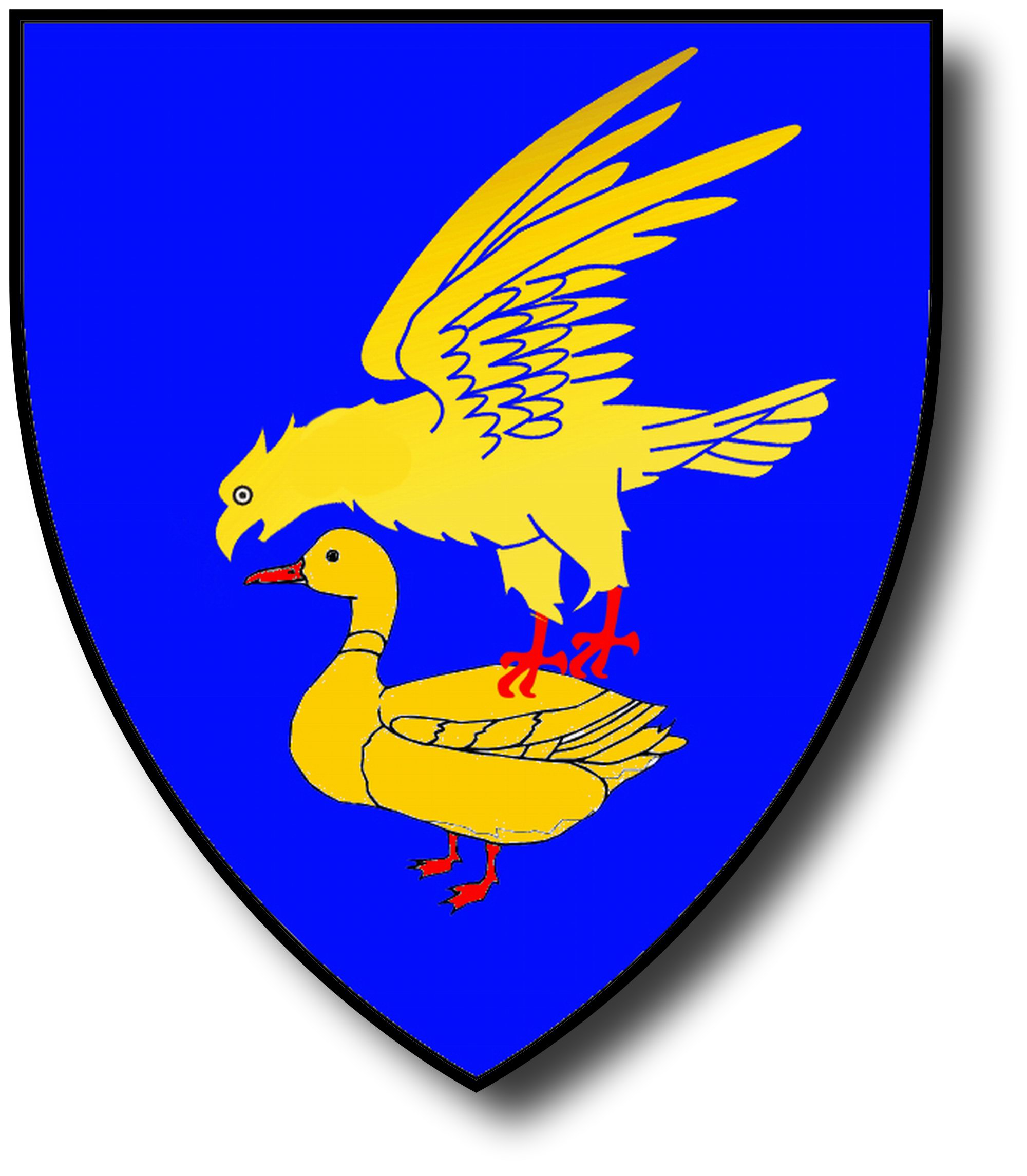
Coat of arms of the Telegdi family

Catherine Telegdi of Kincstartó (Hungarian: Katalin Telegdi de Kincstartó) (1492–1547) was a Hungarian noblewoman, the daughter of royal treasurer Stephen Telegdi de Telegd and Margit Bebek de Pelsőcz.

== Family ==
Catherine Telegdi married before 1516 to Stephen VIII Báthory, who acted as Governor of the Dukedom of Transylvania. They had eight children from this marriage:

- Nicholas, mentioned in 1516,
- Catharine, mentioned in 1516,
- Andrew (d. 1563),
- Sophia, wife of Demeter Csáky de Kőrösszegh,
- Anna (1537–1570), the mother of the "Blood Countess" Elizabeth Báthory,
- Elizabeth (1540-1562), wife of Lajos Pekry de Petrovina and László Kerecsélyi de Kányaföld,
- Christopher (1530–1581), who governed Transylvania in the absence of his younger brother Stefan,
- Stephen (1533–1586), who became Voivode (and later Prince) of Transylvania and King of Poland.

== Sources ==
- Derwich M. (red.), Polska. Dzieje cywilizacji i narodu. Monarchia Jagiellonów 1399-1586, Wydawnictwo Dolnośląskie, Warszawa – Wrocław 2003, ISBN 83-7384-018-4, s. 227.
