= Christopher Báthory =

Voivode of Transylvania (1530–1581)

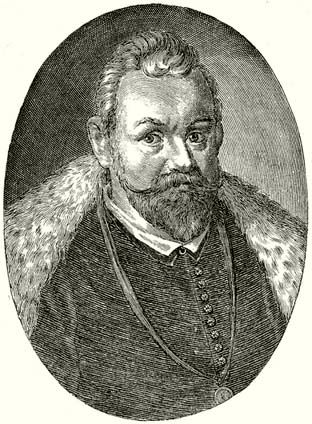
- Christopher depicted in Franz Christoph Khevenhüller's Conterfet Kupfferstich

Voivode of Transylvania
- Reign: 14 January 1576 – 27 May 1581
- Predecessor: Stephen Báthory
- Successor: Sigismund Báthory
- Born: 1530; Szilágysomlyó, Kingdom of Hungary (now Șimleu Silvaniei, Romania)
- Died: 27 May 1581 (aged 50–51); Gyulafehérvár, Principality of Transylvania (today Alba Iulia, Romania)
- Buried: Jesuit Church, Gyulafehérvár
- Noble family: House of Báthory
- Spouses: Catherina Danicska; Elisabeth Bocskai
- Issue: Balthasar; Nicholas; Griselda; Sigismund
- Father: Stephen VIII Báthory
- Mother: Catherine Telegdi

Christopher Báthory (Hungarian: Báthory Kristóf; 1530 – 27 May 1581) was voivode of Transylvania from 1576 to 1581. He was a younger son of Stephen Báthory of Somlyó. Christopher's career began during the reign of Queen Isabella Jagiellon, who administered the eastern territories of the Kingdom of Hungary on behalf of her son, John Sigismund Zápolya, from 1556 to 1559. He was one of the commanders of John Sigismund's army in the early 1560s.

Christopher's brother, Stephen Báthory, who succeeded John Sigismund in 1571, made Christopher captain of Várad (now Oradea in Romania). After being elected King of Poland, Stephen Báthory adopted the title of Prince of Transylvania and made Christopher voivode in 1576. Christopher cooperated with Márton Berzeviczy, whom his brother appointed to supervise the administration of the Principality of Transylvania as the head of the Transylvanian chancellery at Kraków. Christopher ordered the imprisonment of Ferenc Dávid, a leading theologian of the Unitarian Church of Transylvania, who started to condemn the adoration of Jesus. He supported his brother's efforts to settle the Jesuits in Transylvania.

== Early life ==
Christopher was the third of the four sons of Stephen Báthory of Somlyó and Catherine Telegdi. His father was a supporter of John Zápolya, King of Hungary, who made him voivode of Transylvania in February 1530. Christopher was born in Báthorys' castle at Szilágysomlyó (now Șimleu Silvaniei in Romania) in the same year. His father died in 1534.

His brother, Andrew, and their kinsman, Tamás Nádasdy, took charge of Christopher's education. Christopher visited England, France, Italy, Spain, and the Holy Roman Empire in his youth. He also served as a page in Emperor Charles V's court.

== Career ==
Christopher entered the service of John Zápolya's widow, Isabella Jagiellon, in the late 1550s. At the time, Isabella administered the eastern territories of the Kingdom of Hungary on behalf of her son, John Sigismund Zápolya. She wanted to persuade Henry II of France to withdraw his troops from three fortresses that the Ottomans had captured in Banat, so she sent Christopher to France to start negotiations in 1557.

John Sigismund took charge of the administration of his realm after his mother died on 15 November 1559. He retained his mother's advisors, including Christopher who became one of his most influential officials. After the rebellion of Melchior Balassa, Christopher persuaded John Sigismund to fight for his realm instead of fleeing to Poland in 1562. Christopher was one of the commanders of John Sigismund's troops during the ensuing war against the Habsburg rulers of the western territories of the Kingdom of Hungary, Ferdinand and Maximilian, who tried to reunite the kingdom under their rule. Christopher defeated Maximilian's commander, Lazarus von Schwendi, forcing him to lift the siege of Huszt (now Khust in Ukraine) in 1565.

After the death of John Sigismund, the Diet of Transylvania elected Christopher's younger brother, Stephen Báthory, voivode (or ruler) on 25 May 1571. Stephen made Christopher captain of Várad (now Oradea in Romania). The following year, the Ottoman Sultan, Selim II (who was the overlord of Transylvania), acknowledged the hereditary right of the Báthory family to rule the province.

== Reign ==
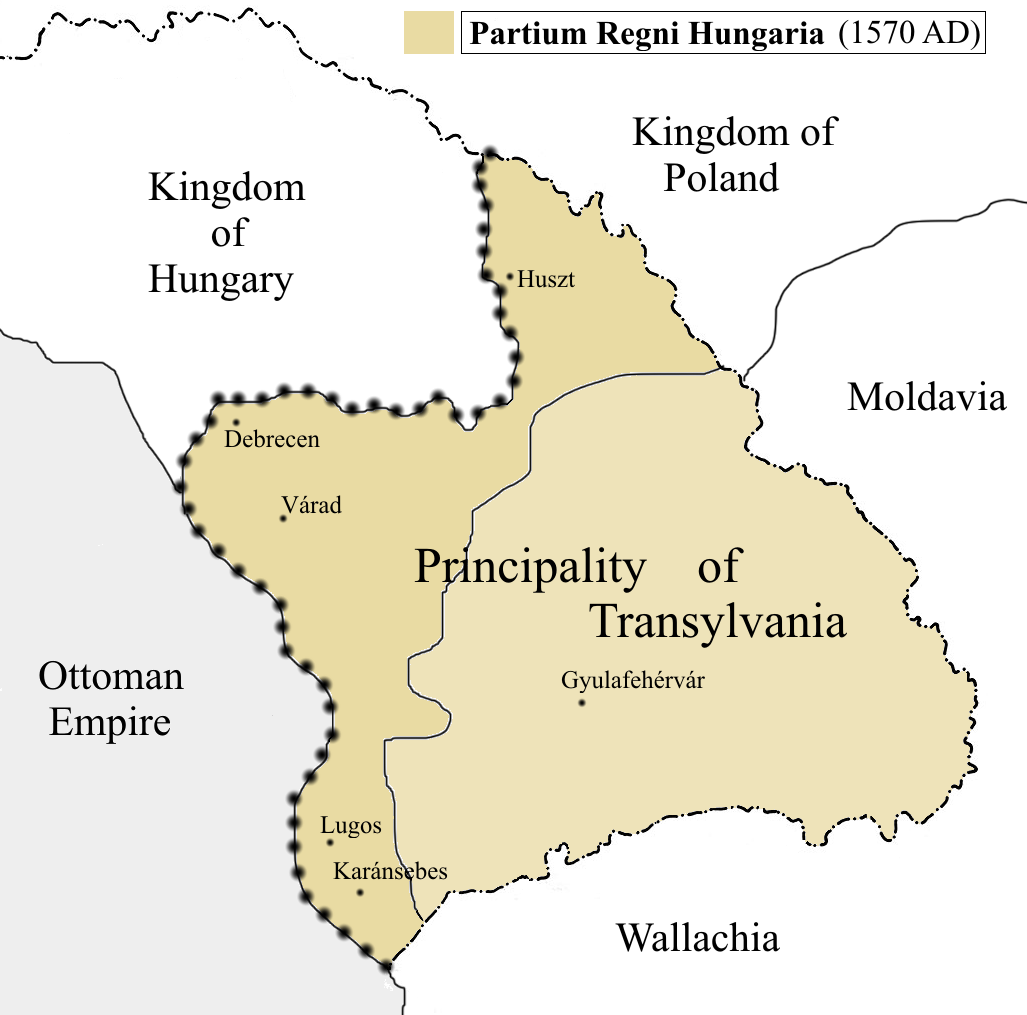
Principality of Transylvania in 1570

Stephen Báthory was elected King of Poland on 15 December 1575. He adopted the title of Prince of Transylvania and made Christopher voivode on 14 January 1576. An Ottoman delegation confirmed Christopher's appointment at the Diet in Gyulafehérvár (now Alba Iulia in Romania) in July. The sultan's charter (or ahidnâme) sent to Christopher emphasized that he should keep the peace along the frontiers. Stephen set up a separate chancellery in Kraków to keep an eye on the administration of Transylvania. The head of the new chancellery, Márton Berzeviczy, and Christopher cooperated closely.

Anti-Trinitarian preachers began to condemn the worshiping of Jesus in Partium and Székely Land in 1576, although the Diet had already forbade all doctrinal innovations. Ferenc Dávid, the most influential leader of the Unitarian Church of Transylvania, openly joined the dissenters in the autumn of 1578. Christopher invited Fausto Sozzini, a leading Anti-Trinitarian theologian, to Transylvania to convince Dávid that the new teaching was erroneous. Since Dávid refused to obey, Christopher held a Diet and the "Three Nations" (including the Unitarian delegates) ordered Dávid's imprisonment. Christopher also supported his brother's attempts to strengthen the position of the Roman Catholic Church in Transylvania. He granted estates to the Jesuits to promote the establishment of a college in Kolozsvár (now Cluj-Napoca in Romania) on 5 May 1579.

Christopher fell seriously ill after his second wife, Elisabeth Bocskai, died in early 1581. After a false rumor about Christopher's death reached Istanbul, Koca Sinan Pasha proposed Transylvania to Pál Márkházy whom Christopher had been forced into exile. Although Christopher's only surviving son Sigismund was still a minor, the Diet elected him as voivode before Christopher's death, because they wanted to prevent the appointment of Márkházy. Christopher died in Gyulafehérvár on 27 May 1581. He was buried in the Jesuits' church in Gyulafehérvár, almost two years later, on 14 March 1583.

== Family ==
Ancestors of Christopher Báthory

8. Stephen Báthory
4. Miklós Báthory
9. Dorothea Várdai
2. Stephen VIII Báthory
1. Christopher Báthory
3. Catherine Telegdi

Christopher's first wife, Catherina Danicska, was a Polish noblewoman, but only the Hungarian form of her name is known. Their eldest son, Balthasar Báthory, moved to Kraków shortly after Stephen Báthory was crowned King of Poland; he drowned in the Vistula River in May 1577 at the age of 22. Christopher's and Catherina's second son, Nicholas, was born in 1567 and died in 1576.

Christopher's second wife, Elisabeth Bocskai, was a Calvinist noblewoman. Their first child, Cristina (or Griselda), was born in 1569. She was given in marriage to Jan Zamoyski, Chancellor of Poland, in 1583. Christopher's youngest son, Sigismund, was born in 1573.

== Sources ==
- Barta, Gábor (1994). "The Emergence of the Principality and its First Crises (1526–1606)". In Köpeczi, Béla; Barta, Gábor; Bóna, István; Makkai, László; Szász, Zoltán; Borus, Judit (eds.). History of Transylvania. Akadémiai Kiadó. pp. 247–300. ISBN 963-05-6703-2.
- Felezeu, Călin (2009). "The International Political Background (1541–1699); The Legal Status of the Principality of Transylvania in Its Relations with the Ottoman Porte". In Pop, Ioan-Aurel; Nägler, Thomas; Magyari, András (eds.). The History of Transylvania, Vo. II (From 1541 to 1711). Romanian Academy, Center for Transylvanian Studies. pp. 15–73. ISBN 978-973-7784-04-9.
- Granasztói, György (1981). "A három részre szakadt ország és a török kiűzése (1557–1605)". In Benda, Kálmán; Péter, Katalin (eds.). Magyarország történeti kronológiája, II: 1526–1848 [Historical Chronology of Hungary, Volume I: 1526–1848] (in Hungarian). Akadémiai Kiadó. pp. 390–430. ISBN 963-05-2662-X.
- Horn, Ildikó (2002). Báthory András [Andrew Báthory] (in Hungarian). Új Mandátum. ISBN 963-9336-51-3.
- Keul, István (2009). Early Modern Religious Communities in East-Central Europe: Ethnic Diversity, Denominational Plurality, and Corporative Politics in the Principality of Transylvania (1526–1691). Brill. ISBN 978-90-04-17652-2.
- Markó, László (2006). A magyar állam főméltóságai Szent Istvántól napjainkig: Életrajzi Lexikon [Great Officers of State in Hungary from King Saint Stephen to Our Days: A Biographical Encyclopedia] (in Hungarian). Helikon Kiadó. ISBN 963-547-085-1.
- Papp, Sándor (2004). "From a Transylvanian principality to an Ottoman sanjak: The life of Pál Márkházi, a Hungarian renegade" (PDF). Chronica. 4: 57–67. ISSN 1588-2039. Archived (PDF) from the original on 2022-01-29.
- Szabó, Péter Károly (2012). "Báthory Kristóf". In Gujdár, Noémi; Szatmáry, Nóra (eds.). Magyar királyok nagykönyve: Uralkodóink, kormányzóink és az erdélyi fejedelmek életének és tetteinek képes története [Encyclopedia of the Kings of Hungary: An Illustrated History of the Life and Deeds of Our Monarchs, Regents and the Princes of Transylvania] (in Hungarian). Reader's Digest. pp. 182–183. ISBN 978-963-289-214-6.
- Szegedi, Edit (2009). "The Birth and Evolution of the Principality of Transylvania (1541–1690)". In Pop, Ioan-Aurel; Nägler, Thomas; Magyari, András (eds.). The History of Transylvania, Vo. II (From 1541 to 1711). Romanian Academy, Center for Transylvanian Studies. pp. 99–111. ISBN 978-973-7784-04-9.

Christopher Báthory House of Báthory Born: 1530 Died: 27 May 1581
Political offices
Preceded by Stephen Báthory	Voivode of Transylvania; 1576–1581	Succeeded by Sigismund Báthory
