= Siege of Velikiye Luki =

- Part of the Livonian War
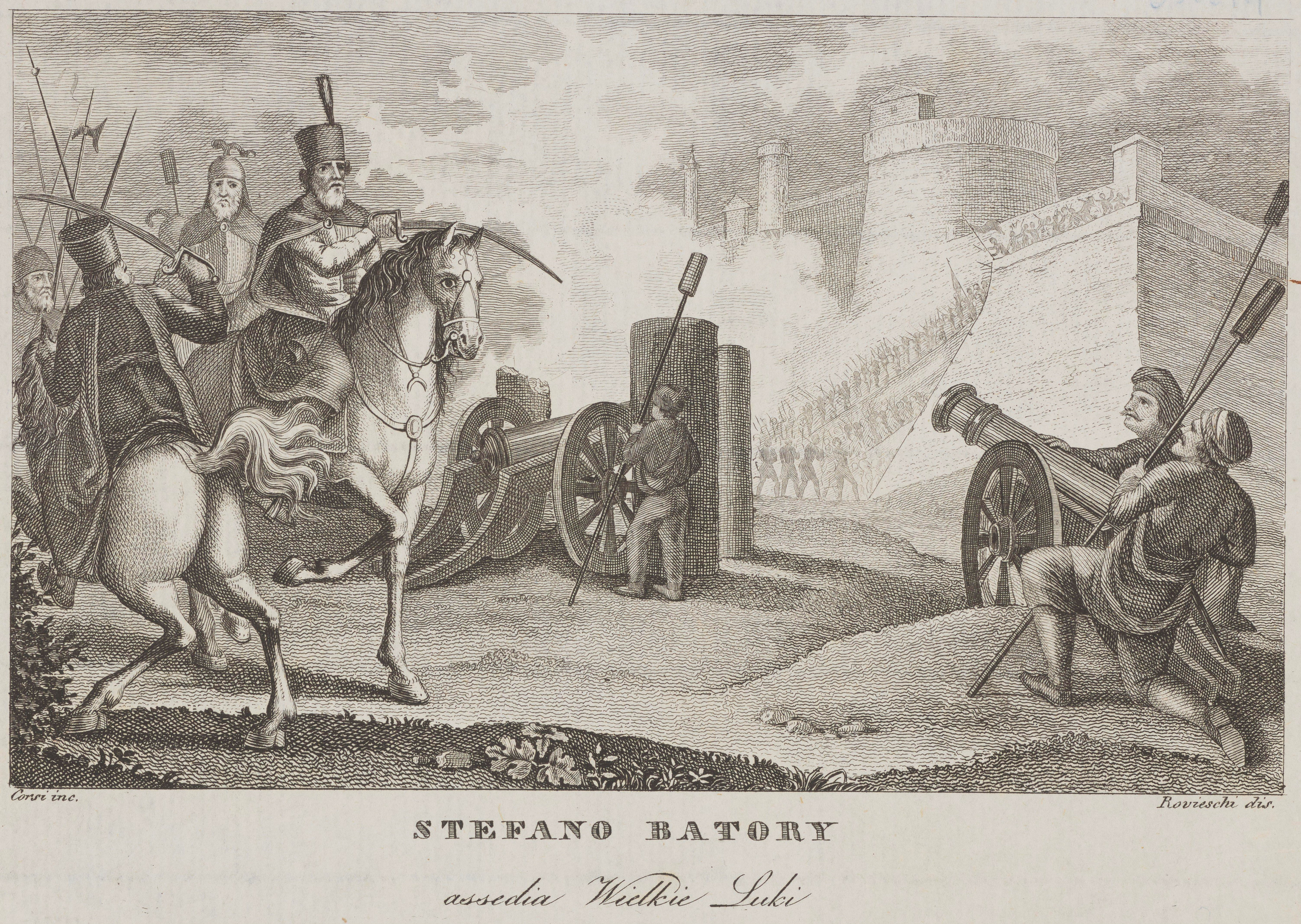
- Francesco Corsi: Stephan Bathory sieging Wielkie Luki (1831)
Date	1–5 September 1580
Location	Velikiye Luki, Russia 56°20′31″N 30°30′25″E
Result	Polish-Lithuanian victory

Belligerents
Polish–Lithuanian Commonwealth; Principality of Transylvania and foreign mercenaries	Tsardom of Russia

Commanders and leaders
King Stephen Báthory	Ivan Vasiliyevich †

Strength
~50,000	~6,000 or 7,000

Casualties and losses
About 200 killed	Thousands of soldiers and civilians killed

The siege of Velikiye Luki was one of the battles of Livonian campaign of Stephen Báthory. It took place between 1 and 5 September 1580, and ended in Polish-Lithuanian victory. Forces of the Polish–Lithuanian Commonwealth captured the Russian fortress of Velikiye Luki.

On 18 July 1580, King Stefan Batory called a council of his hetman, during which two plans were designed - either to march towards Pskov, or to attack Smolensk. After a discussion, a compromise was achieved, in which capture of Russian-held Velikiye Luki was designed. After the siege, Polish-Lithuanian forces were to march towards Pskov, to cut links between Livonia and Russia.

The fortress of Velikiye Luki, located by the Lovat River, was made of wood and earth. Next to it, a wooden town stood, which was burned by the Commonwealth forces so as it would not give cover to the defenders. The siege began on September 1 with an artillery barrage and infantry attack. Velikiye Luki was set in flames, and the still burning fortress surrendered on September 5. Hungarian mercenaries, who were first to enter it, began widespread looting, not paying attention to the fire, which in the meantime reached the gunpowder magazine. The magazine exploded, killing app. 200 Poles and Hungarians, together with defenders of the fortress.

== See also ==
- Muscovite–Lithuanian Wars

== Sources ==
- J. Natanson-Leski, Epoka Stefana Batorego w dziejach granicy wschodniej Rzeczypospolitej, Warszawa 1930, s. 64.
