= Battle of Brașov =

Battle during the Long Turkish War

Battle of Braşov Battle of Kronstadt
- Part of the Long War (Ottoman wars)
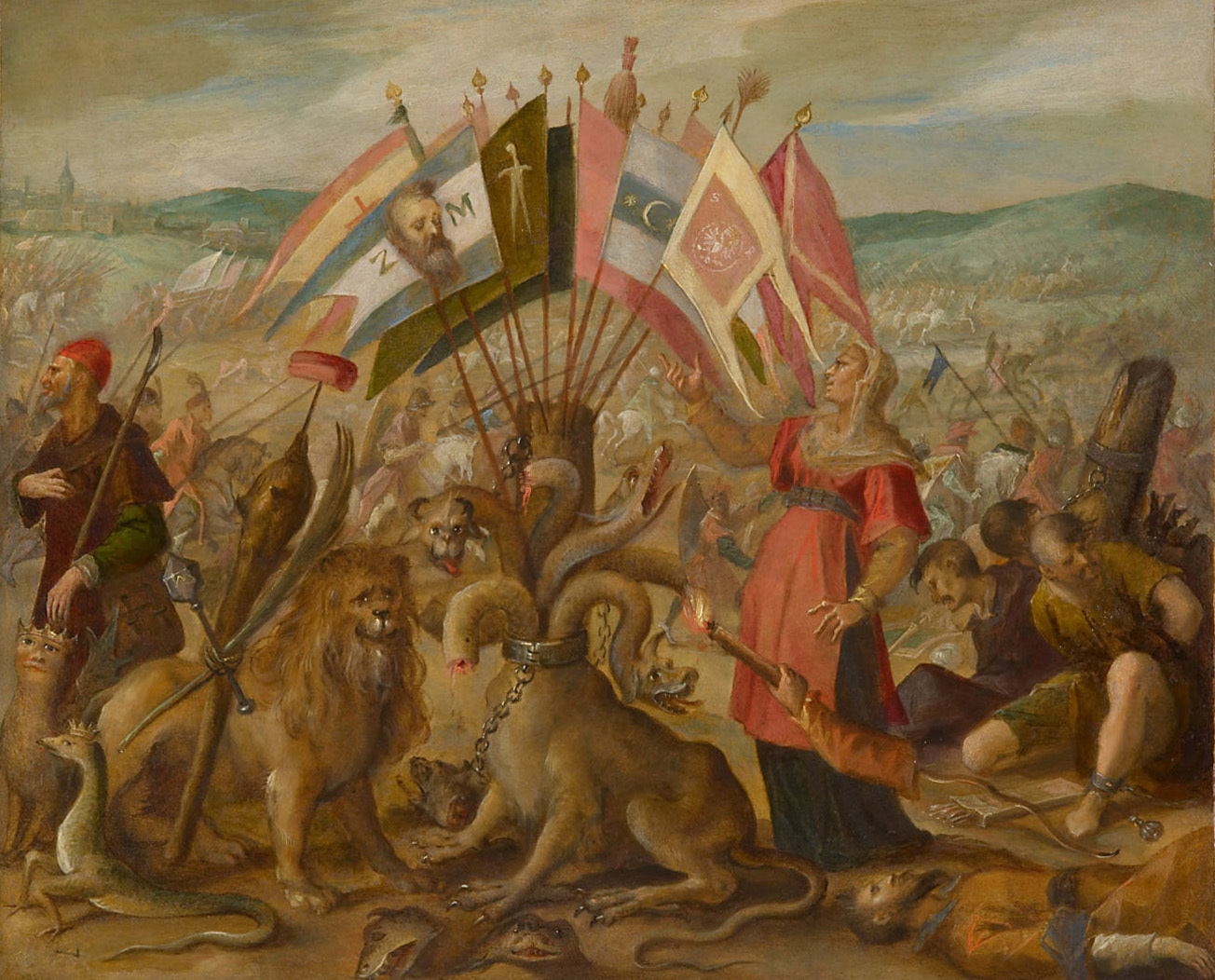
- Battle of Braşov. Some flags were captured in the Battle of Guruslău (1601) by Michael and Basta. By Hans von Aachen, 1603–1604
Date	July 17, 1603
Location	Brașov 45°39′N 25°36′E
Result	Wallachian victory

Belligerents
Wallachia; Supported by: Habsburg Monarchy; Pro-monarchy Székelys	Principality of Transylvania Supported by: Ottoman Empire; Tatars

Commanders and leaders
Radu Șerban	Mózes Székely †

The Battle of Brașov (German: Schlacht bei Kronstadt; Hungarian: Brassói csata; Romanian: Bătălia de la Brașov) was fought on July 17, 1603, between the troops of Wallachia led by Radu Șerban backed up by the Habsburg monarchy on one side and the Transylvanian troops led by Mózes Székely backed up by the Ottoman Empire and Crimean Khanate on the other side.

Mózes Székely was killed on the battlefield, and the Wallachian lord Radu Șerban became ruler of Transylvania until September 1603, when Giorgio Basta and the imperial commissioners took control of the country in the name of the emperor.

== Context ==
The decade previous to the battle was a tumultuous one for Transylvania, during which the Habsburg Empire seemed to be losing its grasp on the province. Prince Sigismund Báthory was nominally elected to be its leader in 1581, at the age of nine, and between 1593 and 1601 he had abdicated the throne three times in favour of other members of the family in order to please the imperial interests.

After brief spells during which Transylvania was controlled by Wallachian prince Michael the Brave and subsequently by mercenaries of Habsburg general Giorgio Basta, military leader Moses Székely instigated the native Transylvanian forces to rebel and, with the support of Turkish-Tartarian auxiliary forces proclaimed himself Prince of Transylvania on 8 May 1603.

Székely's attempt to replace the Habsburg presence in Transylvania with a government that was friendly to the Ottoman Empire was unacceptable to Radu Șerban, who ”could not allow Wallachia to be caught in a vice between the Ottoman Empire south of the Danube and a Transylvania that swore fealty to it”. Much of the Transylvanian nobility sided with Șerban, against the excesses of the Ottoman-backed usurper, with Brașov itself remaining loyal to the Habsburg. The also pro-monarchy Székelys (Szeklers) of Háromszék and Csíkszék June 8, joined Radu Șerban's forces under captains Bedő and Máttyus (3,000 cavalry and infantry).

== Battle ==
In July 1603 several smaller Wallachian forces crossed the Carpathians and engaged in skirmishes with Mózes Székely's troops around Feldioara, resulting in an early strategic victory. Unsure of his chances in open battle against the bulk of the Wallachian army, Székely adopted a defensive posture, entrenching his army (consisting of 4000 Hungarians, 2000 Tatars, and 25 light cannons) near Râșnov in an improvised camp surrounded by linked carts. On the 15th of July Radu Șerban crossed the mountains and joined the rest of the forces. In total, the Wallachian army consisted of 10,000 men: two flanks of 2000 soldiers each and a main army of 6000 men led by Șerban himself. The left wing was led by the Hungarian György Rácz, while the right wing was led by the Serbian mercenary Deli Marko.

The main battle took place on 17 July, when the Wallachian troops attacked the defending camp. Following prolonged close combat, the defenders started suffering heavy losses and broke ranks, attempting to flee. Șerban gave the order to follow and cut down those who were trying to escape. This included Mózes Székely who, refusing to surrender, attempted to flee to Brașov to save his life, but Rácz's cavalry overtook him. The prince defended himself bravely, until finally a Székely cavalier named Katona Mihály seriously wounded him and Rácz beheaded him.

== Aftermath ==
Radu Șerban became ruler of Transylvania until September 1603. Despite initial fears from Giorgio Basta that Șerban would try to claim Transylvania for himself after the battle, mirroring Michael the Brave, Basta and the imperial commissioners took control of the country in the name of the emperor.

== Depictions ==
The Battle of Brașov is the most recent battle included in the Allegory of the Turkish War, a volume of oil sketches on parchment created by German painter Hans von Aachen around 1607, while he was acting as the court painter of Emperor Rudolf II.
