= Stephen Báthory =

Ruler of the Polish-Lithuanian Commonwealth from 1576 to 1586

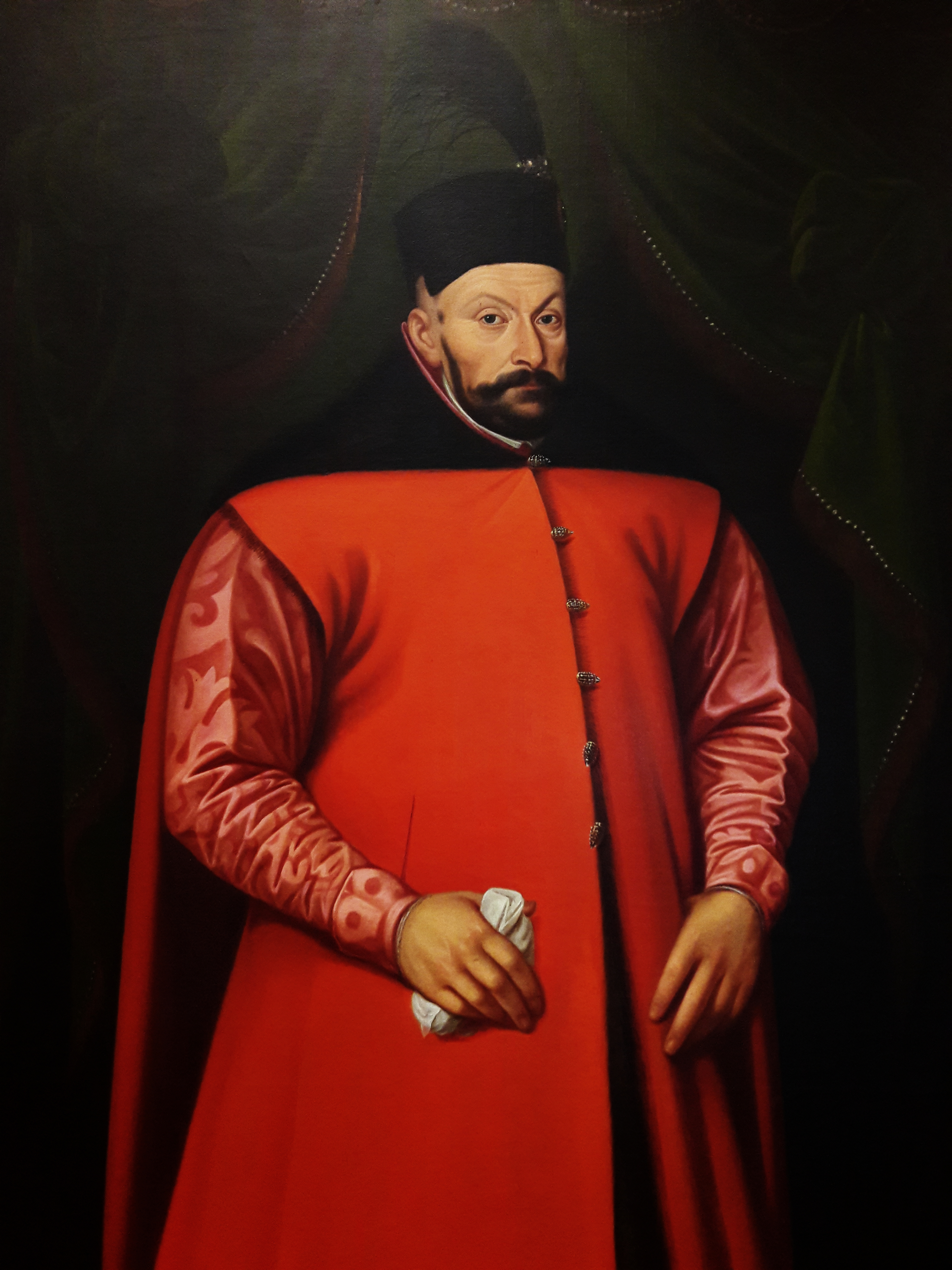
- A 19th-century copy of a portrait attributed to Martin Kober representing Stephen Báthory in decorative Sarmatian attire

King of Poland Grand Duke of Lithuania
- Reign: 1 May 1576 – 12 December 1586
- Coronation: 1 May 1576; Wawel Cathedral
- Predecessor: Anna Jagiellon
- Successor: Sigismund III
- Co-monarch: Anna Jagiellon

Prince of Transylvania
- Reign: 1571 – 1586
- Predecessor: John Sigismund Zápolya
- Successor: Sigismund Báthory
- Born: 27 September 1533; Szilágysomlyó, Eastern Hungarian Kingdom
- Died: 12 December 1586 (aged 53); Grodno, Polish–Lithuanian Commonwealth
- Burial: May 1588; Wawel Cathedral, Kraków
- Spouse: Anna Jagiellon (m. 1576)
- House: Báthory
- Father: Stephen Báthory of Somlyó
- Mother: Catherine Telegdi
- Religion: Roman Catholicism

Stephen Báthory (Hungarian: Báthory István; Polish: Stefan Batory; Lithuanian: Steponas Batoras; 27 September 1533 – 12 December 1586) was King of Poland and Grand Duke of Lithuania as well as Prince of Transylvania (1576–1586), after previously being Voivode of Transylvania (1571–1576).

The son of Stephen VIII Báthory and a member of the Hungarian Báthory noble family, Báthory was a ruler of Transylvania in the 1570s, defeating another challenger for that title, Gáspár Bekes.

In 1576, Báthory became the husband of Queen Anna Jagiellon and the third elected king of Poland. He worked closely with the chancellor Jan Zamoyski. The first years of his reign were focused on establishing power, defeating a fellow claimant to the throne, Maximilian II, Holy Roman Emperor, and quelling rebellions, most notably, the Gdańsk rebellion.

He reigned for only a decade, but is considered one of the most successful kings in Polish and Lithuanian history, particularly in the military realm. His signal achievement was his victorious campaign in Livonia against Russia in the middle part of his reign, in which he repulsed a Russian invasion of the Commonwealth borderlands and secured a highly favorable treaty of peace (the Peace of Jam Zapolski).

== Youth ==
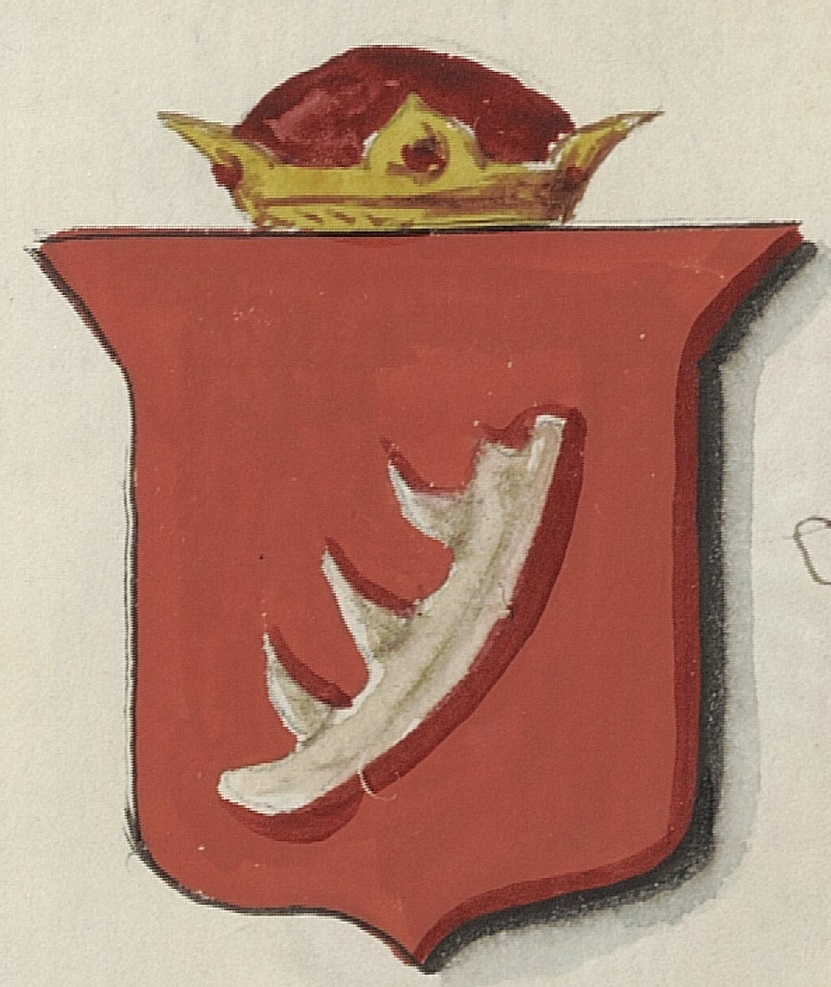
Personal coat of arms

Stephen Báthory was born on 27 September 1533 in the castle at Somlyó, also known as Szilágysomlyó (today's Șimleu Silvaniei). He was the son of Stephen VIII Báthory (d. 1534) of the noble Hungarian Báthory family and his wife Catherine Telegdi. He had at least five siblings: two brothers and three sisters.

Little is known about his childhood. Around 1549–1550, he briefly visited Italy and probably spent a few months attending lectures at the Padua University. Upon his return, he joined the army of Ferdinand I, Holy Roman Emperor, and took part in his military struggle against the Turks. Some time after 1553, Báthory was captured by the Turks, and after Ferdinand I refused to pay his ransom, joined the opposing side, supporting John II Sigismund Zápolya in his struggle for power in the Eastern Hungarian Kingdom. As Zápolya's supporter, Báthory acted both as a feudal lord, military commander and a diplomat. During one of his trips to Vienna, he was put under house arrest for two years. During this time, he fell out of favor at Zápolya's court, and his position was largely assumed by another Hungarian noble, Gáspár Bekes. Báthory briefly retired from politics, but he still wielded considerable influence and was seen as a possible successor to Zápolya.

After Zápolya's death in 1571, the Transylvanian estates elected Báthory Voivode of Transylvania. Bekes, supported by the Habsburgs, disputed his election, but by 1573, Báthory emerged victorious in the resulting civil war and drove Bekes out of Transylvania. He subsequently attempted to play the Ottomans and the Holy Roman Empire against one another in an attempt to strengthen the Transylvania position.

== Elected king ==
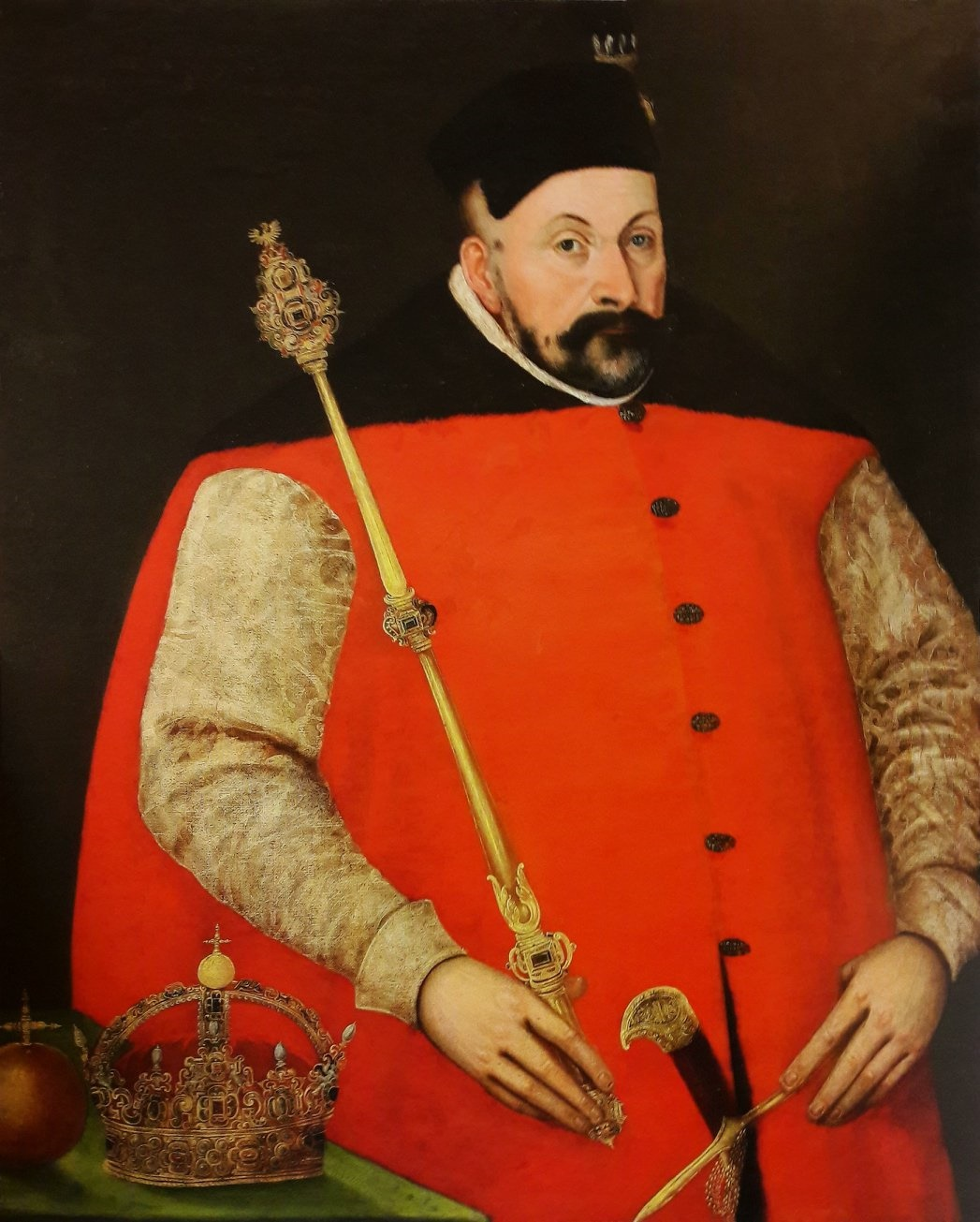
Stephen Báthory as King of Poland with a Mannerist crown from about 1584, most probably created for him in Gdańsk after Willem van den Blocke's design.

In 1572, the throne of the Polish–Lithuanian Commonwealth, at the time the largest and one of the most populous states in Europe, was vacated when King Sigismund II Augustus died without heirs. The Sejm was given the power to elect a new king, and in the 1573 Polish–Lithuanian royal election chose Henry III of France; Henry soon ascended the French throne and forfeited the Polish-Lithuanian one by returning to France. Báthory decided to enter into the election; in the meantime he had to defeat another attempt by Bekes to challenge his authority in Transylvania, which he did by defeating Bekes at the Battle of Kerelőszentpál.

On 12 December 1575, after an interregnum of roughly one and a half years, primate of Poland Jakub Uchański, representing a pro-Habsburg faction, declared Archduke Maximilian III as the new monarch. However, Chancellor Jan Zamoyski, Piotr Zborowski and other opponents of the Habsburgs argued against a Habsburg king, fearing the political power of a native Polish king. Zborowski in particular supported electing a princely or ducal ruler. Bathory also pledged several bribes, including 200,000 florins and ransoms for Polish captives taken by the Tatars. After a heated discussion, it was decided that Anna Jagiellon, sister of the former King Sigismund II Augustus, should be elected "King" and marry Stephen Báthory. In January 1576 Báthory passed the mantle of voivode of Transylvania to his brother Christopher Báthory and departed for Poland. On 1 May 1576 Báthory married Anna and was crowned King of Poland and Grand duke of Lithuania. After being chosen as king in the 1576 Polish–Lithuanian royal election, Báthory also began using the title of the prince of Transylvania.

== Establishing power ==
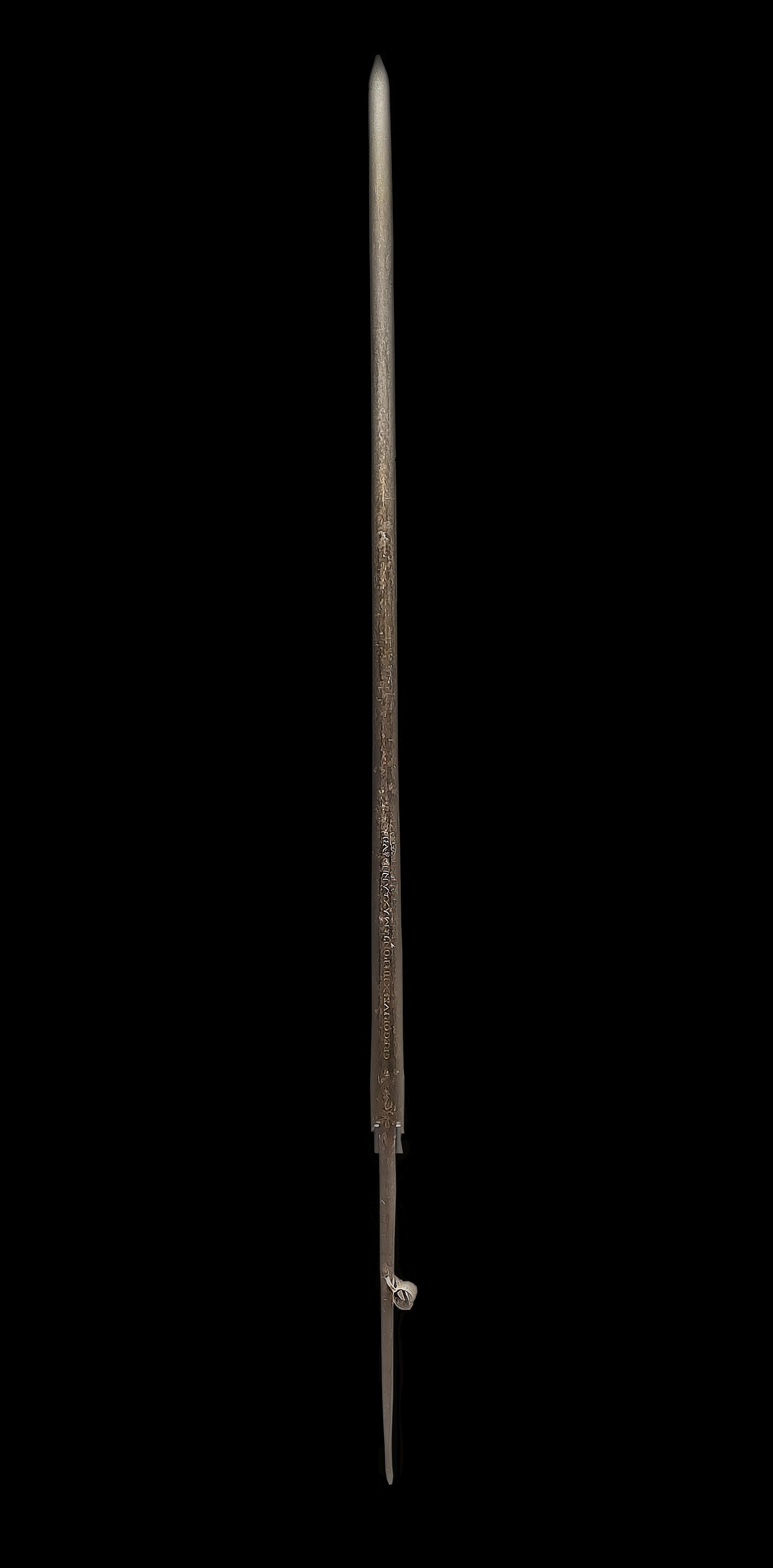
Blade of the blessed sword received by Stephen Báthory in 1580 from Pope Gregory XIII for his struggles against Turks and Tatars. It was deposited in the royal treasury in Kraków.

Báthory's position was at first extremely difficult, as there was still some opposition to his election. Emperor Maximilian, insisting on his earlier election, fostered internal opposition and prepared to enforce his claim by military action. At first, the representatives of the Grand Duchy of Lithuania refused to recognize Báthory as a grand duke, and demanded concessions – that he return the estates of his wife Anne to the Lithuanian treasury, hold Sejm conventions in both Lithuania and Poland, and reserve the highest governmental official offices in Lithuania for Lithuanians. He accepted the conditions. In June, Báthory was recognized as Grand Duke of Lithuania. (Note: The lands and territories he ruled were usually named one after another in written sources: Stephanus Dei gratia rex Poloniae et magnus dux Lithuaniae, Russiae, Prussiae, Masoviae, Samogitiae, Kiioviae, Voliniae, Podlachiae, Livoniaeque, necnon. princeps Transylvaniae. in Latin.) On 29 May 1580, a ceremony was held in the Vilnius Cathedral during which bishop Merkelis Giedraitis presented Báthory a decorated sword and a hat adorned with pearls (both were sanctified by Pope Gregory XIII himself), while this ceremony manifested the sovereignty of the Grand Duchy of Lithuania and had the meaning of elevation of the new Grand Duke of Lithuania, this way ignoring the stipulations of the Union of Lublin. The Báthory's ceremony of 29 May 1580 coincided with the nobles of the Grand Duchy of Lithuania (e.g. Mikołaj "the Red" Radziwiłł, Eustachy Wołłowicz, Jan Karol Chodkiewicz, Konstanty Wasyl Ostrogski) initial demands before the Union of Lubin to have a separate declaration act of the Grand Duke of Lithuania in Vilnius.

With Lithuania secure, the other major region refusing to recognize his election was Prussia. Maximilian's sudden death improved Báthory's situation, but the city of Danzig (Gdańsk) still refused to recognize his election without significant concessions. The Hanseatic League city, bolstered by its immense wealth, fortifications, and the secret support of Maximilian, had supported the Emperor's election and decided not to recognize Báthory as the legitimate ruler. The resulting conflict was known as the Danzig rebellion. Most armed opposition collapsed when the prolonged Siege of Danzig by Báthory's forces was lifted as an agreement was reached. The Danzig army was utterly defeated in a field battle on 17 April 1577. However, since Báthory's armies were unable to take the city by force, a compromise was reached. In exchange for some of Danzig's demands being favorably reviewed, the city recognised Báthory as ruler of Poland and paid the sum of 200,000 zlotys in gold as compensation. Tying up the administration of the Commonwealth's northern provinces, in February 1578 he acknowledged George Frederick as the ruler of Duchy of Prussia, receiving his feudal tribute.

== Policies ==
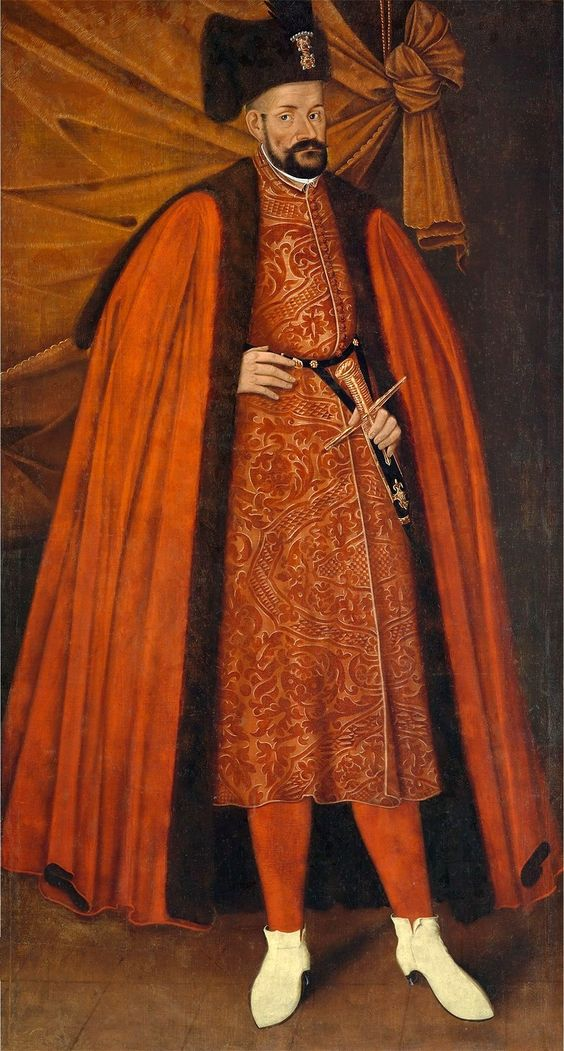
King Stephen in Ottoman clothes, 1585

After securing control over the Commonwealth, Báthory had a chance to devote himself to strengthening his authority, in which he was supported by his chancellor Jan Zamoyski, who would soon become one of the king's most trusted advisers. Báthory reorganised the judiciary by the formation of legal tribunals (the Crown Tribunal in 1578 and the Lithuanian Tribunal in 1581). While this somewhat weakened the royal position, it was of little concern to Báthory, as the loss of power was not significant in the short term, and he was more concerned with the hereditary Hungarian throne. In exchange, the Sejm allowed him to raise taxes and push a number of reforms strengthening the military, including the establishment of the piechota wybraniecka, an infantry formation composed of peasants. Many of his projects aimed to modernise the Commonwealth army, reforming it in a model of Hungarian troops of Transylvania. He also founded the Academy of Vilnius, the third university in the Commonwealth, transforming what had been a Jesuit college into a major university. He founded several other Jesuit colleges, and was active in propagating Catholicism, while at the same time being respectful of the Commonwealth policy of religious tolerance, issuing a number of decrees offering protection to Polish Jews, and denouncing any religious violence.

In external relations, Báthory sought peace through strong alliances. Though remaining distrustful of the Habsburgs, he maintained the tradition of good relations that the Commonwealth enjoyed with its Western neighbor and confirmed past treaties between the Commonwealth and Holy Roman Empire with diplomatic missions received by Maximilian's successor, Rudolf II. The troublesome south-eastern border with the Ottoman Empire was temporarily quelled by truces signed in July 1577 and April 1579. The Sejm of January 1578 gathered in Warsaw was persuaded to grant Báthory subsidies for the inevitable war against Muscovy.

A number of his trusted advisers were Hungarian, and he remained interested in Hungarian politics. In his last years, Báthory, with Pope Gregory XIII's approval, made a plan with Antonio Possevino for the liberation of Ottoman Hungary by a well organised (mostly Polish) Christian army, and the creation of a strong and independent Hungarian-Polish union under his rule. However, the unfavorable international situation did not allow him to significantly advance any of his plans in that area. In addition to Hungarian, he was well versed in Latin, and spoke Italian and German; he never learned the Polish language.

In his personal life, he was described as rather frugal in his personal expenditures, with hunting and reading as his favorite pastimes.

== War with Russia ==
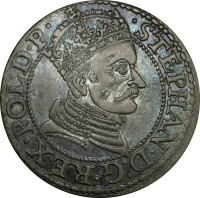
Polish coin with likeness of Báthory

Before Báthory's election to the throne of the Commonwealth, Ivan the Terrible of Russia had begun encroaching on its sphere of interest in the northeast, eventually invading the Commonwealth borderlands in Livonia; the conflict would grow to involve a number of nearby powers (outside Russia and Poland-Lithuania, also Sweden, the Kingdom of Livonia and Denmark-Norway). Each of them was vying for control of Livonia, and the resulting conflict, lasting for several years, became known as the Livonian War. By 1577, Ivan was in control of most of the disputed territory, but his conquest was short-lived. In 1578, Commonwealth forces scored a number of victories in Livonia and began pushing Ivan's forces back; this marked the turning point in the war. Báthory, together with his chancellor Zamoyski, led the army of the Commonwealth in a series of decisive campaigns taking Polotsk in 1579 and Velikiye Luki in 1580.

In 1581, Stephen penetrated once again into Russia and, on 22 August, laid siege to the city of Pskov. While the city held, on 13 December 1581, Ivan the Terrible began negotiations that concluded with the Truce of Jam Zapolski on 15 January 1582. The treaty was favorable to the Commonwealth, as Ivan ceded Polatsk, Veliz and most of the Duchy of Livonia in exchange for regaining Velikiye Luki and Nevel.

== Final years ==
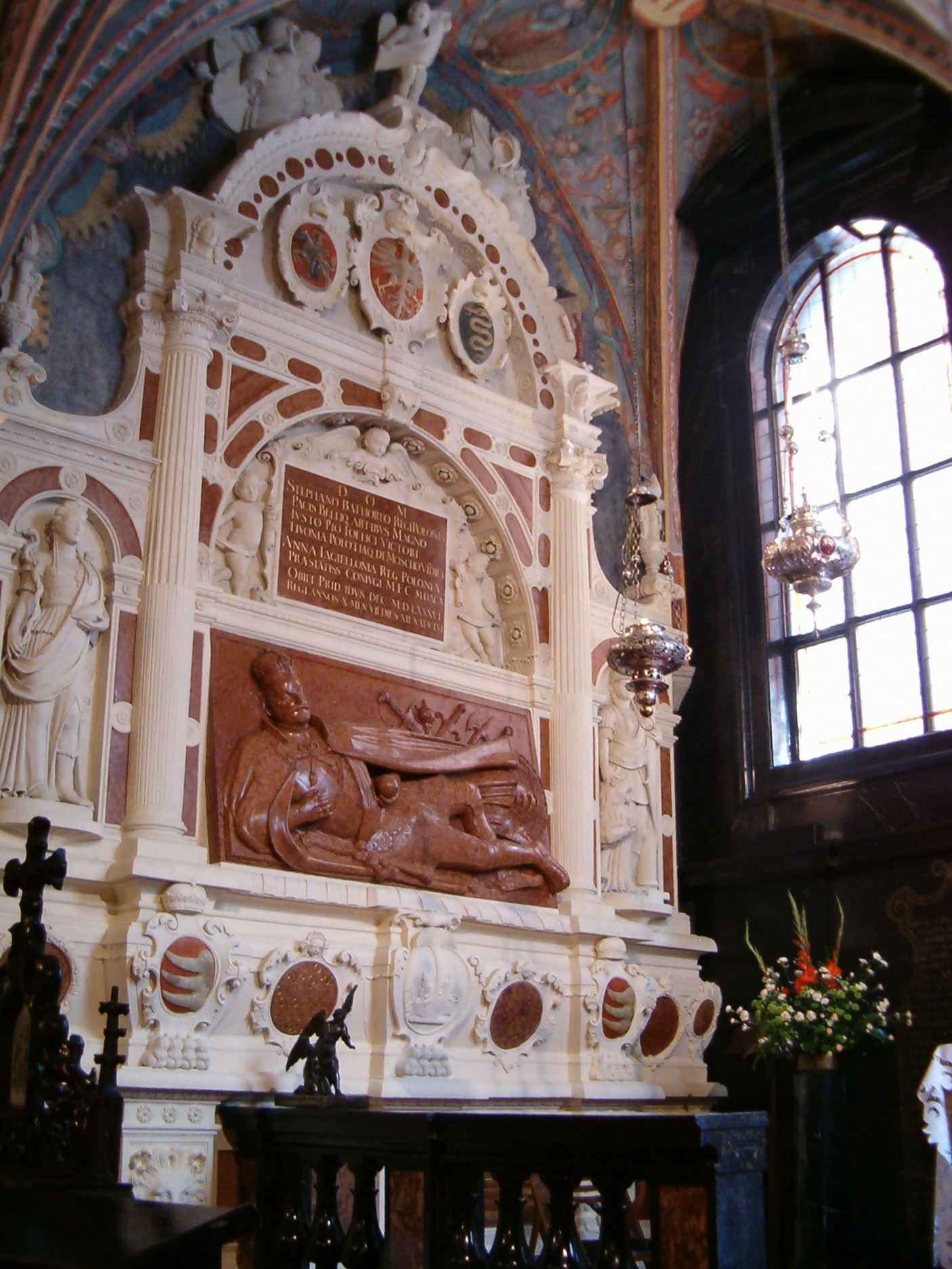
Bathory's tomb monument in the Wawel Cathedral

In 1584, Báthory allowed Zamoyski to execute Samuel Zborowski, whose death sentence for treason and murder had been pending for roughly a decade. This political conflict between Báthory and the Zborowski family, framed as the clash between the monarch and the nobility, would be a major recurring controversy in internal Polish politics for many years. In external politics, Báthory was considering another war with Russia, but his plans were delayed due to the lack of support from the Sejm, which refused to pass the requested tax raises.

Báthory's health had been declining for several years. He died on 12 December 1586. He had no legitimate children, though contemporary rumours suggested he might have had several illegitimate children. None of these rumours has been confirmed by modern historians. His death was followed by an interregnum of one year. Maximilian II's son, Maximilian III, Archduke of Austria, was elected king but was contested by the Swedish Sigismund III Vasa, who defeated Maximilian at the Byczyna and succeeded as ruler of the Commonwealth.

== Remembrance ==
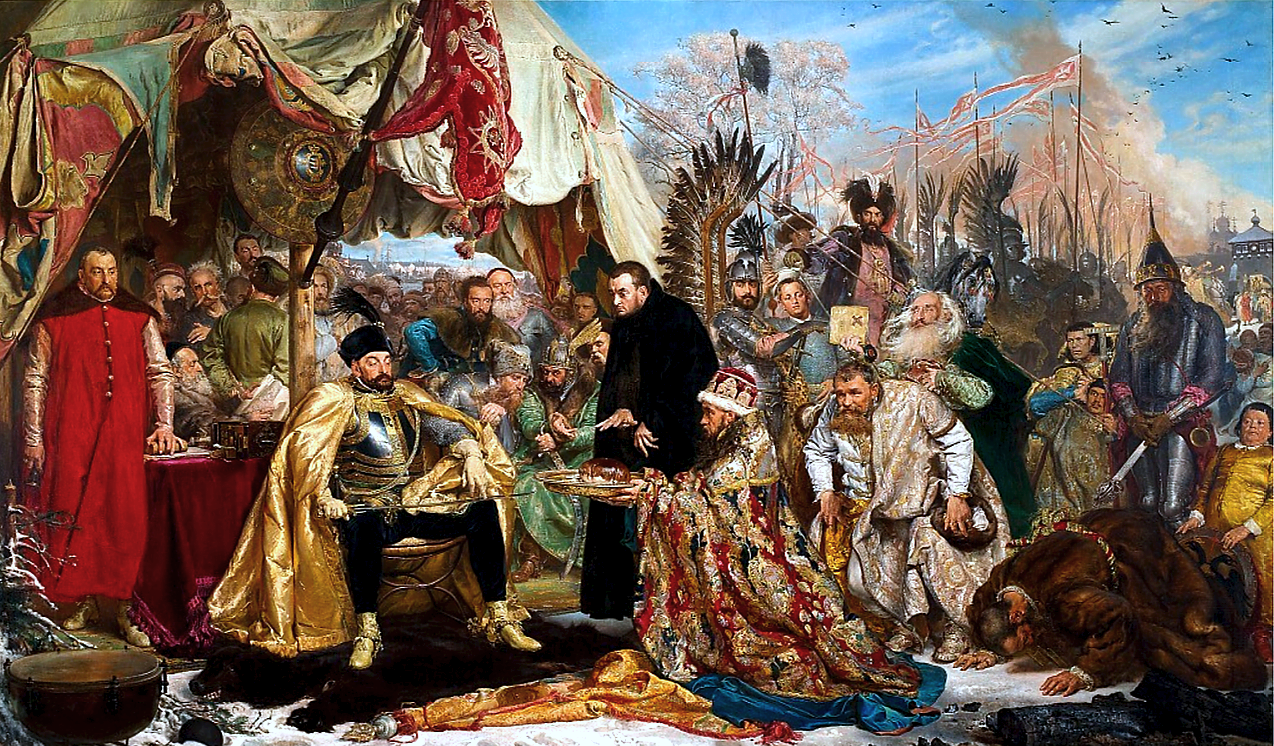
Báthory at Pskov, by Jan Matejko

Báthory actively promoted his legend, sponsoring many works about his life and achievements, from historical treatises to poetry. In his lifetime, he was featured in the works of Jan Kochanowski, Mikołaj Sęp Szarzyński and many others. He became a recurring character in Polish poetry and literature and featured as a central figure in poems, novels and drama by Jakub Jasiński, Józef Ignacy Kraszewski, Julian Ursyn Niemcewicz, Henryk Rzewuski and others. He has been a subject of numerous paintings, both during his life and posthumously. Among the painters who took him as a subject were Jan Matejko and Stanisław Wyspiański.

A statue of Báthory by Giovanni Ferrari was raised in 1789 in Padua, Italy, sponsored by the last monarch of the Commonwealth, Stanisław August Poniatowski. Other monuments to him include one in the Łazienki Palace (1795 by André Lebrun) and one in Sniatyn (1904, destroyed in 1939). He was a patron of the Vilnius University (the university was named after him from 1919 to 1939) and several units in the Polish Army from 1919 to 1939. His name was borne by two 20th-century passenger ships of the Polish Merchant Navy, the MS Batory and TSS Stefan Batory. In modern Poland, he is the namesake of the Batory Steelmill, a nongovernmental Stefan Batory Foundation, the Polish 9th Armored Cavalry Brigade, and numerous Polish streets and schools. One of the districts of the town of Chorzów is named after him.

Immediately after his death, he was not fondly remembered in the Commonwealth. Many nobles took his behavior in the Zborowski affair and his domestic policies as indicating an interest in curtailing the nobility's Golden Freedoms and establishing an absolute monarchy. His contemporaries were also rankled by his favoritism toward Hungarians over nationals of the Commonwealth. He was also remembered, more trivially, for his Hungarian-style cap and saber (szabla batorówka).

His later resurgence in Polish memory and historiography can be traced to the 19th century era of partitions of Poland when the Polish-Lithuanian state lost its independence. He was remembered for his military triumphs and praised as an effective ruler by many, including John Baptist Albertrandi, Jerzy Samuel Bandtkie, Michał Bobrzyński, Józef Szujski and others. Though some historians like Tadeusz Korzon, Joachim Lelewel and Jędrzej Moraczewski remained more reserved, in 1887, Wincenty Zakrzewski noted that Báthory is "the darling of both the Polish public opinion and Polish historians". During the interwar period in the Second Polish Republic he was a cult figure, often compared – with the government's approval – to the contemporary dictator of Poland, Józef Piłsudski. After the Second World War, in the communist People's Republic of Poland, he became more of a controversial figure, with historians more ready to question his internal politics and attachment to Hungary. Nonetheless, his good image remained intact, reinforced by the positive views of a popular Polish historian of that period, Paweł Jasienica.

== See also ==
- History of Poland in the early modern period (1569–1795)
- Muscovite–Lithuanian Wars
- Nyírbátor

== Bibliography ==
- Jerzy Besala; Agnieszka Biedrzycka (2004–2005). "Stefan Batory". Polski Słownik Biograficzny (in Polish). Vol. XLIII.
- Winged Hussars, Radoslaw Sikora, Bartosz Musialowicz, BUM Magazine, October 2016.

Stephen Báthory House of Báthory Born: 27 September 1533 Died: 12 December 1586
Regnal titles
Vacant Title last held by István Dobó; Francis Kendi	Voivode of Transylvania; 1571–1576	Succeeded by Christopher Báthory
Vacant Title last held by John Sigismund Zápolya	Prince of Transylvania; 1576–1586	Succeeded by Sigismund Báthory
Preceded by Anna Jagiellon as sole monarch	King of Poland; Grand Duke of Lithuania; 1576–1586 with Anna Jagiellon	Succeeded by Sigismund III Vasa
Notes and references
1. Regnal Chronologies
