= Siege of Pskov =

Siege in Pskov, Russia during the Livonian War

- Part of the Livonian War
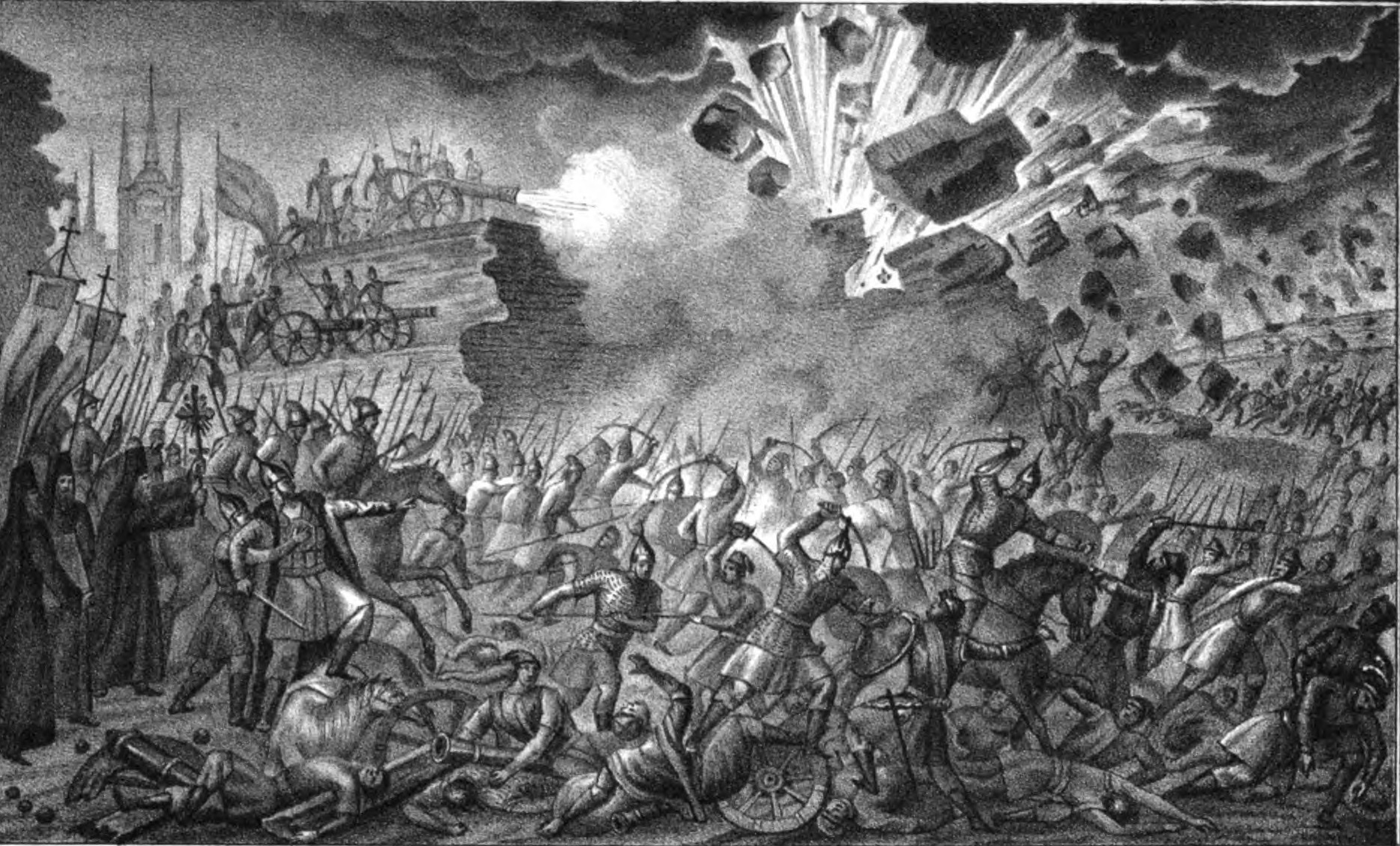
- A Siege of Pskov, an etching by Boris Chorikov for "Picturesque Karamzin, the Russian history in pictures" published in 1836.
Date	August 18, 1581 – February 4, 1582
Location	Pskov, Russia 57°49′N 28°20′E
Result	See § Result (Peace of Yam-Zapolsky)

Belligerents
Polish–Lithuanian Commonwealth; Principality of Transylvania and foreign mercenaries	Tsardom of Russia

Commanders and leaders
King Stephen Báthory; Jan Zamoyski	Prince Ivan Shuisky; Prince Vasili Skopin-Shuisky

Strength
27,000; 4,000 Cossacks (500 officially registered)	16,000

The siege of Pskov, known as the Pskov Defense in Russia (Russian: оборона Пскова), took place between August 1581 and February 1582, when the army of the Polish king and Grand Duke of Lithuania Stephen Báthory laid an unsuccessful siege and successful blockade of the city of Pskov during the final stage of the Livonian War of 1558–1583.

The first detachments of the Polish–Lithuanian army, which in the previous two years captured Polotsk (1579) and Velikiye Luki (1580), appeared at the walls of Pskov on August 18, 1581. This action completely cut off Russian forces from the territory of Livonia. The main invading force (31,000 men, Polish, Lithuanian, Hungarian, Bohemian, Wallachian, and German soldiers) laid siege to the city on August 24–26. Prince Vasili Skopin-Shuisky was nominally in charge of the defense of Pskov, but Prince Ivan Shuisky was the one to actually implement it. The latter had up to 4,000 dvoryane, streltsy, and Cossacks and some 12,000 armed citizens of Pskov and its surroundings at his disposal.

After a two-day shelling of Pskov, the Polish army attacked for the first time on September 8. The Russians repelled the assault, which resulted in heavy Polish losses. Attempts to blow up the fortifications with mines and a general attack on November 2 also turned out to be fruitless. In November some Polish forces attacked the Pskovo-Pechorsky Monastery, but to no avail.

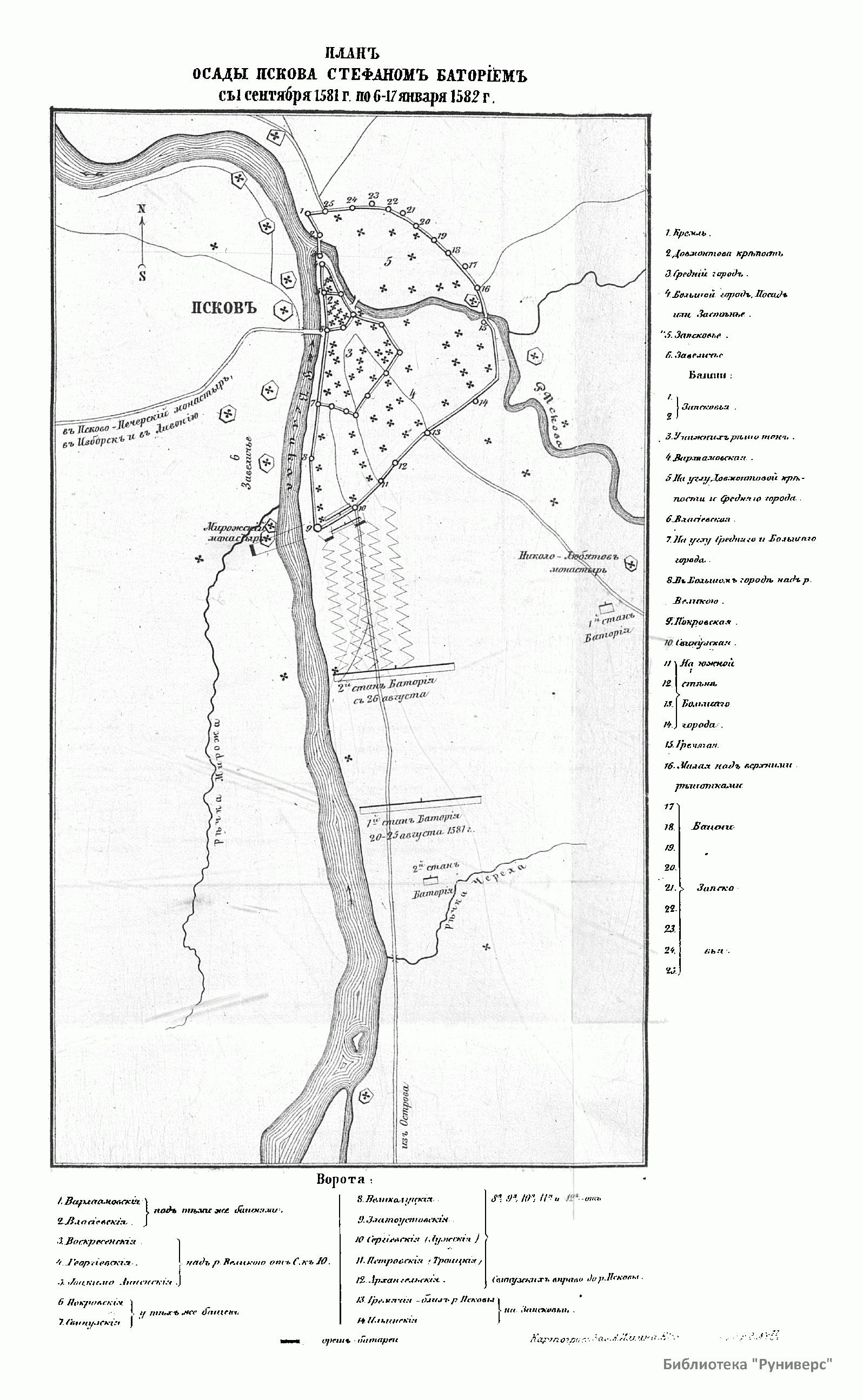
The plan for the siege of Pskov

King Stephen Báthory then ordered a passive siege, and the battle became a blockade. On December 1 the king left the siege together with most of the Lithuanian army, volunteers, and German, Hungarian, Romanian, Bohemian and Scottish mercenaries. Command of the remaining forces was given to Jan Zamojski. At the same time, during the siege in 1581, Polish cavalry raids devastated many regions of Russia, reaching Volga and Lake Ladoga. The regular cavalry was the best unit of the Polish forces. During the harsh winter of 1581-2 the rest of the besieging army would have mutinied but for the iron will of Chancellor Zamojski. The Chancellor held the blockade, although Russian partisans had been active in the Pskov area, attacking enemy foragers and communications.

The Pskovian garrison undertook frequent sallies (approximately 46), mostly in November and December 1581. There were 31 attacks by Polish troops during the five-month siege. The siege dragged on, with neither side able to end it; in the meantime diplomatic negotiations, in which the Vatican became involved, led to the end of hostilities.

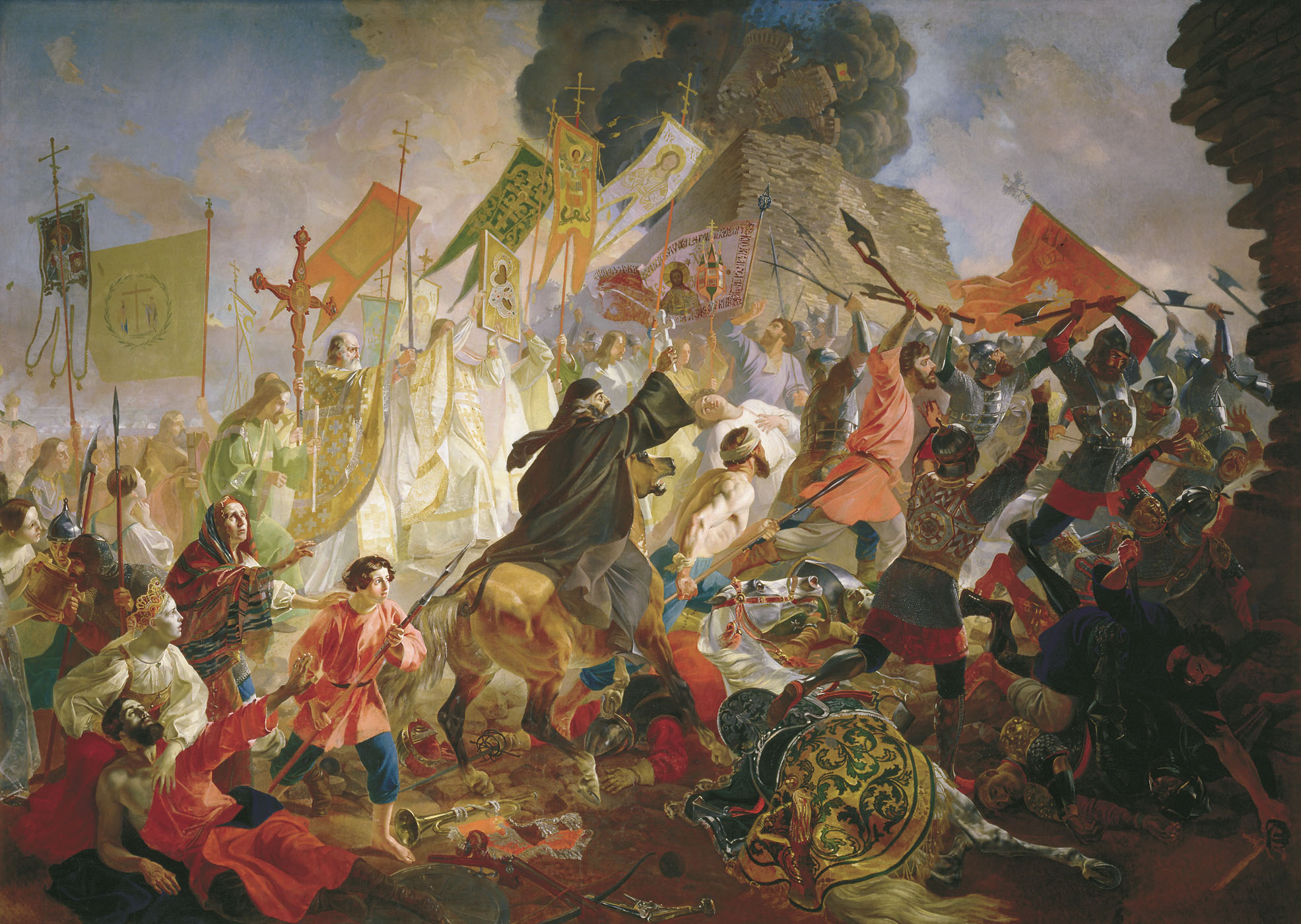
Siege of Pskov, from the Russian perspective. The final (and unfinished) painting of Karl Briullov.

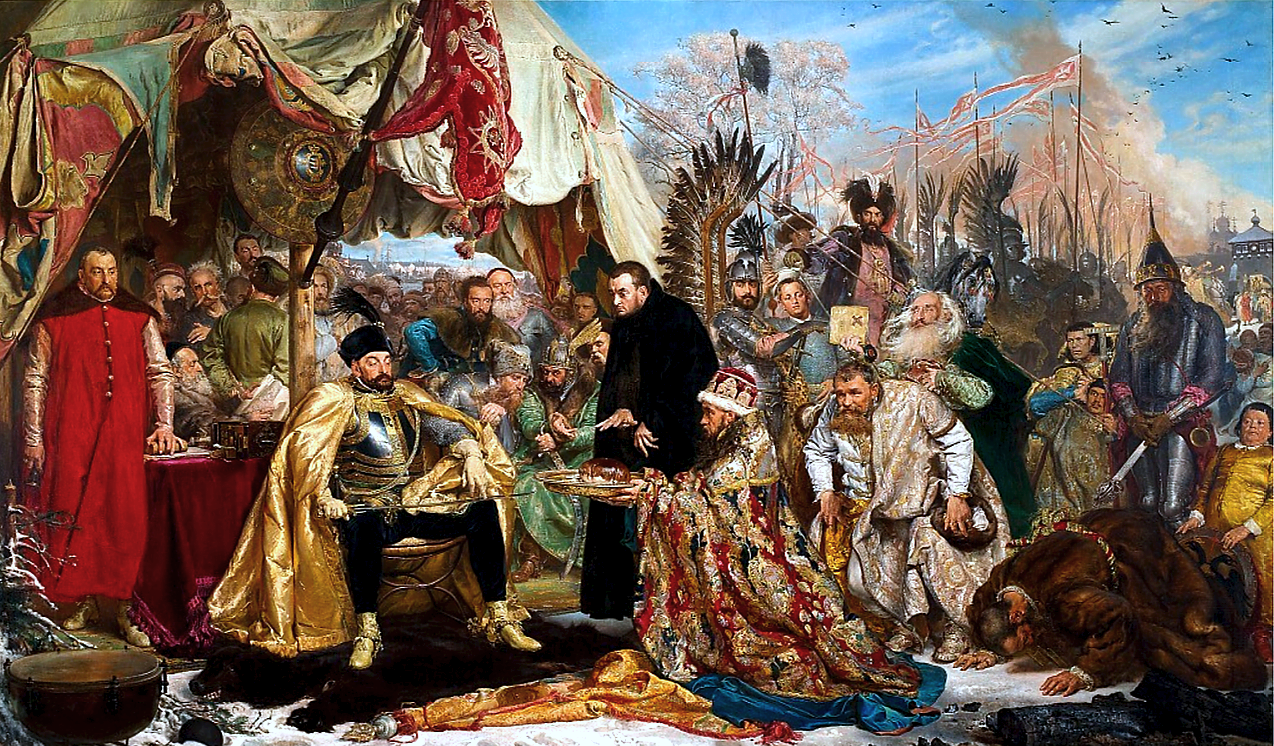
Painting of the siege from Polish perspective, Bathory at Pskov by Jan Matejko.

Báthory and Ivan IV finally signed the Treaty of Jam Zapolski on January 15; Russia renounced its claims to Livonia and Polotsk and in exchange the Commonwealth returned Russian territories its armies had captured. On February 4, 1582, the last detachments of the Polish-Lithuanian army left the outskirts of Pskov.

The siege of Pskov is commemorated on the Tomb of the Unknown Soldier, Warsaw, with the inscription "PSKOW 24 VIII 1581-15 I 1582".

== Result ==
The siege ended in a Russian victory, (According to other sources, only tactical) both sides were exhausted from long battles, Ivan the Terrible realized that he did not have the strength to unblock the city, and the Poles compared it to Paris, believing that they would never take it. But despite this, the Poles achieved a strategic victory. And according to other sources, the Poles won mental and strategic.

== See also ==
- Muscovite–Lithuanian Wars
