= Nicolae Pătrașcu =

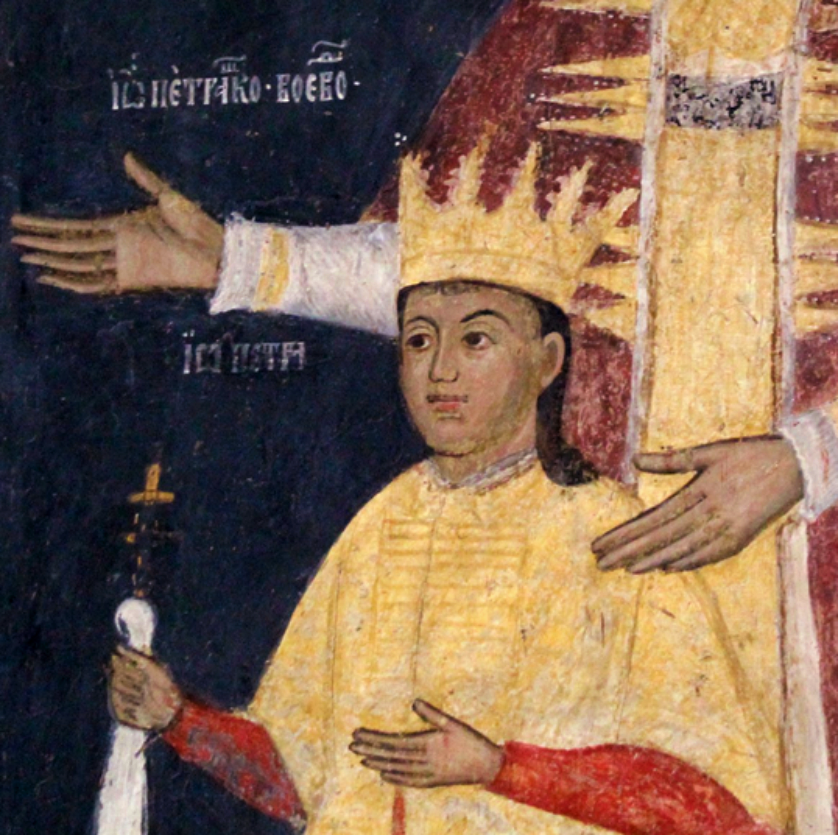
- Nicolae Pătrașcu as ktitor. Fragment from a Căluiu Monastery fresco

Prince of Wallachia
- Reign: December 1599–September 1601 (de facto October 1600)
- Predecessor: Michael the Brave
- Successor: Simion Movilă (1600); Radu Șerban (1601)
- Born: c. 1580
- Died: late 1627 (aged 47 or younger); Archduchy of Austria or Pressburg, Habsburg Hungary
- Burial: Comana Monastery
- Spouse: Ana (Ancuța) Radulea
- Issue: Gavril Pătrașcu; Mihai Pătrașcu; Ilinca Leurdeanca
- Dynasty: Drăculești?
- Father: Michael the Brave
- Mother: Lady Stanca
- Religion: Orthodox

Nicolae Pătrașcu, Petrașco, or Petrașcu, also styled Nicolae Vo(i)evod (Church Slavonic and Romanian Cyrillic: Нєколає or Николає Воєвод; c. 1580 – late 1627), was the titular Prince of Wallachia, an only son of Michael the Brave and Lady Stanca, and a putative grandson of Pătrașcu the Good. His early childhood coincided with Michael's quick rise through the ranks of boyardom, peaking in 1593, when Michael became Prince and Nicolae his heir apparent. As he began a quest to emancipate Wallachia from the Ottoman Empire, Michael used his son as a party to alliances with the Holy Roman Empire and the Principality of Transylvania, proposing him as either a hostage or a matrimonial guarantee. While entering the Long Turkish War on the Christian side, Michael also negotiated a settlement with the Ottomans, again offering Nicolae as a guarantee.

With the strengthening of Michael's alliance with the Habsburg monarchy in 1599, Nicolae participated in Michael's conquest of Transylvania. In December 1599 he was sent back to Wallachia to rule as Prince, while Michael took direct charge of Transylvania and then conquered Moldavia. Some records suggest that Nicolae was considered, or considered himself, a Prince of Moldavia, though that title was more likely held by a cousin, Marcu Cercel. In late 1600, the Polish–Lithuanian Commonwealth and Moldavia invaded Wallachia and chased out Nicolae, replacing him with Simion Movilă. Michael was also chased out of Transylvania by his former ally Giorgio Basta and a large faction of the Hungarian nobility. In negotiating his peace with the latter, he sent Nicolae and Stanca as hostages. They were assigned ownership of Gilău, but, following clashes between Basta and the Hungarians, were taken by the latter to a harsher imprisonment in Făgăraș Citadel. Basta assassinated Michael in August 1601, but then liberated the family, with the ostensibly pro-Habsburg Nicolae still vying for the Wallachian throne.

In 1602, the Wallachian crown went to Radu Șerban of Coiani, who had previously been Nicolae's Paharnic. Mutilated by his rival, Nicolae settled in the Archduchy of Austria, joining the regional court of Ferdinand Habsburg. He later moved to Habsburg Hungary, living mostly in Tyrnau with his own retinue. He litigated over his father's assets, which had been confiscated by the Empire, and set out to redeem his memory, while also involving himself in conspiracies for the recovery of Wallachia. From 1610, he reconciled with Radu Șerban, becoming his Postelnic and assisting with his expedition into Burzenland. He welcomed the older Prince in exile, after he was deposed by the Ottomans in 1611, and two years later married his daughter, Ana. From then until 1620, the two former Princes participated in anti-Ottoman projects that also involved the Duke of Nevers, the Movilești, and Gaspar Graziani.

During the Thirty Years' War, which began after Ferdinand took the imperial throne in 1619, Nicolae and Radu Șerban joined a Habsburg coalition against Gabriel Bethlen's Transylvania. They themselves were chased out of Tyrnau by Bethlen's offensive, and both died of gout within seven years of each other, leaving the family in destitution. In the 1640s, Nicolae's son Mihai was asked by Wallachian Prince Matei Basarab to become his crown prince, but this request did not suit Habsburgs policies, and was dropped. Nicolae's widow and his daughter Ilinca were allowed passage, and repatriated both Princes' remains, which were buried together at Comana Monastery. Ilinca went on to marry a high-ranking boyar, Istratie Leurdeanu.

== Name ==
In a document which uses the courtly language, Church Slavonic, Nicolae describes himself as: Млстію Вжією Іѡ Нєколає Воєвода и гспднь въсою зємлє ꙋггровлахискоє ("By the Grace of God Io Niecolaie Voivode and Hospodar of the Entire Hungro-Wallachian Country"). Historian Nicolae Iorga highlights the exotic nature of Nicolae's baptismal name, in its temporal context. The last Prince of Wallachia to have been crowned under that name was the 14th-century Nicolae Alexandru, whose memory had faded, and it was only used since by the pretender Nicolaus Bassaraba. The latter, a scion of the Craiovești, had made his most successful bid for the throne in 1563–1564. Iorga proposes that both Bassaraba and Pătrașcu were in fact named in honor of their supposed common ancestor, Neagoe Basarab, both of them with a synophone. Scholar Ștefan Mihăilescu believes that Michael the Brave may have named his son in direct homage to Saint Nicholas, whom he credited as his personal protector. A period witness and biographer, Balthasar Walther, contrarily reports that Pătrașcu celebrated his name day on the Feast of Saint Peter (June 29).

In Moldavia, the Prince was generally known as Neculai or Nicola, although one Moldavian document of 1600 refers to him as Petru Vodă ("Peter the Voivode"). The derivative Pătrașcu appears in Nicolae's signatures in Neo-Latin, which style him as Nicolaus Petrasko Waiwoda or Nicolaus Petrascus Waiwoda. The registers of the Hof-Bibliothek, also kept in Latin, name him as Nicolaus Petrascus or Nicolaas Petrash. In Tuscan sources, his name appeared more simply as Petraschi Vaivoda. Some of the Romanian writs issued after his departure refer to him as Pătrașco Voevod, or merely as Jupan Necula. Another early Romanian record, preserved by Nicolae's tombstone, cites him as Petrașco Niculae.

== Biography ==
=== Origins and early life ===
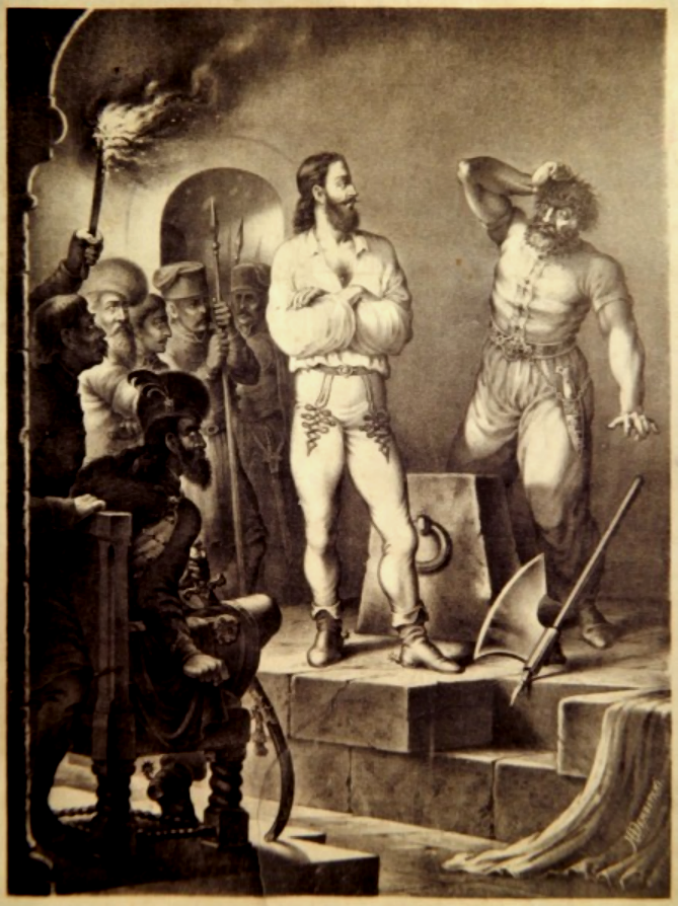
Legend of Michael the Brave miraculously escaping his executioner, as depicted in an 1872 lithograph

Various scholarly disputes surround the origins of Nicolae's father Michael the Brave, or Mihai Viteazul, who passed himself off as a son of Pătrașcu the Good, from the Drăculești princely clan, and therefore also as a half-brother of Petru Cercel. Some historians accept that he was Prince Pătrașcu's son, or at least a member of his house. Others simply list Michael's paternal roots as disputed. Nicolae's grandmother was Teodora (Tudora), Pătrașcu's alleged mistress. A native or resident of Orașul de Floci, she was of Greek ethnicity and reportedly worked as a barmaid.

In the 16th century, Wallachia was a tributary state of the Ottoman Empire, which had an important say in its political life. From beginnings as an itinerant merchant, Michael joined the boyar aristocracy in 1588, when he served as lesser Ban in Mehedinți County, then as Stolnic. According to contemporary writers such as Germanico Malaspina, Nicolae looked to be aged 12 or 13 in 1599–1600, meaning that he was born in 1586 or 1587. Mihăilescu has "year unknown". According to his research, the only reliable date to go by is 1584, the year of Michael's marriage to Lady Stanca; Nicolae was the couple's eldest child. Historian Radu Mârza gives Nicolae's birth year as "approx. 1584", while other documentary evidence pushes the date back to ca. 1575.

Stanca, who had been previously married to Postelnic Dumitru of Vâlcănești, was a relative of the Buzești boyars. She was also mother of Michael's daughter, Florica, who may have been born to another woman. Historians disagree on whether Florica was born ca. 1585 or much earlier. She was promised in marriage to several European monarchs, but eventually wed boyar Preda "Floricoiu" of Cepturoaia. Stanca's brother was Dragomir of Cârțoclești, who was briefly Michael's Stolnic; this made her aunt of another boyar, Spatharios Balea, who acted as her caretaker. Historians have often assumed that Stanca was the sister of Vornic Dragomir Dobromirescu, but later research proved that there was no relation between them. Genealogist Constantin Gane also describes Stanca as the daughter of Logothete Radu of Drăgoești and a niece of Dobromirescu, though other historians reject that hypothesis.

Michael, rising to become Great Ban of Oltenia, fell afoul of the ruling Prince, Alexander the Wicked. According to legend, he miraculously evaded execution, then left into self-exile. It is probable that Nicolae and Stanca remained behind in Oltenia. Walther reports that Pătrașcu went into hiding with a band of Gypsies, while Stanca was sent to live with the "women of the land". Michael eventually took the throne in 1593, with crucial backing from the Ottoman potentate Andronikos Kantakouzenos. The latter is often assumed to have been a brother of Teodora, which would establish a genealogical link between Nicolae and the emerging Cantacuzino family. The interpretation remains controversial.

Nicolae followed his family to Bucharest, and probably lived with them in the princely court of Piața cu Flori. An oral tradition records that he owned two pet deer, which he raised on the castle grounds. Michael grew somewhat estranged from his wife, and kept several official mistresses. One of these was Tudora, wife of the scribe Fiera Leurdeanu, who gave birth to a daughter. Named Marula, she later became wife of Clucer Socol Cornățeanu. One tradition refers to another Wallachian, the alleged son of Michael and brother of Nicolae, who ended up serving the Ottoman Empire as Hazar Pasha.

Nicolae's stay in Bucharest ended in 1594, when Michael rebelled against the Ottoman Empire. Wallachia joined the Holy League and the Holy Roman Empire, opening a new theater in the Long Turkish War. The Ottoman Army responded to the revolt by ransacking Bucharest, during which time one of Nicolae's deer was killed and the other lost. The princely family fled to the fortress town of Gherghița, although rumor soon spread that they had been sent as hostages to the Principality of Transylvania. According to Mârza, the new developments had pushed Michael into using his own family as pawns in a "complexity of diplomatic games".

=== Becoming Prince ===
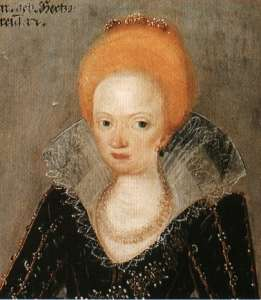
Marie of Prussia, who, in 1598, was considered as a suitable wife for Nicolae

Michael eventually defeated the Ottoman intruders at Călugăreni in August 1595. Sources differ as to what Nicolae and Stanca were doing during that interval. Some authors believe that they remained in Gherghița until autumn 1596, when they finally moved to the second capital, Târgoviște. Walther visited the place in June 1597, in time for Pătrașcu's name day, and composed an epigram for the occasion. From such accounts, scholar Nicolae Bălcescu deduces that he was Pătrașcu's tutor—a claim seen as inaccurate by historian Dan Simonescu, who finds it more likely that Walther was a diplomatic envoy. In 1599, Walther wrote that the Prince sent "his woman, his children and all that he held dear" to safety in Hermannstadt. Other reports of the period suggests that Michael began negotiating a truce with the Ottomans, during which he offered to send Nicolae as a hostage to Istanbul. According to this narrative, Nicolae was still in Transylvania. Upon receiving news of Wallachia's rapprochement with the Ottomans, Transylvanian Princess Maria Christina ordered Michael's entire family to be quietly arrested. They remained hostages until January or February 1596.

Walther also suggests that Maria Christina's returning husband, Sigismund Báthory, adhered to Michael's conciliatory lines. In July 1597, both were more openly negotiating with Sultan Mehmed III. The latter promised recognition for Michael, and for Nicolae as his rightful successor. Around that time, Michael also negotiated the terms of a new alliance with Transylvania, promising that he would marry Nicolae to a sister of Transylvanian magnate István Jósika; Florica, meanwhile, was to marry Jósika's son. The project was suppressed when Sigismund Báthory refused to commit to the Holy League, prompting Michael to seek a matrimonial alliance with the Habsburgs and Hohenzollerns. Michael was especially worried when Mehmed asked for Nicolae to be sent as hostage, pushing him back into rebellion. In 1598, he proposed that Florica marry Emperor Rudolf, and also tried to arrange Nicolae's wedding to Marie of Prussia. That year, Nicolae was given his first official assignment, which involved greeting Imperial envoys as they arrived in Târgoviște. In late 1597, Michael had also sent for Marcu Cercel, his alleged nephew, who had spent his childhood in Transylvania. According to the chronicler Ciro Spontone, Marcu was virtually adopted by the Prince, and was also being considered a suitor for Marula or Florica.

Some scholars argue that, at some point in 1598 or 1599, Nicolae was dispatched to Transylvania, enrolling at the Jesuit Academy in Clausenburg. Mihăilescu believes that the school gave him his proficiency in Neo-Latin. However, Mârza cautions, no document shows whether Nicolae actually attended courses, but only that Michael had wanted him to enroll. In any case, this period ended with a sudden worsening of relations between the Holy League and Transylvania, with Andrew Báthory taking over as the latter country's Prince. The deterioration prompted Michael to begin his conquest of Transylvania. Nicolae was by his father's side during the victory at Șelimbăr (October 1599), and was then present for the fealty ceremonies at Alba Iulia.

For several months, Michael oscillated between the Habsburgs, who demanded his total submission, and the Ottomans, from whom he could expect recognition as Transylvanian Prince. In his dealings with either side, he offered to send Nicolae as a hostage. Meanwhile, Michael's reign in Wallachia was under threat, with a new offensive started by the Ottoman Army, which again tried to penetrate into Wallachia. The expedition notably included a pretender known as Cremonese Basarab, who was probably Nicolaus Bassaraba's son. In early December, Michael ordered Nicolae back to Târgoviște by way of Bran, assigning him a 6,000-strong guard under the command of Pongrác Szennyey. According to Gane, Stanca was made a regent, which allowed Michael to spend more time with his Transylvanian mistress, Velica Genga.

Nicolae Pătrașcu was the reigning Prince of Wallachia between December 1599 and September 1601. For this reason, Michael's unification of Wallachia and Transylvania is described by various historians as mostly a dynastic union. According to Constantin Rezachevici, Nicolae was a full lord of his country, but his father was the "higher point of reference". As noted by Iorga, Nicolae's "full and uncontested" rule over Wallachia was meant to free Michael's had in claiming the throne of Transylvania (where he was formally governor on behalf of the Habsburgs). He was also using the separation of offices as an instrument against Rudolf's demands. In early 1600, when Rudolf demanded Nicolae as a hostage, Michael replied that this would mean statelessness for Wallachia. Nicolae's reign over Wallachia was assisted by a Boyar Council. Andronikos Kantakouzenos, Nicolae's putative uncle, was reportedly his tutor; he also managed the country's fiscal affairs, as Vistier, while Miroslav of Râfov was Logothete. Șerban of Coiani, who would later play a significant role in Wallachian history, was Nicolae's Paharnic. At least one document confirms that Radu Buzescu was the acting Postelnic.

=== In Moldavia ===
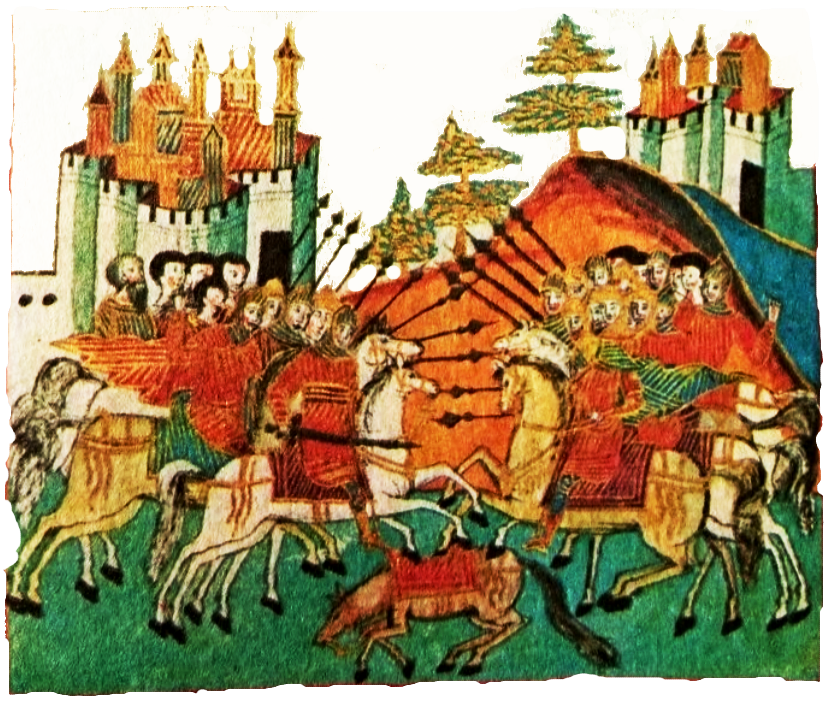
Moldavian battle scene of ca. 1600, depicted as a struggle between Saul and David. Illustration to a manuscript ordered by Anastasie Crimca and kept at Dragomirna Monastery

From his campsite in Transylvania, Michael set his sights on Moldavia, which was governed by a hostile Movilești regime, closely allied with the Polish–Lithuanian Commonwealth. Initially, Michael pursued matrimonial diplomacy: Nicolae was to marry a daughter of the Moldavian Prince Ieremia Movilă. The latter refused the offer, as he was instead pushing for his brother, Simion Movilă, to take the Wallachian throne. Michael began preparing for war, but could only hope to succeed if he created a rift between Poland and the Movilești. Around December 1599, he was considering a matrimonial alliance with the Szlachta, through both Nicolae and Florica. Early the following year, he offered to send Nicolae as a hostage to Kraków. King Sigismund Vasa refused to accept, and informed Michael that he could still expect retaliation.

Michael led his combined Wallachian–Transylvanian force into a storming of Moldavia. His son reportedly joined in the effort, traveling with the Wallachian army along the Trotuș River on May 5, 1600. Some twenty days later, Ieremia fled Moldavia, leaving the Wallachians in control; Nicolae had regained Târgoviște by that time. Various historians agree that Nicolae was selected by Michael to be the new Moldavian ruler. Rezachevici nuances this verdict, arguing that Michael in fact groomed Nicolae and his heirs to rule as a single dynasty over all three countries. A contemporary testimony by the Polish diplomat Andrzej Tarnowski argues the same, namely that Michael expected Sigismund Vasa to recognize "Wallachia, Moldavia and Transylvania [as belonging] to his son Nicolae, and to his heirs of the male gender." In June, as he rearranged the Moldavian Orthodox Church, placed under Archbishop Dionysus Rallis, Michael received the oath of office from other hierarchs. The group, including Anastasie Crimca, who took over as Bishop of Rădăuți, swore his allegiance not just to Michael, but also to Nicolae. This also appears in one oath by the newly appointed pârcălab of Suceava.

An interpretation of Nicolae's role in Moldavia is found in 18th-century variant of Letopisețul Cantacuzinesc, which claims that Michael ordered Radu Buzescu to arrange Nicolae's departure for Iași. The same source reports that Michael changed his mind as the expedition was starting, and instead placed Moldavia under a regency. According to historian N. Grigoraș, the Moldavian move may have been vetoed by Stanca, although some of the Moldavian boyars had proved welcoming. One contemporary account claims that Michael no longer wanted "his little son" as ruler of a "a borderland, for he was still fearful of Ieremia Voivode". As noted by Rezachevici, this may in fact refer to his awareness that the Polish army of Stanisław Żółkiewski was preparing the reconquest of Moldavia. Under this Wallachian ascendancy, Moldavia's throne was most probably being prepared for Marcu Cercel. The regency council which then emerged is generally believed to have comprised Andronikos, Hetman Udrea Băleanu, Spatharios Negrea, and Armaș Sava.

By June 1600 Nicolae was also styling himself "ruler over the whole Country of Transylvania". In July, Michael requested from Rudolf that he and Nicolae be recognized as joint rulers of all three countries, and that their dynasty, including female descendants, be left to rule "to the end of time". On September 12, Rudolf finally issued a writ recognizing Michael and Nicolae as lifetime governors of Transylvania and as Princes of the other two countries. Over those months, however, Michael had lost Transylvania to an insurgency headed by the Imperial warlord Giorgio Basta, and assisted by the Hungarian nobility; Moldavia was also reconquered by the Poles and the Movilești (see Battle of Mirăslău, Moldavian Magnate Wars). He was forced back into Wallachia when the Poles began their march on Bucharest. Shortly before the battle of Bucov, he pledged to send Stanca and his children, including Nicolae, as hostages to Transylvania, hoping to secure a truce with Basta. Michael obtained guarantees that his family would not be imprisoned by his enemies, the Transylvanian Saxons, but Basta denied his other requests, including that they would be dispatched to Făgăraș Citadel.

=== As hostage ===
Despite the pledge, Michael was also very unwilling to send his family abroad, and procrastinated to October 1600. Florica only arrived on December 30, and Teodora, also promised as a hostage, never left Wallachia. Nicolae finally presented himself at Lécfalva on October 16, accompanied by Archbishop Dionysus and Vistier Stoica Rioșeanu. All three pledged their loyalty to Rudolf and expressed criticism of Michael's policies. On October 17, Nicolae and his mother were honored guests at Corona, on their way to a gilded imprisonment in the castle of Gilău (Gela). In their dialogue with Michael, the Hungarians offered Gilău as a permanent family demesne.

After Bucov, Simion Movilă took over Nicolae's throne, in what was in practice an alternative dynastic union between Wallachia and Moldavia. Michael remained an exile, seeking to renew his fealty toward the Habsburgs. He departed for Vienna, where he was to seek additional support from Rudolf and made peace with Basta. This interval presented an opportunity for the Hungarian nobles, who denounced Basta and took control over much of Transylvania. Nicolae and Stanca, now their prisoners, were removed from Gilău and dispatched to the more secluded Făgăraș. Some of Michael's supporters in Transylvania acknowledged in March 1601 that the family was healthy and satisfied, but a Mantuan report of April claimed otherwise. Stanca later complained to her mother-in-law that the entire family had been mistreated, and other records suggest that their mobile possession were arbitrarily confiscated. Michael tried to have them released into Rudolf's custody, and proposed that Nicolae become his ambassador in Prague.

Despite his revival of the Holy League, Michael was having secret dealings with the Ottomans, to whom he sent a number of peace offerings in exchange for recognition as Prince. Again during the early months of 1601, he offered to send his son, "who is now kept under lock at Făgăraș", to Istanbul. The Ottomans demanded Nicolae from the Hungarian nobles, their nominal allies. The request was denied, because Nicolae's captors expected to hold him as a leverage against Michael, and also because of Stanca's passionate opposition to the plan. In August 1601, with Imperial backing, Michael was able to defeat the rebels at Guruslău. News of this pushed the Wallachian boyars into a successful anti-Movilești rebellion, which technically restored Nicolae on the throne. They sent envoys to Michael's camp, who also reached Făgăraș on their way.

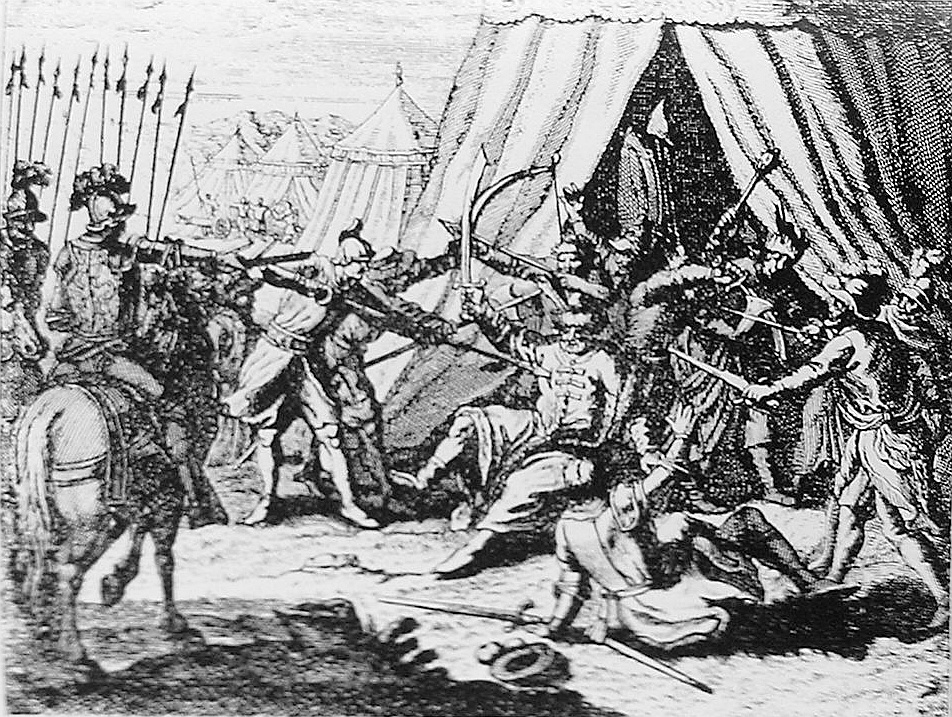
Michael's killing at Câmpia Turzii, in a 1694 illustration of the events

Nicolae's fortunes were overturned within a month, following Michael's killing on Basta's orders, at Câmpia Turzii. Rumors of the period claimed that the two clashed over Michael's intent to divert his forces toward Făgăraș, in order to free Stanca and his children. Others even suggested that Basta framed Michael, first by agreeing to the offensive on Făgăraș, and then by withdrawing support and claiming that Michael was off to join the Ottomans. With Michael dead, Basta took control of the offensive into Transylvania, which eventually included the capture of Făgăraș. An avviso of October 6 claims that Basta's troops ran into Michael's family not at Făgăraș, but at Huszth, which indicates that they had been moved to Partium by the retreating Hungarians, probably through Moldavia. As reported by Gane, Stanca and Nicolae remained harshly critical of Michael in their interviews with Basta and David Ungnad, accepting that he may have been guilty of conspiracy against the Holy League. Nicolae "cried and trembled, informing the German [Ungnad] that, whatever his father's fault, [...] he himself remained blameless and prostrated in front of the Emperor". According to Iorga, the young heir, a "gentle creature", was "blessing his patron Basta, though the latter's hands were drenched in a blood that should have been dear to the princelet."

Marcu Cercel also pledged his loyalties to the Empire. He followed Basta to Făgăraș, hoping to emerge as the Habsburg favorite for the Wallachian throne. A delegation of boyars supported him, while others noted that, at age eighteen, he was hardly competent; they preferred Șerban of Coiani for that position. An avviso from May 1602 claims that Nicolae's candidacy was probably considered by a boyar faction, namely that supporting Wallachia's incorporation within the Empire. By then, Nicolae had been moved to Făgăraș, and was faced with Moldavian demands for his extradition. These were ignored by Basta, who instead asked the Hungarian nobles that they return Nicolae's stolen assets.

=== In exile ===
A Cozia Monastery record details the meeting between Stanca and Teodora, who was by then a nun. According to Gane, this would suggest that Nicolae traveled back to Wallachia to meet his paternal grandmother, while others indicate that he was forced to stay behind in Transylvania until the second half of 1602. In August, Nicolae addressed the Emperor a letter which reaffirmed his loyalty and asked to be received at the court in Prague, while also issuing a claim to Michael's confiscated assets. On September 28, Nicolae was at Șcheii Brașovului, where he donated various assets to St. Nicholas Church, in exchange for regular memorial services honoring his late father. The Wallachian assets he bequeathed included the entire village of Micșunești. In December, Nicolae, Stanca and Florica had reached Vienna, and were asking for Rudolf's assistance.

Between 1602 and 1611, the Wallachian throne was held by Șerban of Coiani, who took the regnal name of Radu Șerban. By 1608, Nicolae had returned to Transylvania, hoping to seal an alliance with its Prince, Gabriel Báthory, against their common Wallachian rival. According to Gane, Nicolae sketched an attempt to topple his rival, leading a "small army he had improvised". Radu Șerban captured him and cut off part of his nose, which technically invalidated Nicolae's candidacy. Despite usurping Nicolae, he was a close follower of Michael's political line. Stanca returned to Wallachia with Florica, but died there in late 1603, a victim of the recurring plague. Balea of Cârțoclești assisted the family with various matters, including Stanca's funeral. Meanwhile, Nicolae obtained an imperial monthly pension worth 100 Goldgulden. He was also assigned to the retinue of Ferdinand Habsburg, the Archduke of Austria, which required his presence in Graz ca. 1603, and, on May 30, 1606, was made Cup-bearer (Mundschenk) of the Holy Roman Empire. Nevertheless, his funding was irregular, and overall viewed as insufficient by Nicolae and his retinue, who were increasingly dependent on pawnbrokers.

The former Prince eventually settled in Tyrnau, to the west of Habsburg Hungary (in present-day Slovakia). From Tyrnau, he litigated over his father's remaining assets, which were still in the Empire's custody, and also demanded Kynsburg Castle, in Lower Silesia, which had been promised to Michael. In 1605, the Geheimrat recognized that Nicolae was owed 15,000 thaler from his father's possessions, but failed to enforce this ruling, leaving Nicolae to issue a formal protest to the Hungarian Diet of Pressburg. In 1606, the Aulic Council settled his outstanding debt of 20,000 thaler, but he continued to be pressed by his creditors; six years later, he resold to Emperor Rudolf his father's golden necklace. He had earlier declared this artifact lost. Meanwhile, the burghers of Tyrnau issued complaints against their guest, accusing his retinue of excessive luxury and resource depletion.

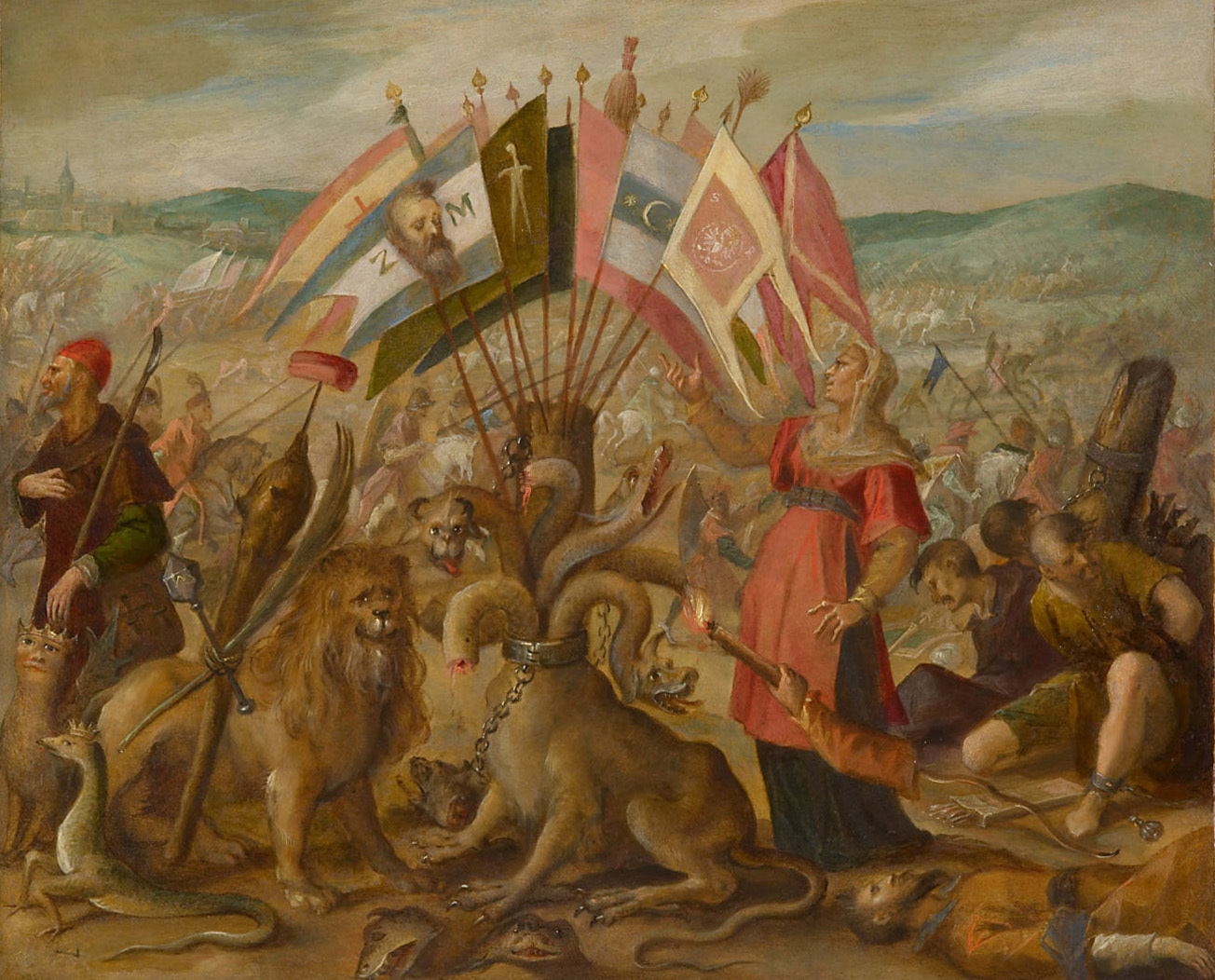
Hans von Aachen's allegory of the battle of Brașov (1608), in which Radu Șerban and the Habsburg defeated the Principality of Transylvania and its Ottoman allies

In 1610, Radu Șerban recognized Nicolae as a Postelnic. In this interval, Nicolae exchanged deeds over his father's village of Ciulnița with Logothete Oancea, receiving instead Glina, though he never took possession of the latter. In July 1611, he fought alongside the Wallachian Prince as he defeated Báthory in Burzenland. Later that year, Radu Șerban was chased out of Bucharest by another Ottoman invasion, and replaced with Radu Mihnea. An 18th-century compilation by Franjo Ksaver Pejačević suggests that both Princes escaped Wallachia together, heading for Vienna. Eventually, Radu Șerban also settled at Tyrnau. From there, he began plotting Radu Mihnea's downfall, profiting from the Ottomans' focus on a parallel war in Persia. The expedition, finally started in 1616, was blocked by the hostile Transylvanian regime of Gabriel Bethlen, who joined with Iskender Pasha and defeated the Wallachian returnees in Moldavia.

Șerban's effort was also assisted by Moldavia's Princess Elisabeta, on behalf of the Movilești. This final reconciliation ended badly for the Moldavians, as Elisabeta and her son Alexandru were dethroned and imprisoned by the Ottomans. Nicolae remained close to Gabriel Movilă, who became Prince of Wallachia in June 1618. During that episode, Nicolae and Marcu Cercel again found themselves on opposite sides: frustrated in his attempts to obtain a Wallachian or Moldavian crown, Marcu had turned against his Habsburg backers. In his final years, he was one of Bethlen's trusted supporters.

=== Final years ===
Nicolae ultimately married Radu Șerban's daughter, known as Ana or Ancuța Radulea, on July 10, 1618. The wedding was blessed by a new Emperor, Matthias, who presented the couple with a silver chalice. The scandal over Michael's inheritance peaked the same year, when Matthias ordered an Hofkriegsrat investigation into Michael's killing. The news were poorly received by Nicolae, who complained that the inquiry would open the record to "calumnies" against his father and cement Basta's depiction of the Prince as a "traitor".

The issue was put on hold by the accession of Archduke Ferdinand to the imperial throne, an event which also sparked the Thirty Years' War. In 1619, Bethlen, joining the anti-Habsburg coalition, attacked Ferdinand's possessions in Hungary. Nicolae, Ana, and Radu Șerban fled Tyrnau ahead of a siege, moving to Modern, then to Eisenstadt. During that interval, both former Princes became involved in the project to assist the Maniot revolt in Ottoman Greece, with the Duke of Nevers asking them to support his "Christian Militia", which also fought against Bethlen. Although criticized as Orthodox "Schismatics", they were eventually accepted as allies, alongside the ephemeral Catholic Prince of Moldavia, Gaspar Graziani. In November 1619, Nicolae and Graziani assisted George Druget's attack on Bethlen's Transylvania, also transferring exorbitant sums to Sigismund Vasa in exchange for his Lisowczycy (see Battle of Humenné). Nicolae became Druget's favorite for the Wallachian crown, his father-in-law having since retired from the race. Eventually, Nicolae and Radu Șerban became aware that Graziani wanted the crown of Wallachia for himself, and were resentful, taking their distance from the Militia.

In February 1620, after having moved to Vienna, Nicolae lost his father-in-law to gout, and inherited from him the assets of the Coiani boyars. By then, Nicolae was again emerging as Ferdinand's favorite: the Empire would not assign him more money, but Michael's inheritance was paid up in land, houses, and salt. Following the Habsburg–Transylvanian rapprochement, he began writing of his plan to regain Bucharest with Bethlen's help. Nevertheless, he himself was immobilized by gout, turning his attention to less material pursuits, in particular reading. By 1626, attempting to alleviate his symptoms, he sought specialized care in Vienna. In his correspondence with Sebastian Tengnagel, he asked to receive books of grammar and theology from the Hof-Bibliothek, noting that he had "no other pleasure left". He complained to Ferdinand's court of his insolvency, receiving backing from the Count Esterházy.

Nicolae died of gout in 1627, either somewhere "in Austria" or at Pressburg. As noted by Ștefan Mihăilescu, his date of death was between June 19 and September 7. According to the same author, he was probably aged 40 or 41. The body was assigned for burial to the Orthodox church of Raab. Ana survived on a 50-Goldgulden pension, also finding employment as a seamstress; Ferdinand refused to let her return home. By 1635, she was able to pay off her debt to the citizens of Tyrnau, but protested that they would not return her collateral. She also took up her husband's inheritance claim, and, as early as 1627, complained to Ferdinand that Count Esterházy, as Palatine of Hungary, was blocking her litigation. The Emperor intervened and ordered the procedures to be carried out with some expediency. Parts of Michael the Brave's estate were also being requested by some of the prominent Hungarian families, including Bánffy, Héderváry, and Esterházy.

== Legacy ==
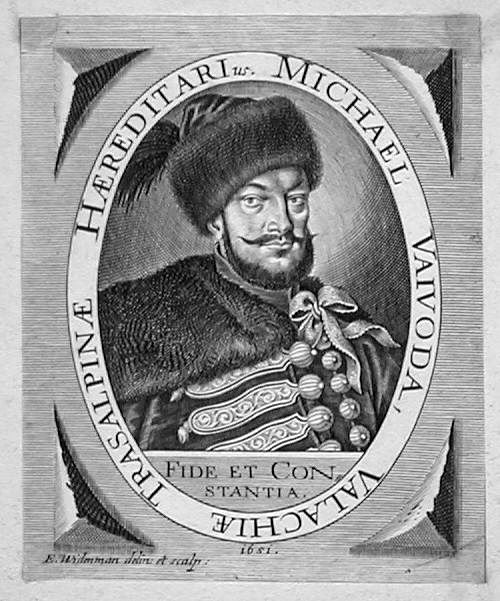
Elias Wiedemann's engraving of Michael Vaivoda, which may depict Mihai Pătrașcu

Nicolae's remains were finally exhumed by Ana in 1640, and taken to Wallachia together with Radu Șerban's (recovered from St. Stephen's Cathedral). The reigning Prince Matei Basarab welcomed them in Bucharest, then buried them together in the shared necropolis of Comana Monastery. The epitaph, which probably dates from the late 18th century, commemorates both as heroes of the defense against Islam and "the Hungarian heretic". Unusually, Nicolae and his family were regularly commemorated by a Moldavian church at Golia Monastery. Their likeness remains preserved at Căluiu Monastery, in Oboga, which Michael furbished in 1593–1594. His heir is shown alongside his mother on the Căluiu naos, painted by a Master Mina. Mihăilescu, who also writes that Prince Nicolae was a Wallachian version of Napoleon II, laments that his fate was otherwise "nearly entirely forgotten."

The marriage of Nicolae and Ana produced two sons, Gavril and Mihai Pătrașcu, and a daughter, Ilinca (Elena). Gavril died in 1622, an infant or young child. Nicolae's daughter stayed with her mother in Austria until 1640. Both returned to settle in Filipeștii de Târg, alongside the Cantacuzinos, before recovering their family estates. They could resume ownership of Bârca and Mircești-Simileasca, but not of their serfs, who were recognized as manumitted by Prince Matei. Florica had died shortly after her brother, in or around 1629, while Marula was still alive in 1647.

Mihai, who was also recognized as a Cup-bearer, stated a claim to his share of the Coiani inheritance, demanding in particular 4,000 Goldgulden pledged by the Empire to his maternal grandmother, Elena Șerban. He was still attached to Vienna, with Ferdinand III forcefully keeping him on his entourage and considering him for the throne of Transylvania. In 1643, he was trying to instigate a pro-Habsburg rebellion among the Romanians of Transylvania. This prevented Prince Matei, whose sons Matei II and Mateiaș had both died, from adopting Michael the Great's grandson. In 1654, formally released from Austrian service, Mihai made a final effort to regain Wallachia, counting on assistance from the Cossack rebels. He fell ill with the plague upon reaching Bohdan Khmelnytsky's court in Chyhyryn, and was recorded as dead by 1656. One tradition suggests that he was the suitor for Domnița Ruxandra, daughter of Moldavian Prince Vasile Lupu and widow of Tymofiy Khmelnytsky. Some scholars also argue that he is the Michael Vaivoda depicted in a 1651 engraving by Elias Wiedemann.

By then, Ilinca had married Postelnic Istratie Leurdeanu. He was Fiera Leurdeanu's grandson, and son of the Logothete Stroe Leurdeanu. After his failure with Mihai Pătrașcu, Prince Matei hoped to adopt Istratie, but met opposition from the other boyars, and was ultimately discarded in favor of Diicul Buicescul. Both Istratie and Stroe rose to prominence later in the 1650s, under the rule of Radu Șerban's natural son, Constantin Șerban, and then became noted as enemies of the Cantacuzinos. Ilinca was still mentioned in 1656, and died childless some time after; Istratie was executed in December 1658 by a new Prince, Mihnea III. His father survived him by twenty years. Tried for his role in the unlawful execution of Constantin I Cantacuzino (Nicolae's alleged cousin), he was pardoned and sent to a monastery, ending his life as Silvestru the Monk.

Nicolae Pătrașcu enjoys recognition in modern-day Romania. Research into his biography was inaugurated by Alexandru Roman, on behalf of the Romanian Academy. In the 1880s, Roman obtained essential biographical documents relating to Pătrașcu and Ana Radulea, from the estate of György Majláth. The Prince's tunic and cape were recovered from Comana and, by 1978, were on display at the National Military Museum. Posthumous depictions include Constantin Vaeni's 1977 film, Buzduganul cu trei peceți, with Constantin Fugașin as a rambunctious Nicolae Pătrașcu (Victor Rebengiuc is Michael the Brave).

== Arms ==
Like all Wallachian Princes of the period, Nicolae used as his primary symbol the Wallachian bird, which was by then a cross between golden eagle and raven. As noted by heraldist Dan Cernovodeanu, this "hybrid" was represented with "very elegant" form under Nicolae's alleged grandfather, Pătrașcu the Good. A 1616 roll of arms, created by Valentin Franck, puts Nicolae's arms alongside those of his father-in-law, showing them to be nearly identical: they both have oval shields supported by lions affrontés, and "hybrid" birds displayed. In Franck's version, Nicolae's arms feature the bird over a cross potent, and holding a ring in its beak, while Radu Șerban's has a closed beak and no cross. Cernovodeanu proposes that this heraldic distinction highlighted the difference of weight in dynastic claims: Nicolae saw himself as descending from the original House of Basarab, whereas his ally was only related to the Craiovești. However, all seals used by Nicolae, Radu Șerban and Mihai Pătrașcu feature the same display, including lions in supporters and the cross (either behind the bird or in its beak), but without a ring.

Michael the Brave and Nicolae are both associated with another seal, first used on July 27, 1600. Its complex field has the Wallachian bird alongside the Moldavian aurochs, two lions affrontés, and a variant of the nova plantatio theme, with both Princes in supporters. An enduring controversy surrounds the two lions, opposing historians who view them as a variant coat of arms of Transylvania to those who read them as Michael's personal arms; secondary debates range over whether they are shown holding up a sword or rather the trunk of a tree. Among the specialists involved, archivist Aurelian Sacerdoțeanu proposed that the seal was designed by Nicolae in a bid to cement his claim as Michael's successor on the Moldavian throne.

Coat of arms of Nicolae Pătrașcu in the Franck version, 1616

Coat of arms of Radu Șerban in the same Franck version

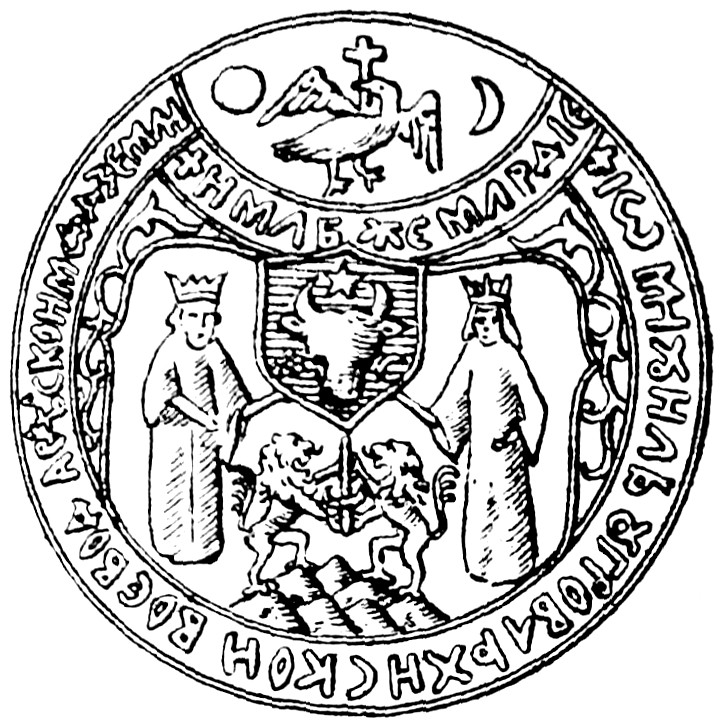
One variant of the 1600 seal, featuring lions with sword; Nicolae and his father as supporters

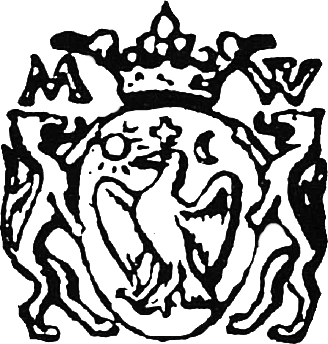
Seal of Mihai Pătrașcu, 1651
