= Doamna Stanca =

Princess Consort of Wallachia, Transylvania and Moldavia

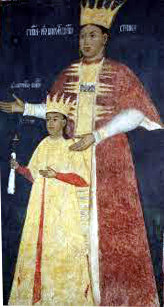
Stanca and her son Nicolae Pătrașcu

Doamna Stanca (died 1603) was a princess consort of Wallachia, Transylvania and Moldavia as the wife of Michael the Brave.

Tradition says that they were married in the Proieni church, Vâlcea County, in 1584.

In 1600, the sometime master of Făgăraș Citadel, Michael the Brave, gave the castle and the Făgăraș domain to Doamna Stanca. He retreated there after the defeat at Mirăslău (18/28 September 1600) and sheltered his family there until 1601.

Doamna Stanca settled there with their two children, Nicolae Pătrașcu and Lady Florica. Michael built a church for his family in the southern part of the city. After the Battle of Mirăslău, the three were held hostage in the city, and after the killing of the Voivode near Turda, on 9/10 August 1601, Doamna Stanca lived there as a captive.

She died in Râmnicu Vâlcea near the end of 1603.
