= Mihai Viteazul National College (Slobozia) =

Romanian high school

Coordinates: 44.5642°N 27.3542°E

Mihai Viteazul National College (Romanian: Colegiul Național Mihai Viteazul) is a high school located at 10 Unirii Boulevard, Slobozia, Romania.

The school was founded in 1952, in the early years of the communist regime, and was co-educational from the beginning. Initially covering grades 1 through 8, it had the full eleven grades of the period within two years. It has occupied the same building since 1968; its previous building is now an elementary school. In 1993, after the Romanian Revolution, it was named after Michael the Brave. It was declared a national college in 2000.
