= Anastasius Crimca =

Moldavian Eastern Orthodox clergyman, calligrapher, illuminator and writer

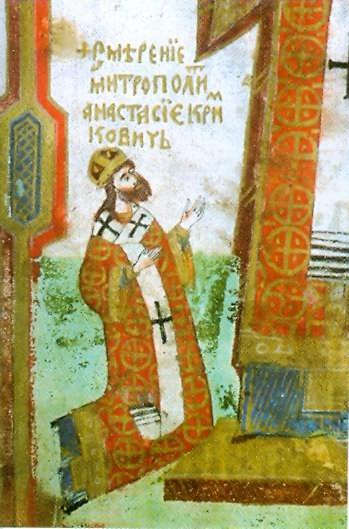
Anastasie Crimca - Selfportrait in Liturghierul Book from 1610

Anastasius (Romanian: Anastasie, secular name Ilie Crimca, Romanian pronunciation: [anasˈtasi.e ˈkrimka]; c. 1550–1629) was a Moldavian Eastern Orthodox clergyman, as well as a calligrapher, illuminator, and writer.

Born in Suceava, he was the Metropolitan of Moldavia (1608–1617; 1619–1629) and the founder of Dragomirna Monastery (1609), where he initiated a scriptorium remarkable for the stylistic unity of the work produced over two decades.

The great similarity of the works has caused them to be attributed to Crimca, although some scholars have disputed this. The accepted opinion is that nine codices can be attributed to him: five of these are at Dragomirna Monastery, three are in Bucharest, and the Acts of the Apostles (1610) is in Vienna. One tetra gospel is in National Library in Warsaw.

He died in Suceava and he is buried in exonarthex of Dragomirna church.
