= Făgăraș Citadel =

- Cetatea Făgărașului
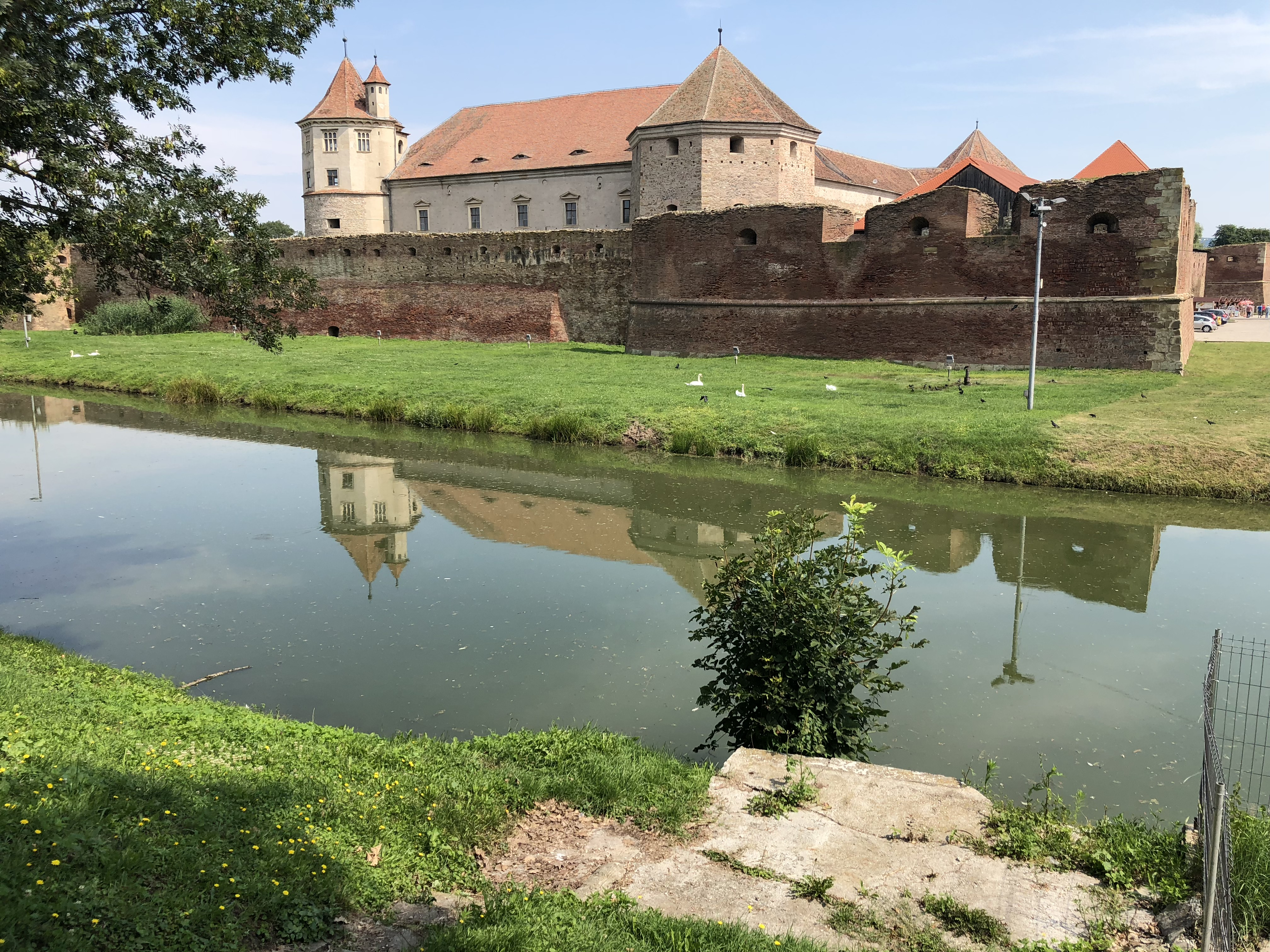
- Făgăraș Citadel Side View

- Location within Romania
- Former names: Cetatea Mihai Viteazul

General information
- Type: Citadel
- Location: Făgăraș; Brașov County, Romania
- Coordinates: 45°50′42.882″N 24°58′25.896″E
- Construction started: 1310

Website
- cetateafagarasului.com

Făgăraș Citadel (Romanian: Cetatea Făgărașului pronunciation: [fəɡəˈraʃ], Hungarian: Fogarasi vár, German: Fogarascher Burg) is a historic monument in Făgăraș, Brașov County, Romania.

== History ==
The construction of the fortress started in 1310, on the site of a wooden fortification with earth ramparts from the 12th century. Archeological research shows that the old fortification was violently destroyed around the middle of the 13th century, presumably in connection with the Mongol invasion of 1241. Located halfway between Brașov and Sibiu and close to Wallachia, the Făgăraș Citadel provided a defensive position against possible incursions into south-eastern Transylvania.

In 1526, István Majláth consolidated the citadel, doubling the thickness of the walls. In 1541, the Ottomans attacked the fortress and captured Mailat, who died in captivity at Yedikule Fortress in Istanbul. Gáspár Bekes, owner of the citadel between 1567 and 1573, constructed the moat around the fortress, the excavated earth being used to strengthen the inner part of the walls. During the time of Stephen VIII Báthory (voivode of Transylvania from 1571 to 1586) and Balthasar Báthory (lord of the fortress from 1588 to 1594), the first bastion was constructed in the south-eastern corner of the outer defensive ring. In 1599, Michael the Brave occupied Făgăraș Citadel and sheltered there his family and the royal treasure. In the 17th century, Prince Gabriel Bethlen gave it priority over Alba Iulia in modernizing the fortifications, while Michael I Apafi transformed it, due to its strengthened position, into a princely residence. It functioned as a garrison from 1689, preserving its military function after the union of Transylvania with Romania.

In 1950, the citadel was converted into a prison for political detainees. It was ideally suited for this purpose: the surrounding moat, high walls two to three meters thick, barred windows and geometric shape allowing sentinels to guard the interior and exterior all combined to make escape practically impossible. The exterior fortifications were used by the Securitate secret police as an operational base in their struggle against the anti-communist resistance fighters in the Făgăraș Mountains. The prison housed former cadres of the Siguranța and the Police. In early 1950, the citadel held 101 common criminals. Over 800 political prisoners arrived from Târgșor in autumn, among them generals Vasile Zorzor, Gheorghe Liteanu and Emanoil Leoveanu; they all died in detention at Făgăraș in the 1950s. Generals Ioan Popescu and Gheorghe Linteș also perished here in 1954–55. Over a hundred other prisoners arrived early in 1951. Some 400 were sent to the Danube–Black Sea Canal in 1951–1952, returning in 1954. The prisoners at Făgăraș were held without trial or sentence. Peasants also passed through: opponents of collectivization would spend a few weeks or months before being freed, while those who aided Ion Gavrilă Ogoranu’s partisans were locked up for longer periods. Around 100 condemned war criminals were brought from Aiud in 1955. In 1957, 80 sympathizers of the Hungarian Revolution were brought from Sibiu to the citadel: mostly workers and peasants, but also Onisifor Ghibu. By that time, the prison was becoming overcrowded, with some prisoners held despite their arrest warrants having expired. In all, some 5000 people were detained at this location, many of whom were subjected to torture.

During the decade of its existence, 161 detainees died in the prison due to poor conditions; former detainees put the death toll much higher. Food consisted of relatively fresh bread and a barely edible corn gruel. There were no doctors to care for sick prisoners. The bathrooms did not function, producing a horrible smell, especially in summer. There were hardly any brooms for cleaning the cells. Cold was also a problem. In late 1959, the Stalin Region council requested to take over the citadel, citing its historical status and the need to maintain it properly. Four groups of over 100 detainees each were sent to Gherla in February 1960, shortly thereafter followed by a smaller number of common criminals. Thus, the citadel’s status as a prison ended.

Between 1965 and 1977 restoration work was carried out. Currently, the citadel functions as a museum, housing various artifacts.

== Gallery ==
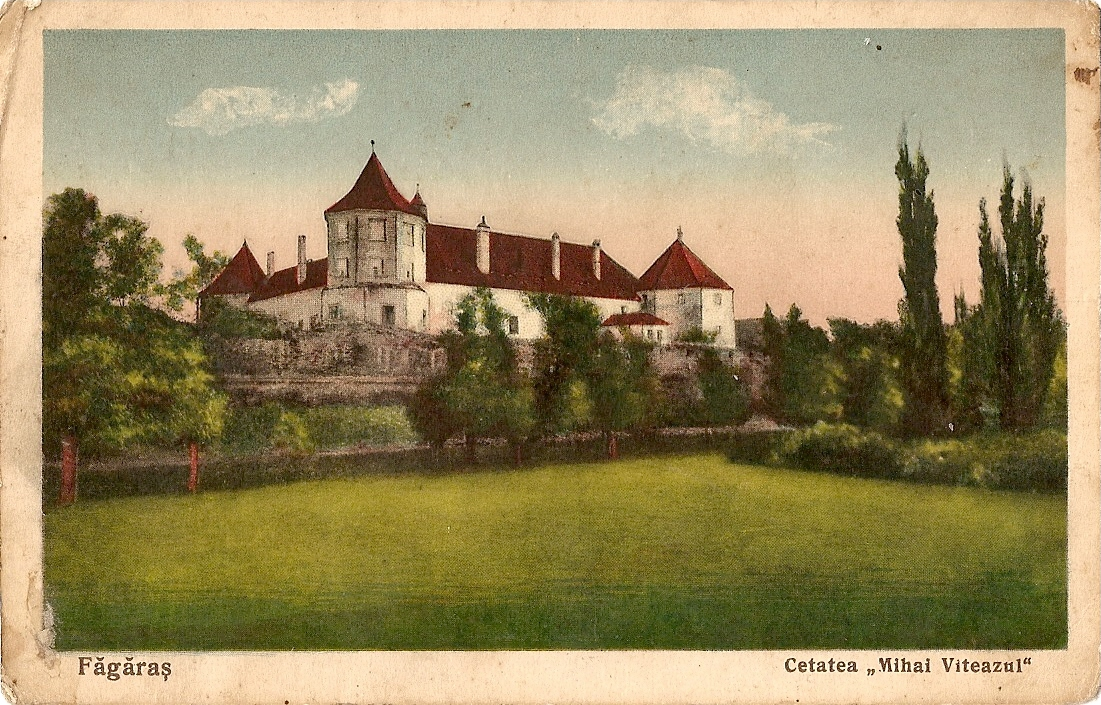
View of the citadel in the interwar period

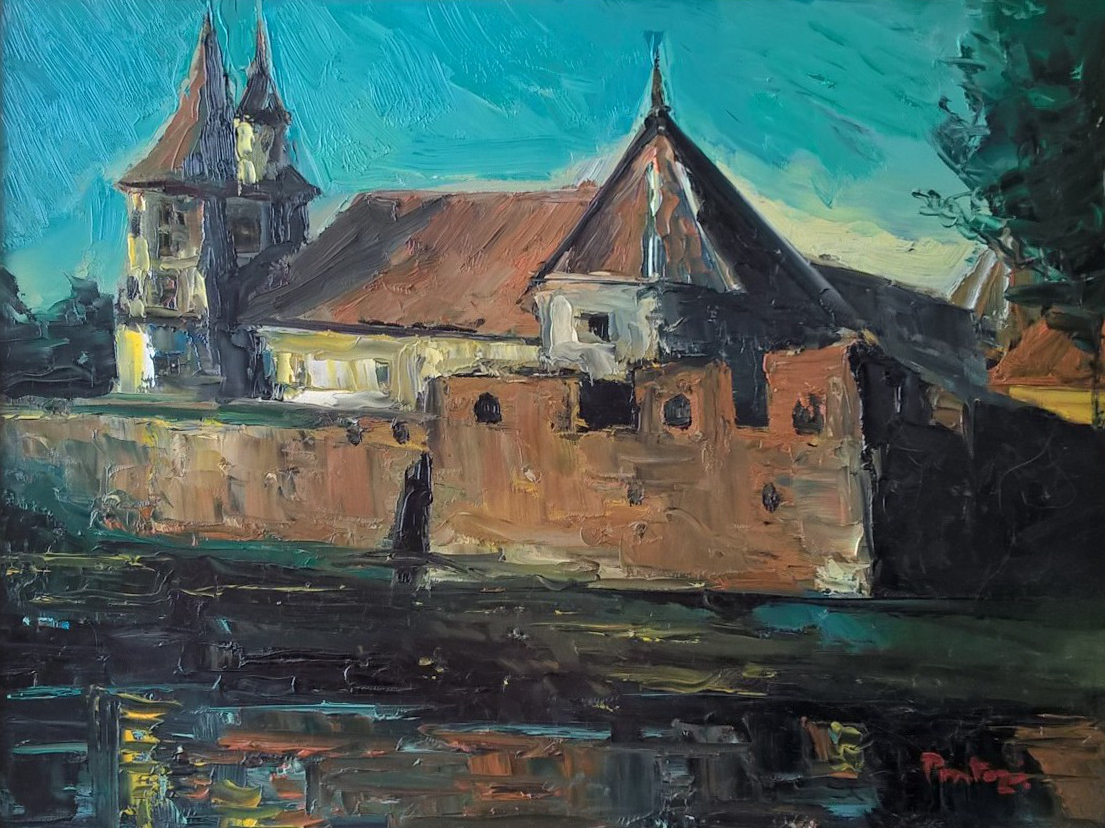
„Twilight at Făgăraş Citadel”, painting by Valeriu Pantazi

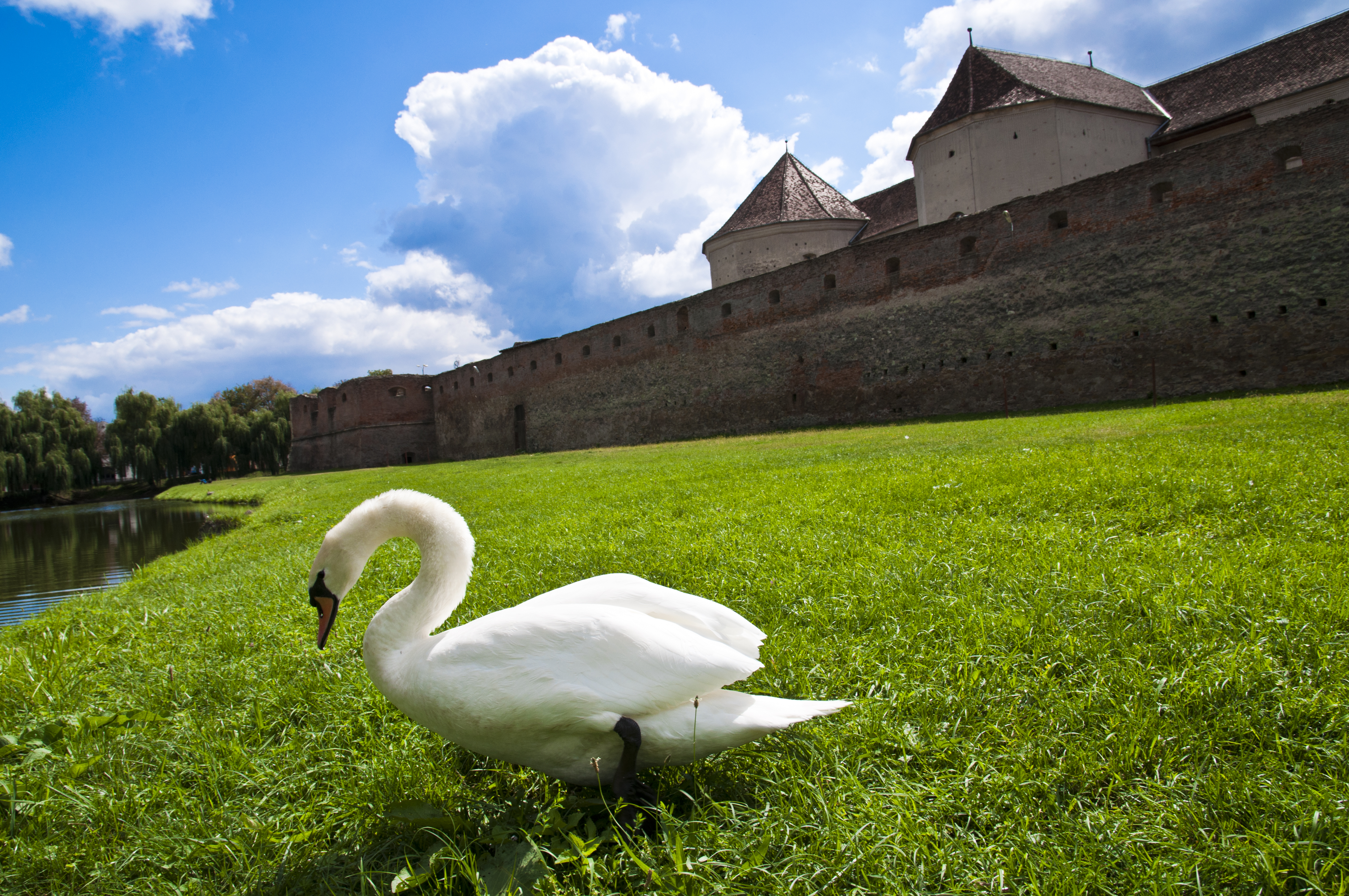

== See also ==
- Tourism in Romania
- Seven Wonders of Romania
