= Michael the Brave =

Ruler of Wallachia, Moldavia, and Transylvania (1558–1601)

- Prince of Wallachia; Imperial governor of Transylvania; Prince of Moldavia
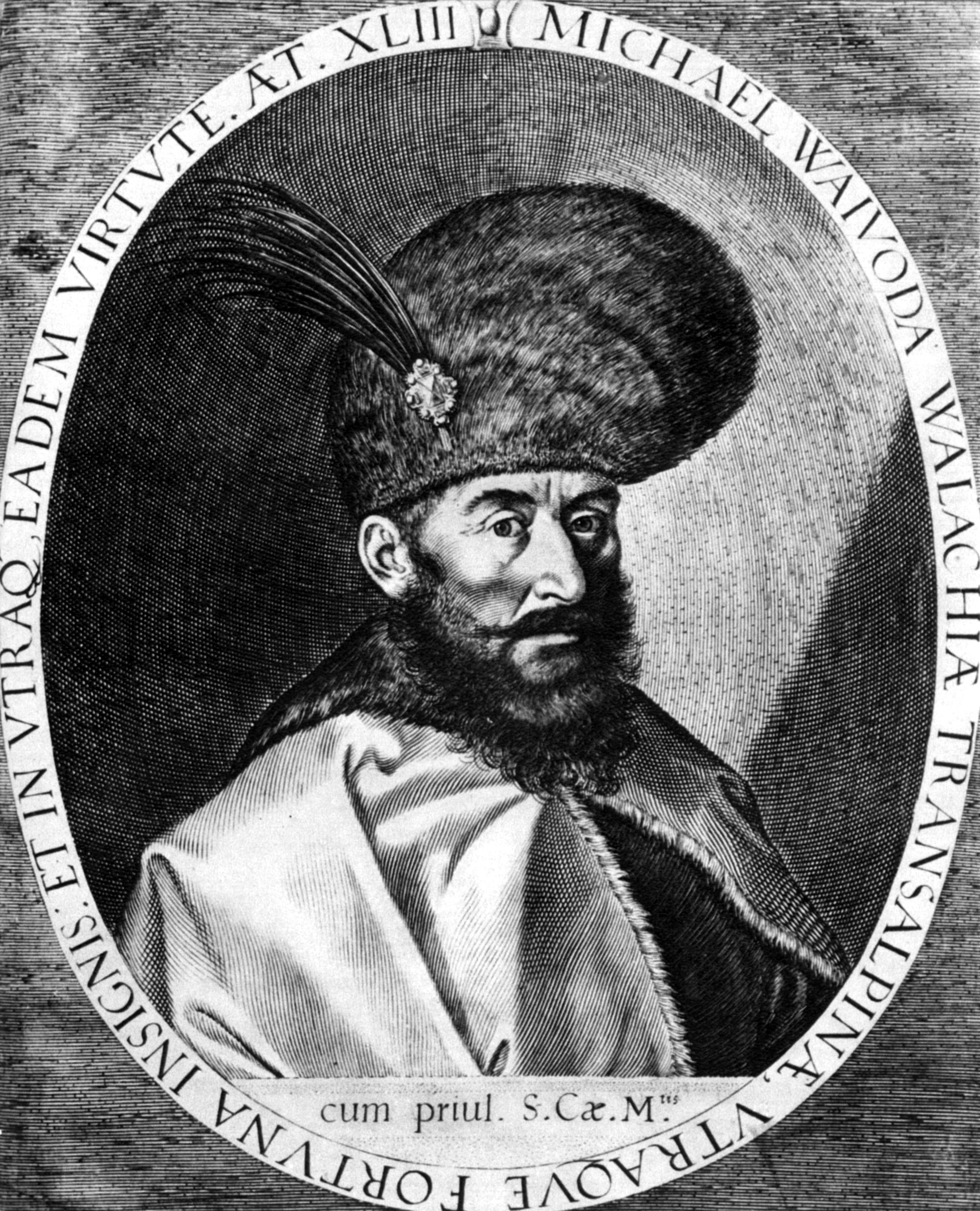
- Portrait by Aegidius Sadeler II, 1601

Prince of Wallachia
- Reign: September 1593 – August 1601
- Predecessor: Alexandru cel Rău
- Successor: Radu Mihnea

Prince of Transylvania (de facto)
- Reign: October 1599 – September 1600
- Predecessor: Andrew Báthory
- Successor: Sigismund Báthory

Prince of Moldavia
- Reign: May – September 1600
- Predecessor: Ieremia Movilă
- Successor: Ieremia Movilă
- Born: Mihai Pătrașcu; 15 January 1558; Târgul de Floci (near Giurgeni), Wallachia
- Died: 9 August 1601 (aged 42–43); Torda, Principality of Transylvania (now Turda, Romania)
- Burial: 12 August 1601; Alba Iulia or Bogata, Cluj County (body); Dealu Monastery, Dâmbovița County (head)
- Spouse: Doamna Stanca
- Issue: Nicolae Pătrașcu; Domnița Florica
- House: Drăculești
- Father: Pătrașcu cel Bun
- Mother: Teodora Cantacuzino
- Religion: Orthodox Christian
- Military career
- Branch: Wallachian military forces
- Conflicts: See list: Long Turkish War; Battle of Călugăreni; Battle of Giurgiu (1595); Battle of Șelimbăr; Battle of Mirăslău; Battle of Guruslău; Moldavian Magnate Wars; Battle of Bucov

Michael the Brave (Romanian: Mihai Viteazul [miˈhaj viˈte̯azul] or Mihai Bravu [ˈbravu]; 1558 – 9 August 1601), born as Mihai Pătrașcu, was the Prince of Wallachia (as Michael II, 1593–1601), Prince of Moldavia (1600) and de facto ruler of Transylvania (1599–1600). He is considered one of Romania's greatest national heroes. Since the 19th century, Michael the Brave has been regarded by Romanian nationalists as a symbol of Romanian unity, as his reign marked the first time in history all principalities inhabited by Romanians were under the same ruler.

His rule over Wallachia began in the autumn of 1593. Two years later, war with the Ottomans began, a conflict in which the Prince fought the Battle of Călugăreni, resulting in a victory against an army nearly three times the size of the army of Michael the Brave, considered one of the most important battles of his reign. Although the Wallachians emerged victorious from the battle, Michael was forced to retreat with his troops and wait for aid from his allies, Prince Sigismund Báthory of Transylvania and Holy Roman Emperor Rudolf II. The war continued until a peace finally emerged in January 1597, but this lasted for only a year and a half. Peace was again reached in late 1599, when Michael was unable to continue the war due to lack of support from his allies. In 1599, Michael won the Battle of Șelimbăr against Andrew Báthory and soon entered Gyulafehérvár (today Alba Iulia, Romania), becoming the imperial governor (i.e. de facto ruler) of Transylvania, under Habsburg suzerainty. A few months later, Michael's troops invaded Moldavia and reached its capital, Iași. The Moldavian leader Ieremia Movilă fled to Poland and Michael was declared Prince of Moldavia. During this period, Michael the Brave changed his seal to represent his personal union of Wallachia, Moldavia, and Transylvania.

The interests of the three neighbouring great powers – the Habsburg monarchy, the Ottoman Empire, and the Polish–Lithuanian Commonwealth – were damaged by Michael the Brave's achievements. Although he acknowledged the suzerainty of Rudolf II, Michael the Brave continued to negotiate his official position in Transylvania, pleading for direct rule instead of being imperial governor. Michael kept the control of all three provinces for less than a year before the Hungarian nobility of Transylvania rose against him in a series of revolts with the support of the Austrian army commanded by the Italian General Giorgio Basta, defeating Michael the Brave at the Battle of Mirăslău, forcing the prince to leave Transylvania and retreat to Wallachia with his remaining troops, while the forces of the Polish–Lithuanian Commonwealth entered Moldavia and defeated the forces loyal to Michael the Brave, restoring Ieremia Movilă on the throne. The Polish army led by Jan Zamoyski also advanced in eastern Wallachia and established Simion Movilă as ruler. Forces loyal to Michael remained only in Oltenia.

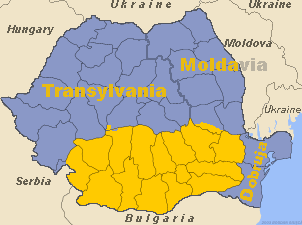
Map of Wallachia (yellow) over modern-day Romania (blue and yellow).

Michael the Brave then left for Prague, seeking audience with Emperor Rudolf II; however, the emperor refused to allow him audience. But General Giorgio Basta's governance of Transylvania faced significant opposition from the Hungarian nobility, leading to the reinstallation of Sigismund Báthory, who turned his back on Emperor Rudolf II and declared submission to the Polish–Lithuanian Commonwealth after receiving substantial military support. This led to Emperor Rudolf II accepting Michael the Brave's audience and providing him with 100,000 florins to rebuild his army. Meanwhile, forces loyal to Michael in Wallachia led by his son, Nicolae Pătrașcu, drove Simion Movilă out of Moldavia and prepared to reenter Transylvania. Michael the Brave, allied with Giorgio Basta, defeated the Hungarian army at the Battle of Guruslău. A few days later Basta, who sought to control Transylvania himself, assassinated Michael by order of the Habsburg Emperor Rudolf II.

== Early life ==
Michael was born in 1558. He claimed to have been the illegitimate son of Wallachian Prince Pătrașcu cel Bun (Pătrașcu the Good), of the Drăculești branch of the House of Basarab, close to the Septilici family; some historians believe he merely invented his descent in order to justify his rule. His real father was most likely a Greek merchant. His mother was Theodora Kantakouzene, a member of the Greek noble family Kantakouzenoi, present in Wallachia and Moldavia, and allegedly descended from the Byzantine Emperor John VI Kantakouzenos. She was born in the Greek region of Epirus and she may have been the sister of the famous Greek magnate Michael Kantakouzenos Şeytanoğlu, as well as the cousin of Iane Cantacuzino. Michael could probably speak Greek too, besides Romanian.

Michael's political rise was quite spectacular, as he became the Ban of Mehedinți in 1588, stolnic at the court of Mihnea Turcitul by the end of 1588, and Ban of Craiova in 1593 – during the rule of Alexandru cel Rău. The latter had him swear before 12 boyars that he was not of princely descent. Still, in May 1593 conflict did break out between Alexandru and Michael, who was forced to flee to Transylvania. He was accompanied by his half-brother Radu Florescu, Radu Buzescu and several other supporters. After spending two weeks at the court of Sigismund Báthory, he left for Constantinople, where with help from his cousin Andronikos Kantakouzenos (the eldest son of Michael "Şeytanoğlu" Kantakouzenos) and Patriarch Jeremiah II he negotiated Ottoman support for his accession to the Wallachian throne. He was supported by the English ambassador in the Ottoman capital, Edward Barton, and aided by a loan of 200,000 florins. Michael was invested Prince by Sultan Murad III in September 1593 and started his effective rule on 11 October.

== Wallachia ==
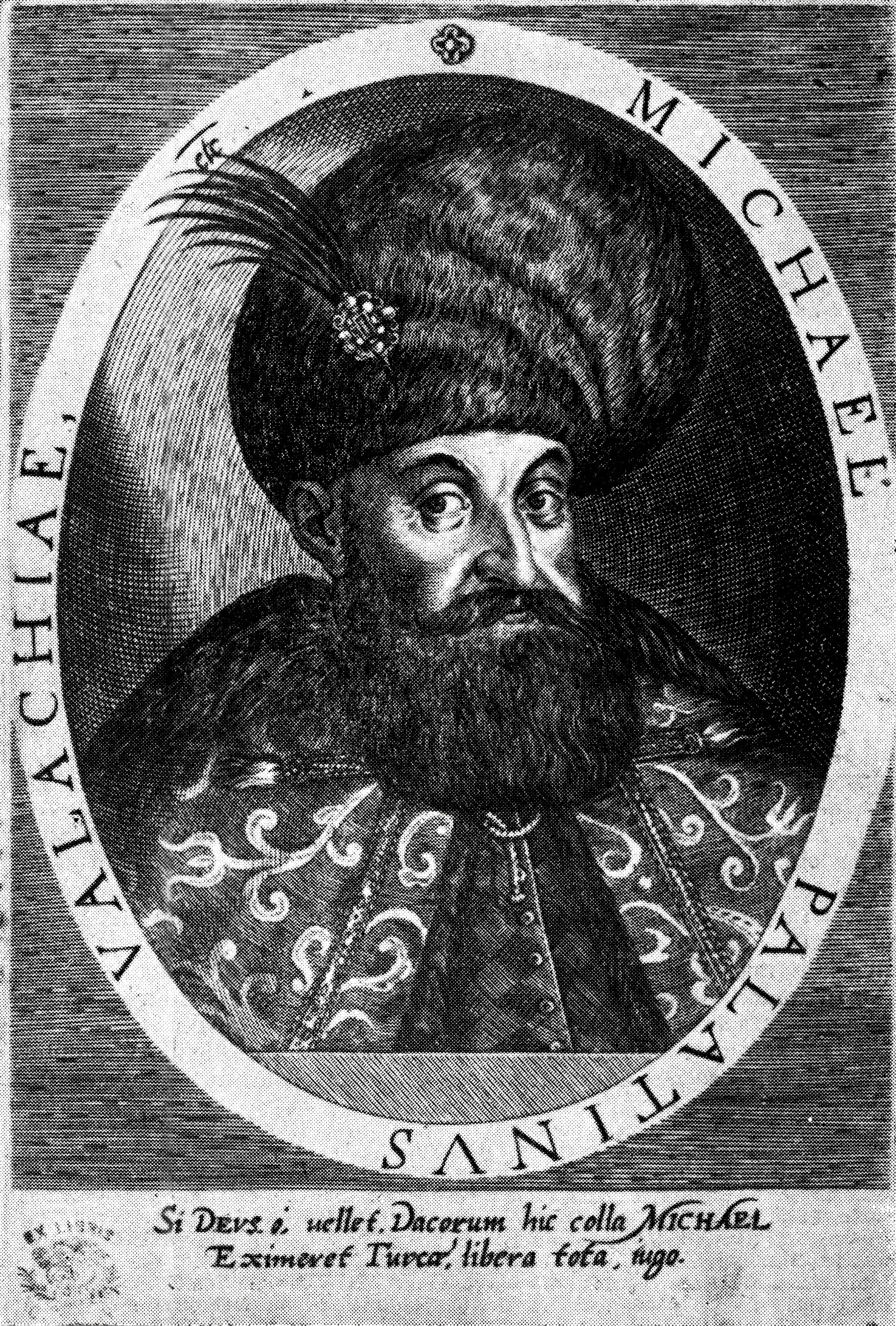
Engraving of Michael the Brave

Not long after Michael became Prince of Wallachia, he turned against the Ottoman Empire. The next year he joined the Christian alliance of European powers formed by Pope Clement VIII against the Turks, and signed treaties with his neighbours: Sigismund Báthory of Transylvania, Aaron the Tyrant of Moldavia and the Holy Roman Emperor, Rudolf II (see Holy League of Pope Clement VIII). He started a campaign against the Turks in the autumn of 1594, conquering several citadels near the Danube, including Giurgiu, Brăila, Hârșova, and Silistra, while his Moldavian allies defeated the Turks in Iași and other parts of Moldavia. Michael continued his attacks deep within the Ottoman Empire, taking the forts of Nicopolis, Ribnic, and Chilia with his soldiers raiding as far as Razgrad, which led to rumors that his army reached Adrianople.

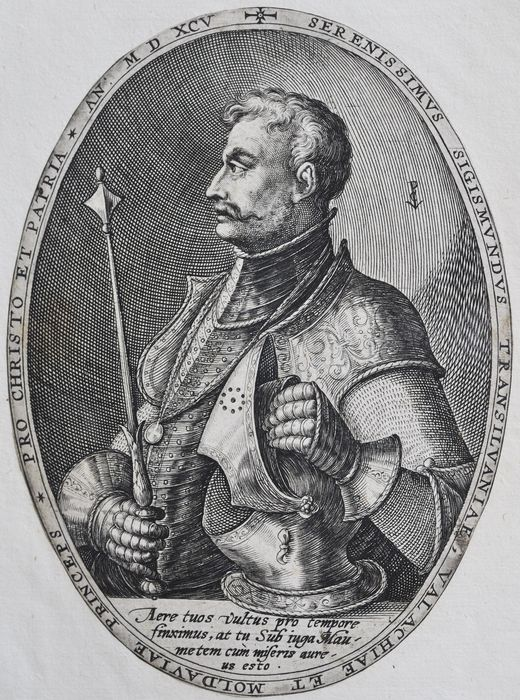
Sigismund Báthory using the title Prince of Transylvania, Wallachia and Moldavia in a 1595 engraving.

In 1595, Sigismund Báthory staged an elaborate plot and had Aaron the Tyrant, voivode of Moldavia, removed from power. István Jósika (Báthory's chancellor and an ethnic Romanian) masterminded the operation. Ștefan Răzvan arrested Aron on charges of treason on the night of 24 April (5 May) and sent him to the Transylvanian capital at Gyulafehérvár with his family and treasure. Aron would die poisoned by the end of May in the castle of Vinc. Sigismund was forced to justify his actions before the European powers, since Aron had played an active role in the anti-Ottoman coalition. Later on, in the same city of Gyulafehérvár (Alba Iulia, in Romania of today), Wallachian boyars signed a treaty with Sigismund on Michael's behalf. From the point of view of Wallachian internal politics, the "Treaty of Gyulafehérvár" codified what could be called a boyar regime, reinforcing the already important political power of the noble elite. According to the treaty, a council of 12 great boyars was to take part alongside the voivode in the executive rule of the country.

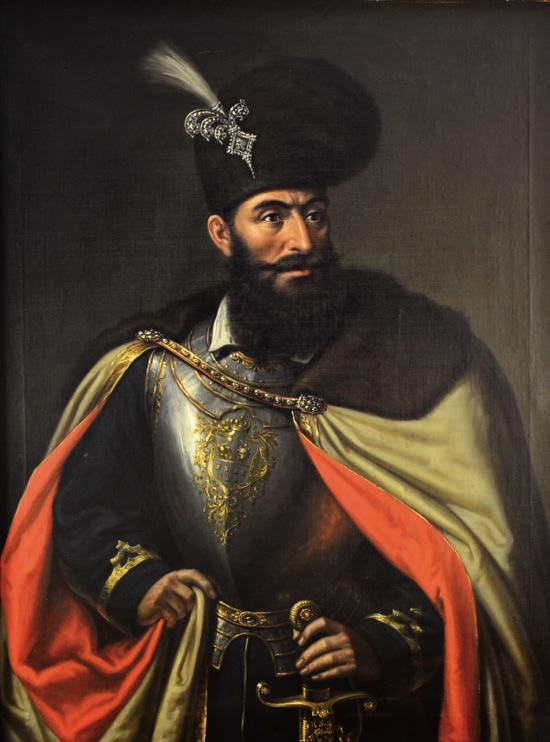
Michael the Brave, early 20th-century mural painting

Boyars could no longer be executed without the knowledge and approval of the Transylvanian Prince and, if convicted for treason, their fortunes could no longer be confiscated. Apparently Michael was displeased with the final form of the treaty negotiated by his envoys, but was forced to comply. Prince Michael said in a conversation with the Polish envoy Lubieniecki: ... they did not proceed as stated in their instructions but as their own good required and obtained privileges for themselves. He would try to avoid the obligations imposed on him for the rest of his reign.

During his reign, Michael relied heavily on the loyalty and support of a group of Oltenian lords, the most important of whom were Buzescu Brothers (Romanian: Frații Buzești) and his own relatives on his mother's side, the Cantacuzinos. He consequently protected their interests throughout his reign; for example, he passed a law binding serfs to lands owned by aristocrats. From the standpoint of religious jurisdiction, the Treaty of Gyulafehérvár had another important consequence: it placed all the Eastern Orthodox bishops in Transylvania under the jurisdiction of the Metropolitan Seat of Târgoviște.

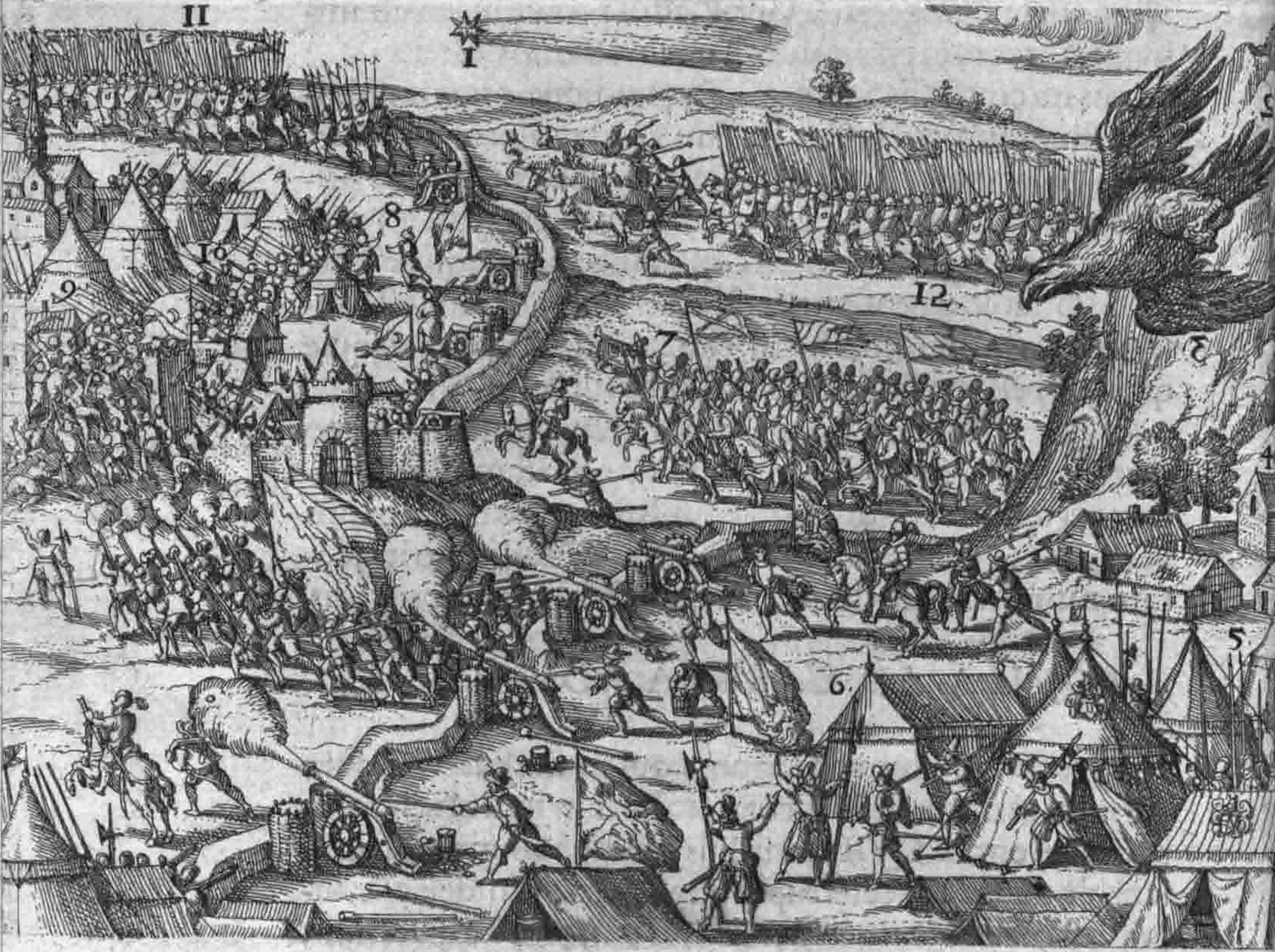
A contemporary illustration of Michael the Brave defeating the Turks at Târgovişte in October 1595

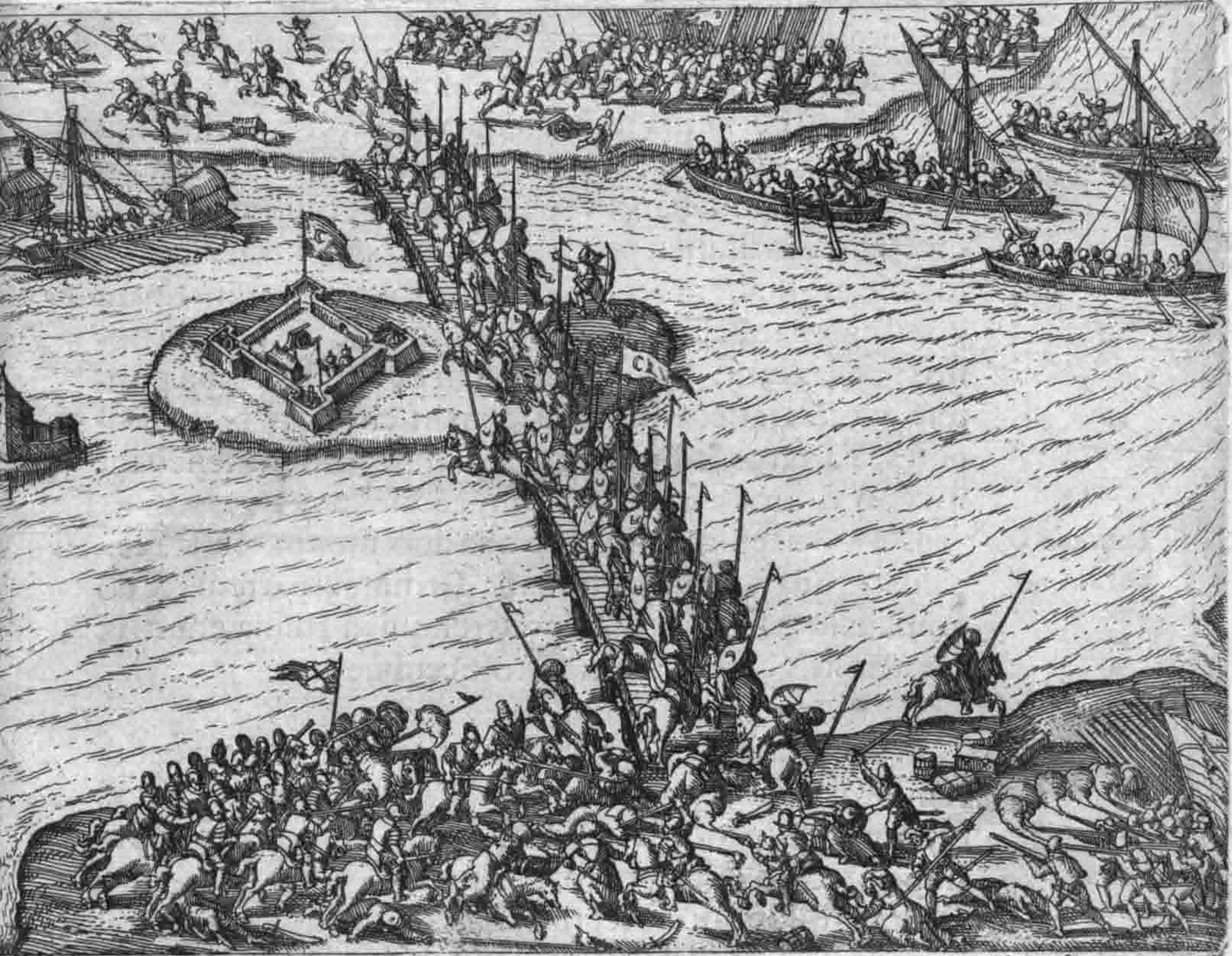
A depiction the Battle of Giurgiu in October 1595, first published in 1596

During this period, the Ottoman army, based in Ruse, was preparing to cross the Danube and undertake a major attack. Michael was quickly forced to retreat and the Ottoman forces started to cross the Danube on 4 August 1595. As his army was outnumbered, Michael avoided carrying the battle in open field, and decided to give battle on a marshy field located near the village of Călugăreni on the Neajlov river. The Battle of Călugăreni started on 13 August and Michael defeated the Ottoman army led by Sinan Pasha. Despite the victory, he retreated to his winter camp in Stoienești because he had too few troops to mount a full-scale war against the remaining Ottoman forces. He subsequently joined forces with Sigismund Báthory's 40,000-man army (led by Stephen Bocskai) and counterattacked the Ottomans, freeing the towns of Târgoviște (8 October), Bucharest (12 October) and Brăila, temporarily removing Wallachia from Ottoman suzerainty.

The fight against the Ottomans continued in 1596 when Michael made several incursions south of the Danube at Vidin, Pleven, Nicopolis, and Babadag, where he was assisted by the local Bulgarians during the First Tarnovo Uprising.

During late 1596, Michael was faced with an unexpected attack from the Tatars, who had destroyed the towns of Bucharest and Buzău. By the time Michael gathered his army to counterattack, the Tatars had speedily retreated and so no battle was fought. Michael was determined to continue the war against the Ottomans, but he was prevented because he lacked support from Sigismund Báthory and Rudolf II. On 7 January 1597 Hasan Pasha declared the independence of Wallachia under Michael's rule, but Michael knew that this was only an attempt to divert him from preparing for another future attack. Michael again requested Rudolf II's support and Rudolf finally agreed to send financial assistance to the Wallachian ruler. On 9 June 1598 a formal treaty was reached between Michael and Rudolf II. According to the treaty, the Austrian ruler would give Wallachia sufficient money to maintain a 5,000-man army, as well as armaments and supplies. Shortly after the treaty was signed, the war with the Ottomans resumed and Michael besieged Nicopolis on 10 September 1598 and took control of Vidin. The war with the Ottomans continued until 26 June 1599, when Michael, lacking the resources and support to continue prosecuting the war, signed a peace treaty.

== Transylvania ==
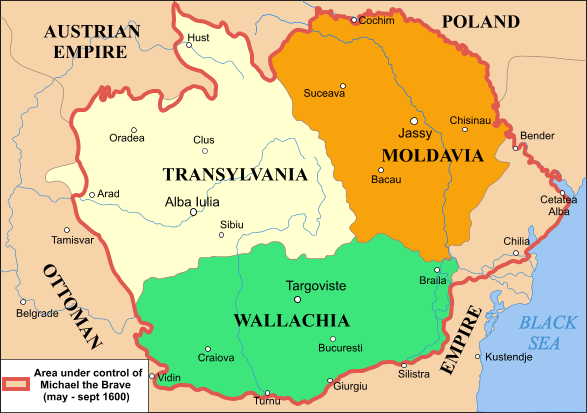
The three principalities under Michael's authority, May–September 1600

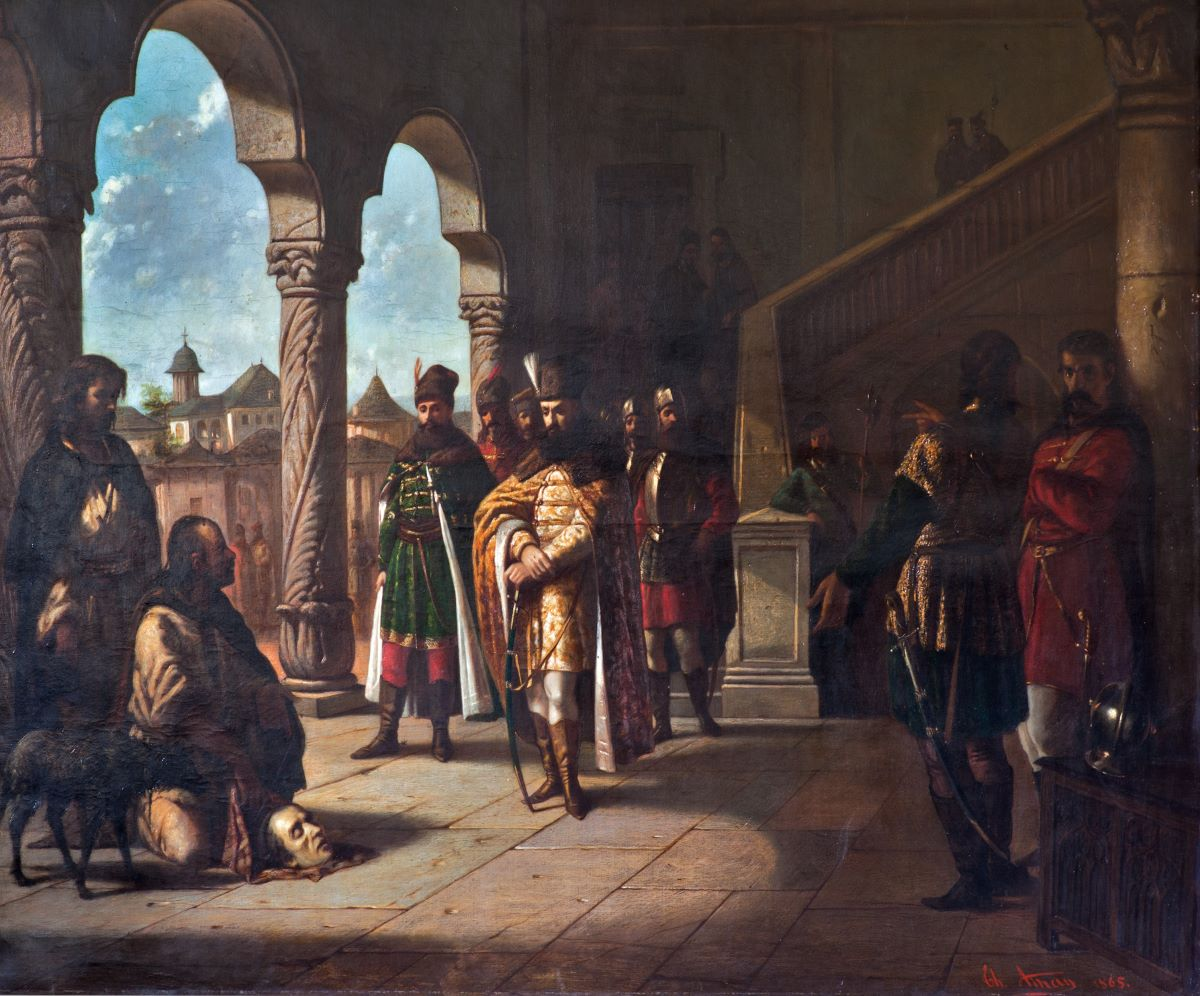
Székelys bring the head of cardinal Andrew Báthory to Michael the Brave after the Battle of Șelimbăr

In April 1598, Sigismund resigned as Prince of Transylvania in favour of the Holy Roman Emperor, Rudolf II (who was also the King of Hungary); reversed his decision in October 1598; and then resigned again in favour of Cardinal Andrew Báthory, his cousin. Báthory had strong ties to the Polish chancellor and hetman Jan Zamoyski and placed Transylvania under the influence of the King of Poland, Sigismund III Vasa. He was also a trusted ally of the new Moldavian Prince Ieremia Movilă, one of Michael's greatest enemies. Movilă had deposed Ștefan Răzvan with the help of Polish hetman Jan Zamoyski in August 1595.

Having to face this new threat, Michael asked Emperor Rudolf to become the sovereign of Wallachia. On 25 September, Báthory issued an ultimatum demanding that Michael abandon his throne. Michael decided to attack Andrew Cardinal Báthory immediately to prevent invasion. He would later describe the events:

I rose with my country, my children, taking my wife and everything I had and with my army [marched into Transylvania] so that the foe should not crush me here.

He left Târgoviște on 2 October, and 9 by October he had reached Prejmer in southern Transylvania, where he met envoys from the city of Brassó (today Brașov, Romania). Sparing the city, he moved on to Kerc (today Cârța, Romania), where he joined forces with the Székelys.

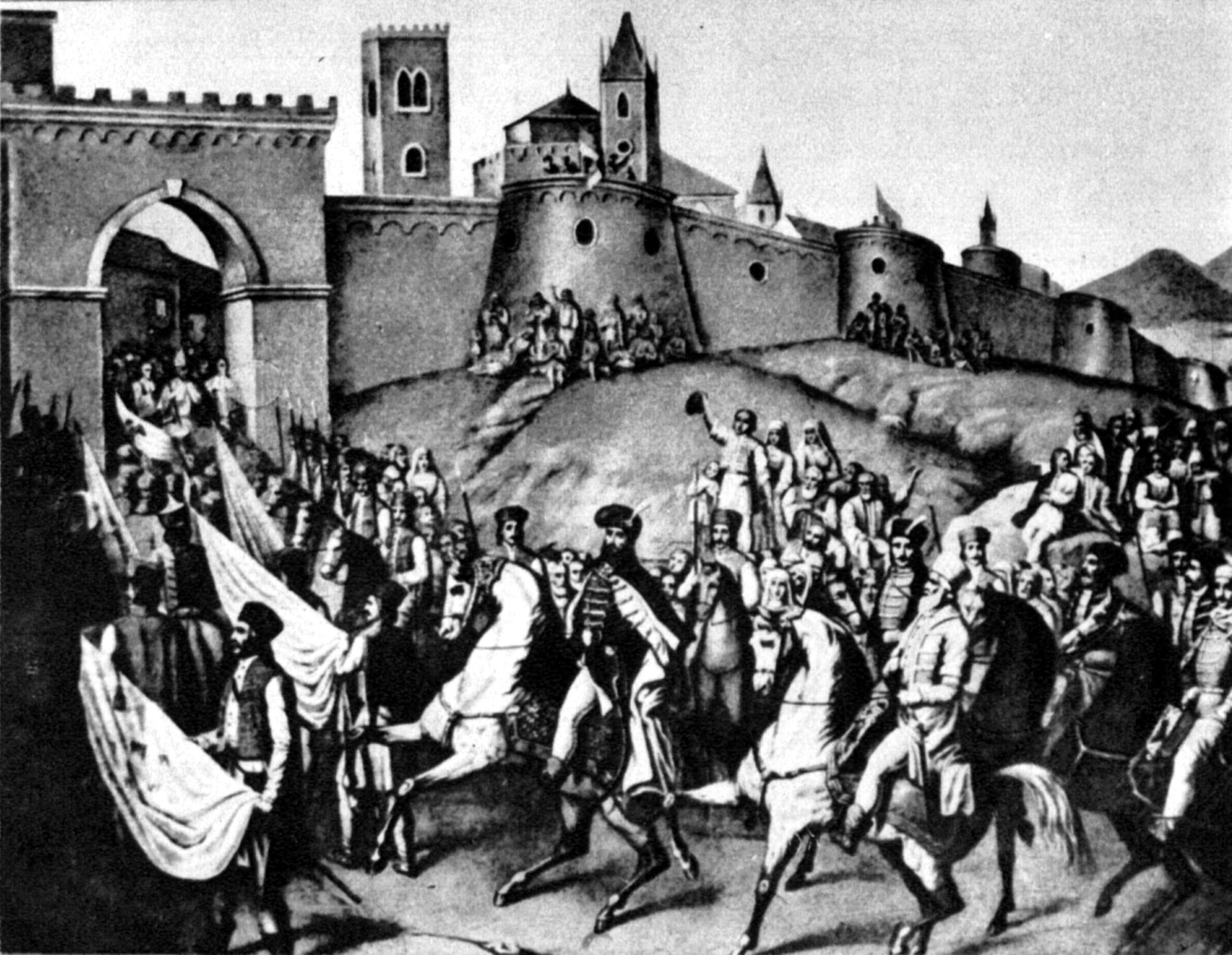
Michael the Brave entering Alba Iulia

On 18 October 1599 Michael won a decisive victory against the army of prince-cardinal Andrew Báthory at the Battle of Șelimbăr, giving him control of Transylvania. As he retreated from the battle, Andrew Báthory was killed by anti-Báthory Székely on 3 November near Csíkszentdomokos (today Sândominic, Romania) and Michael gave him a princely burial in the Roman Catholic Cathedral of Gyulafehérvár. With his enemy dead, Michael entered the Transylvanian capital at Gyulafehérvár and received the keys to the fortress from Bishop Demeter Naprágyi, later depicted as a seminal event in Romanian historiography. Historian István Szamosközy, keeper of the Archives at the time, recorded the event in great detail. He also wrote that two days before the Diet met on 10 October, Transylvanian nobles elected Michael the voivode as Prince of Transylvania. As the Diet was assembled, Michael demanded that the estates swear loyalty to Emperor Rudolf, then to himself and thirdly to his son. Even if he was recognized by the Transylvanian diet as only imperial governor subject to the Holy Roman Emperor, he was nonetheless ruler of Transylvania.

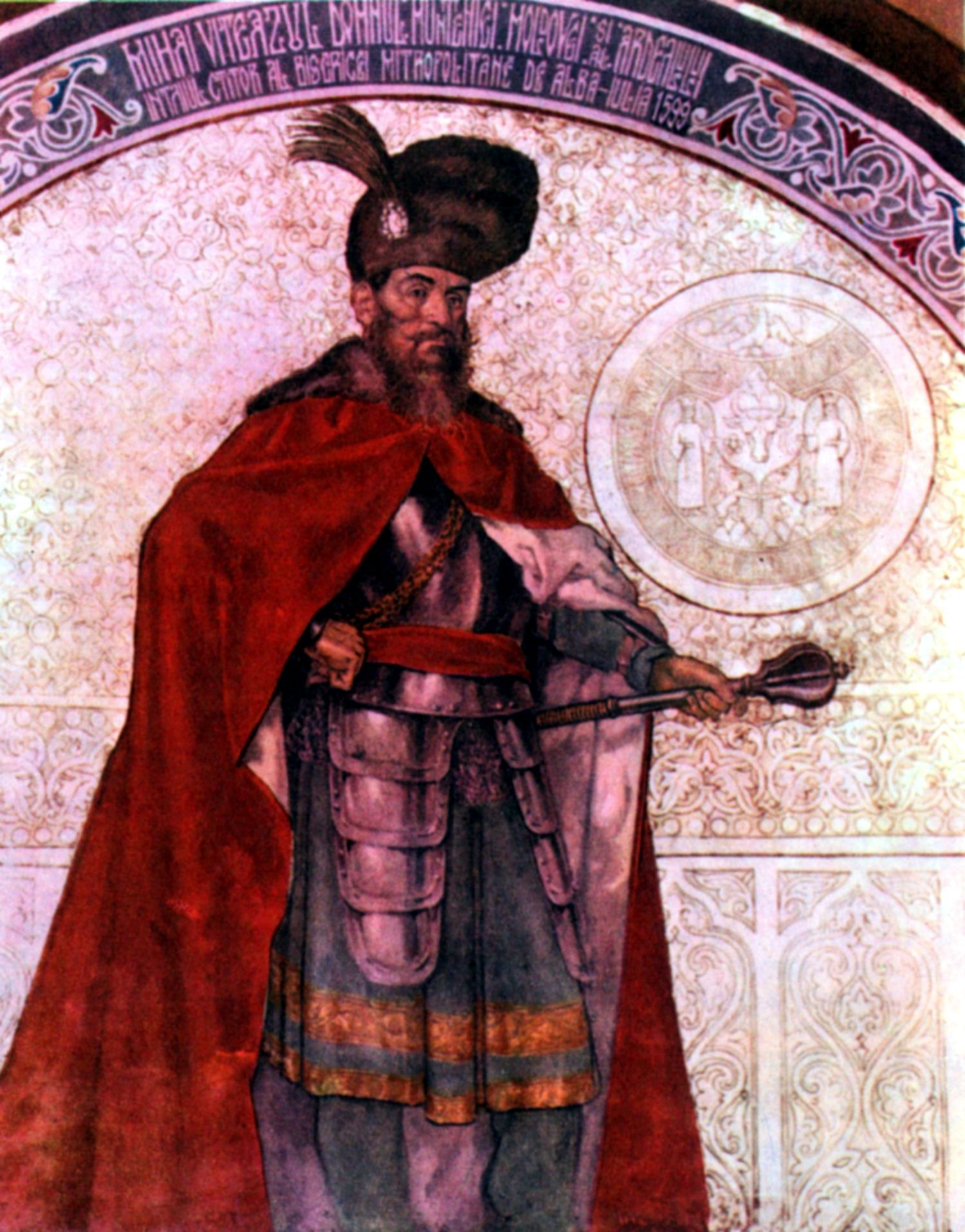
Michael the Brave at Alba Iulia, portrait by Mișu Popp

In Transylvania Michael used the following signature on official documents: Michael Valachiae Transalpinae Woivoda, Sacrae Caesareae Regiae Majestatis Consiliarius per Transylvaniam Locumtenens, cis transylvaniam partium eius super exercitu Generalis Capitaneus". ("Michael, voivode of Wallachia, the councillor of His Majesty the Emperor and the King, his deputy in Transylvania and General Captain of his troops from Transylvania.")

When Michael entered Transylvania, he did not immediately free or grant rights to the Romanian inhabitants, who were primarily peasants but, nevertheless, constituted a significant proportion (Note: ~60% in 1600 according to George W. White and ~28.4% in 1595 according to Károly Kocsis & Eszter Kocsisné Hodosi) of the population. Michael demonstrated his support by upholding the Union of the Three Nations, which acknowledged only the traditional rights and privileges of the Hungarians, Székelys and Saxons, but he did not recognize the rights of the Romanians. Indeed, while he brought some of his Wallachian aides to Transylvania, he also invited some Székelys and other Transylvanian Hungarians to assist in the administration of Wallachia, where he wished to transplant Transylvania's far more advanced feudal system.

Michael began negotiating with the Emperor over his official position in Transylvania. The latter wanted the principality under direct Imperial rule with Michael acting as governor. The Wallachian voivode, on the other hand, wanted the title of Prince of Transylvania for himself and equally claimed the Partium region. Michael was, nevertheless, willing to acknowledge Habsburg overlordship.

== Moldavia ==
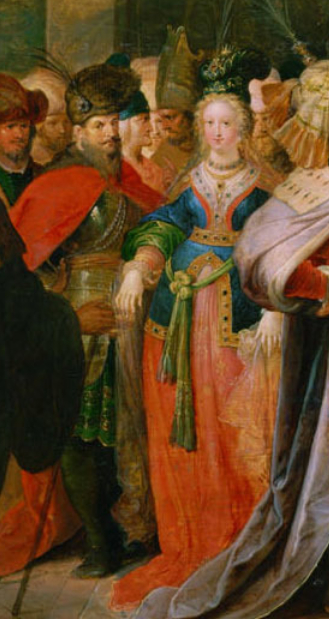
Michael the Brave and his daughter Florica at Rudolf's court (detail of a contemporary painting by Frans Francken the Younger)

The Moldavian Prince Ieremia Movilă had been an old enemy of Michael, having incited Andrew Báthory to send Michael the ultimatum demanding his abdication. His brother, Simion Movilă, claimed the Wallachian throne for himself and had used the title of Voivode since 1595. Aware of the threat the Movilăs represented, Michael had created the Banate of Buzău and Brăila in July 1598 and the new ban was charged of keeping an alert eye on Moldavian, Tatar, and Cossack moves, although Michael had been planning a Moldavian campaign for several years.

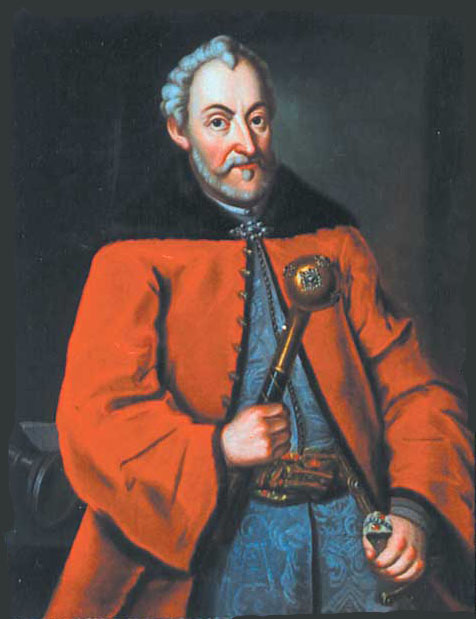
Chancellor Jan Zamoyski

On 28 February 1600 Michael met with Polish envoys in Brassó. He was willing to recognise the Polish King as his sovereign in exchange for the crown of Moldavia and the recognition of his male heirs' hereditary right over the three principalities, Transylvania, Moldavia, and Wallachia. This did not significantly delay his attack, however; on 14 April 1600 Michael's troops entered Moldavia on multiple routes, the Prince himself leading the main thrust to Trotuș and Roman. He reached the capital of Iași on 6 May. The garrison surrendered the citadel the next day and Michael's forces caught up with the fleeing Ieremia Movilă, who was saved from being captured only by the sacrifice of his rear-guard. Movilă took refuge in the castle of Hotin together with his family, a handful of faithful boyars and the former Transylvanian Prince, Sigismund Báthory. The Moldavian soldiers in the castle deserted, leaving a small Polish contingent as sole defenders. Under the cover of dark, sometime before 11 June, Movilă managed to sneak out of the walls and across the Dniester to hetman Stanisław Żółkiewski's camp.

Neighboring states were alarmed by this upsetting of the balance of power, especially the Hungarian nobility in Transylvania, who rose against Michael in rebellion. With the help of Basta, they defeated Michael at the Battle of Mirăslău, forcing the prince to leave Transylvania together with his remaining loyal troops. A Polish army led by Jan Zamoyski drove the Wallachians from Moldavia and defeated Michael at Năieni, Ceptura, and Bucov (Battle of the Teleajăn River). The Polish army also entered eastern Wallachia and established Simion Movilă as ruler. Forces loyal to Michael remained only in Oltenia.

== Last victory and assassination ==
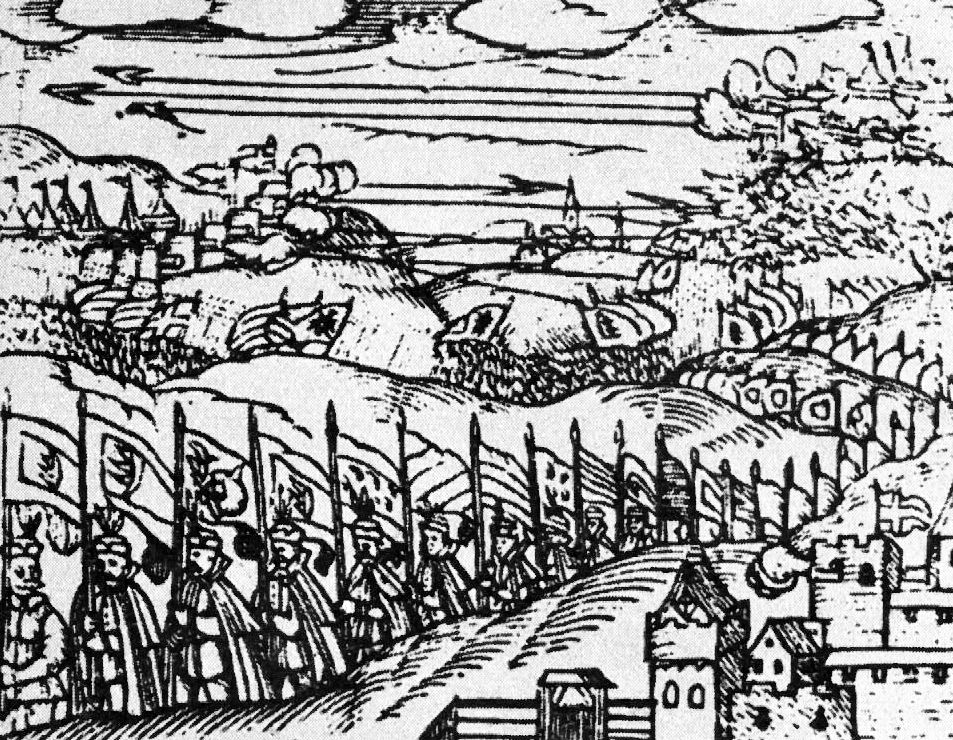
Michael defeating the Hungarian nobility in Battle of Guruslău, 1601

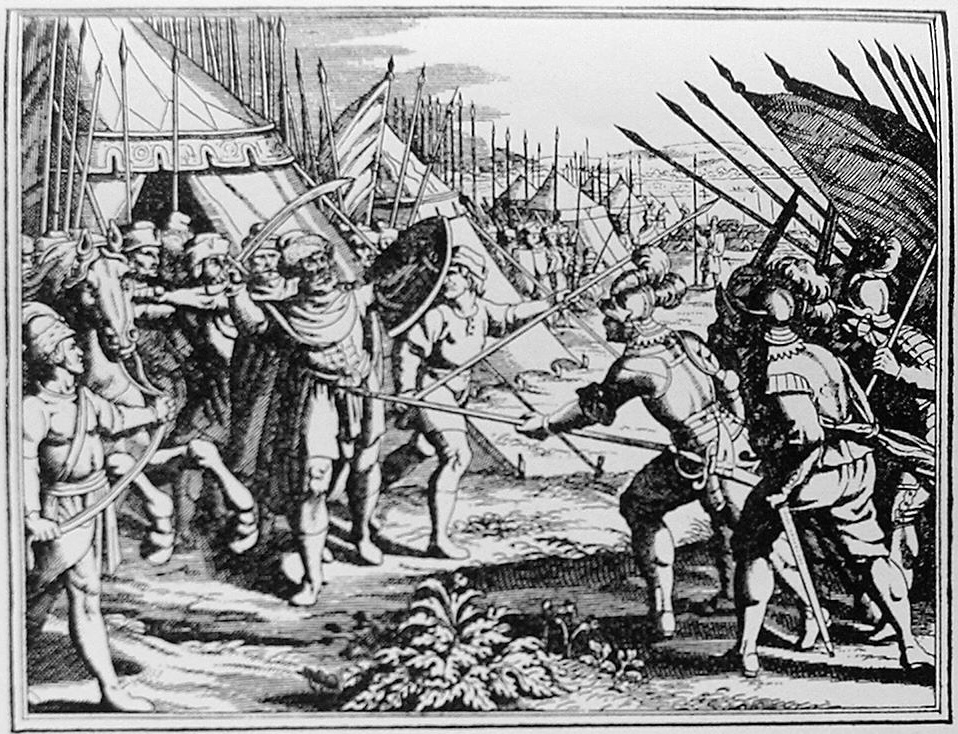
The assassination of Michael the Brave at Câmpia Turzii, 1601

Michael asked again for assistance from Emperor Rudolf II during a visit in Prague between 23 February and 5 March 1601, which was granted when the emperor heard that General Giorgio Basta had lost control of Transylvania to the Hungarian nobility led by Sigismund Báthory, who accepted Ottoman protection. Meanwhile, forces loyal to Michael in Wallachia led by his son, Nicolae Pătrașcu, drove Simion Movilă out of Wallachia and prepared to reenter Transylvania. Michael, allied with Basta, defeated the Hungarian army in Battle of Guruslău. A few days later, Basta, who sought to control Transylvania himself, assassinated Michael by order of the Habsburg Emperor; the killing took place near Câmpia Turzii on 9 August 1601. According to Romanian historian Constantin C. Giurescu:

Never in Romanian history was a moment of such highness and glory so closely followed by bitter failure.

== Legacy ==
The rule of Michael the Brave, with its break with Ottoman rule, tense relations with other European powers and the leadership of the three states, was considered in later periods as the precursor of a modern Romania, a thesis which was argued with noted intensity by Nicolae Bălcescu. This theory became a point of reference for nationalists, as well as a catalyst for various Romanian forces to achieve a single Romanian state. To Romanian Romantic nationalists, he was regarded as one of Romania's greatest national heroes. He is known in Romanian historiography as Mihai Viteazul or, less commonly, Mihai Bravu.

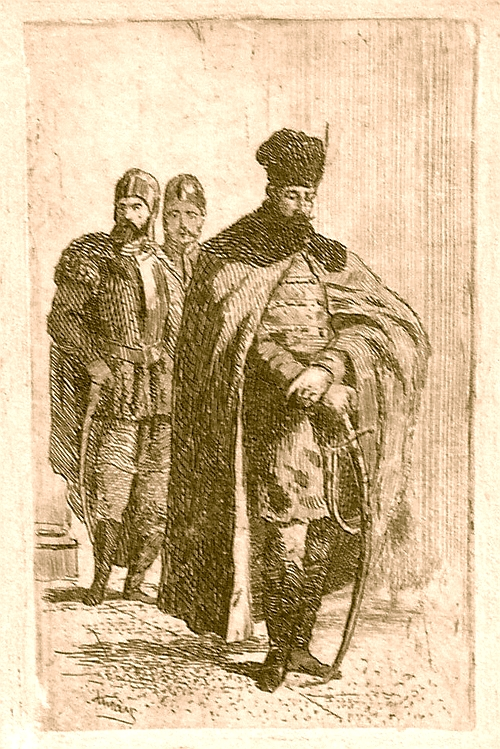
Portrait by Theodor Aman (1874)

The prince began to be perceived as a unifier towards the middle of the 19th century.

In the writings of the Moldavian chronicler Miron Costin, Michael the Brave appears in the role of conqueror of Transylvania and Moldavia, "the cause of much spilling of blood among Christians", and not even highly appreciated by his own Wallachians: "The Wallachians became tired of the warful rule of Voivode Mihai".

The perspective of the Wallachians themselves is to be found in The History of the Princes of Wallachia, attributed to the chronicler Radu Popescu (1655–1729), which bundles together all Michael's adversaries without distinction. Romanians and foreigners alike: "He subjected the Turks, the Moldavians, and the Hungarians to his rule, as if they were his asses."

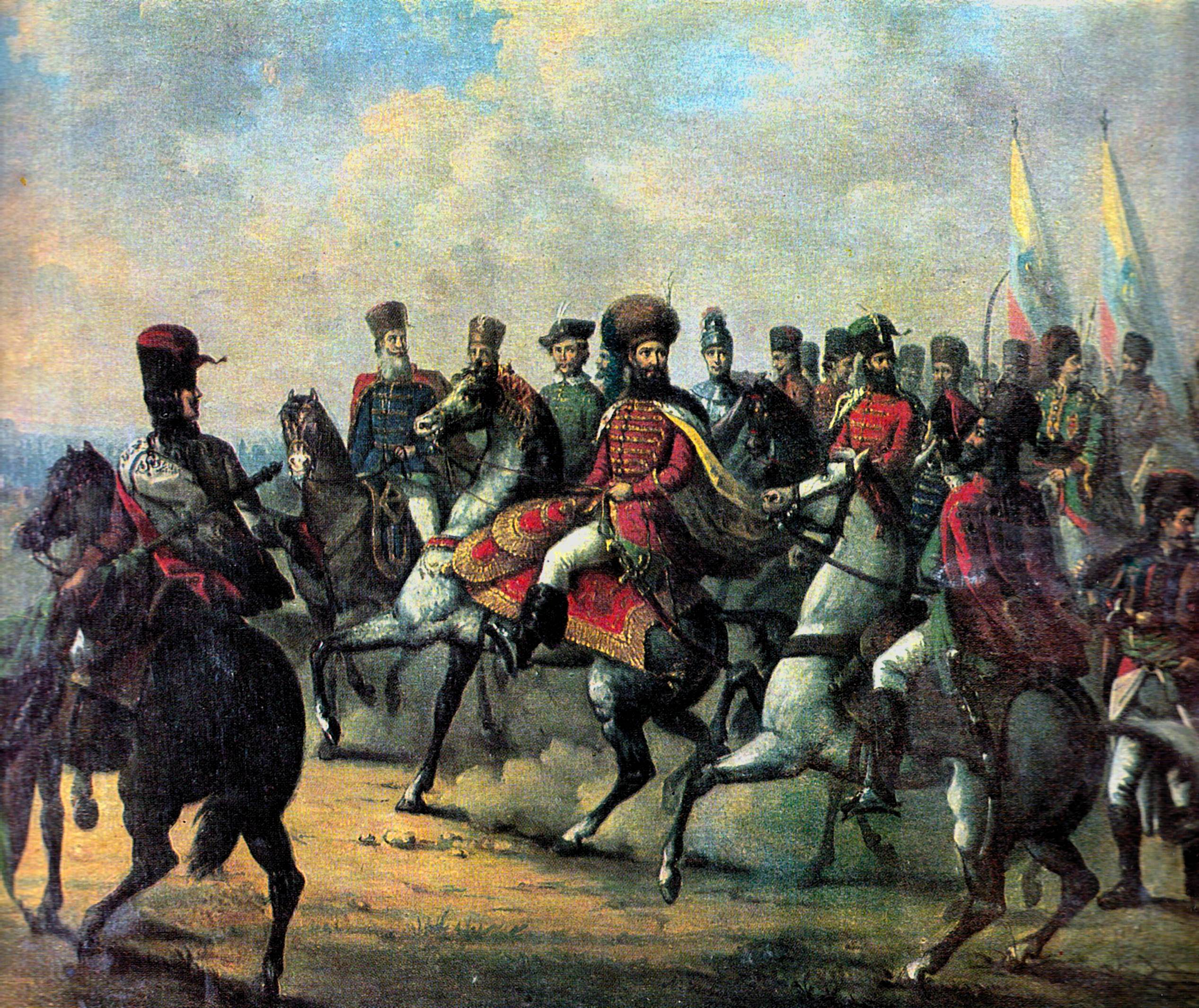
Michael the Brave and his troops, 19th-century painting by Nicolae Grigorescu

Samuil Micu, a member of the Transylvanian School wrote in his work Short Explanation of the History of the Romanians (written in the 1790s): "In the year 1593, Michael, who is called the Brave, succeeded to the lordship of Wallachia. He was a great warrior, who fought the Turks and defeated the Transylvanians. And he took Transylvania and gave it to Emperor Rudolf".

A. D. Xenopol firmly states the absence of any national element in Michael's politics, holding that Michael's lack of desire to join the principalities' administrations proved his actions were not motivated by any such concept.

However, Đorđe Branković (born 1645), a Transylvanian-born Serbian chronicler who long resided in Transylvania and Wallachia, stated in his Cronica românească ("Romanian chronicle") (Note: A name later given to the work due to it being written in Romanian unlike other works of his in which Serbian was used; the original title is unknown) that by ruling over Transylvania, Moldavia and Wallachia, Michael "expanded the power of the Romanian nation".

Several Romanian settlements named after him, such as:

- Mihai Viteazu, a commune in Cluj County
- Mihai Bravu, Giurgiu, a commune in Giurgiu County
- Mihai Bravu, Tulcea, a commune in Tulcea County
- Mihai Viteazu, a village in the commune Vlad Țepeș, Călărași
- Mihai Bravu, a village in the commune Victoria, Brăila
- Mihai Bravu, a village in the commune Roșiori, Bihor

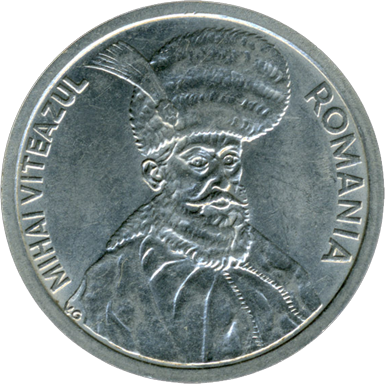
100 lei coin of Romania depicting Michael the Brave

Michael is also commemorated by the monks of the Athonite Simonopetra Monastery for his great contributions in the form of land and money to rebuilding the monastery that had been destroyed by a fire.

Mihai Viteazul, a film by Sergiu Nicolaescu, a well-known Romanian film director, is a representation of the life of the Wallachian ruler and his will to unite the three Romanian principalities (Wallachia, Moldavia, and Transylvania) as one domain.

The Order of Michael the Brave, Romania's highest military decoration, was named after Michael. Mihai Viteazul's name and portrait appear on at least two Romanian coins: 5 Lei 1991 (only 3 pieces of this type were minted and the coin was not entered into circulation), and on 100 Lei, which circulated through the 1990s.

At least four major high schools in Romania bear his name: the Mihai Viteazul National College (Bucharest) the Mihai Viteazul National College (Ploiești), the Mihai Viteazul National College (Slobozia) and Mihai Viteazul National College (Galați)

== Seal ==
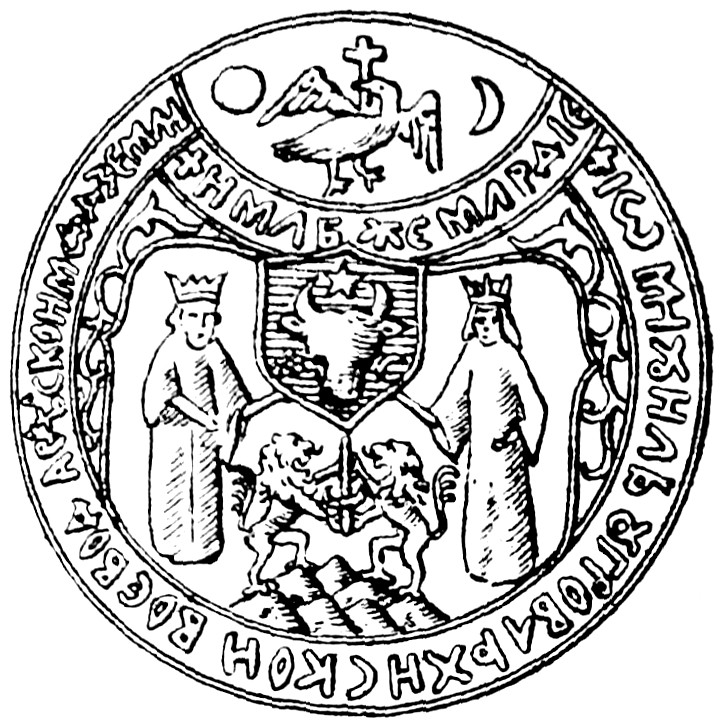
Seal of Michael the Brave during his personal union of Wallachia, Moldavia and Transylvania

The seal comprises the coats of arms of Moldavia, Wallachia, and Transylvania: in the middle, on a shield the Moldavian urus, above Wallachian eagle between sun and moon holding cross in beak, below Byzantine coat of arms, belonging to the Kantakouzenos – Asen branch of Asen dynasty: two meeting, standing lions supporting a sword, treading on seven mountains. The Moldavian shield is held by two crowned figures.

There are two inscriptions on the seal. First, circular, in Slavonic using Romanian Cyrillic alphabet "IO MIHAILI UGROVLAHISCOI VOEVOD ARDEALSCOI MOLD ZEMLI", meaning "Io Michael Wallachian Voivode of Transylvanian and Moldavian Lands". Second, placed along a circular arc separating the Wallachian coat from the rest of the heraldic composition, "I ML BJE MLRDIE", could be translated "Through The Very Grace of God".

== Bibliography ==
- Bolovan, Ioan; Kurt W. Treptow (1997). A History of Romania (3rd ed.). Iași: Center for Romanian Studies. ISBN 978-973-98091-0-8. OCLC 39225262.
- Djuvara, Neagu (2014). A Brief Illustrated History of Romanians. Humanitas. ISBN 978-973-50-4334-6.
- Giurescu, Constantin C. (2007) [1935]. Istoria Românilor (in Romanian). Bucharest: Editura All.
- Homutescu, Adrian. "Elements of Romanian Heraldry". Archived from the original on 23 March 2008.
- Ionașcu, Ion (1962). "Mihai Viteazul și autorii tratatului de la Alba Iulia (1595)". Anuarul Institutului de Istorie și Arheologie, Cluj-Napoca (in Romanian). 5: 111–144. ISSN 0253-1550. OCLC 20377434.
- Iorga, Nicolae (1904). Ștefan-cel-mare și Mihai-Viteazul: ca întemeietorii bisericii Românilor din Ardeal (PDF) (in Romanian). Bucharest: Minerva. OCLC 18153903. Archived from the original (PDF) on 9 April 2008.
- Iorga, Nicolae (1968). Istoria lui Mihai Viteazul (in Romanian). Bucharest: Editura Militară. OCLC 1243864.
- Jarausch, Konrad Hugo (2007). Conflicted Memories: Europeanizing Contemporary Histories. New York: Berghahn Books. OCLC 493876549.
- Manea, Cristina Anton (2003). "Structura și restructurarea marii boierimi din Țara Românească de la începutul secolului al XVI – LEA până la mijlocul" (in Romanian). Archived from the original (PhD. Thesis) on 8 February 2008.
- Panaitescu, Petre P. (1936). Mihai Viteazul (in Romanian). Bucharest: Fundația Regală. OCLC 29925825.
- Rezachevici, Constantin (November 1999). "Mihail Viteazul: Cele patru itinerarii transilvane". Magazin Istoric (in Romanian). ISSN 0541-881X. OCLC 2263749. Archived from the original on 10 October 2007.
- Rezachevici, Constantin (May 2000). "Mihail Viteazul: Itinerariul moldovean". Magazin Istoric (in Romanian). ISSN 0541-881X. OCLC 2263749. Archived from the original on 26 September 2007.
- Rezachevici, Constantin (October 2000). "Legenda și substratul ei istoric. Mihail Viteazul Restituror Daciae?". Magazin Istoric (in Romanian). ISSN 0541-881X. OCLC 2263749. Archived from the original on 22 December 2007.
- Szádeczky Kardoss, Lajos: Erdély és Mihály vajda története. [History of Transylvania in the time of vovoide Mihail with added documents]. Temesvár 1893. Második, bővitett kiadás. Erdély és Mihály vajda története, 1595–1601. oklevéltárral

Mihai I of Wallachia House of Basarab; Drăculești branch Died: 1601 9 August
Regnal titles
Preceded by Alexandru cel Rău	Prince of Wallachia; 1593–1600	Succeeded by Simion Movilă
Preceded by Ieremia Movilă	Prince of Moldavia; 1600	Succeeded by Ieremia Movilă
Notes and references
1. Regnal Chronologies
