= Battle of Bucov =

- Part of the Moldavian Magnate Wars
| Date | 20 October 1600 |
| Location | Bucov, in modern Prahova County, Romania |
| Result | Polish–Lithuanian–Moldavian victory |

Belligerents
| Polish-Lithuanian Commonwealth; Moldavia | Wallachia |

Commanders and leaders
| Jan Zamoyski; Stanisław Żółkiewski; Marek Sobieski; Ieremia Movilă | Michael the Brave; Baba Novac |

Strength
| 15,000–17,000; 10 artillery pieces | 15,000–16,000 |

Casualties and losses
| Very light | 1,000 killed 95 banners captured |

The Battle of Bucov or Teleajen River (called battle of Bukowo in Polish historiography) was fought during the Moldavian Magnate Wars between the Polish–Lithuanian Commonwealth and the Principality of Wallachia, on October 20, 1600. Polish-Lithuanian forces under the command of Jan Zamoyski and Moldavian army of Ieremia Movilă defeated the Wallachian forces commanded by Michael the Brave.

The battle, which took place in Bucov (in modern-day Prahova County) was fierce, and lasted several hours. After having sustained heavy losses, Michael the Brave retreated towards Craiova, with the hope of organizing a more efficient resistance.
