= Battle of Guruslău =

Battle during Long Turkish War

- Part of the Long War (Ottoman wars)
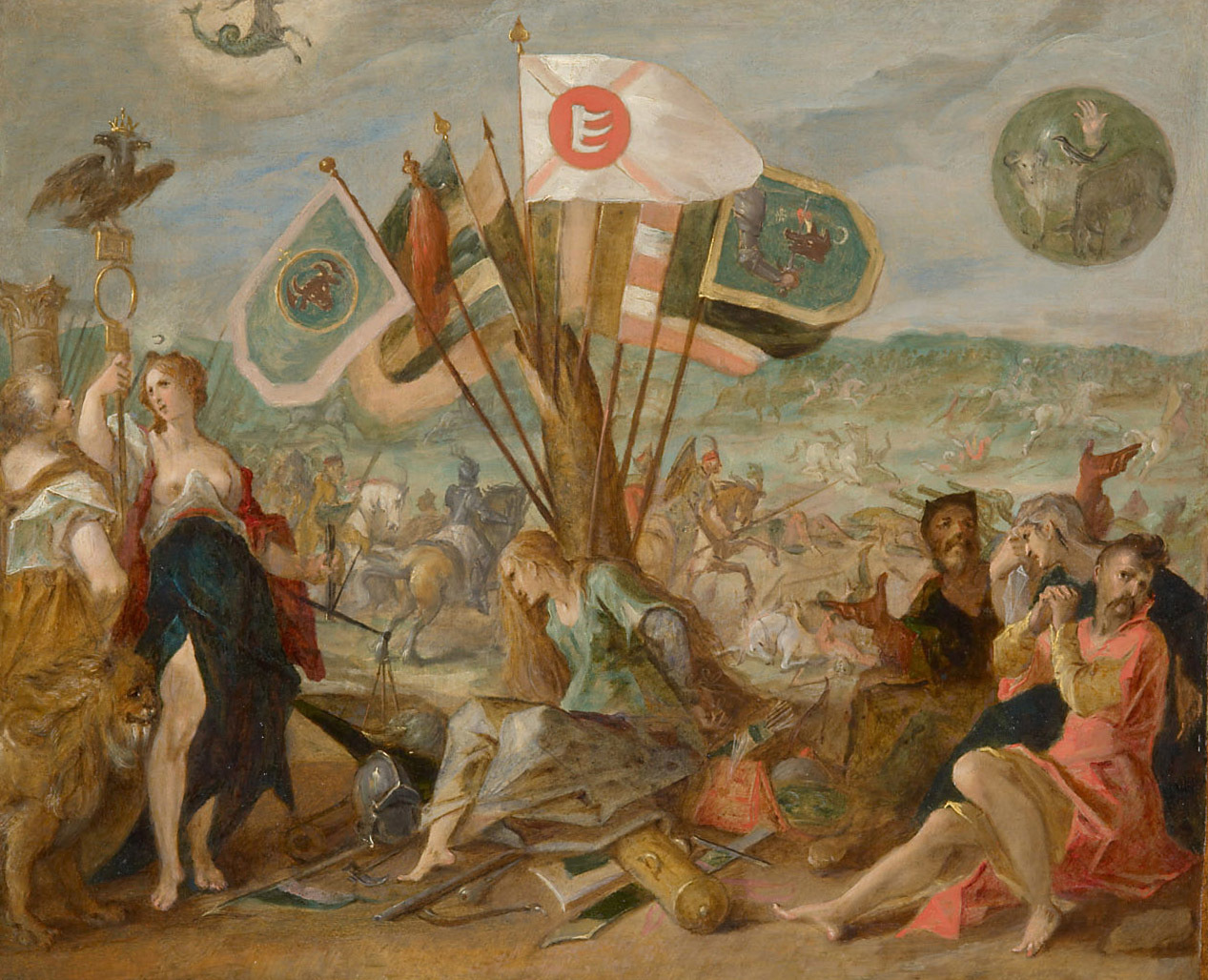
- Center: Discordia, holding some of the 110 flags captured by Michael and Basta (left: Moldavia, right: Odorhei, center: Báthory's flag). Right: Transylvanian prisoners sitting under a round shield with Transylvanian symbols: a hand, a bird, a donkey, a sheep. Left: Diana, holding a spear with the imperial twin-headed eagle, under the Capricorn, Emperor Rudolph II's astrological sign. By Hans von Aachen, 1603–1604
Date	3 August 1601
Location	Goroszló, Principality of Transylvania (today Guruslău, as part of Hereclean, Romania) 47°15′N 23°01′E
Result	Wallachian–Austrian victory
Territorial changes	Transylvania is taken out from Ottoman suzerainty

Belligerents
Wallachia; Habsburg Monarchy; Zaporozhian Cossacks	Transylvania; Moldavia

Commanders and leaders
Michael the Brave; Giorgio Basta	(Transylvania) Sigismund Báthory

Strength
20,000	40,000; 45 cannons

Casualties and losses
Unknown	10,000–11,000 casualties All or 40 cannons captured 150 flags captured

The Battle of Guruslău or Battle of Goroszló (Hungarian: goroszlói csata; Romanian: Bătălia de la Guruslău) was fought on 3 August 1601, between the troops of the Habsburg monarchy led by Giorgio Basta, the Zaporozhian Cossacks and Wallachia led by Michael the Brave on one side, and the Transylvanian troops led by Sigismund Báthory on the other side. It was part of a series of military encounters between the Ottoman Empire and opposing European states during 1591–1606 (see also The Long War).

== Background ==
Michael asked for assistance from Emperor Rudolf II during a visit in Prague between 23 February and 5 March 1601. The visit was granted when the emperor heard that General Giorgio Basta had lost control of Transylvania to the Transylvanian Hungarian nobility led by Sigismund Báthory, who accepted Ottoman protection. Meanwhile, Wallachian forces loyal to Michael and led by his son, Nicolae Pătrașcu, drove out Simion Movilă from Moldavia and prepared to re-enter Transylvania.

== Battle ==
The battle was carried out by two armies, those of Michael the Brave (Wallachians and Cossacks) together with Giorgio Basta, on one side and those of Sigismund Báthory on the other side. The battle happened between 9 am and 7 pm on 3 August 1601. The Battle of Guruslău took place in the plain of the river Guruslău, a small right tributary of the Zalău.

== Legacy ==
A monument was built to commemorate the victory of Michael the Brave.

== Gallery ==
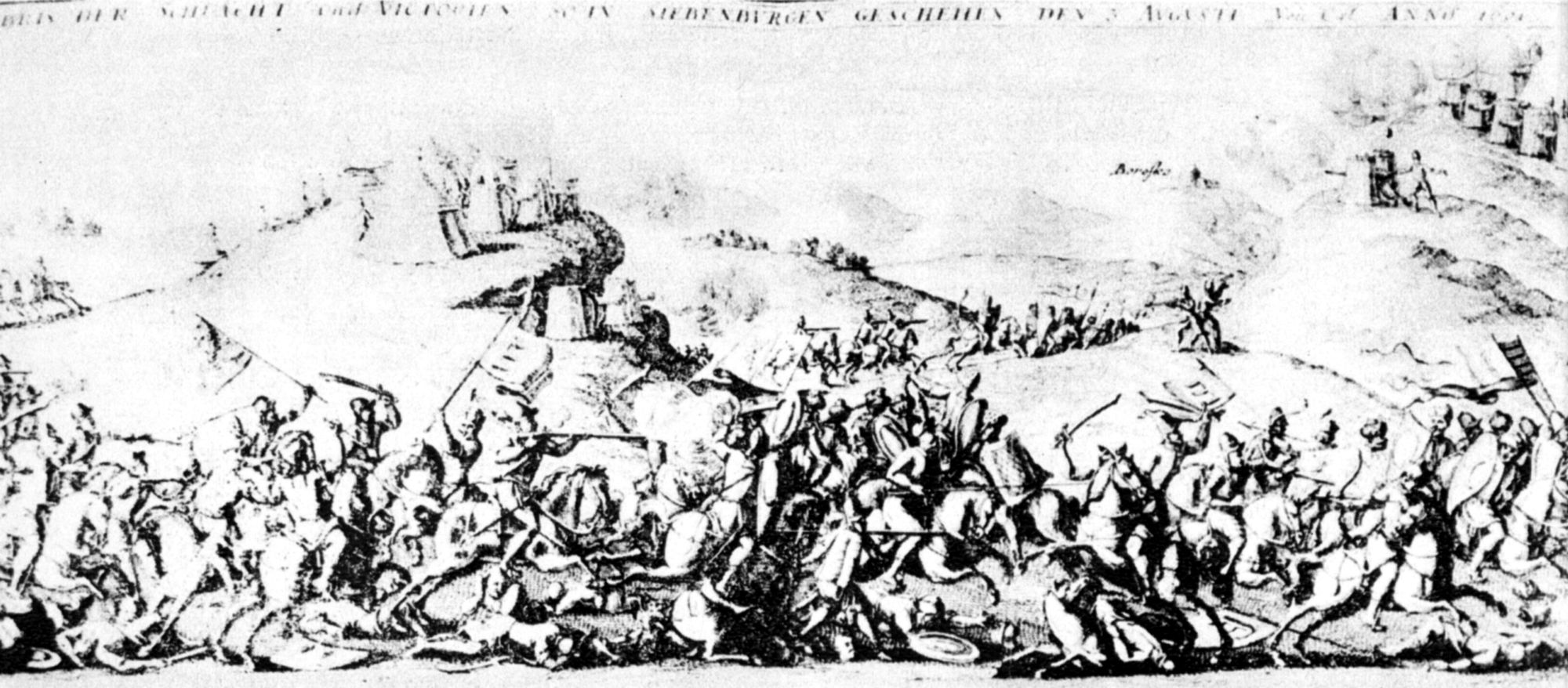

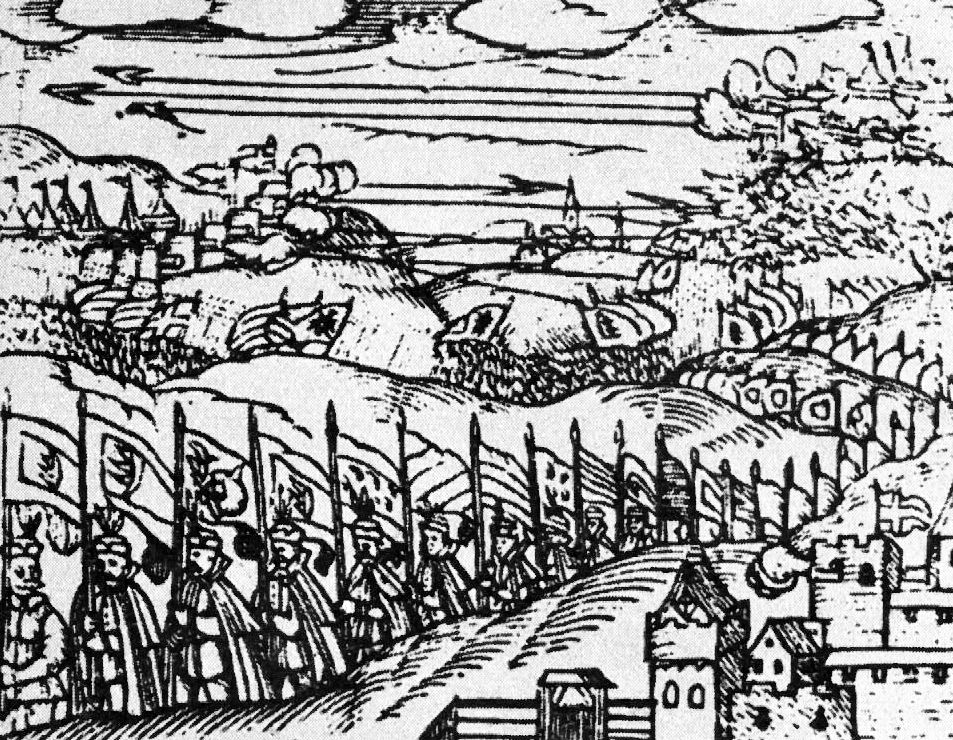
Michael and Basta defeating the Hungarian nobility of Transylvania

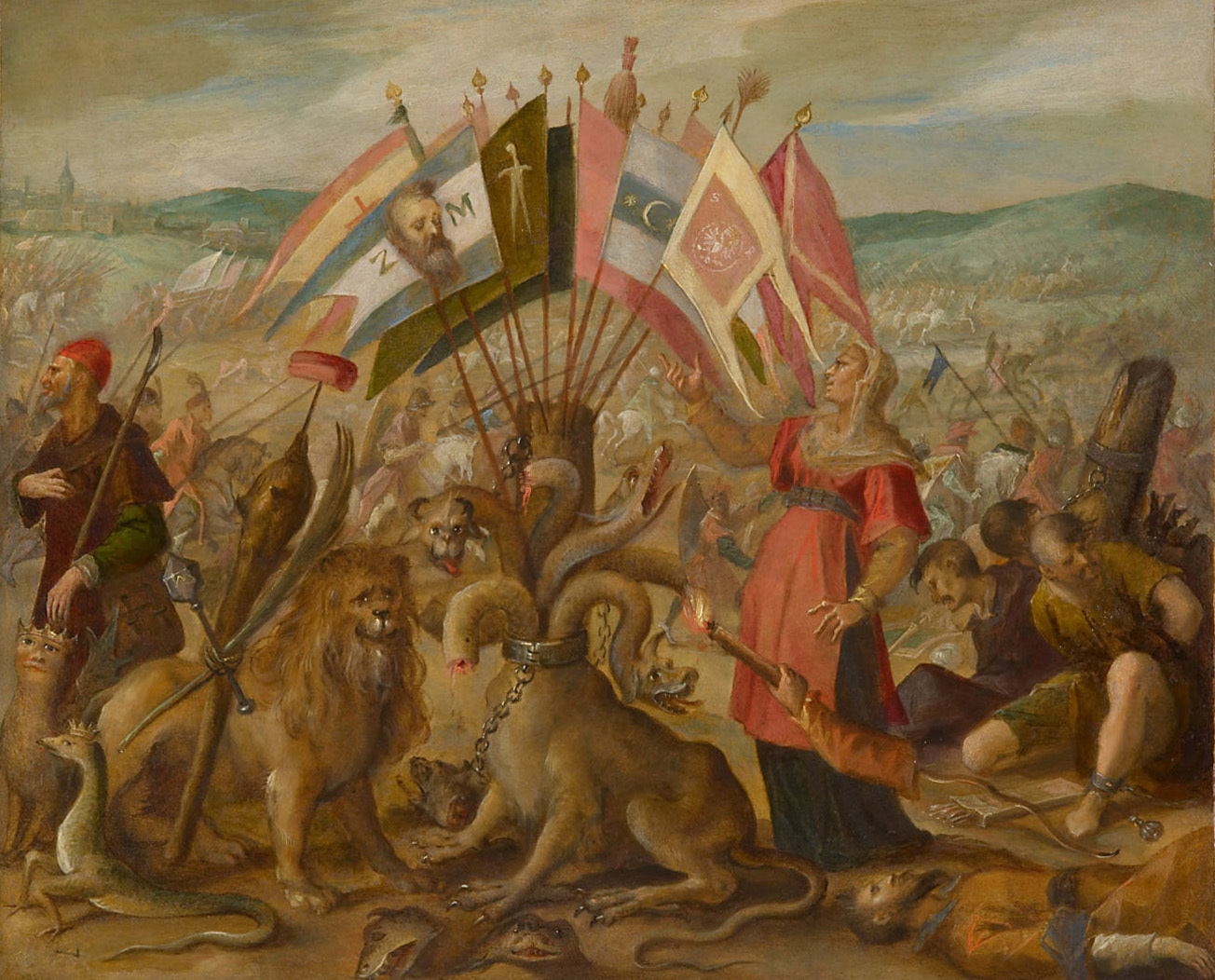
Battle of Braşov (1603) (painted by Hans von Aachen)
