= Paul van Somer I =

Flemish-English painter (c. 1577–1621)

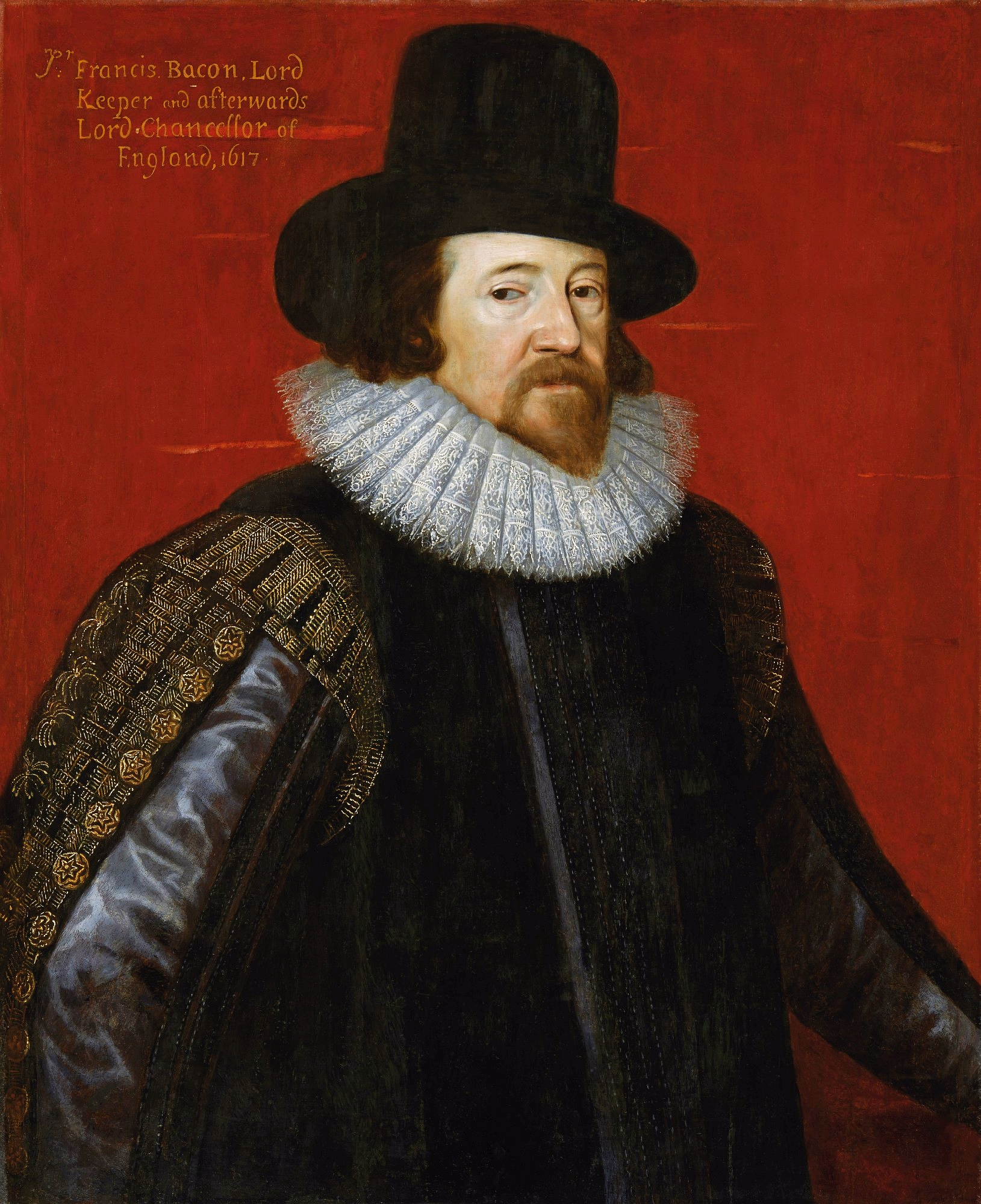
Sir Francis Bacon by Paul van Somer I (1617), Palace on the Isle in Warsaw.

Paul van Somer (c. 1577 – 1621), also known as Paulus van Somer, was a Flemish artist who arrived in England from Antwerp during the reign of King James I of England and became one of the leading painters of the royal court. He painted a number of portraits both of James and his consort, Queen Anne of Denmark, and of nobles such as Ludovic Stewart, 2nd Duke of Lennox, Elizabeth Hastings, Countess of Huntingdon, and Lady Anne Clifford. He is sometimes designated as "Paul van Somer I" to distinguish him from the engraver of the same name who was active in England between 1670 and 1694.

== Life and career ==
Paul van Somer is in some ways an elusive figure: not much is known about him, and his art is rarely written about;. According to Karel van Mander, he was the brother of Barend van Someren, who married and brought back the daughter of Aert Mijtens after he returned from Italy. Van Mander does not mention whether Paul had accompanied his brother to Italy or not, and only remarked that he was still a bachelor. According to the Netherlands Institute for Art History, van Somer lived between 1612 and 1614 in the house of Steven de Gheyn in Leiden, during 1616 in Brussels, and after that moved to London, where he became court painter. He occupied an important position as one of James and Anne's favourite painters and can be seen as a forerunner of the more famous Flemish and Dutch artists, in particular Daniel Mytens and Anthony van Dyck, who followed in his footsteps as leading court painters. (In fact, one of van Dyck's first tasks was to copy van Somer's royal portraits, a duty he did not enjoy.) Van Somer arrived in England as a mature artist, having travelled widely in northern Europe: Booth Tarkington names the year of his arrival as 1606, but H.L.Meakin notes that he did not settle permanently in the country until after 1616.

Van Somer received additional commissions from non-royal sources. Francis Manners, 6th Earl of Rutland paid him £26 for portraits in 1618, and £37 for pictures of King James and Prince Charles in 1619. Lady Anne Clifford refers in her diary to being painted by him on 30 August 1619. A curiosity of van Somer's oeuvre is his portrait of Elizabeth Drury (1596–1610), a girl made famous by John Donne's poems on her death, such as "An Anatomy of the World". Van Somer may have painted the portrait several years after Elizabeth's death, or possibly during her visit to the continent with her parents shortly before she died. The portrait is noteworthy in that the subject is depicted in a semi-recumbent position—unusual for a non-nude of the period— which may, as H.L.Meakin points out, be intended as a sign of a philosophical or melancholy character, as in Nicholas Hilliard's portrait of Henry Percy, 9th Earl of Northumberland. Other portraits include those of Lady Elizabeth Grey, Countess of Kent, painted in about 1619, and a portrait of Ludovic Stewart, 2nd Duke of Lennox.

== Collections and analysis ==
Van Somer's achievement is described in the gallery notes at the Royal Collection as follows: "Like Daniel Mytens, who had settled in London from the Netherlands by 1618 and was Van Somer’s neighbour in St Martin’s Lane, Van Somer brought a new grandeur, fluency and naturalism to British court portraiture." Opinion of van Somer's work has, however, been divided: Horace Walpole thought one of his portraits as fine as a Van Dyck, and Booth Tarkington, in his psychological study King James in Faded Paint suggested that "Paulus van Somer had gifts and one of them was for the perception of character"; on the other hand, art critic Sir John Rothenstein condemned van Somer's work as dull and heavy.

Copies of van Somer's royal portraits were often commissioned, particularly as James disliked sitting for painters, to be sent as gifts overseas. Many variants also exist in printed form. Van Somer is said to have introduced regalia into royal portraiture, for example that of the Order of the Garter. The ambassador in Brussels, William Trumbull, sent measurements for portraits to Van Somer. He replied in December 1618, via Edward Norgate, that the suggested sizes were too narrow. A standard full length portrait of usual proportions would cost £30 or £25.

Some of van Somer's work can still be seen today. He completed a much-reproduced portrait of James I in 1616 and one of Queen Anne in hunting attire with her African servant, horse, and hunting dogs, in the grounds of Oatlands Palace, a year later. Van Somer had by then become Anne's favourite painter, supplanting John de Critz and Marcus Gheeraerts the Younger. Another portrait of Anne of Denmark, at Drumlanrig Castle, includes several jewels, a diamond crossbow in her hair, with diamond badges of "S" and "C4" referring to her family, and a centrally placed cross or aigrette which may be the jewel known as the "Mirror of France". When she died in 1619 she owed him £170, and he joined her funeral procession as her "picture maker" with the artists Marcus Gheeraerts and Peter Oliver.
