= Monument to Michael the Brave, Guruslău =

Heritage site in Sălaj County, Romania

Monument to Michael the Brave
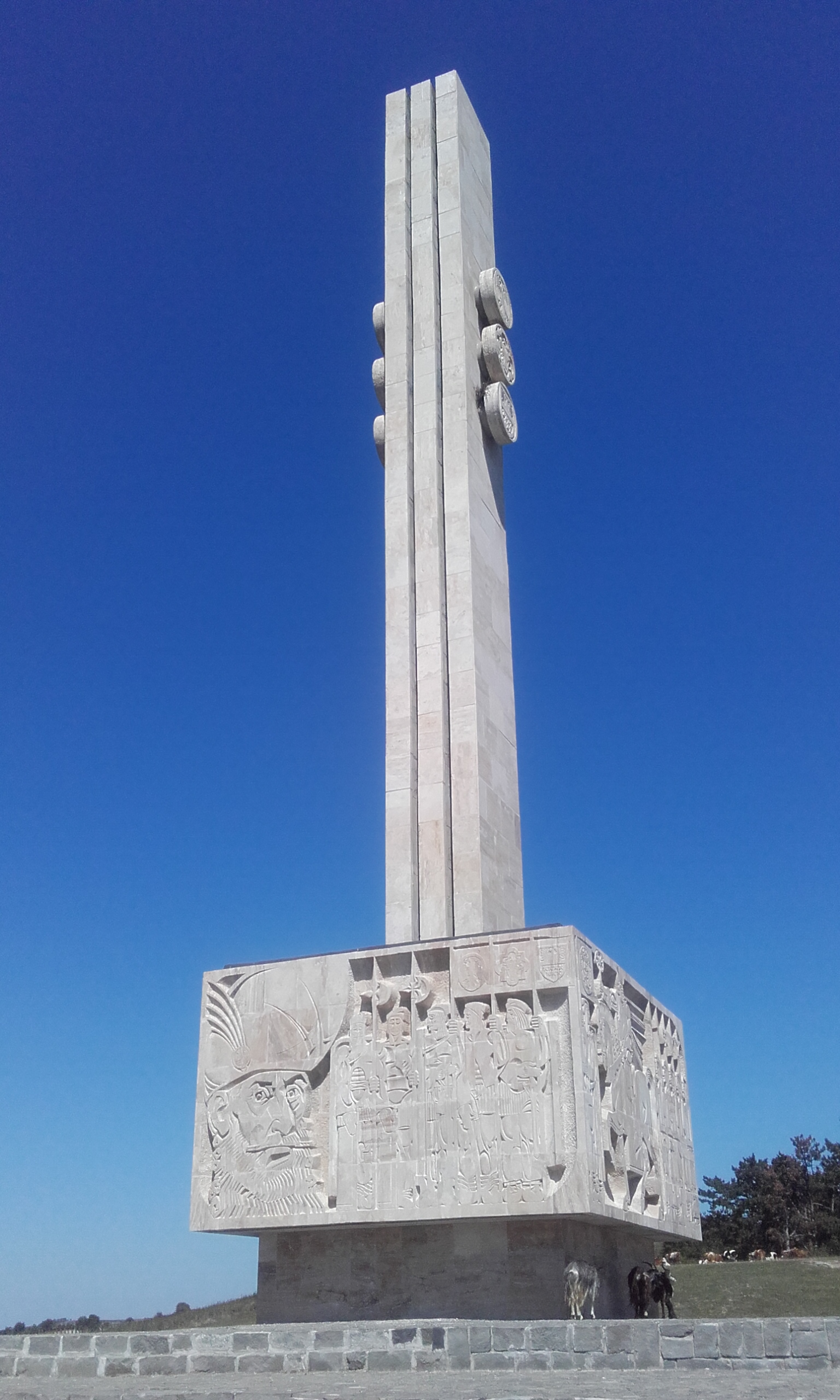
- Monument to Michael the Brave at Guruslău in 2016
- Location: Guruslău
- Designer: Victor Gaga
- Opening date: 1976
- Dedicated to: the victory of Michael the Brave in the Battle of Guruslău (Goroszló) (today , Sălaj, Romania).

The Monument to Michael the Brave is a monument to the victory of Michael the Brave in the Battle of Guruslău (Goroszló). It is located in Guruslău, Sălaj, Romania.
