= Barend van Someren =

Flemish painter and printmaker (1572–1632)

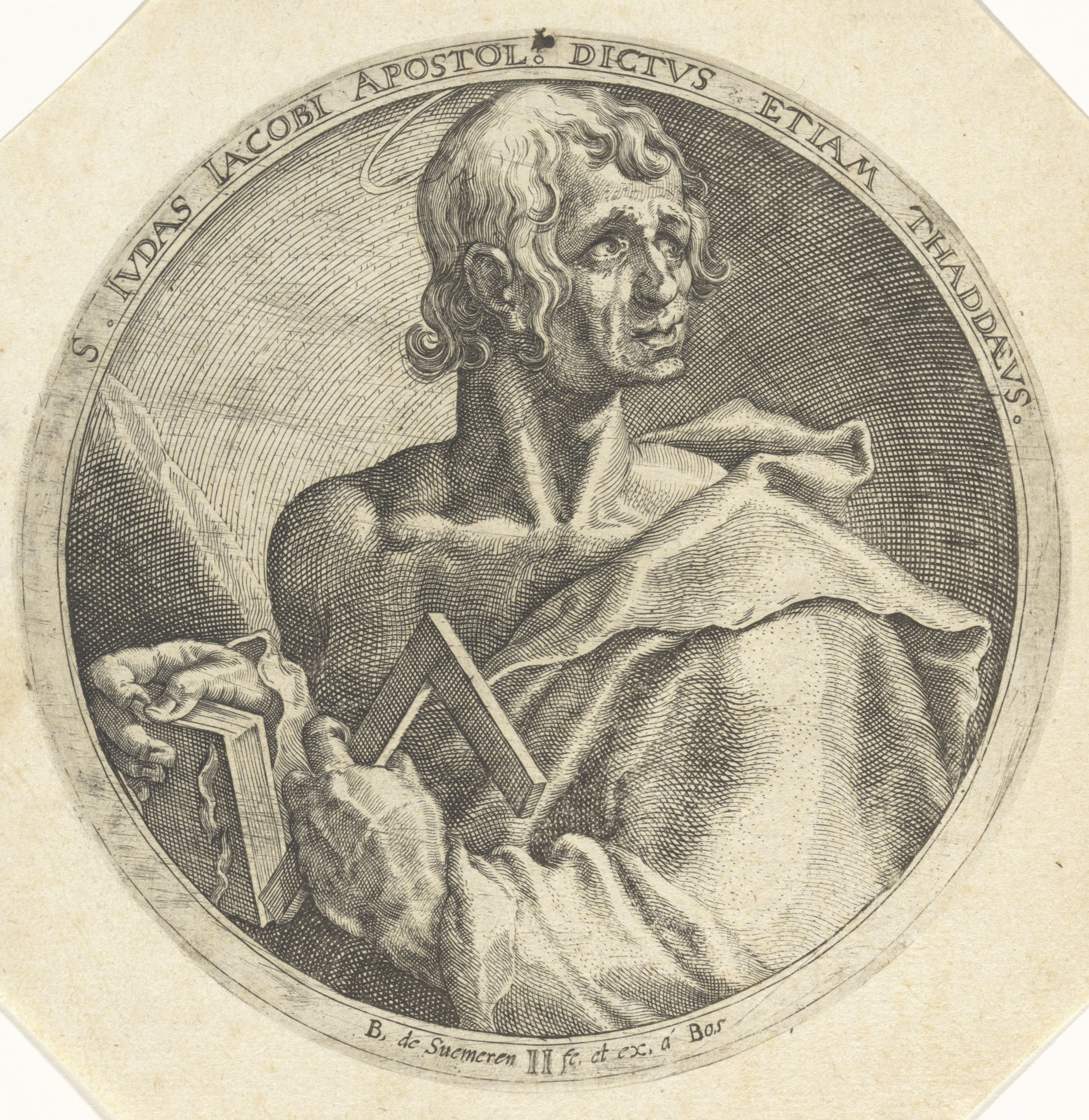
Judas Taddeüs

Barend van Someren (1572–1632) was a Flemish painter and printmaker who after training and working in Antwerp, worked a few years in Rome and finally took up residence in Amsterdam in the Dutch Republic. He is reported to have painted history and landscape paintings but no known paintings by him have been identified. He was also active as an art dealer, publisher and innkeeper.

== Life ==
Van Someren was born in Antwerp. He was the brother of Paul van Somer I. He trained in his hometown with Filips Lisaert the Younger. He traveled to Rome in 1600 where he resided until 1602. In Rome he worked in the workshop of Aert Mijtens. He married Mijtens' daughter Dianora. He left Rome for Amsterdam in 1602.

Van Someren operated an inn in Amsterdam. The Flemish painter Adriaen Brouwer stayed in this inn when he first arrived in the Dutch Republic in 1625.

His pupils were his son Hendrick, Daniël van den Bremden, and Willem Cornelisz Duyster. Van Someren died in Amsterdam.

== Work ==
No extant paintings by him are known. He is reported to have painted history and landscape paintings. A few prints by his hand are portraits of religious and historical figures such as the Judas Taddeüs.
