= Anthonie van Santvoort =

Flemish painter (c.1552–1600)

Anthony Van Santvoort (or Anthonie Van Santvoort) (ca.1552 Mechelen - October 11, 1600 Rome) was a Flemish painter; publisher of prints and art broker.

Described as an "obscure" Flemish painter.

He married an Italian woman from Rome.

Hans von Aachen belonged to the circle of artists in Rome who frequented Anthony van Santvoort.

A document from April 1575 reports that the artist Hans Speckaert was paralyzed. "This may have been the result of an accident while working on an unknown church early in the year 1575, together with the artist Anthonie van Santvoort."

There was a dispute with the Painter's Guild over Hans Speckaert having worked in a church in Rome with his friend Anthony Van Santvoort without its authorization.

He was knicknaned "the green Anthony".
