= Hans Speckaert =

Flemish painter (1540–1577)

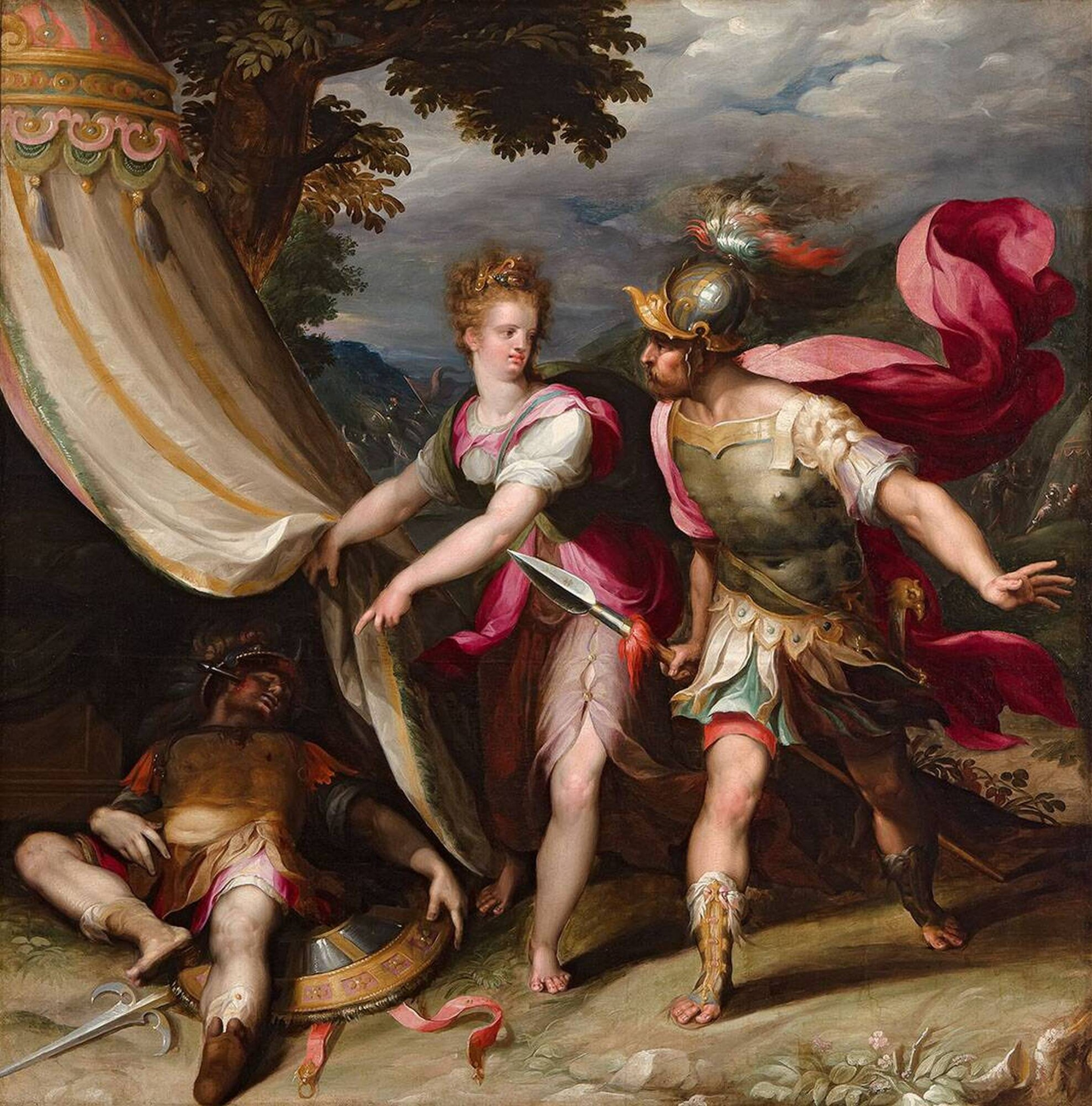
Jaël and Sisera

Hans Speckaert (c. 1540 – c. 1577) was a Flemish Renaissance painter who was active in Italy. He is known for his portraits, history paintings and his many drawings. The artist was one of the earliest representatives of Northern Mannerism. His fluid and elegant drawing style exerted an important influence on contemporary Northern artists.

== Life ==
Details about the life of the artist are scarce. According to the early Flemish painter and artist biographer Karel van Mander Speckaert was the son of an embroiderer in Brussels and a friend of the painter Aert Mijtens. He may have received his training in the Brussels workshop of Pieter de Kempeneer who was known as Pedro Campaña (1503-1580).

He travelled to Italy at an unknown date and is believed to have arrived in Rome sometime in 1566. Van Mander visited Italy during the period that Speckaert was there. In Rome, Speckaert joined a group of Northern painters working in Rome in the 16th century. He made a close study of the art of the great Italian Renaissance masters Michelangelo, Raphael, and others. A document from April 1575 reports that the artist had been paralyzed. Possibly this was the result of an accident which had occurred while he was working at an unknown church early in the year 1575, together with the artist Anthonie van Santvoort.

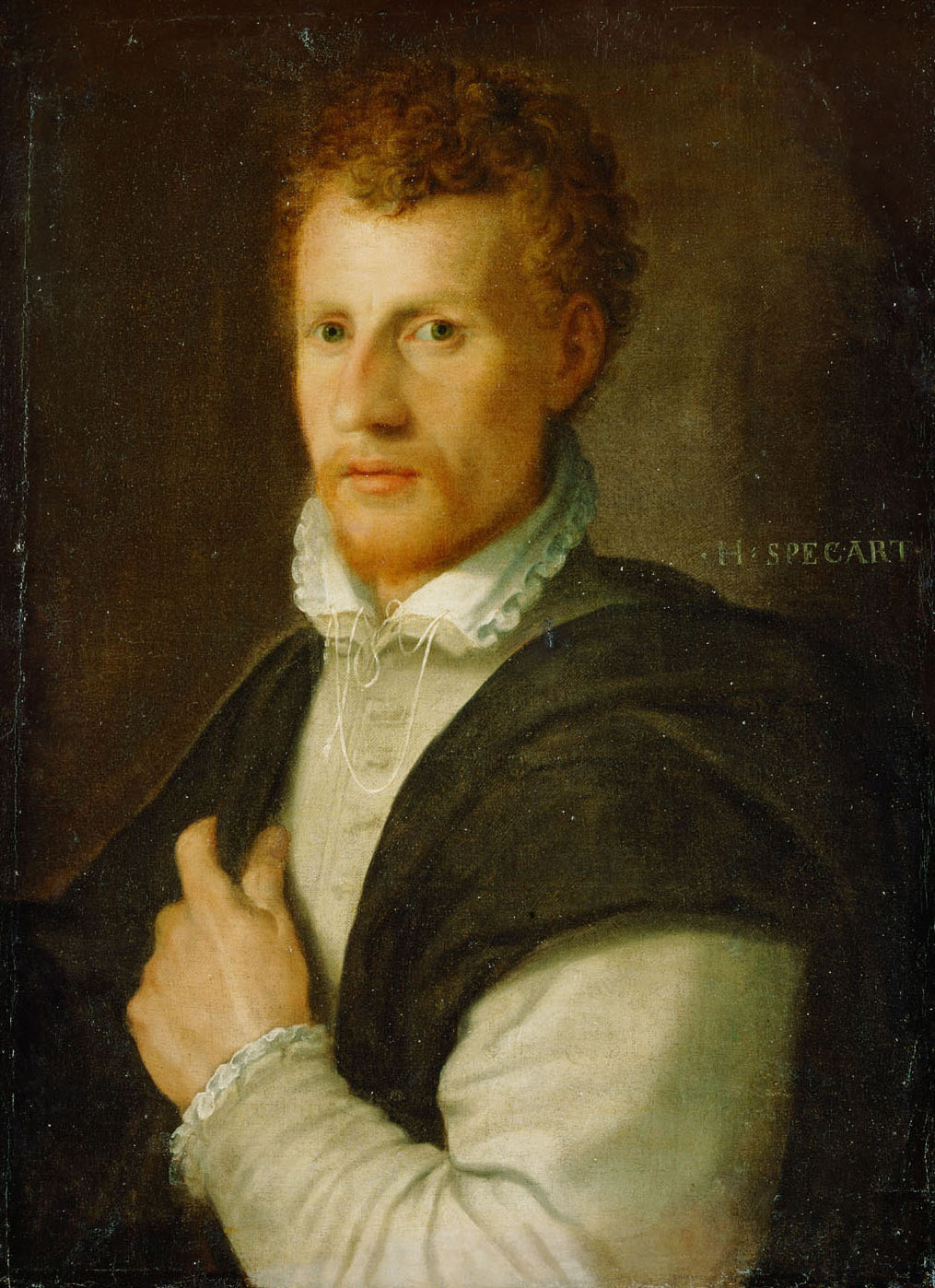
Portrait of Cornelis Cort

There was a dispute with the Painter's Guild over Hans Speckaert having worked in a church in Rome with his friend Anthonie van Santvoort without its authorization.

After a long period in Rome, Speckaert attempted to return to the Netherlands and got as far as Florence, but feeling unwell, he turned back to Rome, where he died. His death likely occurred around 1577.

== Work ==
Hans Speckaert is known for his portraits, history paintings and his many drawings. Only four paintings have been attributed with certainty to the artist, including the portrait of the engraver Cornelis Cort (Kunsthistorisches Museum), who was a close friend. The other known paintings include Moses and the Brazen Serpent (Museo Nacional de Bellas Artes, Buenos Aires), Diana and Actaeon (Palazzo Patrizi, Rome) and The Conversion of St Paul (Louvre, Paris). He made designs for prints that were executed by Cornelis Cort en Aegidius Sadeler and form the basis for further attributions. His oeuvre is not yet clearly defined, since the attribution of drawings is hampered by the fact that the artist's work was widely imitated.

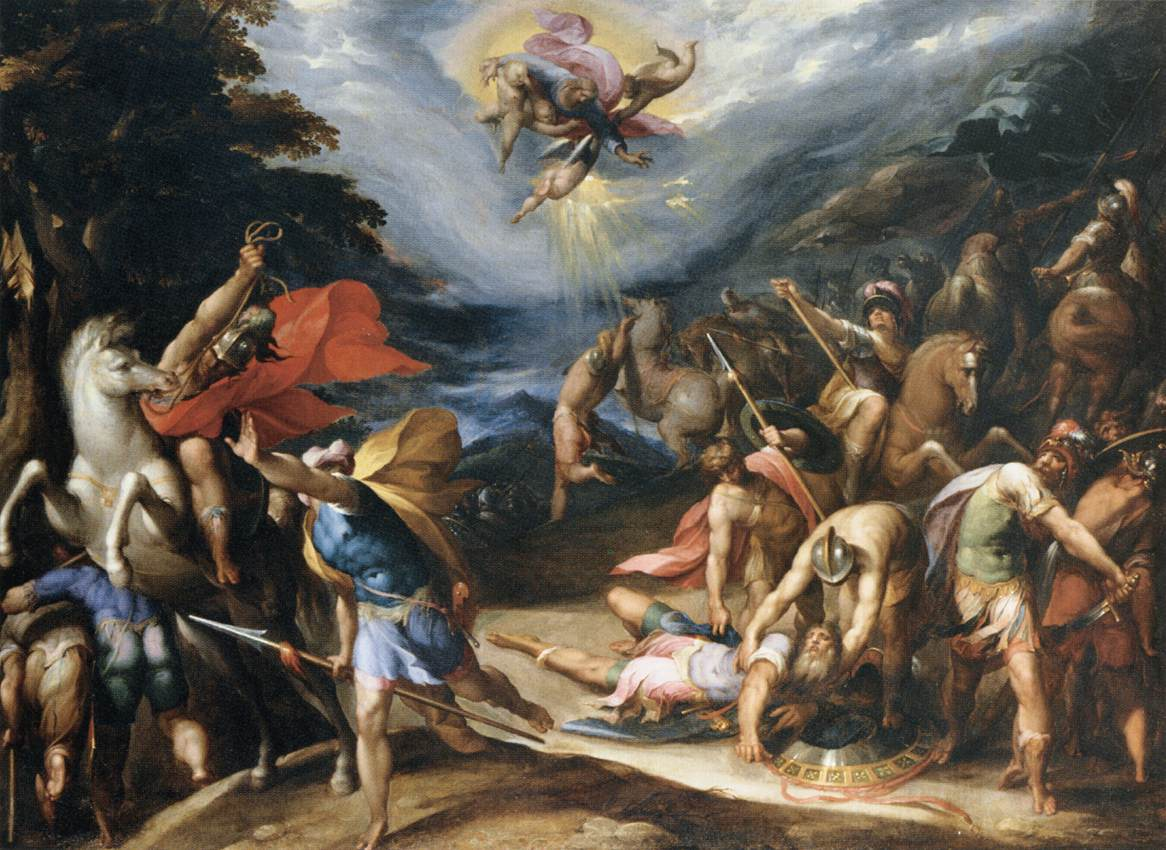
The Conversion of St Paul

His close study of the art of the Italian Renaissance masters informs the muscular, monumental figures in his work. In his Jaël and Sisera (Museum Boijmans Van Beuningen) the short perspective of the deceased Sisera shows the Mannerist preoccupation with the depiction of the human body. The emphatic, somewhat theatrical, postures of Jael and her companion Barak are characteristic of his Mannerism. The work of Jacopo Bertoja, which was close to that of Parmigianino, was influential on his style.

Speckaert's fluid and elegant drawing style exerted an important influence on his Northern contemporaries, as is witnessed, in particular, in the drawings of Bartholomeus Spranger, Jan Soens, Hans von Aachen, Joseph Heintz the Elder and Karel van Mander. This was made possible because Speckaert's friend Anthonie van Santvoort, who managed his estate after his death and inherited his drawings via Cornelis Cort, who died a year after Speckaert, opened his house to artists who visited Rome so that they could study Speckaert's drawings.

Speckaert's designs were used as models for prints by Aegidius Sadeler, Cornelis Cort, Pedro Perret and Jan Harmensz. Muller.
