= Allegory of Peace, Art and Abundance =

Painting by Hans von Aachen

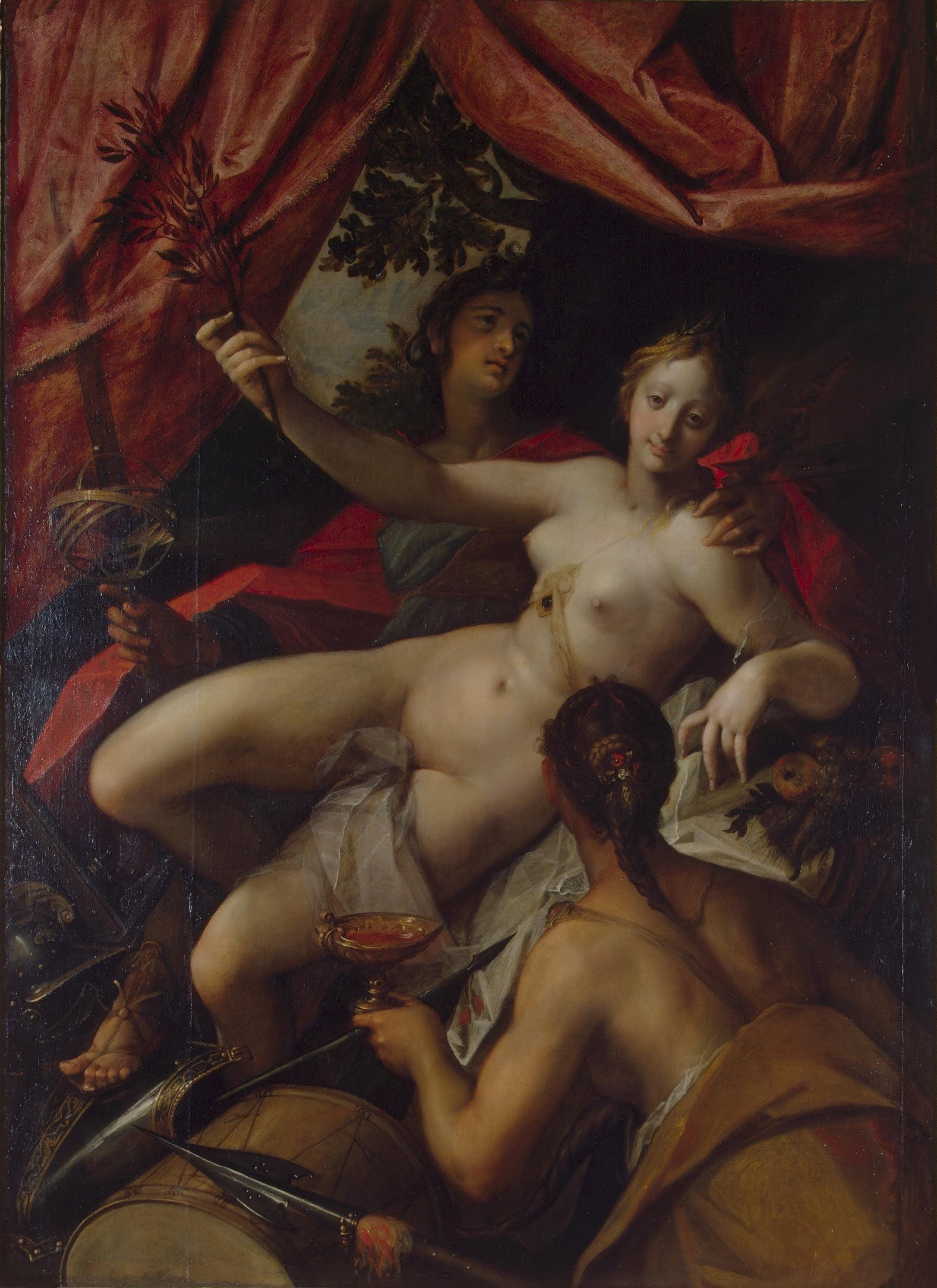
- Artist: Hans von Aachen
- Year: 1602
- Medium: Oil on canvas
- Dimensions: 197 mm × 142 mm (7.8 in × 5.6 in)
- Location: Hermitage Museum, Saint Petersburg

The Allegory of Peace, Art and Abundance (German: Allegorie des Friedens, der Kunst und des Überflusses) is a painting of 1602 by the German artist Hans von Aachen. It emerged from the artistic school that developed in the court of the Holy Roman Emperor Rudolf II. The three female figures are personifications of Peace (with an olive branch), Science and the Liberal Arts (with a sphere and a palette), and Abundance (with a goblet and a cornucopia), all of which are implied to have flourished under the emperor's policies. The work entered the Hermitage's collection in 1925, coming from the Gatchina Palace.
