= Greek-Catholic Church in Badon =

Church building in Badon, Romania

Coordinates: 47°15′N 22°58′E

Religion
- Affiliation: Romanian Greek-Catholic Church

Location
- Municipality: Badon, Sălaj
- Interactive map of Greek-Catholic Church in Badon

Architecture
- Completed: 18th century

The Greek-Catholic Church in Badon was a church in Badon, Sălaj, Romania built in the 18th century and demolished on April 5, 2007.
