= Hereclean =

Hereclean Haraklány
- Commune
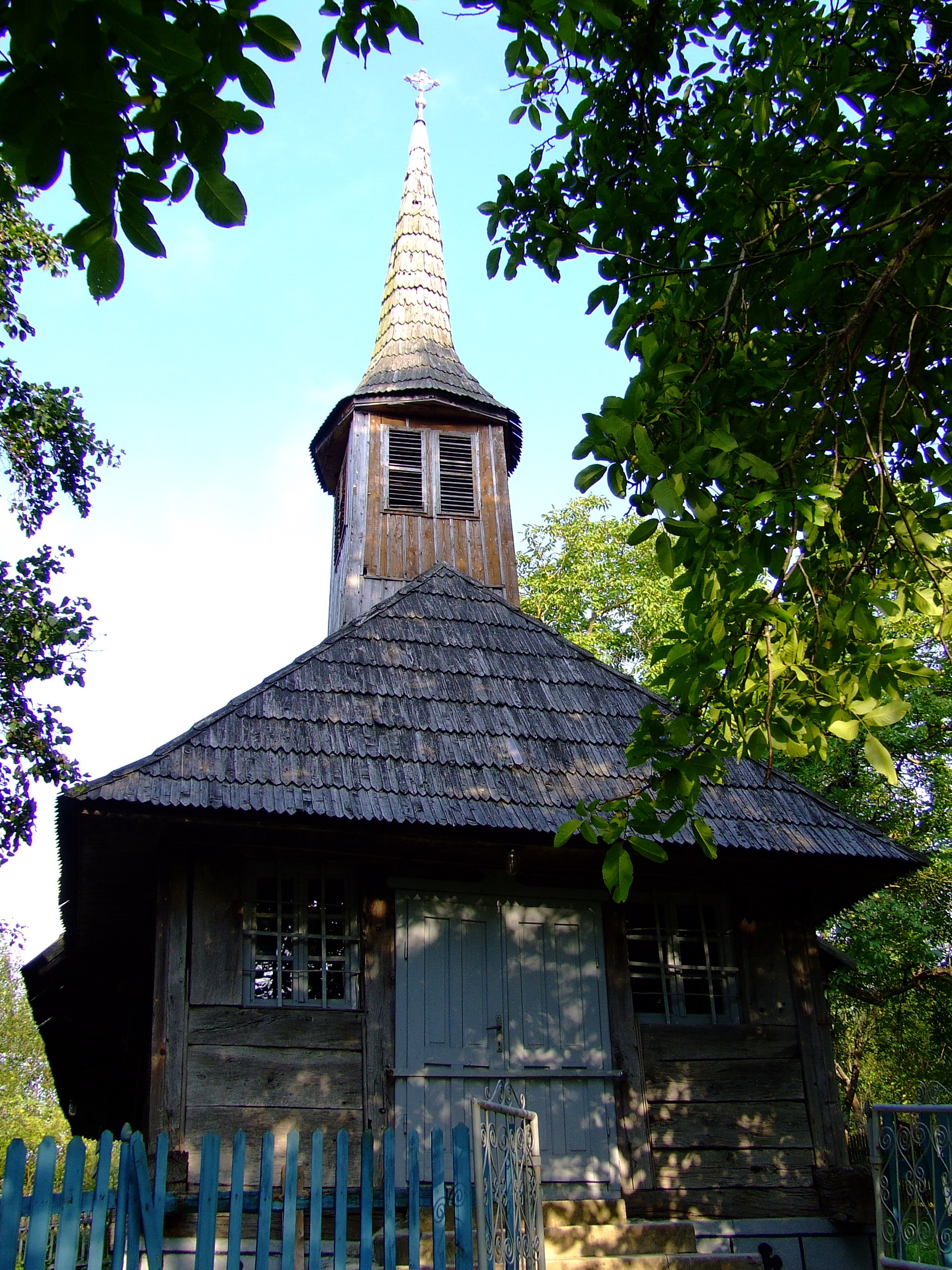
- Wooden church in Bocșița

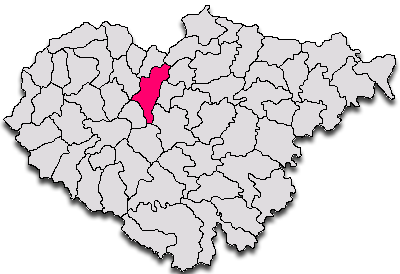
- Location in Sălaj County

- Location in Romania
- Coordinates: 47°14′30″N 22°59′30″E
- Country: Romania
- County: Sălaj

Government
  - Mayor (2020–2024): Francisc Dobrai (UDMR)
- Area: 71.63 km^{2} (27.66 sq mi)
- Elevation: 665 m (2,182 ft)
- Population (2021-12-01): 3,941
  - Density: 55.02/km^{2} (142.5/sq mi)
- Time zone: UTC+02:00 (EET)
  - Summer (DST): UTC+03:00 (EEST)
- Postal code: 457165
- Area code: +(40) 0260
- Vehicle reg.: SJ
- Website: primariahereclean.ro

Hereclean (Hungarian: Haraklány) is a commune located in Sălaj County, Crișana, Romania. It is composed of six villages: Badon (Bádon), Bocșița (Magyarbaksa), Dioșod (Diósad), Guruslău (Magyargoroszló), Hereclean, and Panic (Szilágypanit).

== Sights ==
- Wooden Church in Bocșița, built in the 17th century (1625), historic monument
- Reformed Church in Guruslău, completed in 1835
- Guruslău, Monument Mihai Viteazul, built in the 20th century (1976), historic monument
- Stejărișul Panic Nature reserve (2 ha (4.9 acres))
- Stejărișul de baltă Panic Nature reserve (1.7 ha (4.2 acres))

== Politics ==
Vasile Păcală was elected as the mayor in 2000 and 2004. Mayor Francisc Dobrai (born 1968, Dioșod) was elected the first time in 2008 as a member of the Democratic Alliance of Hungarians in Romania and re-elected in 2012. Before 2008, Dobrai had served as a local councilor for eight years.

=== 2012 election ===
The Hereclean Council, elected in the 2012 local government elections, is made up of 13 councilors, with the following party composition: 7-Democratic Alliance of Hungarians in Romania, 4-Social Liberal Union, 1-Democratic Liberal Party, 1-Hungarian Civic Party

Party	Seats	2012 Hereclean Council
Democratic Alliance of Hungarians in Romania	7	
Social Liberal Union	4	
Democratic Liberal Party	1	
Hungarian Civic Party	1	

=== 2008 election ===
The Hereclean Council, elected in the 2008 local government elections, is made up of 13 councilors, with the following party composition:

Party	Seats	2008 Hereclean Council
Democratic Alliance of Hungarians in Romania	6	
Democratic Party	2	
Social Democratic Party	2	
National Liberal Party	1	
Conservative Party	1	
Hungarian Civic Party	1	

== Gallery ==
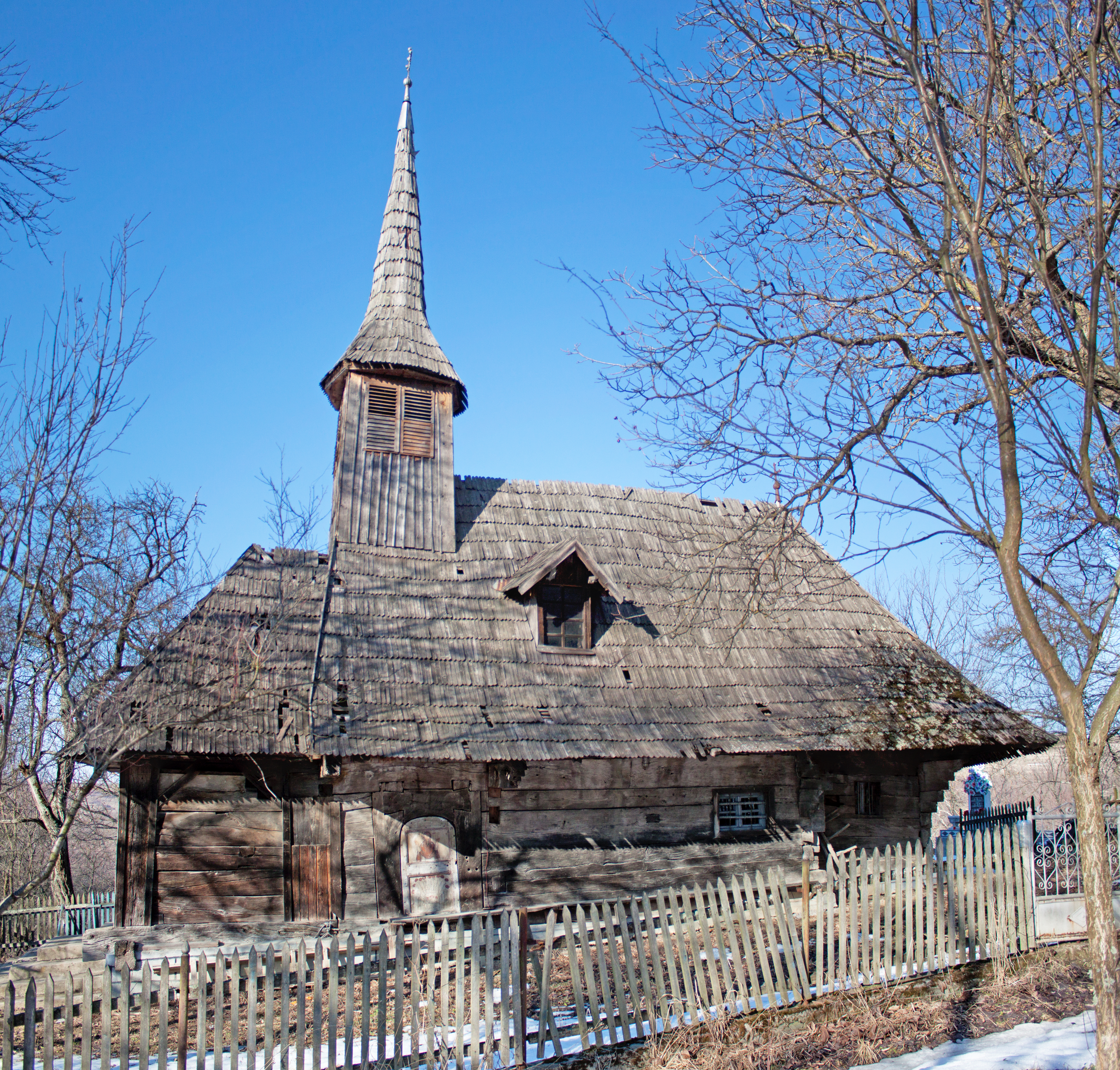
Wooden church in Bocșița

Orthodox church in Guruslău

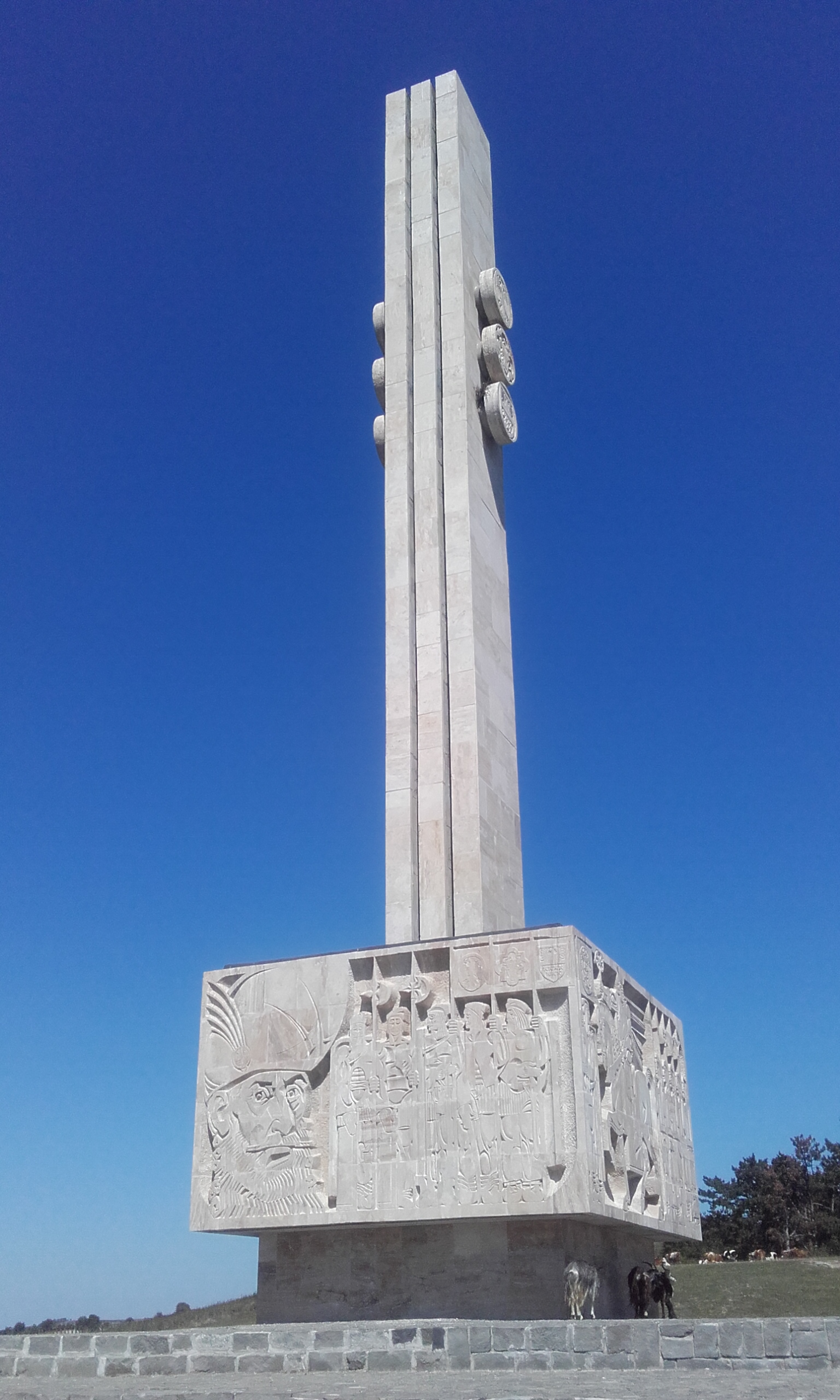
Monument to Michael the Brave in Guruslău

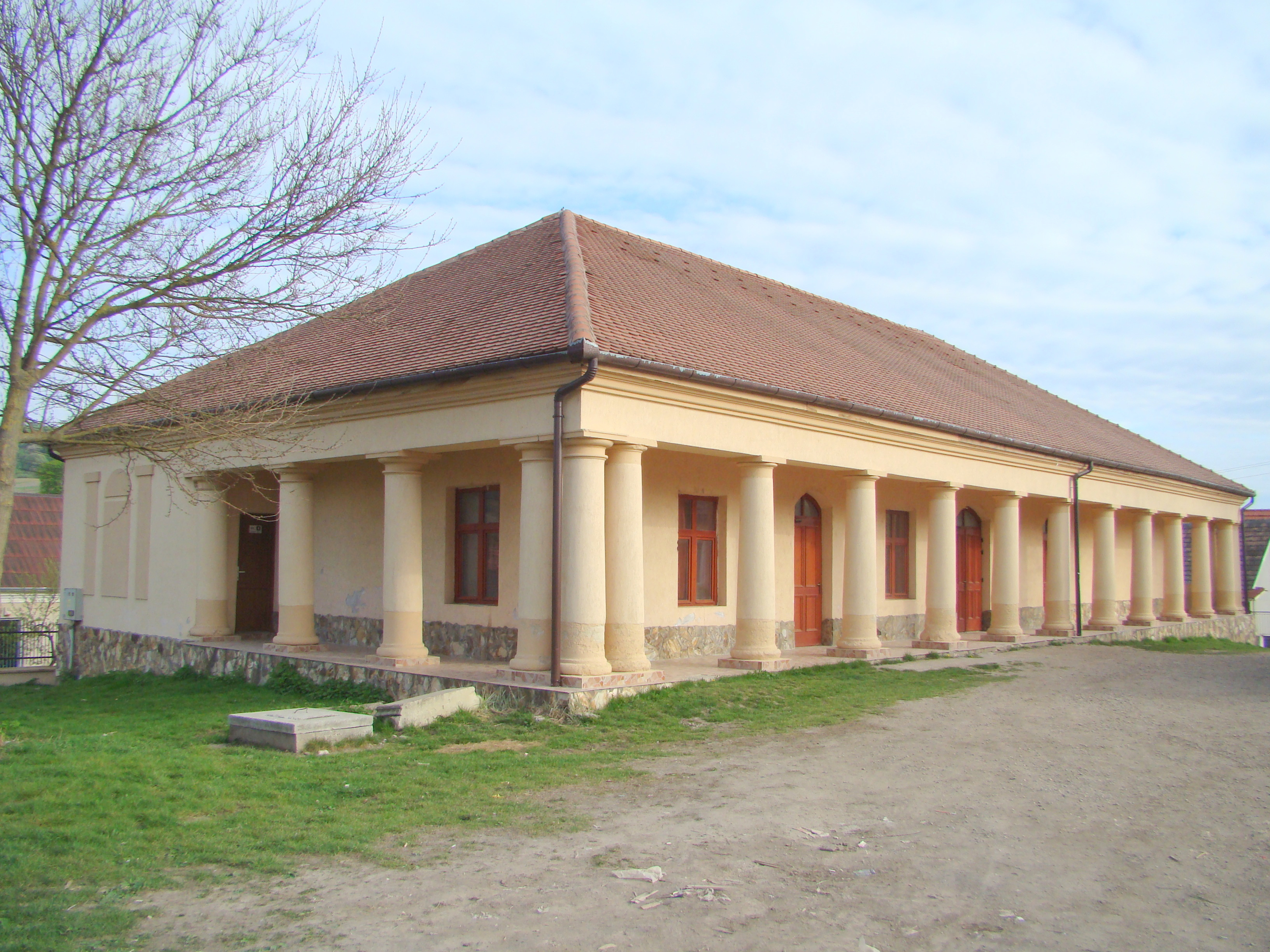
Sebeș mansion in Panic

== See also ==
- Battle of Guruslău
- Greek-Catholic Church in Badon
