= Aert Mijtens =

Flemish Renaissance painter (c. 1541–1602)

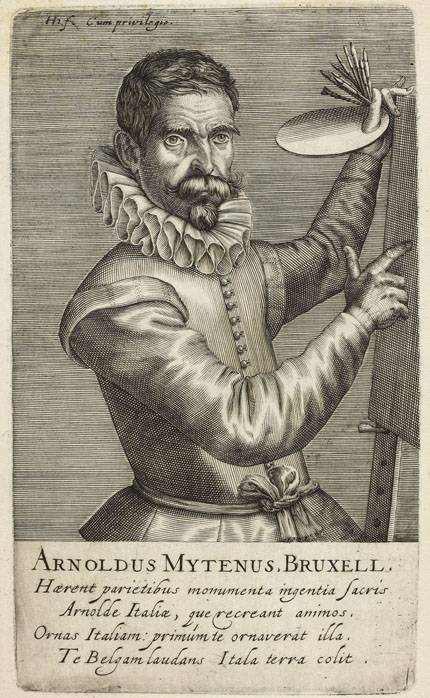
Portrait of Aert Mijtens, 1610 edition of Pictorum aliquot celebrium, by Hendrik Hondius

Aert Mijtens (Dutch pronunciation: [ˈaːrt ˈmɛitəns]; c. 1541 – 1601) was a Flemish Renaissance painter who worked for most of his career in Italy. Here he was known for his altarpieces.

== Family ==
Mitjens was born in Brussels. He was the first known member of a family of painters named Mijtens or Mytens. He was the uncle of Isaac Mijtens (ca. 1602–1666), a portrait painter in The Hague and Daniel Mijtens (ca. 1590-ca. 1647), a painter at the English court.

== Career ==
According to the early biographer Karel van Mander he travelled to Italy where he was called Rinaldo fiammingo and he became a friend of the Flemish painter Hans Speckaert.

Mijtens was active in Brussels, Rome, Naples , L'Aquila, and The Hague.

From c. 1573 to c. 1575 he lived on Via di Ripetta in Rome with his wife, two daughters and a son. From 1574 to 1592 he resided in Naples where he worked in the workshop of the Flemish painter Cornelis de Smet. De Smets workshop functioned as a base for foreigners from the Low Countries in Napels. He was adopted by Cornelis de Smet and worked as assistant or pupil and lived in his house. In Naples he was successful and worked for the court of the Viceroy.

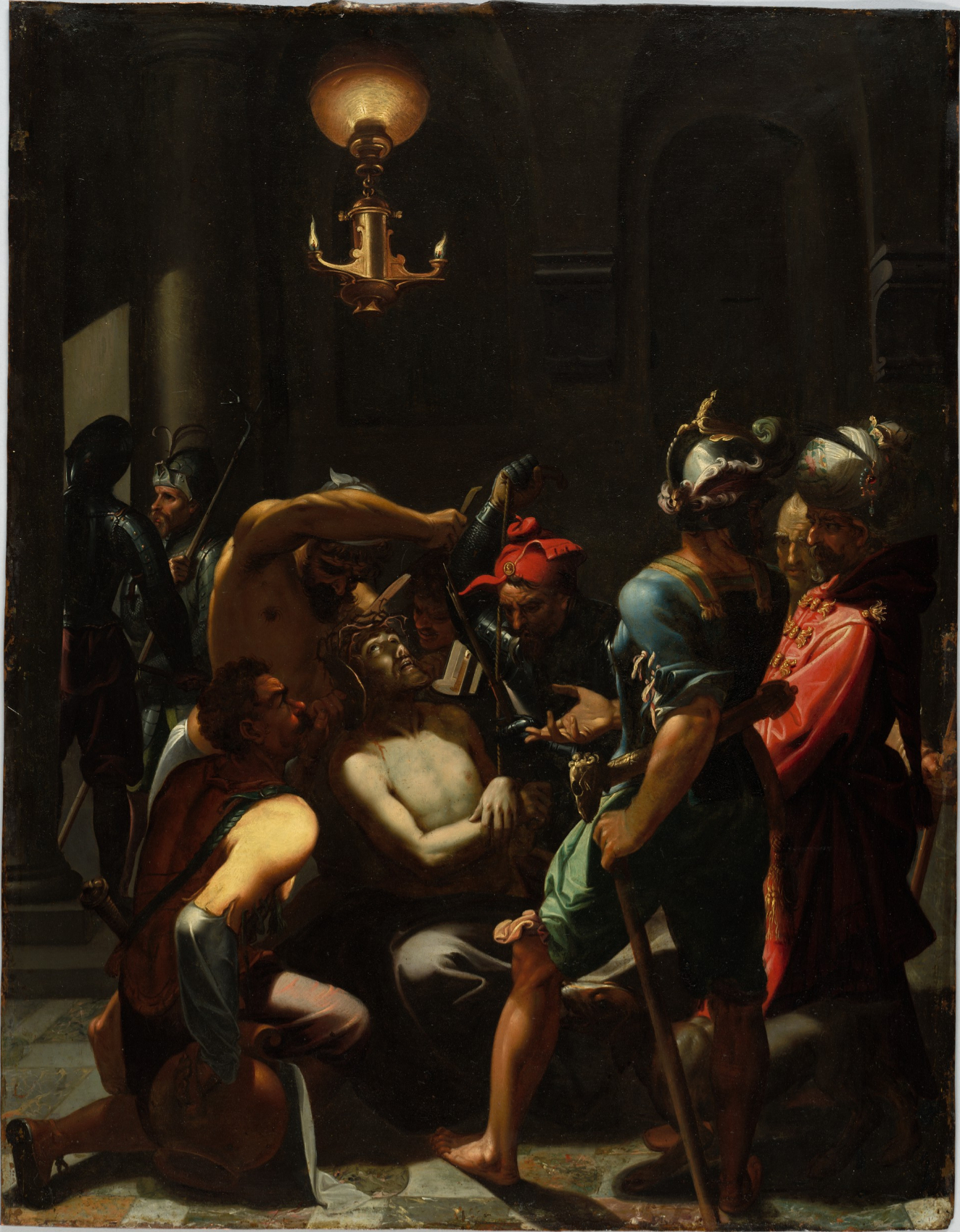
Christ Crowned with Thorns

After the death of Cornelis de Smet in October 1591 he travelled to Flanders to handle de Smet's affairs in Brabant and Flanders. Around this time he also spent time in The Hague. Upon his return to Naples in 1592 he became a board member of the local painters' guild in the years 1592 and 1593.

He left Napels forever between July 1598 and November 1599. He worked on a commission for the Franciscan Order of San Bernardino in L'Aquila, for whom he had also worked in 1594. From 1600 he was active in Rome. He was a teacher of Barend van Someren during his Rome residency. Van Someren married Mijtens' daughter Dionora in 1600 and returned with her to Flanders.

He lived in Rome with his children in the house of another Flemish painter Anthonis Santvoort in the Via di Ripetta. He worked in the workshop of Santvoort, who painted representations of Mary on copper. He lived there until his death in Rome where he was buried on 28 September 1601 in San Lorenzo in Lucina.

== Work ==
Aert Mijtens painted altarpieces, historical and mythological paintings, and portraits.
